= ATA (Israeli company) =

Israeli company

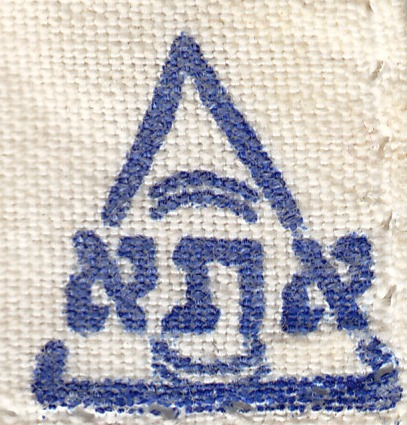
Logo of ATA Textile Company Ltd., as seen on a garment tag

ATA Textile Company Ltd. (Hebrew: "אתא חברה לטקסטיל בע"מ") was one of the first industrial enterprises founded in Israel, established in 1934. It was the first company in Israel to manufacture and design textiles locally. The textile factory continued to grow until the 1970s, and closed in 1985. ATA was re-established as a fashion brand in 2016 and is now based in Tel Aviv.

== History ==
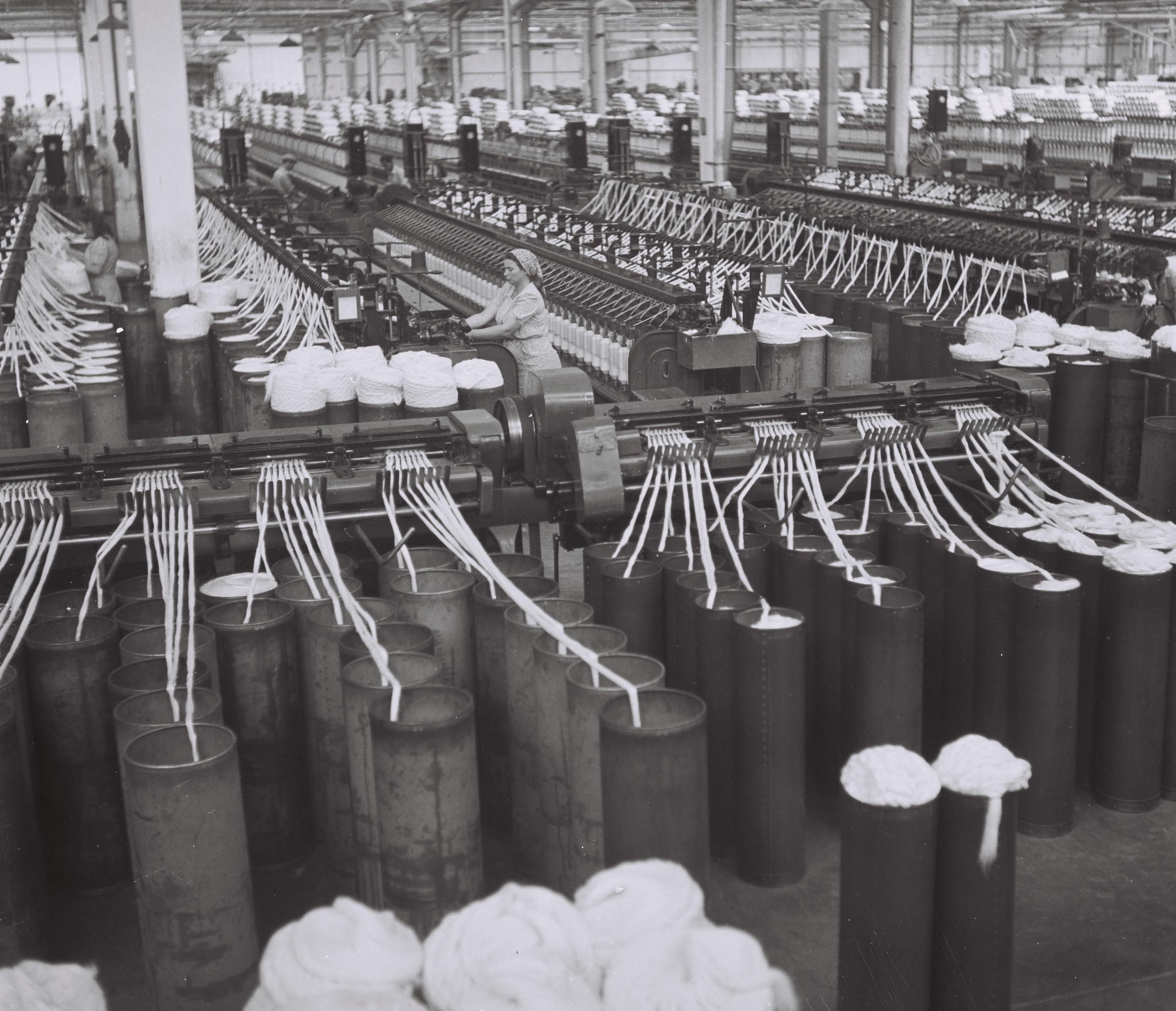
ATA textile factory, 1947

ATA was founded in 1934 by Erich Moller, the son of Jewish industrialists from Czechoslovakia. Moller purchased 110 acres of land in the small community of Kefar Ata (or "Kufritta", now known as Kiryat Ata), where he began the construction of a textile factory. Although named after the community in which it was founded, Israeli writer and Nobel Prize laureate Shmuel Yosef Agnon later declared that "ATA" stood for "Ariga Totzeret Artzenu" ("Textiles from our land").

In the summer of 1934, a water well was drilled on Moller's property, and a road was built directly linking the factory to nearby Haifa. Following the paving of the road, the area was electrified and telecom infrastructure was built. The architecture of the factory was based on plans from the Czechoslovak Škoda plant, who, due to financial agreements, became secondary contractors for construction of the factory. Machinery was also imported from Czechoslovakia, and pamphlets urging members of Zionist organizations in the country to study textile manufacturing were distributed in order to gather potential employees. The first workers who arrived from Czechoslovakia lived in communal workers' quarters on the site of the factory.

By 1936, the ATA factory had 115 employees, mostly from nearby kibbutzim, including Mishmar Yam (now Afek), Ein HaMifratz, and Kfar Masaryk.

In 1938, the factory had 205 employees, and ownership of the plant was passed onto Erich Moller's cousin, Hans Moller, who then made aliyah.

=== 1940s ===
The advent of World War II created a disconnect between Škoda in Czechoslovakia and ATA. Now operating independently, ATA became the largest supplier of tents and uniforms to the British Army in the Middle East. During the war, Mandatory Palestine served as a strategic centre for British military operations in the region, which guarded travel to India via the Suez Canal. As British supply transport was regularly subject to German submarine attacks, distribution and manufacturing was forced to centre around local factories in Palestine. Thus, much of what became Israeli industry after the establishment of the State of Israel grew during this period.

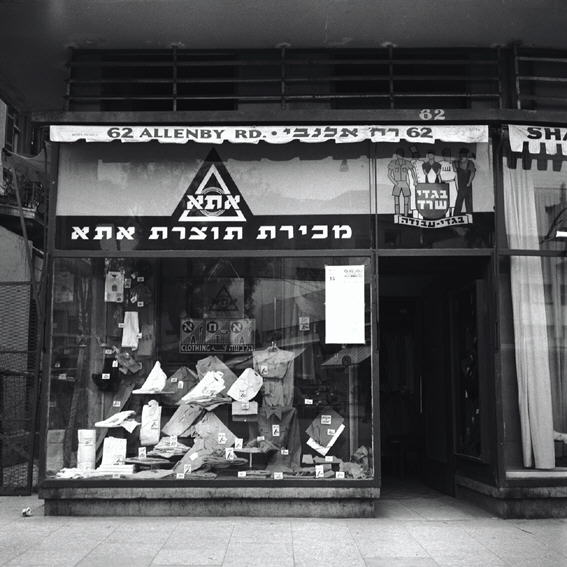
ATA store on Allenby Street, Tel-Aviv, 1947

Hans and Erich Moller established a subsidiary in order to market ATA goods during this period, called Theta ("תטא"). The company managed its own stores, as well as franchising them. Franchisees followed strict product display guidelines, thus these stores maintained a uniform appearance. Sales grew during this period and customers flocked to the stores. As ATA grew in popularity and in size, it began to establish benefits for its employees, as well as establishing its own discounted grocery stores for employees and their families, and operating as a pseudo-co-operative wherein workers were entitled to company shares. They also constructed more formal employee housing near the factories, and allowed ATA workers from nearby kibbutzim to move in. Managers and employees received similar wages. By 1946, ATA had 921 workers and was in the process of expanding the factory.

With the establishment of the State of Israel in 1948, as well as the consolidation of Jewish paramilitary organizations into the Israel Defense Forces ("IDF"), ATA became the chief manufacturer of IDF uniforms, socks, underwear, stretchers, tents, and machine gun straps.

In 1948, the factory numbered 1128 employees, and the Moller family sold a portion of its shares to Africa Israel Investments. Due to disagreements between Erich and Hans, Erich left the company and formed his own weaving workshop in Nahariya, as well as a textile factory in Kiryat Shmona.

=== 1950s ===
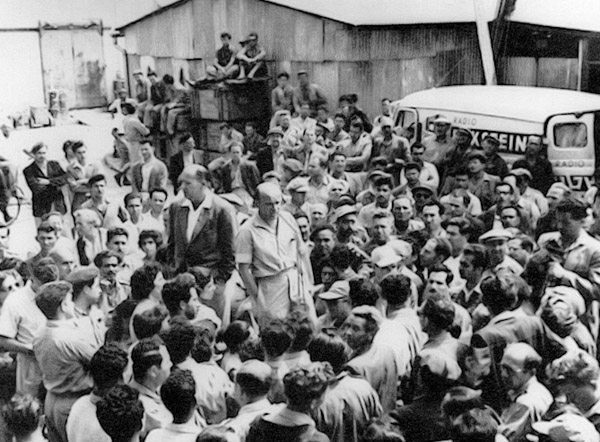
Workers meet with the secretary of Haifa's worker council at the ATA textile factory, 1956 or 1957

In the early 1950s, ATA became a supplier of rations through Israel's national austerity plan, providing clothing to civilians through rationing coupons that could be spent at ATA shops. Despite this economic downturn, the plant flourished, with products selling well in Israel and reaching an export income of around $1 million by 1954. Already producing cotton, yarn, and other woven fabrics, the plant began to produce corduroy by 1956.

Initially, ATA focused on producing khaki clothing, including tembel hats, trousers, and shirts that became synonymous with the company. Practical work clothing became the most acceptable style in Israel during this period, as other styles were associated with Jews of the diaspora. Dark blue work clothes were common, as well as white and light blue shirts. However, by the latter half of the 1950s, the standard of living in the country rose, and with it new fashion trends emerged; ATA, though still experiencing popularity, neglected to transition to higher fashion manufacturing. However, buying clothing from ATA stores was still considered a rite of passage for new immigrants, and was seen as a symbol of Israeli culture.

Israel began to receive payments from Germany in the mid-1950s. Experiencing high rates of unemployment in less-developed areas of the country, Minister of Trade and Industry Pinchas Sapir encouraged the establishment of new textile factories. Thus, ATA's hold on the textile industry in Israel began to be threatened. During this period, a new line of women's clothing was met with little response by consumers.

In April 1956, Hans Moller attempted to lay off a number of workers and limit wage raises. This caused a labour dispute, wherein factory workers demanded higher wages. The conflict continued to last until 1957, and the 1,680 ATA workers began a three-month long strike in May of that year. During this period, nearby Haifa was known as "red Haifa", as it was the traditional centre of the labour movement and left-wing political organizing in Israel; thus, a workers' victory seemed likely in the ATA strike, and striking workers were supported by the Haifa Labour Council. However, the Histadrut, Israel's national trade union centre, was led by Mapai members who were unable to reach a deal with the striking workers. Workers established a Mapam and Ahdut HaAvoda coalition in response to Mapai's hold on the Histadrut. Ultimately, Prime Minister David Ben-Gurion had to personally intervene to end the strike.

=== 1960s ===
In the 1960s, Israel sold ATA-made uniforms to West Germany.

In 1962, the ATA factory manager died, and Hans Moller had trouble finding a replacement. Thus, the factory was sold to a group of investors headed by Tibor Rosenbaum, who appointed Amos Ben-Gurion to manage the plant.

=== 1970s ===
in 1974 ATA was sold to the Eisenberg Group, an investment company based in Israel.

=== 1980s ===
In 1980, David Arbel replaced Amos Ben-Gurion as factory manager, and continued in his role as CEO until the company's closure. At the beginning of 1985, the Eisenberg Group attempted to sell the company to a group of real estate investors led by Michael Albin, leading to layoffs of employees and the closure of the factory. The company's workers received little to no support from the Histadrut, who cooperated with the closure of the factory, and workers went public with their grievances, coining the slogan, "Today it is ATA, tomorrow it is you!" ATA's assets were eventually purchased by Kitan, a manufacturer owned by the Clal Industries investment company, and rebranded as Golf & Co. Golf & Co. was later purchased by IDB Holding Corporation Ltd.

On the site of one of the former ATA plants, the Kryon company established a factory. On the original Kiryat Ata site, a residential neighbourhood was established. Prior to the construction of the neighbourhood, a preservation and heritage survey was undertaken and some of the original site's buildings were chosen for preservation. The original water tower also remains.

== Re-invention as a fashion brand ==
In 2016, following an exhibition of ATA history and clothing by the Eretz Israel Museum, businessman Shahar Segal and Yael Shenberger re-established ATA. The re-invented company is now based in Tel Aviv. The new ATA was established with the intention of reinstating the value of the clothes we wear. Aside from manufacturing old classics like the tembel hat and some work clothing, ATA now seeks to produce modernized versions of classic Israeli clothing (Segal once noted that the pockets of ATA-branded clothing were now able "to fit an iPhone").

ATA manufactures its clothes and considers them through a spectrum of time traveling; through what was and should be, through what is going on now, and through what is yet to come.

== Tembel hat ==
A tembel hat (Hebrew: kova tembel, כובע טמבל) is a hat which is an Israeli national symbol. The tembel hat was commonly worn by Jews in Israel from the beginning of the 20th century until the 1970s and was a symbol of hard-working, Zionist Israelis. In Israeli cartoons it is still used to symbolize the typical Israeli (e.g., the cartoon character Srulik). Tembel hats were most notably produced by ATA and are now being repreduced again.

In October 2017 the tembel hat was presented at the MOMA as part of the "Items: Is Fashion Modern?" exhibition, alongside some iconic fashion items such as the Levi's 501s, the Breton shirt, and the Little Black Dress, and as ancient and culturally charged as the sari, the pearl necklace, the kippah, and the keffiyeh.

== Collaborations ==
Pilpeled - May 2017. Capsule collection designed by the Israeli artist Pilpeled for ATA.

Working Class Hero - November 2017. Capsule collection with the Tel Avivian streetwear brand Holyland civilians.

Hapoel Tel Aviv - May 2018. Hapoel is a Tel Avivian sports club / soccer team but also means "The worker". ATA teamed up with the sport club with a special T-shirt for labor day.

1991 - December 2018. Capsule collection with the famous Israeli model, Anya Martirosov, telling her story of escaping from the USSR and moving to Israel.

Sara Kori - July 2019. Working overall for the Tel Aviv-based Tattoo artist Sara Kori (shin studio).

WHAT IF WOMEN RULED THE WORLD - May 2020. A couple of months after the covid pandemic started, ATA collaborated with Yael Bartana as part of her project "WHAT IF WOMEN RULED THE WORLD", as printed t-shirts asking / wondering how the world would be like if we had women ruling, especially in this critically times.

The New Denim Project - a collection made only with Guatemala-based TNDP fabrics, all up-cycled, hand woven, natural fabrics.

== See also ==
- Economy of Israel
