= The Peace Kids =

Mural by John Kiss in Tel Aviv, Israel

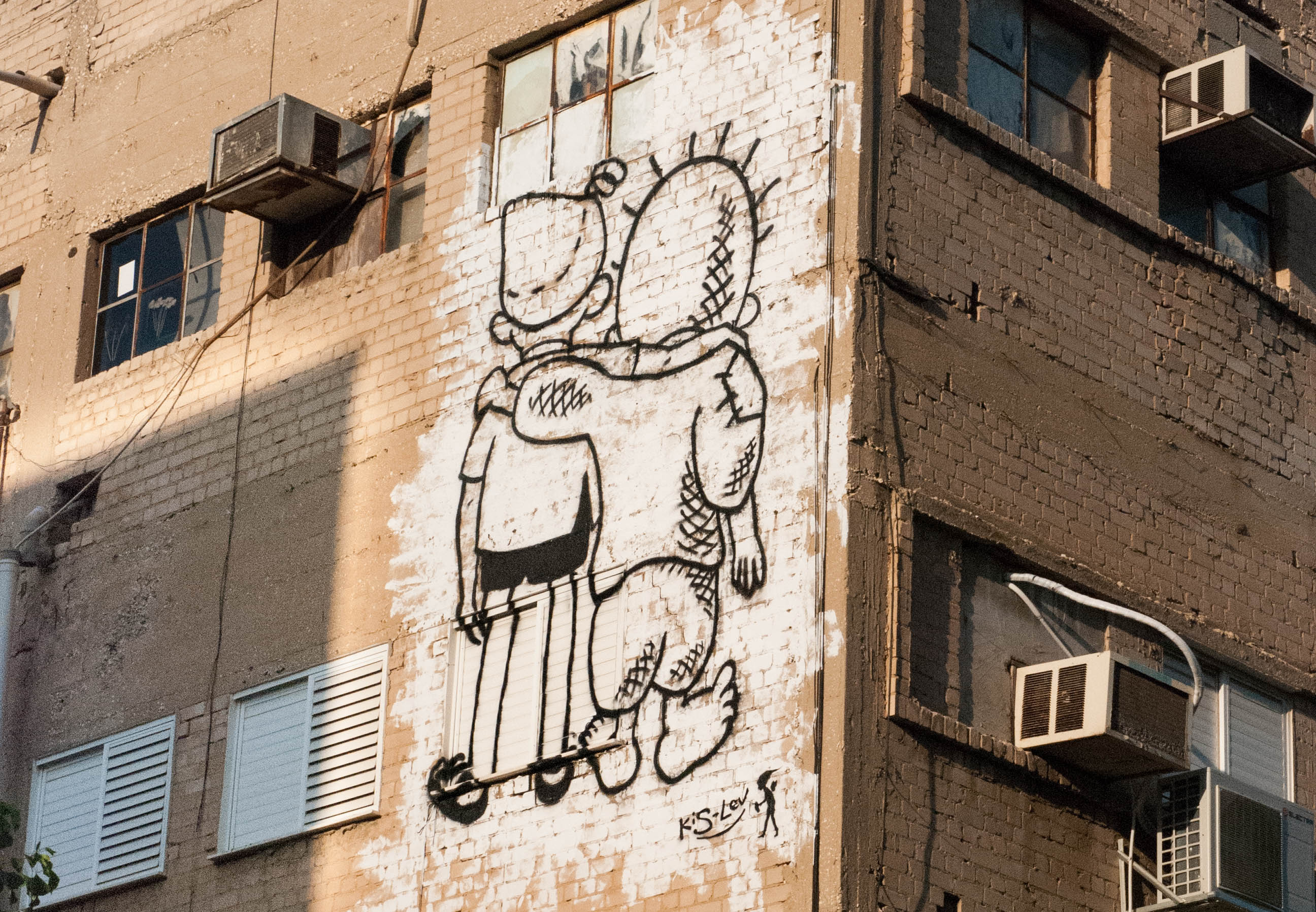
- The Tel Aviv work as seen from the street
- Artist: John Kiss
- Year: 2014
- Medium: Graffiti
- Movement: Street art
- Dimensions: 7 m × 3 m (280 in × 120 in)
- Location: Tel Aviv, Israel; 32.057271°N 34.768021°E

The Peace Kids
- Artist: John Kiss
- Year: 2014
- Medium: Graffiti
- Movement: Street art
- Dimensions: 7 m × 3 m (280 in × 120 in)
- Location: Bethlehem, Palestine; 31.7233°N 35.2059°E

The Peace Kids is a Tel Aviv street art mural depicting Srulik, a symbol of Israel, in embrace with Handala, a symbol of Palestine. It was created by Israeli artist John Kiss in dual locations: Bethlehem, Palestine (together with Palestinian artist Moodi Abdallah) and Tel Aviv, Israel.

== History ==
The work was created by John Kiss, an Israeli street artist and peace activist. Known previously as Jonathan Kis-Lev, his graffiti work, political installations, community-based projects and public artworks have granted him the title the "Israeli Banksy".

Kiss became involved in peace activities from a young age. Later, traumatized by his three years in Israel's mandatory military service, Kiss began spraying pro-peace and anti-war catchphrases. These catchphrases were often sprayed in Hebrew and Arabic. However, Kiss felt construed and limited by mere words, and wished to express his yearning for peace in a non-verbal and visual way.

Kiss thought extensively and sketched hundreds of images trying to depict peace in the Middle East and an end to the Arab–Israeli conflict. His sketches included as various elements as the peace symbol, dove and olive branch, broken rifles, a wolf living with a lamb, visual rearrangements of the word "peace" in Arabic ("salaam") and in Hebrew ("shalom"), and many other sketches. Disappointed, he felt that "all attempts were lame."

Kiss wished to create an iconic image, one that could "be reproduced on shirts and stickers, and could be immediately identified as a peace sign specifically to Palestinians and Israelis." Kiss had in mind the location: the West Bank barrier, and more specifically, the wall in Bethlehem, a wall whose construction Kiss had opposed, and a wall on which such artists as Banksy left their mark.

In a visit to the Bethlehem area, Kiss saw caricatures of Handala, a well-known Palestinian caricature. He had seen these caricatures before, but he did not know enough about the caricature or its meaning. Asking his Palestinian friends, Kiss found that Handala was the most famous caricature by Palestinian cartoonist Naji al-Ali. Al-Ali first depicted Handala as a ten-year-old boy. The figure turned his back to the viewer and clasped his hands behind his back. Al-Ali explained that the ten-year-old represented his age when forced to leave Palestine and would not grow up until he could return to his homeland. Handala wears ragged clothes and is barefoot, symbolizing his allegiance to the poor. Al-Ali vowed that Handala would "reveal his face to the readers again only when Palestinian refugees return to their homeland".

Kiss, realizing the caricature's importance as a national symbol and personification of the Palestinian people, wished to examine the possibility of incorporating it into his art. It was then that he wondered whether Israel had a character that personified the Israeli people. He immediately thought of Srulik.

Srulik is a cartoon character symbolizing Israel. The character was created in 1956 by the Israeli cartoonist Dosh. Srulik is generally depicted as a young man "Zionist, pioneer, farmer" wearing an Israeli hat, Biblical sandals, and dark khaki shorts. Srulik was described as an icon of Israel in the same way that Marianne and Uncle Sam were respectively icons of France and the United States.

Kiss thought that juxtaposing the two characters together could be a "powerful visual message to represent the hope for peace in the Middle East." Kiss therefore began sketching the two characters together. For Handala to be recognizable, he had to be portrayed with his back to the viewer. Kiss wanted Srulik to be depicted next to Handala, in the same manner, and therefore had to place Srulik with his back to the viewer as well.

In all of the caricatures of Srulik, he was never depicted from the back, and Kiss had to take artistic liberty in envisioning how the late artist Dosh would have sketched his iconic character from the back. Kiss drew the typical Israeli "Tembel" hat and the curl and ears as they would appear from the back, as well as the white shirt and dark pants, along with the biblical sandals. In this version, both caricatures were turning their backs to the viewer, but their faces "to the future."

In 2014 Kiss joined with Palestinian artist Moodi Abdallah, and together they met in Bethlehem, creating the large mural on the Bethlehem wall, sized 275 inches (700 cm) high by 118 inches (300 cm) wide. Entering the Palestinian Authority-controlled Bethlehem is illegal for Israeli citizens, but Kiss stated that "some laws need breaking, especially if through the violation there is a possibility of furthering peace." Muki Jankelowitz, director of Machon, stated about the work that it "engages in discussion." He added, "If good art is meant to make people stop and think, then Kiss has achieved that."

Kiss wished to paint the mural both in the Palestinian territories as well as within Israel, for the message of peace needed to be directed at both sides of the conflict. He chose Tel Aviv as the location of the Israeli mural, on a street named Frenkel.

== Reception ==
Art journalist Zipa Kampinski of Israel's largest newspaper, Yedioth Ahronoth, dedicated an entire article to the new Kiss mural on Frenkel street, titled "Sparkle on Frenkel Street" in which she wrote:

At first glance it seems like an innocent, almost childish painting. But first glances may be deceiving. It turns out John Kiss is not a fool. He only appears to be a goody two shoes. He dreamed of doing this painting for many years. [...] The characters are the main thing. They are not just two children walking into eternity embraced; these are two charged political symbols. The Israeli one: Srulik of the famous cartoonist and illustrator Dosh, a character born as early as 1956. And the other a Palestinian: Handala, the well-known refugee figure of cartoonist Naji al-Ali, first published in 1969. And now, in this new work, Srulik and Handala are embracing, walking together on such a high wall that it would be difficult to erase the possibility they represent. What gift could have made our streets happier than this one?

The work was received with mixed criticism. It was called "naïve" and "delusional" by both Israelis and Palestinians. Israeli illustrator and Bezalel Arts Academy professor Michel Kichka wrote:

I, too, have seen this large-scale graffiti [...] It is doubtful whether such a painting could have been created in the lives of Al-Ali and Dosh. Dosh was a nationalist right-wing, Ali was opposed to Israel's very existence. Nevertheless, this naïve painting has a spirit of reconciliation and brotherhood that warms the heart.

The work was considered "an optimistic piece" according to Forward Magazine. As such, it suited Kiss's wish to bring "happiness" to the viewers of his work. Some commented that "this hug shows John Kiss's commitment to peace." Others saw it as a "yearning of Kiss for peace, essentially asking, 'why can't we all just get along.'"

Art scholar Stav Shacham noted that "putting these two characters together, hugging, walking together on a path that we cannot see just yet, but there is a lot of optimism here." She called the work "one of the most beautiful works of art we have in Florentin."

The artwork highlighted the development of the artist's oeuvre beyond merely entertaining and decorative street art, featuring his criticism at the state of the stagnant peace process between the Israelis and the Palestinians. The work subsequently became a symbol for peace, repainted by other artists, reproduced on shirts, included in artistic films, and appearing on posters and peace conferences invitations.

In 2019 Kiss was contacted by the magazine Peace Science Digest following the magazine's interest in The Peace Kids Mural. The international magazine, a project of the War Prevention Initiative, aims at closing the gap between the insights of peace science and the working knowledge that policy makers and practitioners use in their day-to-day operations. Wishing to give the magazine a fresh edge, magazine editors asked for permission to use the Peace Kids Mural as the front cover for their June 2019 issue. Kiss enthusiastically approved, stating that he hoped for the visual message to be used freely with anything associated with peace, reconciliation, and conflict resolution. The work was featured on the front cover of the magazine, crediting the artist for creating a "political" work portraying "Israeli Srulik and Palestinian Handala embracing each other."

In October 2019 the work was featured in the British Reform Magazine. The magazine noted:

The mural triggered enormous controversy. The genius of Kiss and his crew was to bring together these two iconic figures, who already had a life and significance of their own. [...] Kiss' graffito joins them in friendship. Critics on both sides of the divide have said the image is naïve, but to many others, it is an image of hope and aspiration.

== See also ==
- Culture of Israel
- Israeli–Palestinian peace process
- Graffiti
- Negation of the Diaspora
- Sabra
