= Culture of Tel Aviv =

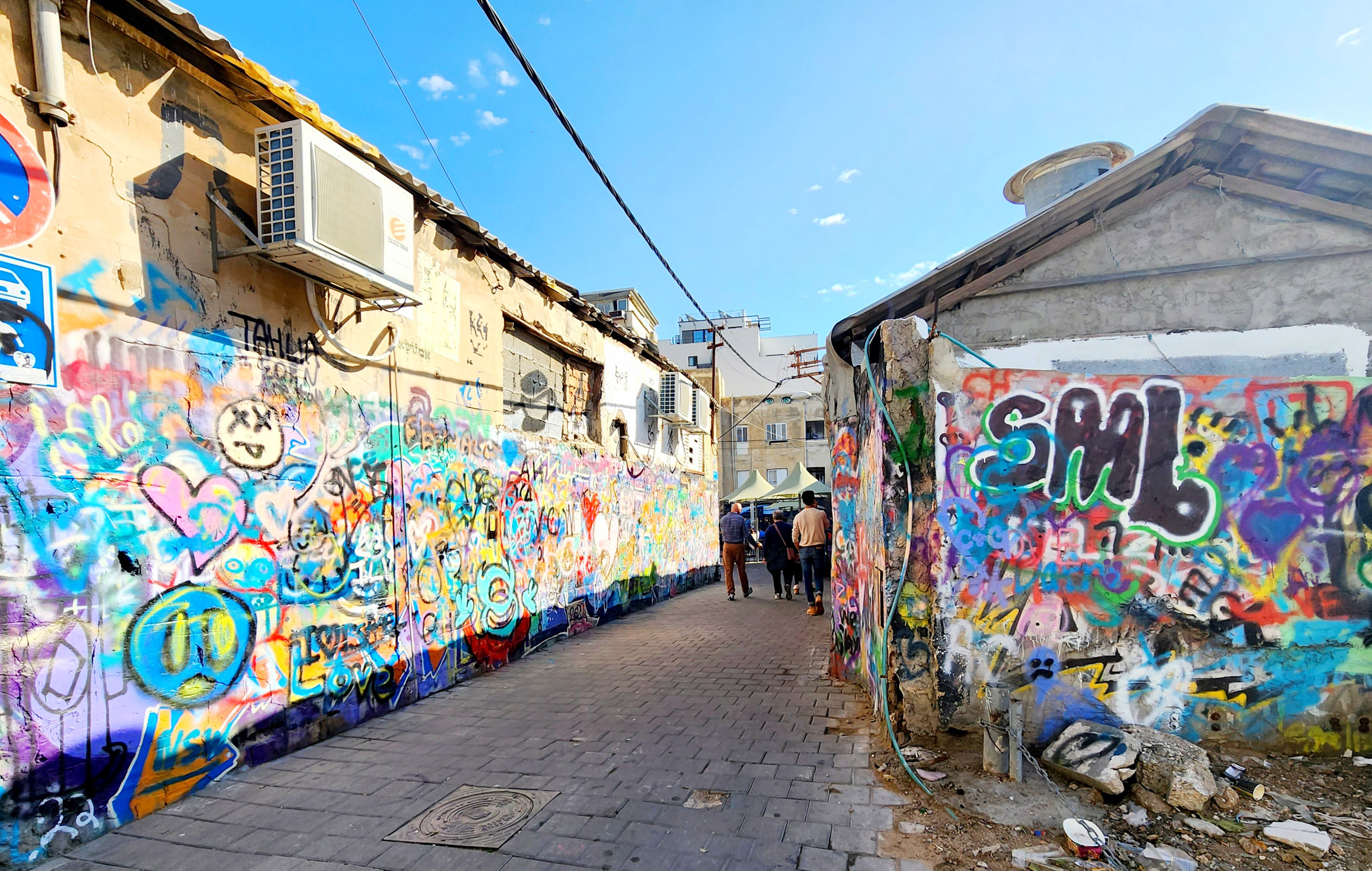
A street in Florentin, Tel Aviv

Tel Aviv-Yafo (Hebrew: תֵּל אָבִיב-יָפוֹ; Arabic: تَلّ أَبِيب – يَافَا) or Tel Aviv, is the most populous city in the Gush Dan metropolitan area of Israel. The city of Tel Aviv is the cultural and economic core of the State of Israel. The city has a large number of cultural and entertainment institutions and is home to the largest number of Israeli intellectuals. the people who live on the city are usually called "Tel Avivim" in Hebrew (תל אביבים) or "Tel Avivians" in English.

Founded in 1909, Tel Aviv is a major metropolitan center known for its arts and cultural institutions. The city has a diverse population, including secular Jews and Arab citizens of Israel, and has been associated with left-wing political activity in Israel.

== Arts ==
Tel Aviv is home to a thriving arts scene, with numerous galleries, museums, and theaters. The Tel Aviv Museum of Art is one of the leading art institutions in Israel, showcasing both Israeli and international artists. The Eretz Israel Museum offers insights into the country's archaeology, folklore, and culture.

=== Street art ===
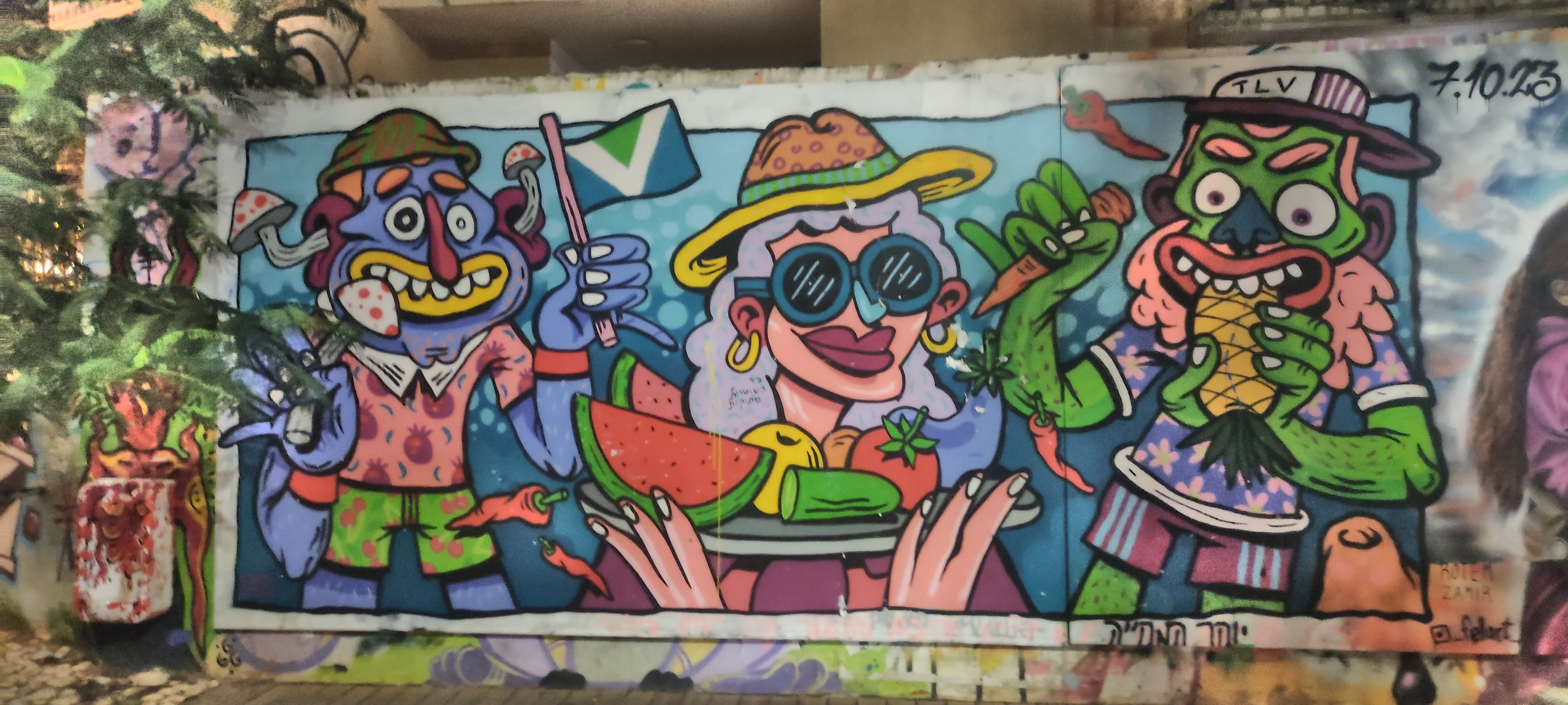
"go vegan!", artwork by Dioz in Haim Ben Atar garden, Florentin, Tel Aviv, Israel

Street art and graffiti in Tel Aviv are prominent, particularly in neighborhoods like Florentin and the Old Tel Aviv central bus station. While some artists directly address political issues, others just paint random art.

==== Florentin ====
Tel Aviv's Florentin neighborhood is decorated in unique graffiti and arts, and operators regularly offer guided street art tours for foreigners and Israelis alike. Florentin is home to many artists such as Dioz, Dede, Tag and more.

The graffiti in Florentin plays a crucial role in shaping Tel Aviv's urban culture, fostering the community's identity.

==== 27 Club graffiti ====
The 27 Club graffiti is a mural in Tel Aviv, Israel, painted by John Kiss with the assistance of Itai Froumin and Roman Kozhokin. The work depicts, from left to right, Brian Jones, Jimi Hendrix, Janis Joplin, Jim Morrison, Jean-Michel Basquiat, Kurt Cobain, Amy Winehouse, and an unknown figure believed to depict Kiss.

Over the years since its creation in 2014, the work has become known as one of Israel's must-see street artworks, and according to From the Grapevine Magazine "the most popular in Florentin." Some locals define it as "sensational".

== Politics ==
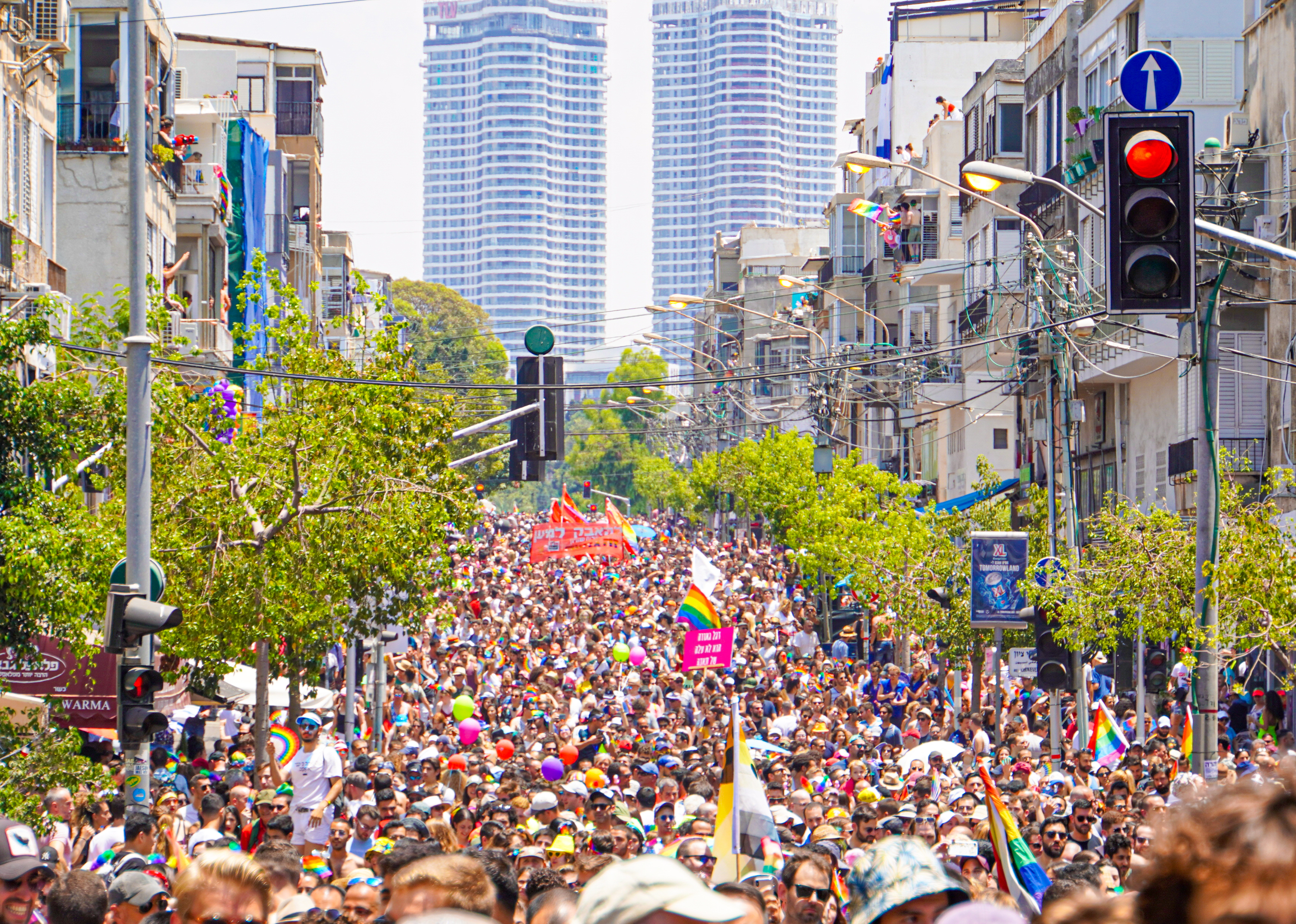
Tel Aviv Pride, 2019

=== LGBT culture ===
Tel Aviv was referred to by the Calgary Herald as one of the most gay-friendly cities in the world, famous for its annual pride parade and gay beaches, earning it the nickname "the gay capital of the Middle East" by Time Out magazine.

The city's LGBTQ+ community is supported by numerous bars, clubs, and organizations, and it plays a significant role in the city's cultural and social life.

==== Tel Aviv Pride ====
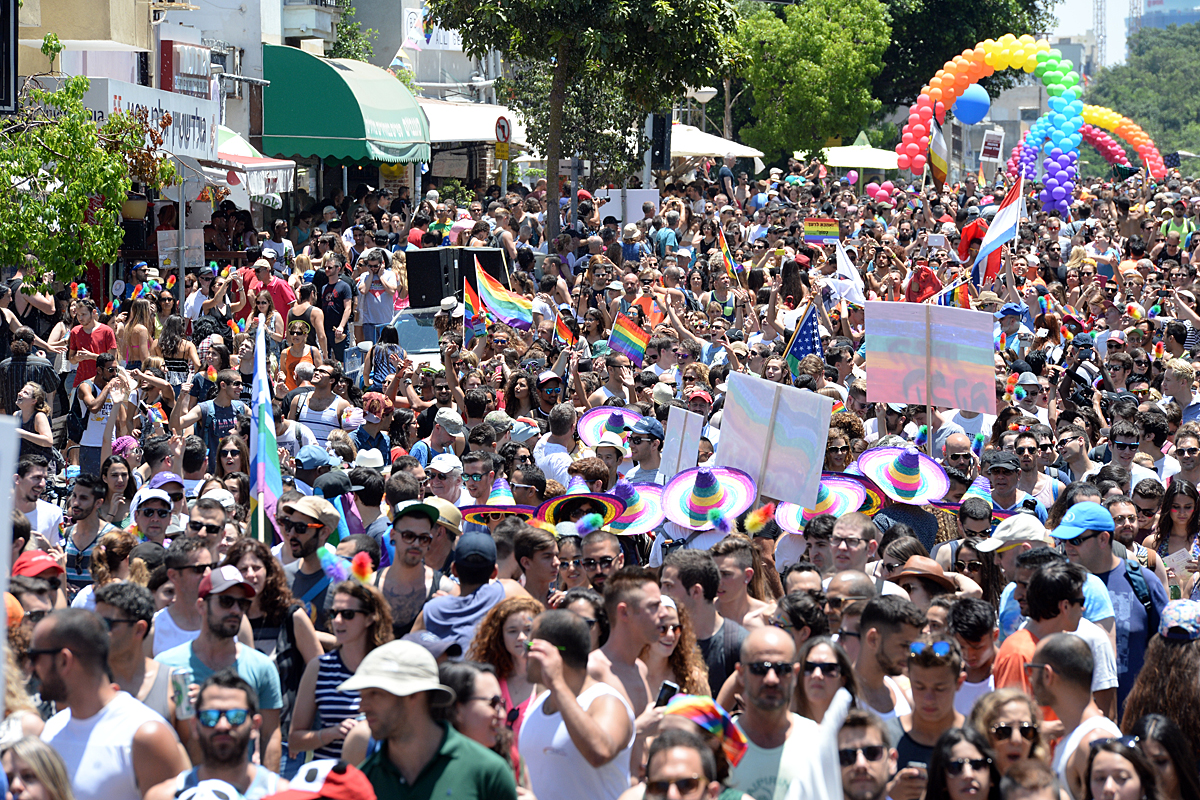
Tel Aviv Pride, 2015

Tel Aviv Pride (Hebrew: מצעד הגאווה בתל אביב, Arabic: فخر تل أبيب) is a week-long series of events in Tel Aviv which takes place on the second week of June, as part of the international observance of Gay Pride Month. The key event, taking place on Friday, is the Pride Parade itself which attracts over 250,000 attendees. As of June 2019, it is the largest LGBT Parade in Asia.

This annual Pride Parade attracts hundreds of thousands of participants and visitors from around the globe.

==== TLVFest ====
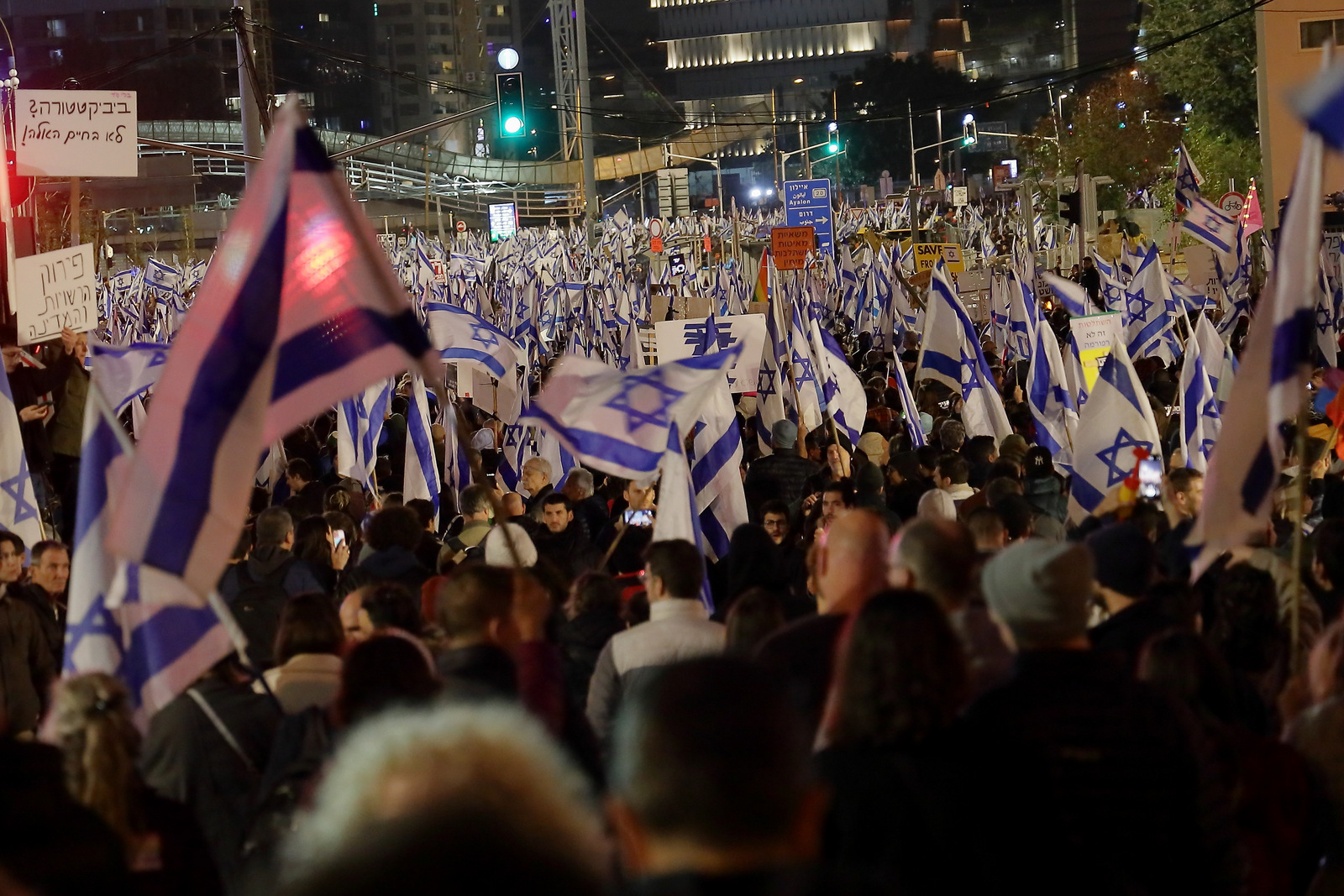
2023 Israeli judicial reform protests taking place in Tel Aviv, the biggest protests in the city history

TLVFest, officially the Tel Aviv International LGBTQ+ Film Festival (Hebrew: הפסטיבל הבינלאומי לקולנוע גאה), is an annual film festival held in Tel Aviv, Israel. The festival is focused on LGBTQ-themed film from around the world.

The festival runs around the same time as, sometimes concurrently, with Tel Aviv Pride.

==== Lethal Lesbian ====
Lethal Lesbian (Hebrew: לסבית קטלנית) is Israel's only lesbian film festival. The festival has been held annually since 2008, and screens independent short, documentary and feature films from Israel and abroad.

=== Vegan culture ===
In June of 2022, the city helped to host Vegan Fest, which was described by news outlets to be the biggest vegan food festival in the world. The event took place over three days in Sarona Park and featured over 100 different food stalls.

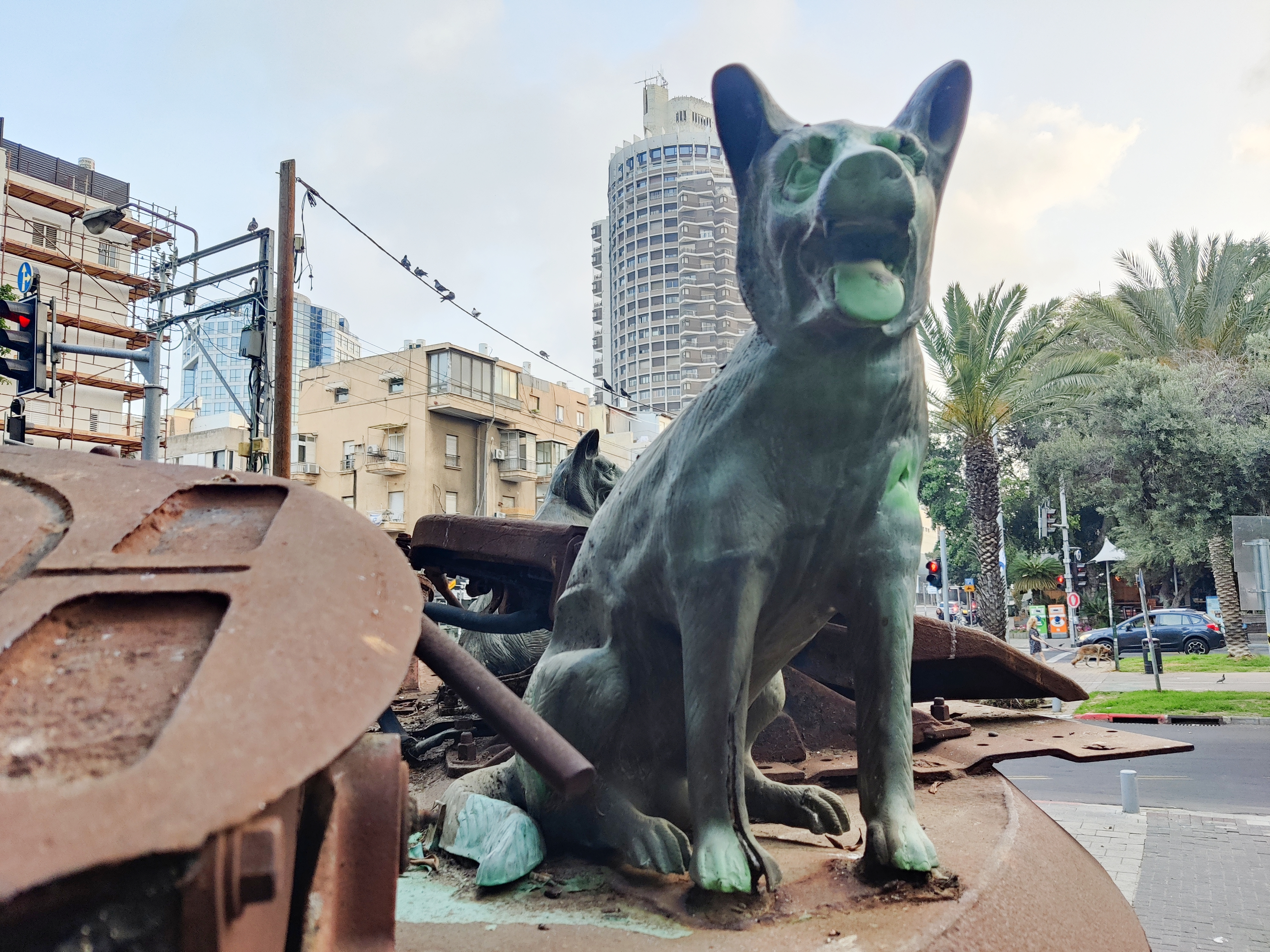
"Well and Four Dogs", dog statue built by Ya'acov Dorchin

== Dog-Friendly ==
Tel Aviv is ranked at 3rd place as the most dog-friendly city in the world. Tel Aviv has 182.10 dogs per 1,000 people, putting it in third place in that category behind Seattle and Miami.

There are also plenty of dog-friendly beaches in Tel Aviv such as Hilton Beach, a gay beach popular among dog owners. They are allowed in most cafes, stores and even high-end restaurants, as well as on city buses and trains and in taxi vans. Tel Aviv boasts 70 dog parks and four dog beaches according to 1 September 2016.

== Nightlife ==
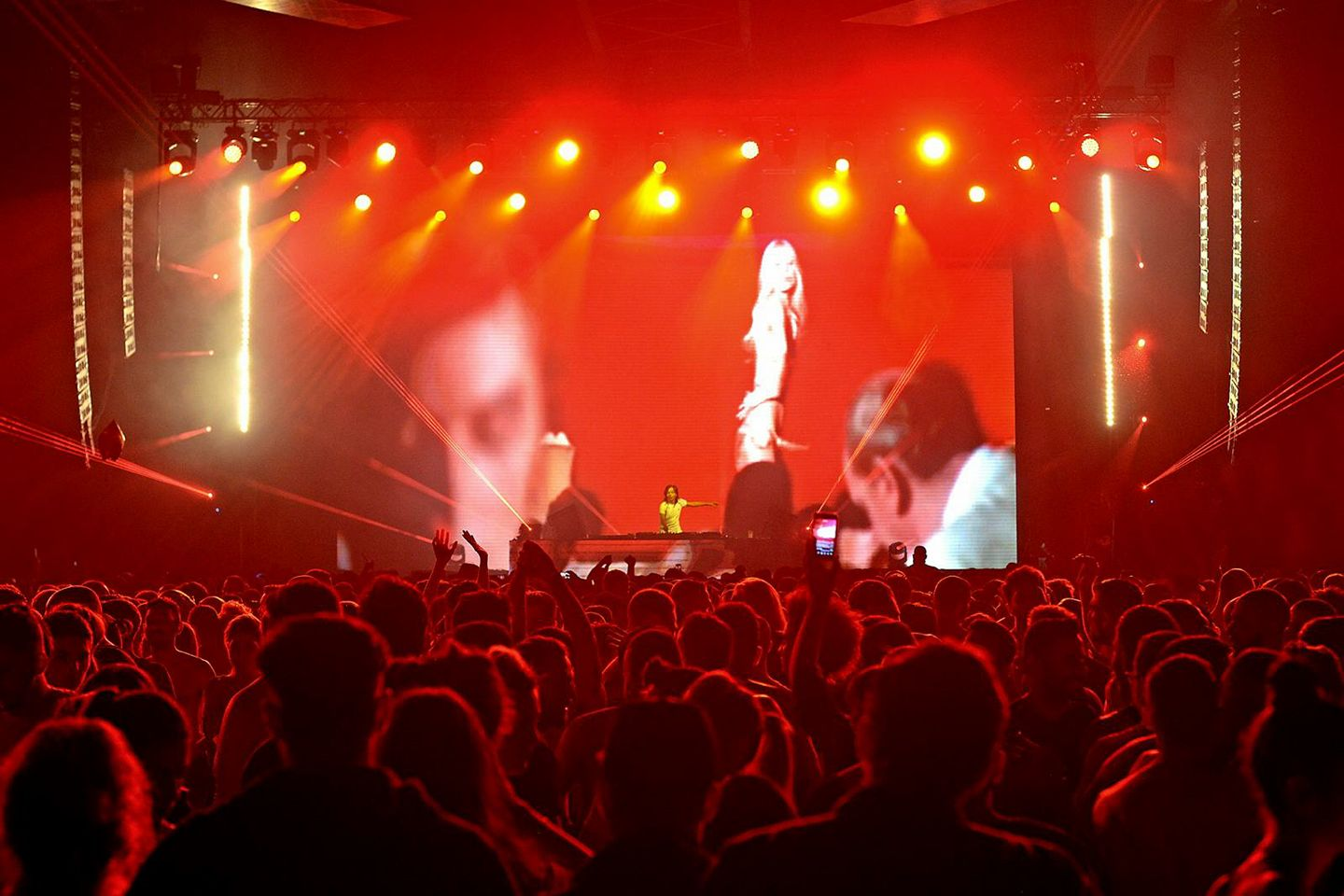
Haoman 17 in Tel Aviv has been rated one of the top night clubs in the world

By 1989, Tel Aviv had acquired the nickname "Nonstop City", as a reflection of the growing recognition of its nightlife and 24/7 culture, and "Nonstop City" had to some extent replaced the former moniker of "First Hebrew City". Tel Aviv nightlife is characterized by a variety of venues, including bars, clubs, live music spots, and beachside hangouts.

Bars generally get busy only at midnight, with some clubs filling up only at 2am.

== See also ==
- Art in Tel Aviv
- Culture of Israel
