= Kariel Gardosh =

Israeli caricaturist and illustrator, pen name Dosh

Kariel Gardosh (Hebrew: קריאל גרדוש; April 15, 1921 – February 28, 2000) was an Israeli cartoonist and illustrator known by his pen name Dosh (Hebrew: דוש). He worked as a political cartoonist for the Israeli daily newspaper Ma'ariv and for the Jerusalem Post. Gardosh is the creator of the character Srulik which became a symbol for sabras and the State of Israel, similar to Uncle Sam in the United States.

== Biography ==
Karl Goldberger (Hungarian: Gárdos Károly) (later Kariel Gardosh) was born in Budapest in 1921 to an assimilated Jewish family. With the outbreak of World War II he and his family were arrested by the Nazis. Gardosh was sent to mine copper as forced labor, and his parents and most of his family were killed in the Auschwitz concentration camp. In early 1946 he left Hungary and moved to France. He studied comparative literature at the Sorbonne University.

In 1948, Goldberger immigrated to Israel and changed his name to Kariel. He later joined Lehi and participated in several operations. After the assassination of Folke Bernadotte, Goldberger was arrested for his membership in Lehi. He was released after the organization was amnestied in 1949. In 1953 he joined the staff of the Maariv newspaper where he published a daily political cartoon for many years. Gradually he began to engage in writing articles, stories and skits for the newspaper as well.

Gardosh and three of his colleagues at Maariv - Yosef Lapid, Ephraim Kishon and Yaakov Farkash (Ze'ev), were affectionately called "the Hungarian mob."

In 1981–1983 Gardosh worked at as a cultural attaché at the Israeli embassy in London.

He had two children with his first wife, Shoshana Roman, and lived with his partner Tova Pardo until his death of heart failure on 28 February 2000, at the age of 78.

== Awards and commemoration ==
Gardosh won the Herzl Prize, the Nordau Prize, the Jabotinsky Award and the Sokolow Prize in recognition of his work.
