= Tembel hat =

Hat associated with Israel

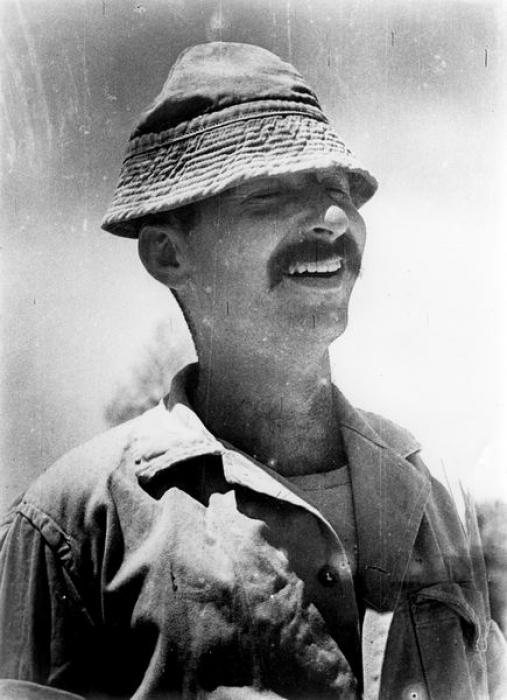
Famous Israeli general and archaeologist Yigal Yadin wearing a tembel hat

A tembel hat (Hebrew: כובע טמבל, kova tembel) is a type of bucket hat that became an Israeli national symbol. The tembel hat was worn by Jews in Israel from the beginning of the 20th century until the 1970s. It was associated with hard-working Zionist Israelis. It especially became associated with kibbutzim, tzabarim, and Israeli youth movements. In Israeli cartoons it is still used to symbolize the typical Israeli (e.g., the cartoon character Srulik). Tembel hats were most notably produced by the ATA textile company.

== Construction ==
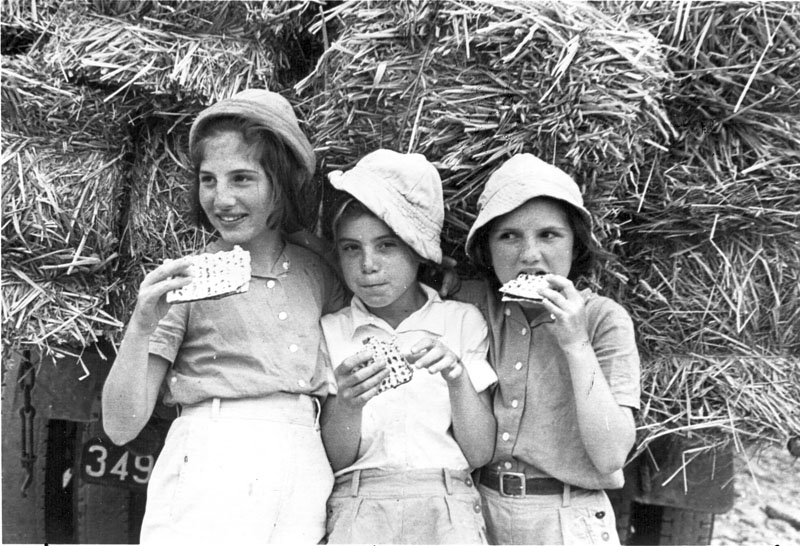
Girls wearing tembel hats and eating matzos

Using a template made by deconstructing a United States Navy sailor's cap, the tembel hat is a direct copy, sewn from five pieces of fabric. The only difference is that the tembel is intended to be worn with the brim folded down, rather than upright as it was designed to be worn by US sailors. Four of the pieces are in the shape of a circular sector and are sewn so that the tops of the four pieces touch each other and each shank of each sector is sewn to the shank of another sector. In this way, the sectors form a bowl-like structure. The fifth piece of fabric is in the shape of a ring. One end of the ring is sewn to the bases of the sectors that form the bowl structure so that the ring deepens the bowl structure.

A tembel hat has no visor and no brim. When the hat is worn, the tops of the sectors rest on the top of the head and the ring of fabric surrounds the head and rests on the forehead, ears, and nape. Its advantage is that it can be easily folded and put into a pocket, making it suitable for workers who work long hours in the sun. The tembel hat is cheap because it is easy to sew from a small amount of fabric scraps.

== Etymology ==
In Hebrew slang, tembel means silly, stupid, or fool. It is not known whether the slang term was named after the hat or the hat after the slang term. There is a theory that the tembel hat was originally the heavy-duty hat of the Templers, a Christian movement that was active in Israel in the late 19th and early 20th centuries. By this theory, the hat's first name was "Templer's hat", later changed to "tembel hat" by Arabs who could not pronounce the P and the correct vowels. However, it is more likely that the name "tembel hat" derives from the Turkish word tembel, which means lazy. The tembel's shape is the same as the pileus, the hat adopted by freed slaves in Greek and Roman antiquity and adopted as a symbol of freedom at the time of the French Revolution. The ancient pileus survived in Albania in the early 20th century and may have influenced the leaders of the Second Aliyah, who adopted the hat.

== See also ==
- List of hat styles
- Biblical sandals
- Bucket hat
- Israeli fashion
- Culture of Israel
- Legionnaire hat
