= 27 Club graffiti in Tel Aviv =

Mural by John Kiss in Tel Aviv, Israel

27 Club Graffiti
- Artist: John Kiss
- Year: 2014
- Medium: Graffiti
- Movement: Street art
- Dimensions: 300 cm × 1000 cm (120 in × 390 in)
- Location: Haim Ben Atar St 3, Tel Aviv, Israel; 32.0559°N 34.7683°E

The 27 Club graffiti is a Tel Aviv street art mural in the Florentin neighborhood of Tel Aviv, Israel created by the Israeli artist John Kiss with the assistance of Itai Froumin and Roman Kozhokin. The artwork was created in 2014.

The work depicts, from left to right, Brian Jones, Jimi Hendrix, Janis Joplin, Jim Morrison, Jean-Michel Basquiat, Kurt Cobain, Amy Winehouse, and an unknown figure believed to depict Kiss.

== Background ==
The artwork depicts seven artists from the "27 Club," a list of popular musicians or artists who died at the age of 27.

The work was created by John Kiss, an Israeli street artist and peace activist previously known as Jonathan Kis-Lev.

== Development ==
Kiss chose the holiday of Rosh Hashana as the time to execute the work, likely to ensure that the police would be unable to reach the public art department at Tel Aviv city hall. To convince police that the work was indeed commissioned, she and her team wore yellow vests and yellow helmets like city hall workers.

Art journalist Zipa Kampinski of Israel's largest newspaper, Yedioth Ahronoth, was privy to the story and covered the mural's secretive creation process.

Kiss was assisted by fellow artists Itai Froumin and Roman Kozhokin in executing the piece. The work took 24 hours for the team to complete. The large painting attracted an enthusiastic audience to the spot where the graffiti was created.

Kiss painted the portraits of the famous artists in colors, but left her own portrait at the far right in gray.

The result, 3 m (9.8 ft) high by 7 m (23 ft) wide, depicted seven artists from the "27 Club". Kiss did not supply the press with details about her own figure, which was left for many to guess, believing the figure "to be the artist".

== Reception ==
Kiss's portrait was covered by pink paint, and "there is some argument as to whether or not the pink paint over Kiss’s face was done by Kiss herself or another artist. One rumor is that Kiss was so disappointed in all that she hadn’t accomplished by the age of 27, that she included paint to cover her face."

The artist received criticism focused on adding her portrait alongside great artists who have not crossed the age of 27. Others note the "pain which follows the disappearance of the sudden gratification of fame and the dangerous emptiness that follows."

Over the years since its creation in 2014 the work has become known as one of Israel's must-see street artworks, and according to From the Grapevine Magazine "the most popular in Florentin." Some locals define it as "sensational".

Outside of Israel, the work appeared in articles in Polish, Italian, Spanish, French, Indonesian, Russian, and others. Prints of it appeared in international museum exhibits. It is considered one of the top graffiti works in Israel. It became a symbol of the gentrification process in South Tel Aviv, as well as an icon of the city. Time Out Magazine cited this work among "The most beautiful in Tel Aviv."

== See also ==
- Art in Tel Aviv
- Street art
- List of street artists
