= Legionnaire hat =

Wide-brimmed hat designed to shade face and neck from the sun

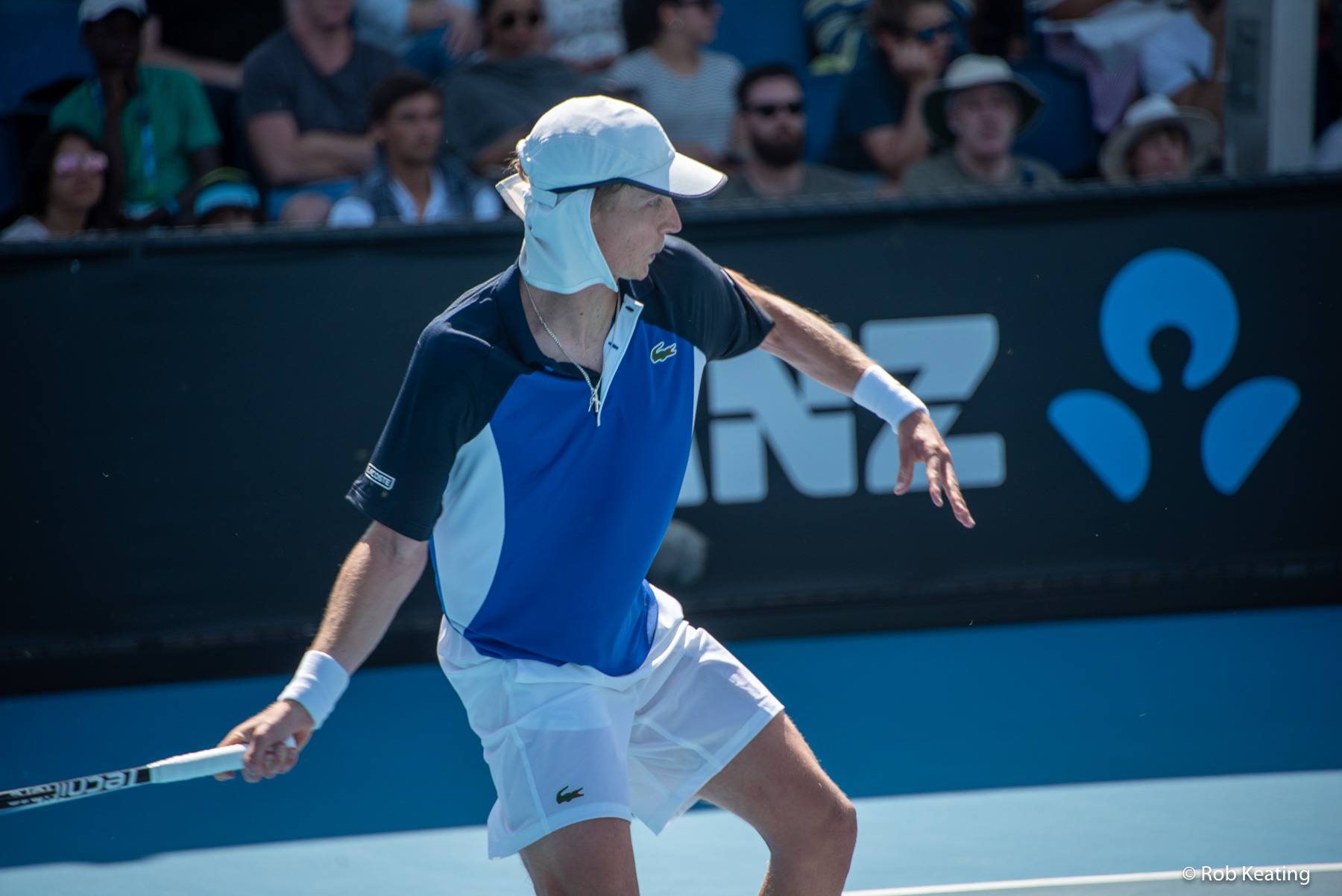
Australian tennis player Marc Polmans wearing the hat

A legionnaire hat, or legionnaires hat, is a wide-brimmed style of hat with a flap designed to provide sun protection for the forehead, ears, neck and shoulders. Known for having a neck flap or a "cape", the wrap-around Legionnaire's hat is most commonly used in Australia. Originating with the French Foreign Legion in the 19th century as a boxy flat cap, the hat was designed to provide maximum protection from the sun, featuring a cap with a brim to shield the face and a flap covering the neck, offering comprehensive protection against sunburn and heat-related illnesses.

== History ==
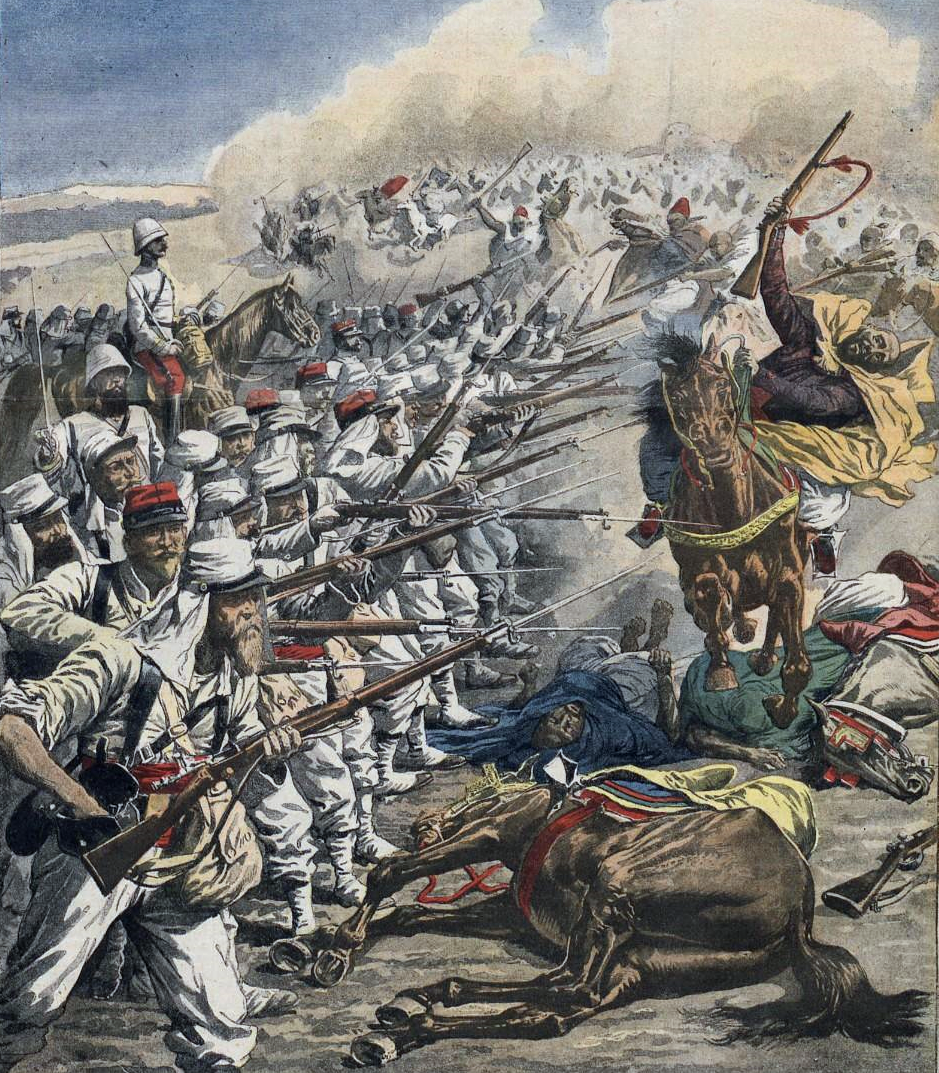
French Foreign Legion troops in Morocco wearing a similar hat

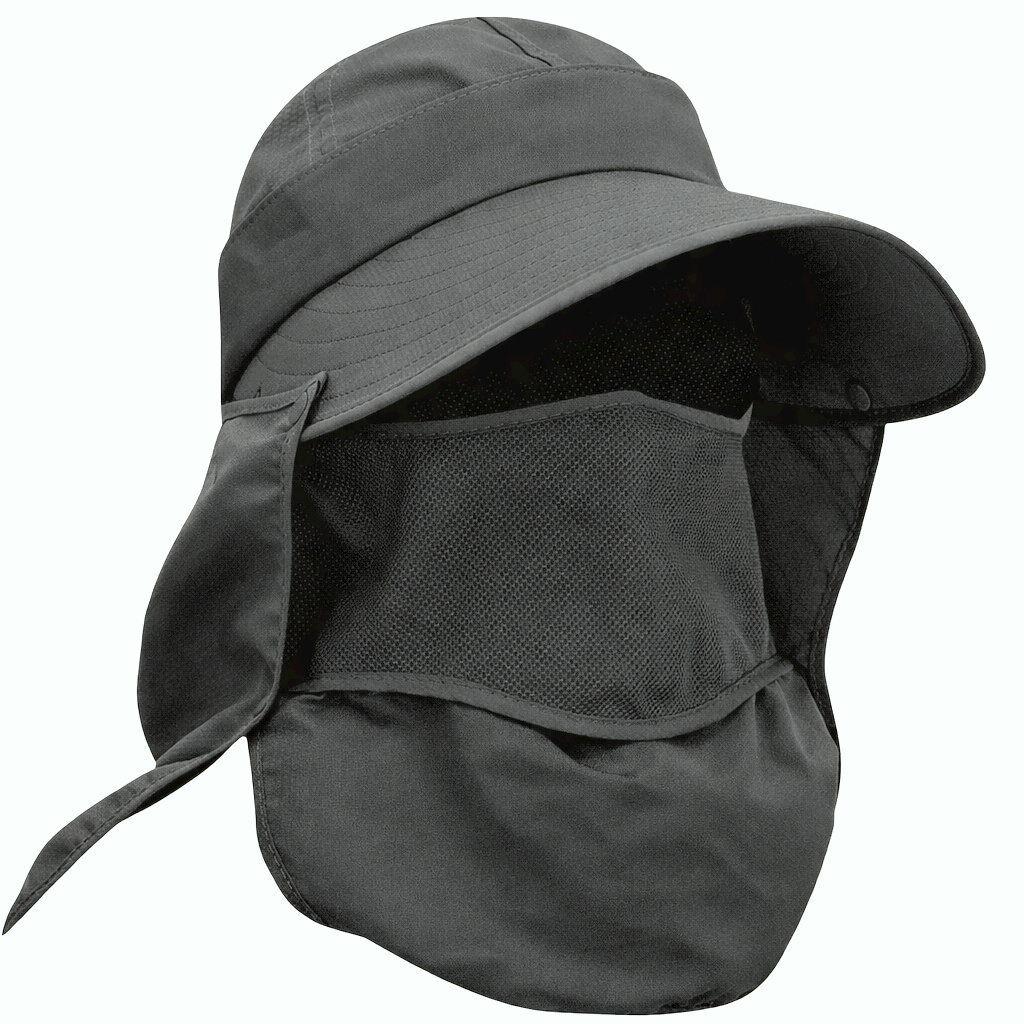
A type of legionnaire hat with a fine mesh panel designed to cover the face

The Legionnaire hat, named for the French Foreign Legion—a military unit founded in 1831, originated from the need for effective protection against intense desert sun exposure. The French Foreign Legion was particularly active in North African desert regions, where high temperatures and limited shade posed significant health risks. The hat's extended rear flap was designed to shield the neck from sunburn, helping to reduce heat-related illness among soldiers.

Originally developed for military use, the Legionnaire hat has since become widely adopted in civilian life. It is now commonly worn during Australian summers by outdoor workers to reduce occupational heat stress, recreational users, and schoolchildren, and is often associated with sun-safety awareness. Modern versions typically feature detachable neck flaps, adjustable cords, and lightweight, breathable materials. Many are manufactured with high ultraviolet protection factor (UPF) fabrics, making them well suited to Australia’s strong sun, while moisture-wicking properties in some designs improve comfort in warm or humid conditions.

== Design and use ==
A legionnaire hat provides coverage for the top of the head, as well as the ears, nose, forehead, chin, cheeks, and the back of the neck. Noted for its distinctive design and functional utility, the hat is produced in a variety of natural and synthetic fabrics, some of which are suitable for use in or near water. In Australia, where sun-safety education is introduced at an early age, the Legionnaire hat is commonly included in school uniforms. Its design provides broad sun protection, particularly for the neck and ears, helping to protect children's sensitive skin. Consequently, it is widely regarded by parents as a practical and essential item for children during summer.

Variants of the legionnaire hat include designs with a removable neck flap and an integrated face covering or scarf, resembling a balaclava. The mask, or mesh panel, of a foldable legionnaire hat is neck gaiter-like and features ventilation holes to allow drinking, while additional openings promote efficient heat dissipation. Depending on the design, the hat may be referred to in markets and in the literature by other names, such as flap cap, Sahara cap, desert cap, fishing hat, and foldable sun cap.

== Culture ==
The association with the French Foreign Legion, together with the hat’s distinctive design, has led to its presence in popular culture. The hat's cultural reception has varied, being described as “ugly,” “daggy,” and “cool.” The legionnaire hat has appeared in films, literature, and fashion, where it is often used to evoke themes of adventure, romance, and mystery. A legionnaire-style kepi with flaps is worn by Gene Hackman's character in March or Die (1977) and by Jean-Claude Van Damme's character in Legionnaire (1998). Furthermore, the legionnaire-style hat with flaps is worn by characters in films and other media depicting the French Foreign Legion, including The Foreign Legionnaire (1928), Trouble in Morocco (1937), Adventure in Sahara (1938), Beau Peep (1978–2016), Beau Geste (1982), The Last Remake of Beau Geste (1977) and The Mummy (1999).

In 2016, Triple J hosts Matt Okine and Alex Dyson launched a campaign to reintroduce the legionnaire hat. In 2021, the hat was featured in season two of I Think You Should Leave, which includes a skit devoted to a fedora version of it, in which a character mockingly describes it as "a fedora with safari flaps in the back." Tennis player Marc Polmans wore the hat at the 2020 Australian Open, where it was described as "flapping about like a millinery version of a tragic 1980s mullet" by The New Daily reporter Linda Pearce. In 2024, Field magazine listed the legionnaire hat as the best for sun protection, providing maximum coverage with a full-length flap that shields the neck and offers enhanced UV protection with UPF 50+ fabric.

== Gallery ==
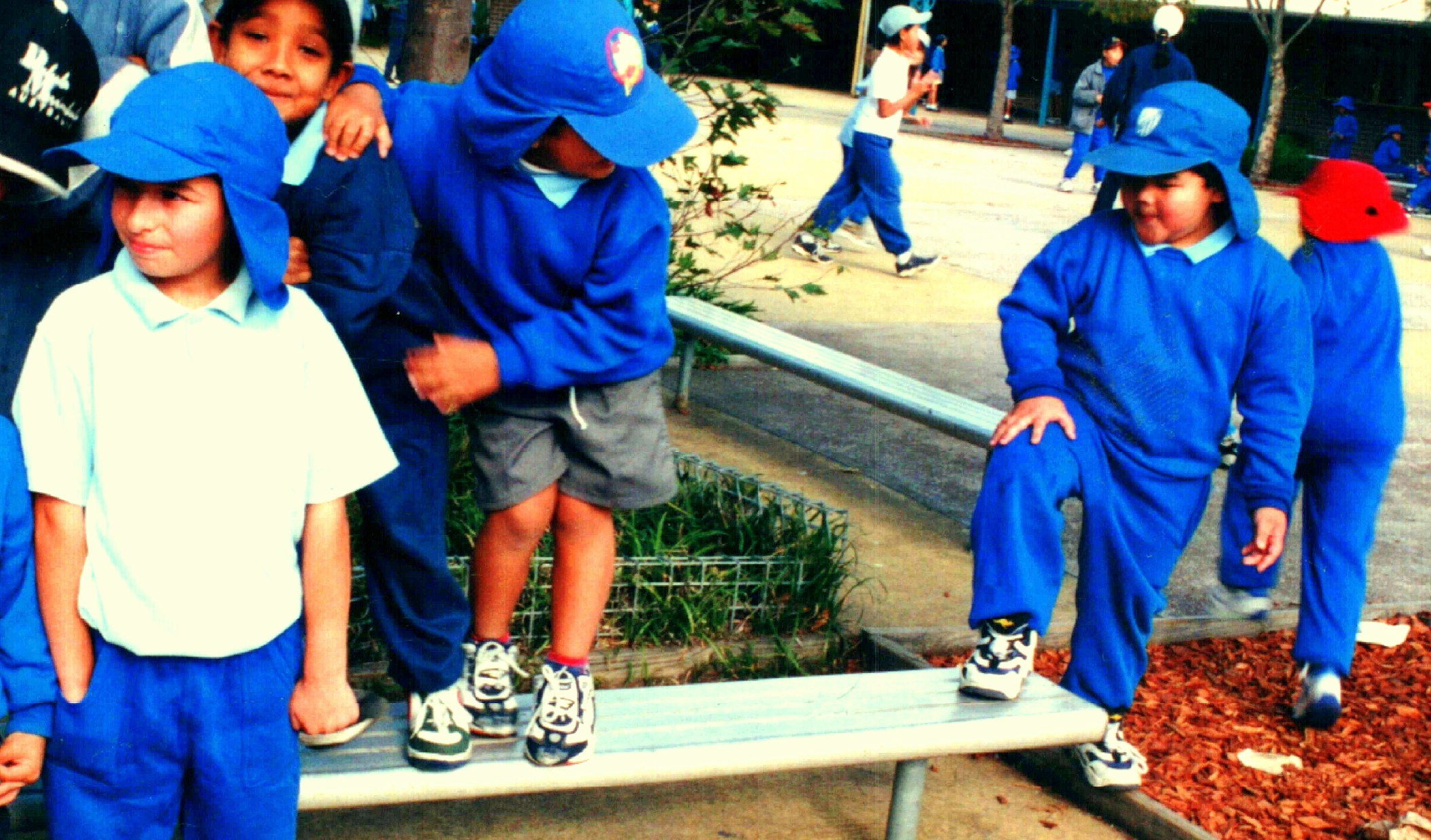
Schoolboys wearing legionnaire hats, Sydney, 2002

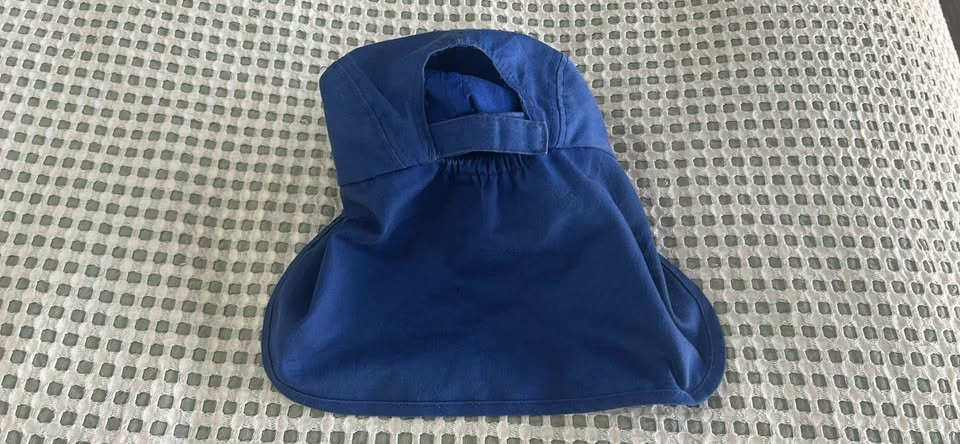
The hat's back flap

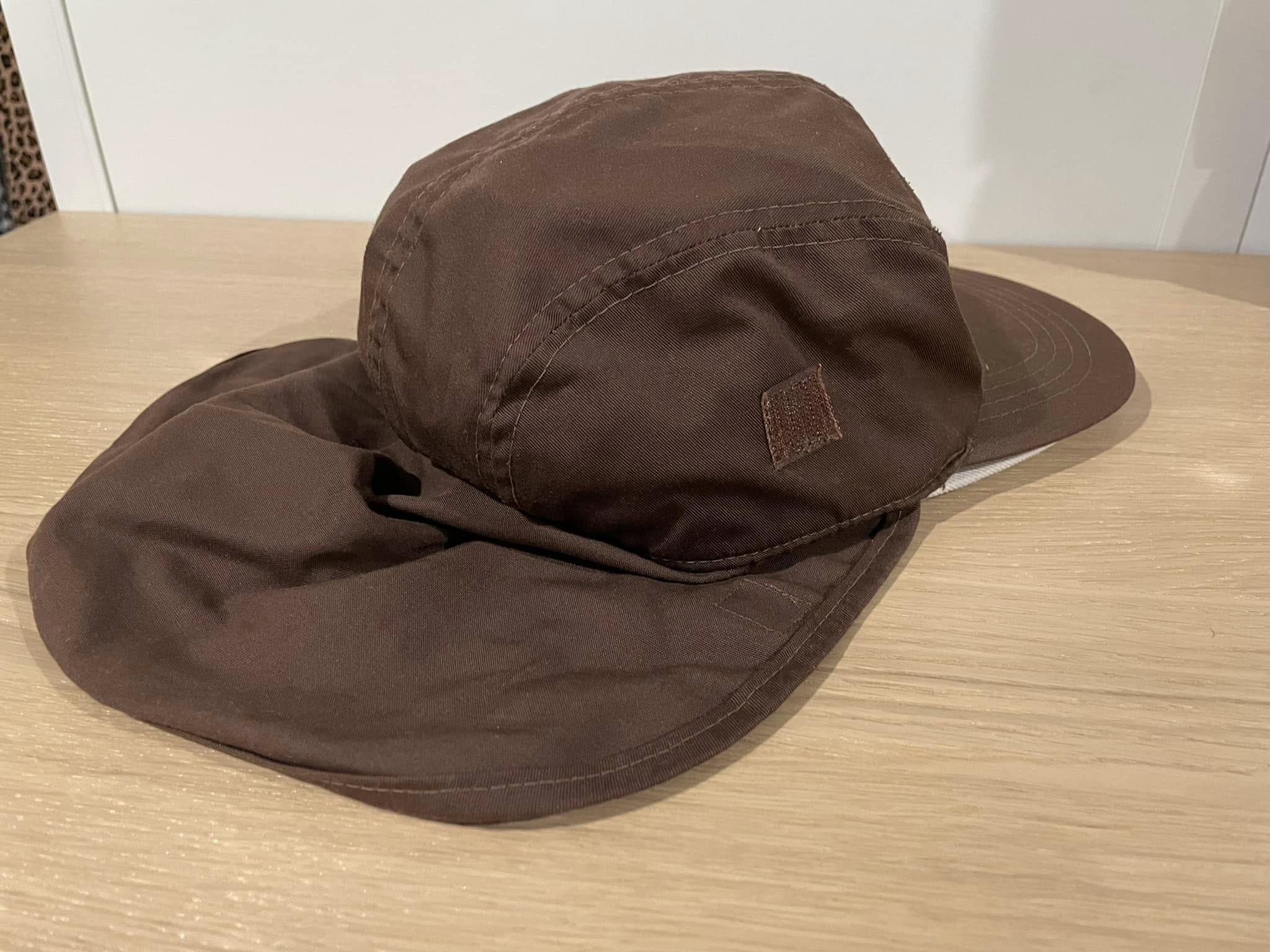
Side view of hat

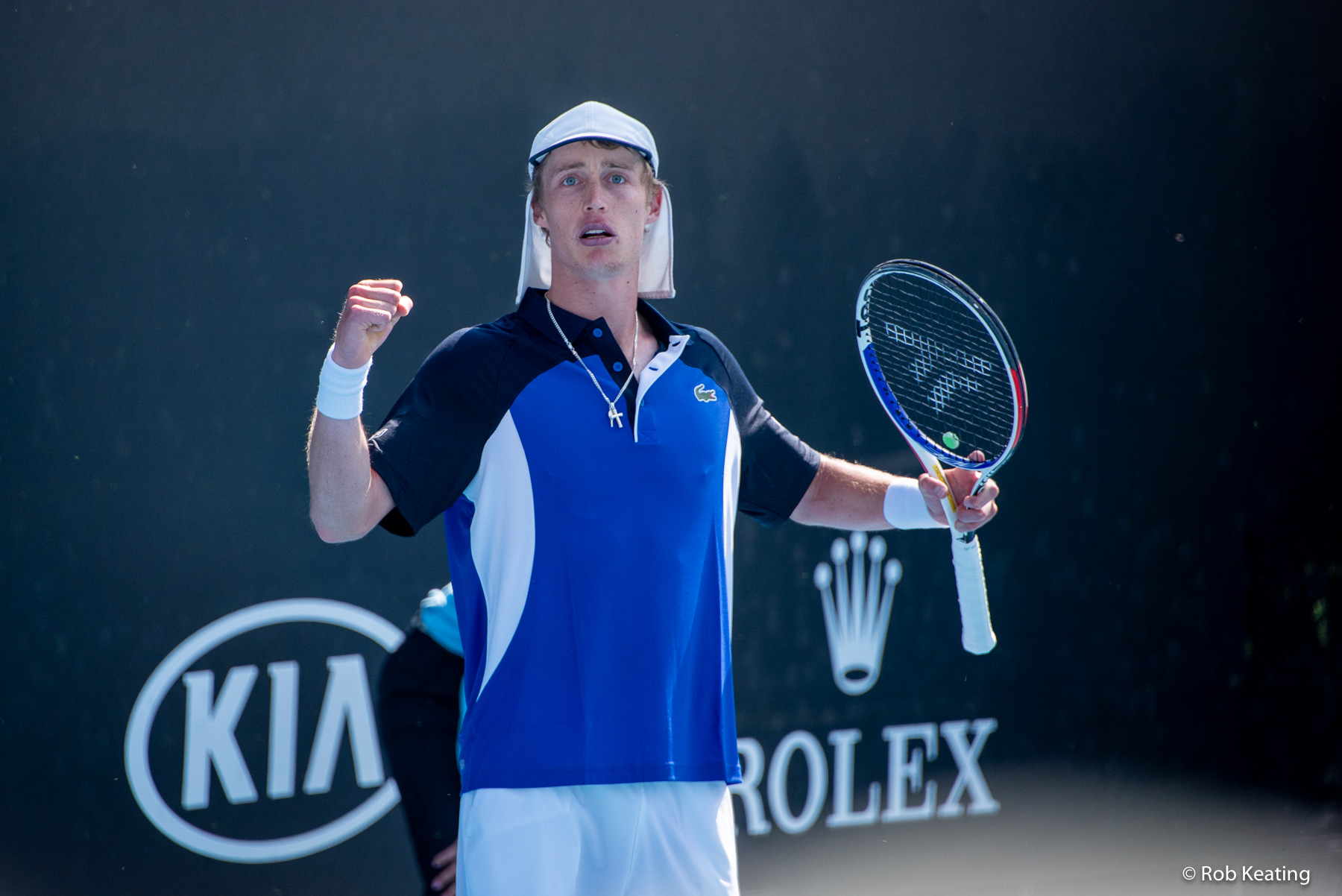
Front view, with tennis player Marc Polmans

== See also ==
- Sun hat
- Tembel hat
- Bucket hat
- Boonie hat
- Pith helmet
- Ushanka
- Leather flying helmet
