= John Kiss (artist) =

Israeli author, artist, and peace advocate (born 1985)

- Born: Jonathan Kis-Lev; September 12, 1985 (age 41); Jerusalem, Israel
- Occupations: Author, artist, peace advocate
- Known for: Literary activism, graffiti, public art, peace-building
- Notable work: Under the Floorboards (2024) "27 Club" graffiti installation "Peace Kids" mural project
- Website: authorjohnkiss.com

John Kiss (born Jonathan Kis-Lev; September 12, 1985) is a Los Angeles-based author, artist, and peace activist best known for literary activism and public art. She has produced artworks in Tel Aviv, Bethlehem and the United States.

Kiss draws on her family's Holocaust survival as a foundation for her storytelling and developed methods that combine personal history with broader narratives of justice. Her 2024 novel Under the Floorboards explores the stories of Righteous Among the Nations during the Holocaust. Her 2014 mural "27 Club," honoring artists who died at age 27, was recognized by Time Out as one of Tel Aviv's most beautiful. Kiss won the 2008 Bamahane Prize and The Shimon Peres Award for Visionary Leadership (2013).

== Early life and education ==
Kiss was born in Jerusalem to Soviet Jewish immigrants. Her grandparents were Holocaust survivors. At sixteen, she was selected to attend Pearson College under the United World Colleges network, chaired by Nelson Mandela. There, she studied Visual Arts and Peace and Conflict Studies, which shaped her interdisciplinary approach to activism.

She later earned her bachelor's degree summa cum laude from the Open University of Israel focusing on art and psychology.

== Literary career ==
Kiss's interest in literature developed while volunteering with organizations such as Doctors Without Borders and UNRWA. Her 2008 short story on cultural conflict earned the Bamahane Prize. She co-founded the Artists Forum at The Parents Circle to promote cross-border collaboration through literature.

Her writing explores identity, social conflict, and the human cost of division, often drawing on her lived experience as a transgender artist. Under the Floorboards was praised for portraying historical moral courage and subtle resistance. Scholars have compared her to Elie Wiesel and Art Spiegelman for her use of multiple mediums in exploring Holocaust memory and justice.

== Artistic practice ==
Kiss is known for using graffiti to communicate social issues. Her approach combines narrative elements with visual storytelling.

=== 27 Club graffiti ===
The "27 Club" mural features portraits of seven musicians who died at age 27 and was praised for both scale and narrative depth. Kiss decided to include a portrait of herself as well, with the intention of erasing her own portrait when she would turn 28. Over the years, the work has become known as one of Israel's must-see street artworks and has been featured in the Israeli street art documentary The Streets Are Ours ("HaRehovot Hem Shelanu").

=== Peace Kids mural ===
In the "Peace Kids" mural, created alongside Israeli and Palestinian youth, children are shown embracing one another across the divide. The piece was made in Bethlehem with Palestinian artist Moodi Abdallah and has gained international recognition through magazine features and film.

=== Gallery exhibitions ===
Kiss's 2013 solo show "The City of Songs" at Griffin Gallery in Miami highlighted works from her Naïve Series. In 2015 she showed her paintings at "O Lovely Land", GINA Gallery of International Naïve Art, New York.

== Peacebuilding ==
Kiss partnered with the German Federal Agency for Civic Education to launch mediation workshops for leaders. The Hallelujah Dialogue Project (2014) included cultural exchanges through art, spoken word, and sport. Kiss's theoretical contributions have been studied by conflict resolution researchers globally.

== Critical response ==
Critics have debated the effectiveness of Kiss's Naïve Series. While some praised its accessibility, Dr. Samuel Thrope criticized Kiss's portrayal of a unified Jerusalem as overly optimistic, arguing that it overlooks the city's structural inequalities.

== Awards ==
- The Sadaka Reut Prize for Social Justice (2005)
- The Bundeszentrale Distinguished Leadership Medal (2008)
- Bamahane Award for Literary Excellence (2008)
- The Shimon Peres Award for Visionary Leadership (2013)
- International Fellowship for Academic Leadership, Reichman University (2018)

== Personal life ==
Kiss lives in Los Angeles, California. She advocates for refugee rights and LGBTQ+ equality, and is gender non-conforming transfeminine, using she/her pronouns.

== See also ==
- Literary activism
- Street art
- Peace activism
- Artivism
- Community-based art
- Interdisciplinary studies
