= Handala =

Symbol and personification of the Palestinian people

- Handala, the Palestinian defiance symbol
- First appearance: Al-Seyassah; 13 July 1969
- Last appearance: 1987
- Created by: Naji al-Ali

In-universe information
- Full name: حنظلة
- Gender: Male
- Occupation: 10 year old child
- Affiliation: Justice, steadfastness (see sumud), poverty
- Origin: Palestinian refugee
- Nationality: Palestinian

Handala (Arabic: حنظلة, romanized: Ḥanẓala), also Handhala, Hanzala or Hanthala, is a prominent national symbol and personification of the Palestinian people.

The character was created in 1969 by political cartoonist Naji al-Ali, and first took its current form in 1973. Handala became the signature of Naji al-Ali's cartoons and remains an iconic symbol of Palestinian identity and defiance. The character has been described as "portraying war, resistance, and the Palestinian identity with astounding clarity".

== Early publication ==
Handala appeared for the first time on Kuwaiti newspaper Al-Seyassah on 13 July 1969, and first turned his back to the viewer and clasped his hands behind his back from 1973 onwards.

== Usage ==
Current usages of the Handala motif include:

- The web mascot of the Iranian Green Movement
- In Israeli artwork, particularly alongside the Israeli character Srulik
- The ship used in the July 2025 Gaza Freedom Flotilla which challenged the Israeli naval blockade of Gaza was named after it.

== Gallery ==
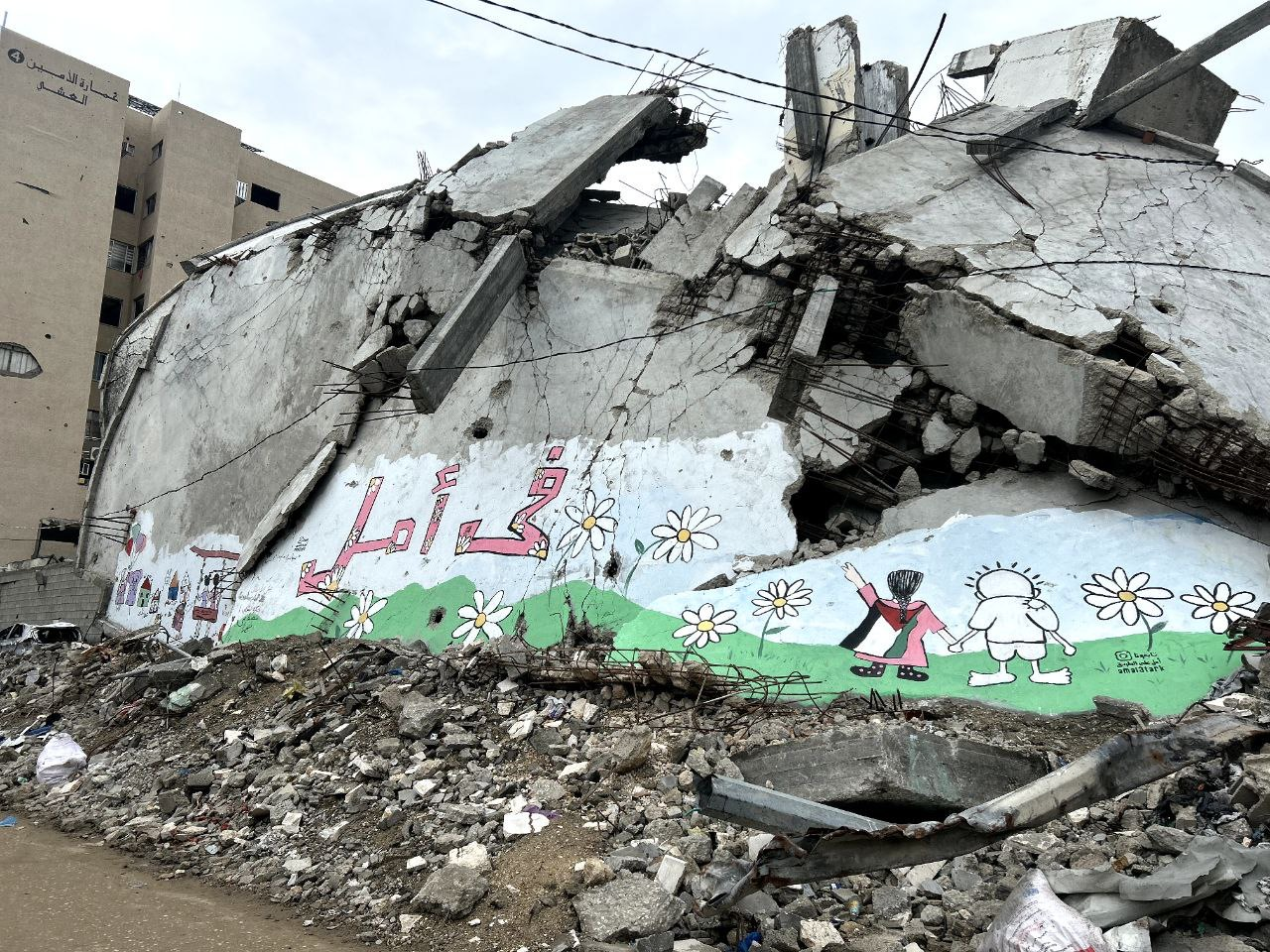
A mural featuring Handala on rubble from a destroyed building in Gaza City; the text reads 'There is hope' in Palestinian Arabic

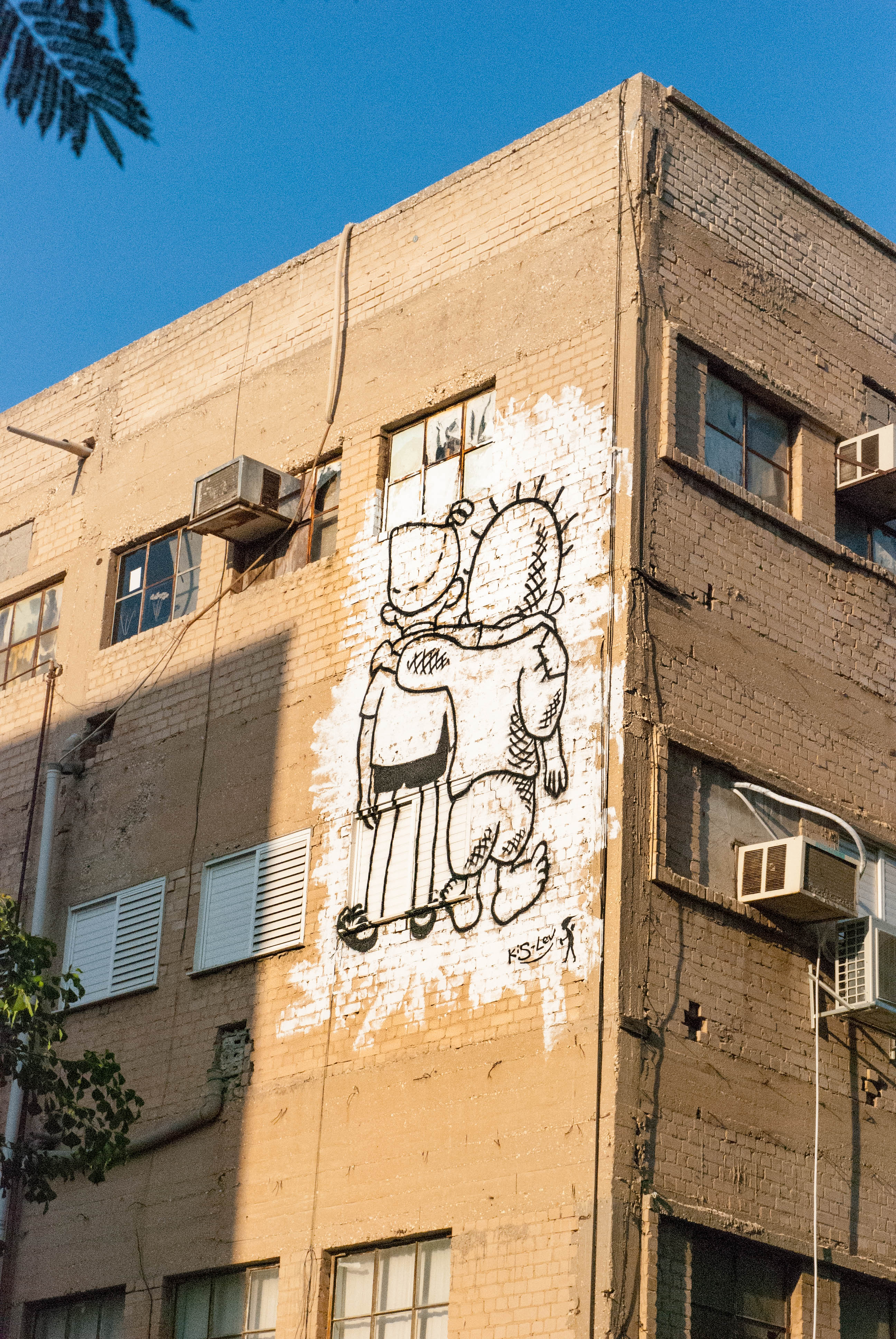
The Peace Kids mural in Florentin, Tel Aviv, with Handala and Srulik

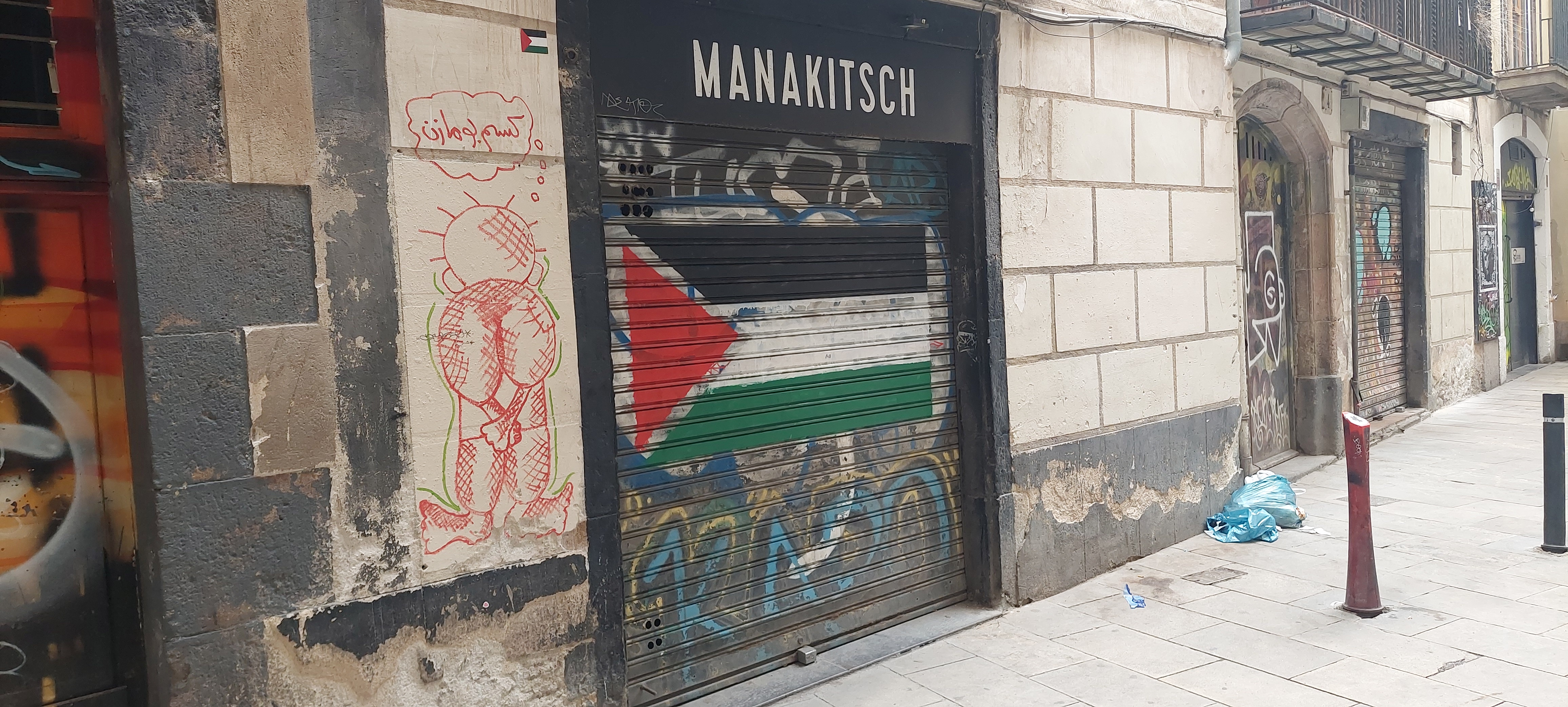
Graffiti outside a Levantine restaurant in Barcelona; the balloon reads 'Fuck Abu Mazen' in Palestinian Arabic

== See also ==
- Culture of Palestine
- List of national symbols of Palestine

== Bibliography ==
- Singh, Ashutosh (1 October 2019). "Time and Waiting: The Fulcrum of Palestinian Identity". Arab Studies Quarterly. 41 (4). doi:10.13169/arabstudquar.41.4.0317. S2CID 214325563.
- Olin, Margaret (2019). "How Long Will Handala Wait? A Ten-Year-Old Barefoot Refugee Child on Palestinian Walls". Timescapes of Waiting. pp. 176–197. doi:10.1163/9789004407121_012. ISBN 978-90-04-40712-1. S2CID 203233320.
- Habashi, Janette (2017). "The Evolvement of National Identity: A Never-Ending Process". Political Socialization of Youth. pp. 151–175. doi:10.1057/978-1-137-47523-7_8. ISBN 978-1-137-47522-0.
- Gandolfo, K. Luisa (1 January 2010). "Representations of Conflict". Radical History Review. 2010 (106): 47–69. doi:10.1215/01636545-2009-020.
- Woźniak, Marta (2014). "Mirror, Mirror on the Wall: Polititcal Cartoons of the Arab Spring". Hemispheres. Studies on Cultures and Societies. 29 (2): 79–97.
