= Herzl Award =

Herzl Award refers to:

- Herzl Award (WJC) - An award given by the World Jewish Congress
- Herzl Award (ZOA) - An award given by the Zionist Organization of America since 1959.
- Herzl Award (Hungarian Jewry) - An award given by "Bnei Herzl" association since 1966.
- Herzl Award (Herzliya) - An award given by the municipality of Herzliya since 1974.
- Herzl Award (WZO) - An award given by the World Zionist Organization since 2004.
