= List of national symbols of Israel =

National symbols of Israel are the symbols that are used in Israel and abroad to represent the country and its people.

== National flag – flag of Israel ==
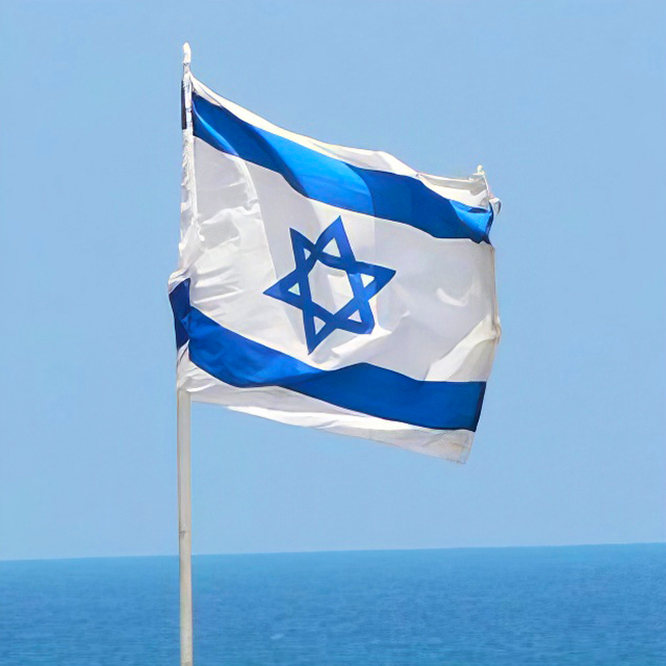
Flag of Israel

The flag of Israel is the official flag of the State of Israel, which represents the state, its sovereignty, its institutions, and its citizens both in Israel and worldwide. This flag has a white background and two horizontal blue stripes, charged with a blue Star of David (Magen David) in the middle.

The flag was conceived during the period of the First Aliyah and was adopted as the flag of the Zionism since the movement's inception in 1897. The flag was officially chosen as the flag of the State of Israel on 28 October 1948, and was favoured over other flag proposals mainly due to its popularity among the Jewish population of Israel.

The two blue stripes represent a tallit or prayer shawl, and both sides of the split Red Sea that the Hebrews walked through as written in the Book of Exodus.

The Star of David also represents the Jewish identity of Israel, as well as the culture and history of the Jewish people.

== National emblem – emblem of Israel ==
Emblem of Israel

The emblem of Israel is an escutcheon which contains a menorah in its center, two olive branches on both sides of the menorah and at the bottom the label "Israel" in Hebrew.

The emblem was designed by brothers Gabriel and Maxim Shamir, and was officially chosen on 10 February 1949 from among many other proposals submitted as part of a 1948 design competition.

== National anthem – "Hatikvah" ==
The words of Israel's national anthem, "Hatikvah"

"Hatikvah" is the national anthem of Israel. The anthem was written in 1878 by Naphtali Herz Imber, a secular Galician Jew from Zolochiv (today in Lviv Oblast), who moved to the Land of Israel in the early 1880s. The music to Hatikvah was composed by Samuel (Shmuel) Cohen, adapted from a Romanian folk song, in 1888. The poem was subsequently adopted as the anthem of Hovevei Zion and later of the Zionist Movement at the First Zionist Congress in 1897. The text subsequently underwent a number of other changes.

"Hatikvah" is one of only a few national anthems in the world which is in a minor scale, such as "Mila Rodino" (Bulgaria) and "Menıñ Qazaqstanym" (Kazakhstan); the anthems of some other Asian countries are of a different tonality such as Japan and Nepal. Though it sounds mournful, the song is optimistic and uplifting as the title (which means "hope") suggests. The anthem's theme revolves around the nearly 2,000-year-old hope of the Jewish people for freedom and sovereignty in the Land of Israel, a national dream that was later realised with the founding of the modern State of Israel in 1948.

== National colors – blue and white ==
The national colours of Israel are officially blue and white as seen on the flag of Israel. The origin of the combination of these colors is from the Bible, in which they are mentioned in several instances.

Blue and white are also the traditional team colours of the Israel national sporting teams.

== Unofficial national symbols ==
The following nation symbols are unofficial. They were often chosen by selection processes held or sponsored by government agencies, but they have no official legal status.

=== National bird – Hoopoe ===
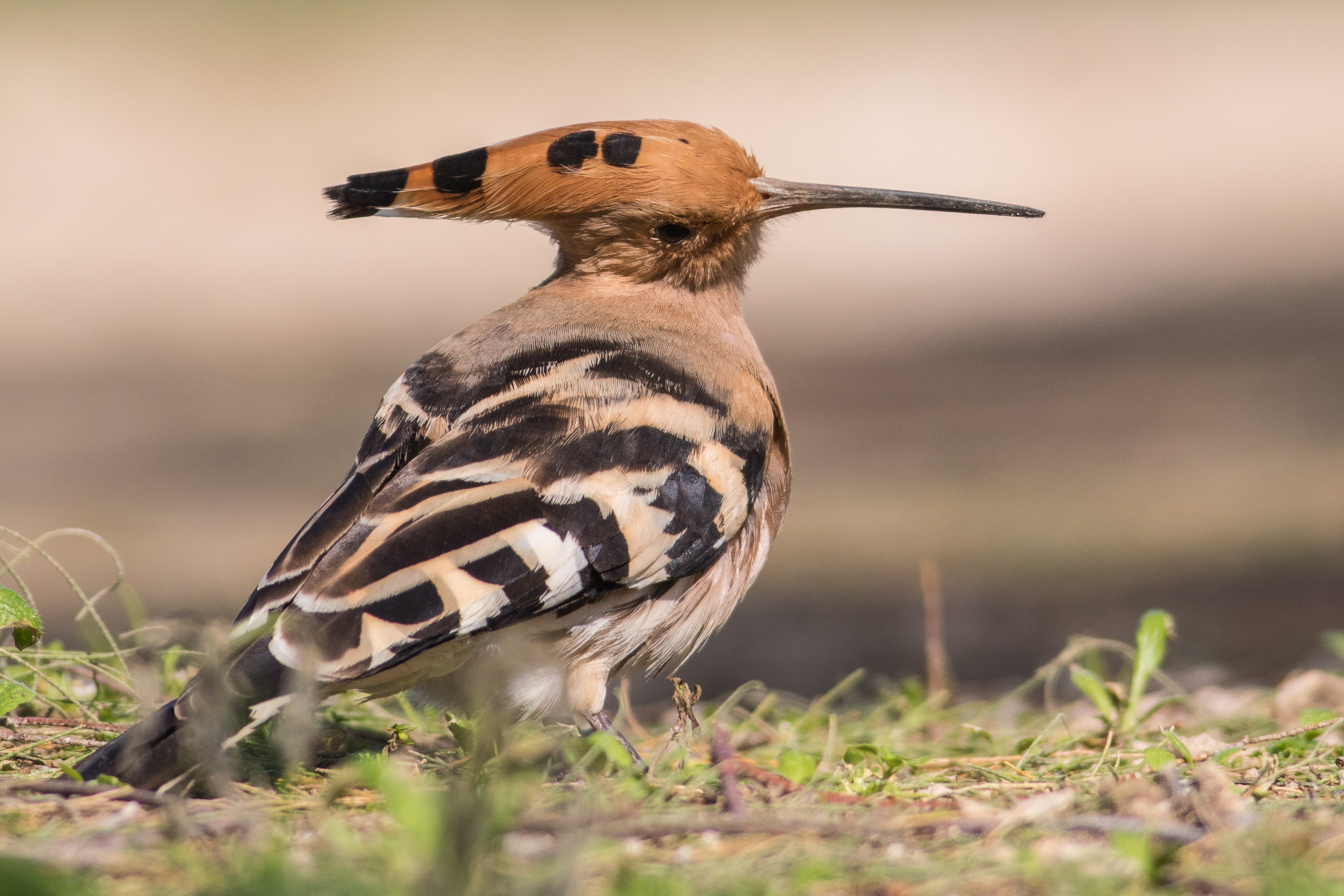
Hoopoe bird

The hoopoe (דוכיפת) was chosen as the national bird of the State of Israel in May 2008 in conjunction with the country's 60th anniversary, following a national survey of 155,000 citizens, outpolling the white-spectacled bulbul.

The hoopoe was declared as the national bird of the State of Israel on 29 May 2008 by President Shimon Peres.

=== National flower – Anemone coronaria ===
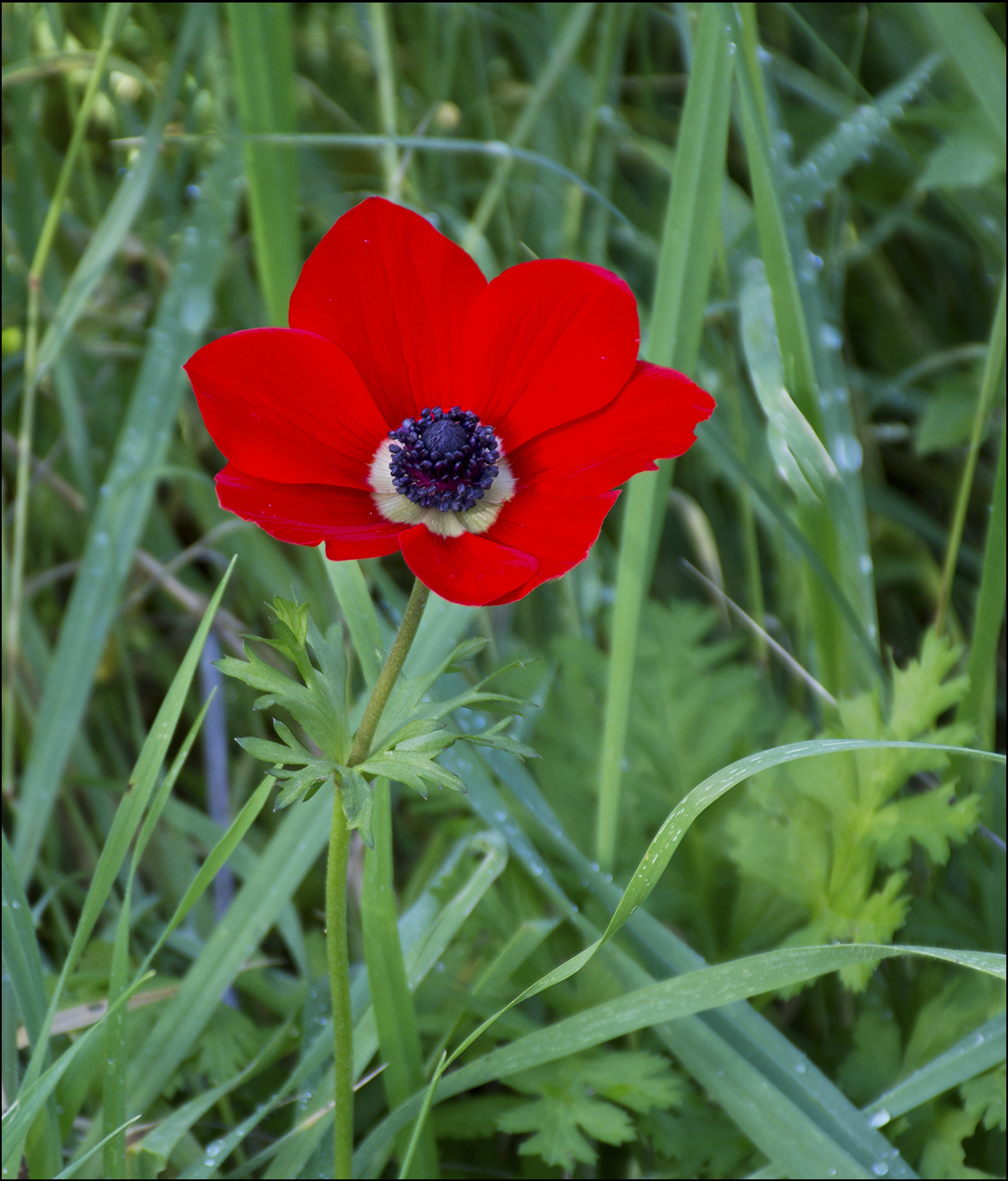
National flower of Israel

In September 2007 the cyclamen (רקפת, more exactly Cyclamen persicum) was elected as the national flower of the State of Israel and as its official representative in the botanical exhibition "We Are One World" held in Beijing. The cyclamen won over by a small margin over the Anemone coronaria (6,509 compared with 6,053 votes) in a poll conducted among visitors of the popular Israeli website Ynet. However, in November 2013 the Society for the Protection of Nature in Israel (החברה להגנת הטבע) and Ynet arranged a larger poll, in which the Anemone coronaria (כלנית מצויה) was elected as Israel's national flower.

=== National dog – Canaan Dog ===
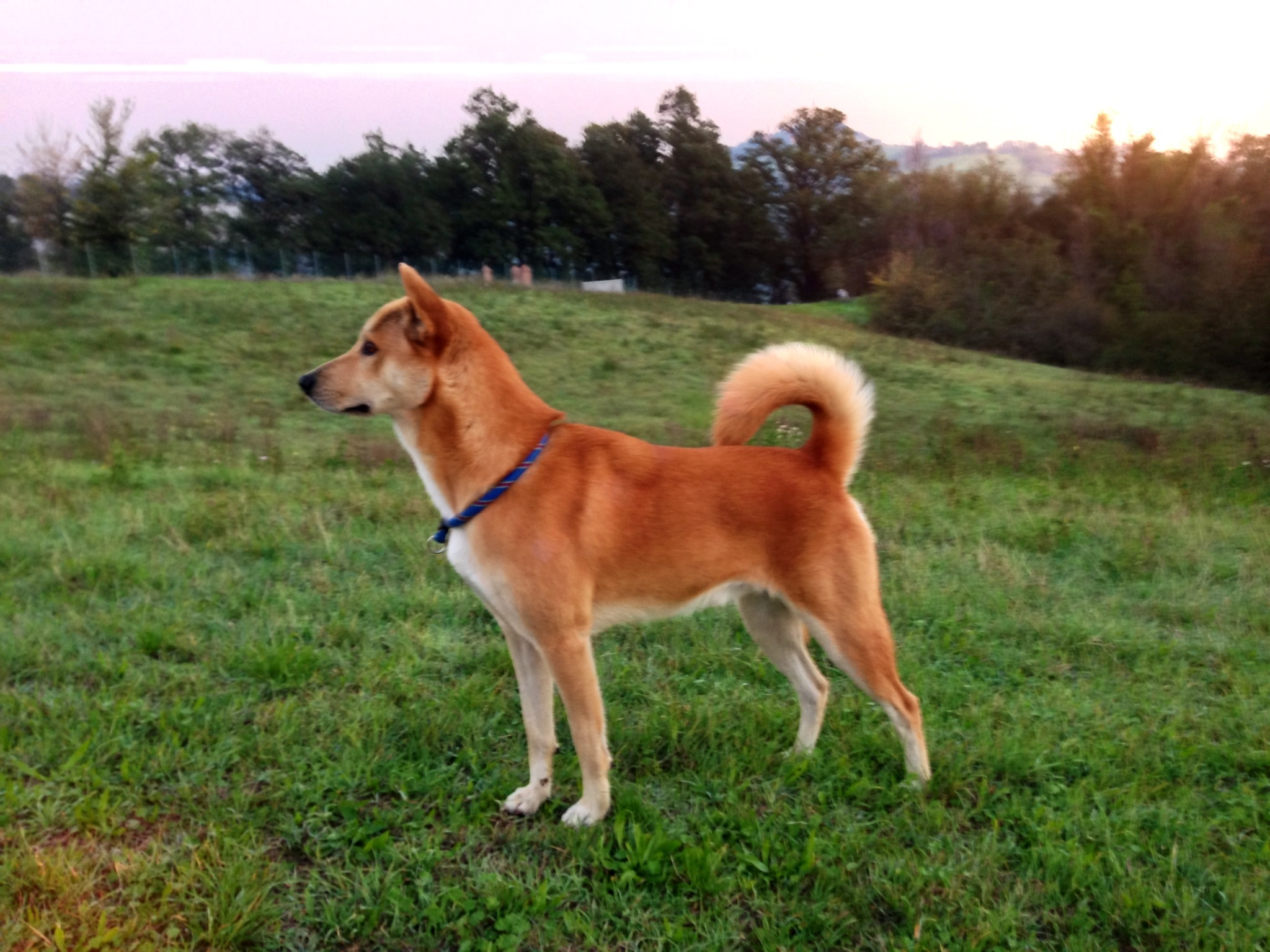
Canaan Dog

The Canaan Dog (כלב כנעני) is the national dog breed of Israel. The Canaan Dog is a member of the pariah-type dogs, a sub family of the spitz group of dogs. The Canaan Dog has been very common in the Southern Levant region, from Sinai to Syria.

The breed was recognized by the Israeli Association of Dog Handlers in 1963 and in 1966 the breed was also recognized as Israel's national dog breed by the Fédération Cynologique Internationale.

=== National reptile - Daboia palaestinae ===
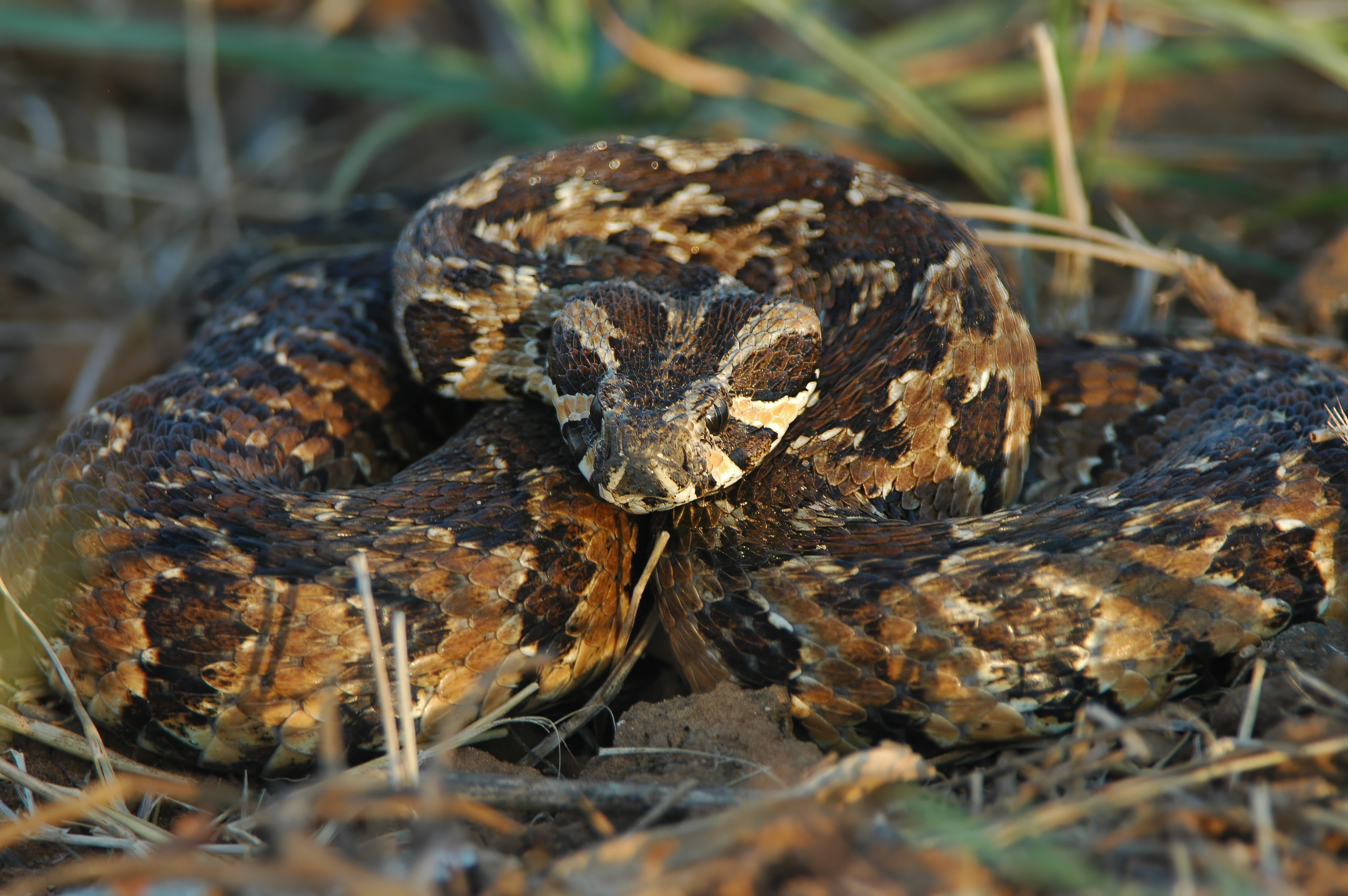
Daboia palaestinae

The Daboia palaestinae (צפע ארצישראלי - "Land of Israel's viper") was elected as the national serpent of Israel in 2018. The selection followed a public campaign initiated by Avi Zobel, founder of the "Reptiles of Israel" initiative. This is Israel's most common venomous snake and it is responsible for the most deaths from snakebite, even though its venom is less potent than the venom found in Atractaspis engaddensis, Israel's most venomous snake.

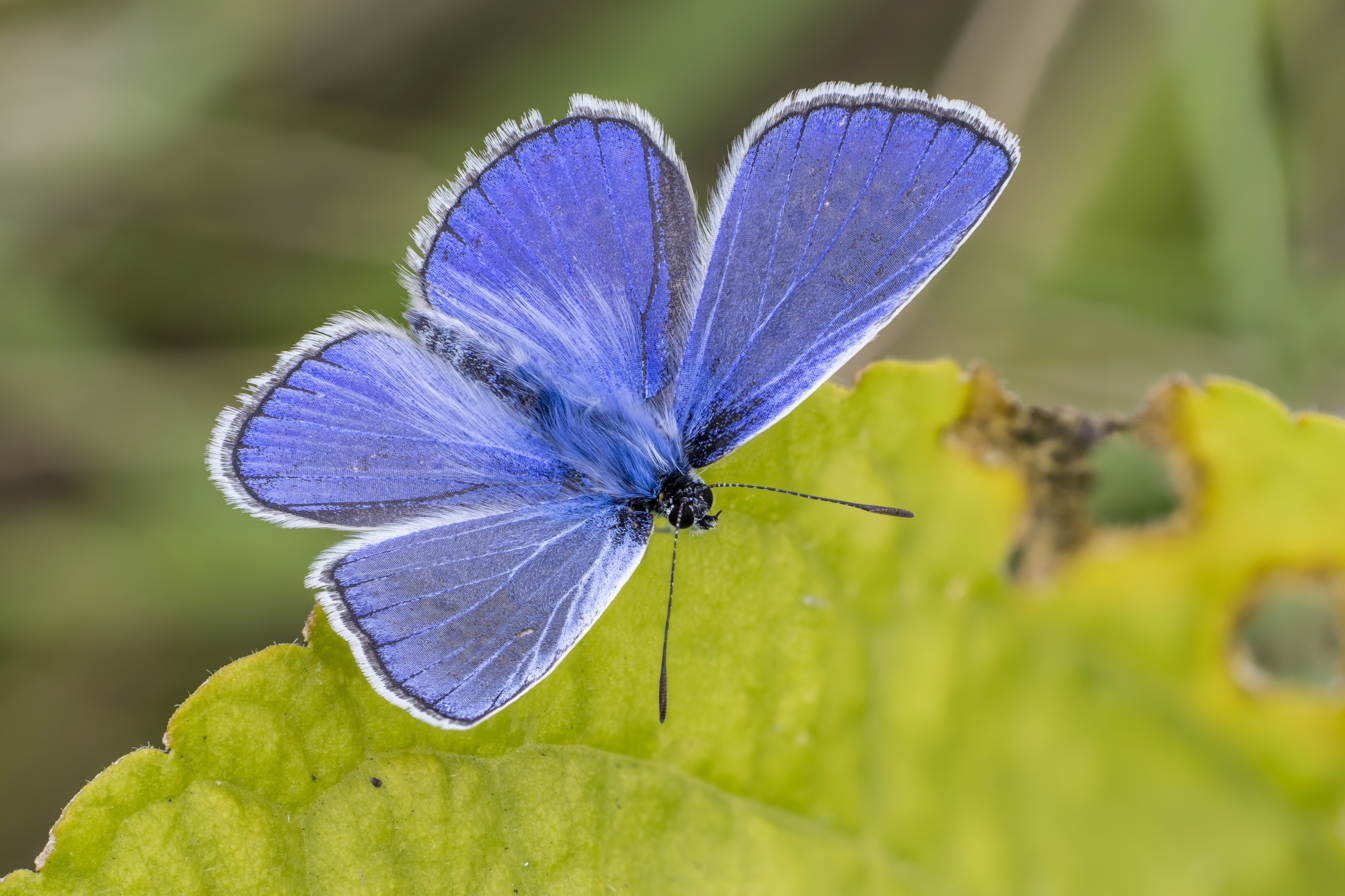
Common blue butterfly

=== National butterfly – Common blue ===
The Common blue (כחליל השברק, Polyommatus icarus) was elected as the national butterfly of the State of Israel in 2023.

=== National tree - Olive ===
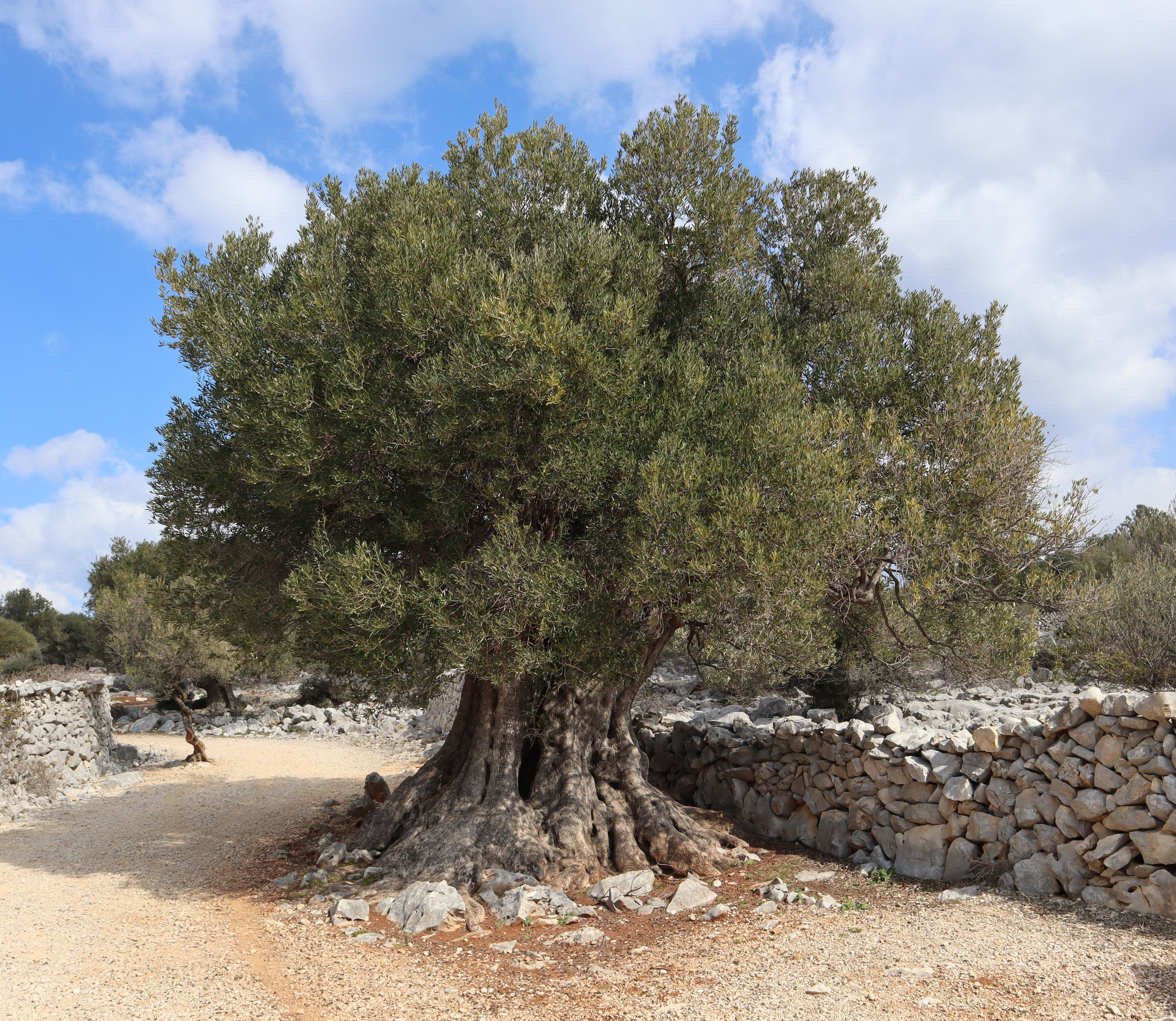
Olive - national tree

The olive was elected as the national tree of Israel in 2021, with a plurality of 33% vote polled by the Jewish National Fund.

== See also ==
- Lion of Judah
- List of flags of Israel
- Srulik
