= Srulik =

Character personification of Israel

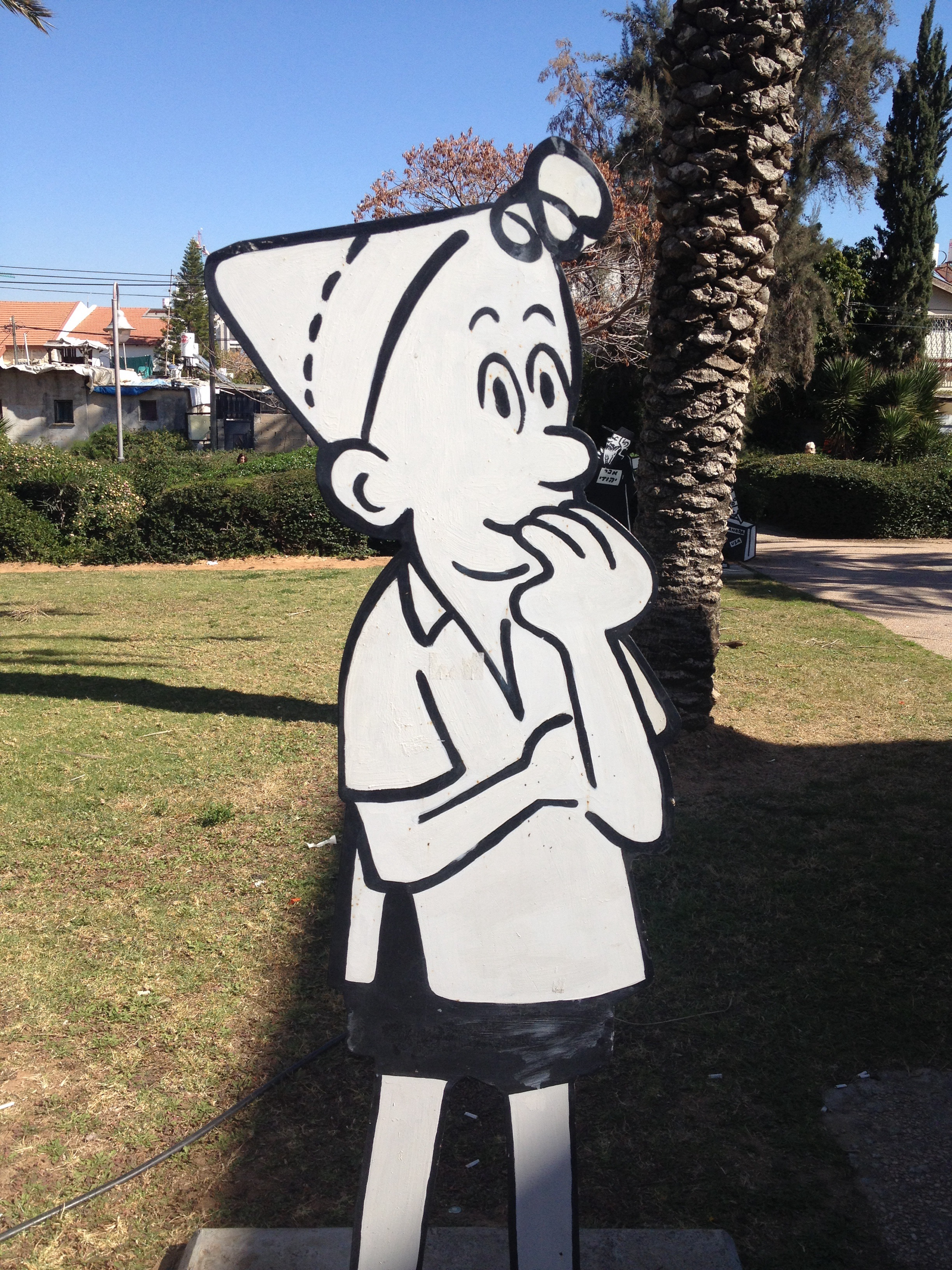
Srulik in the Israeli museum of cartoons and comics in Holon, Israel

Srulik enlisted

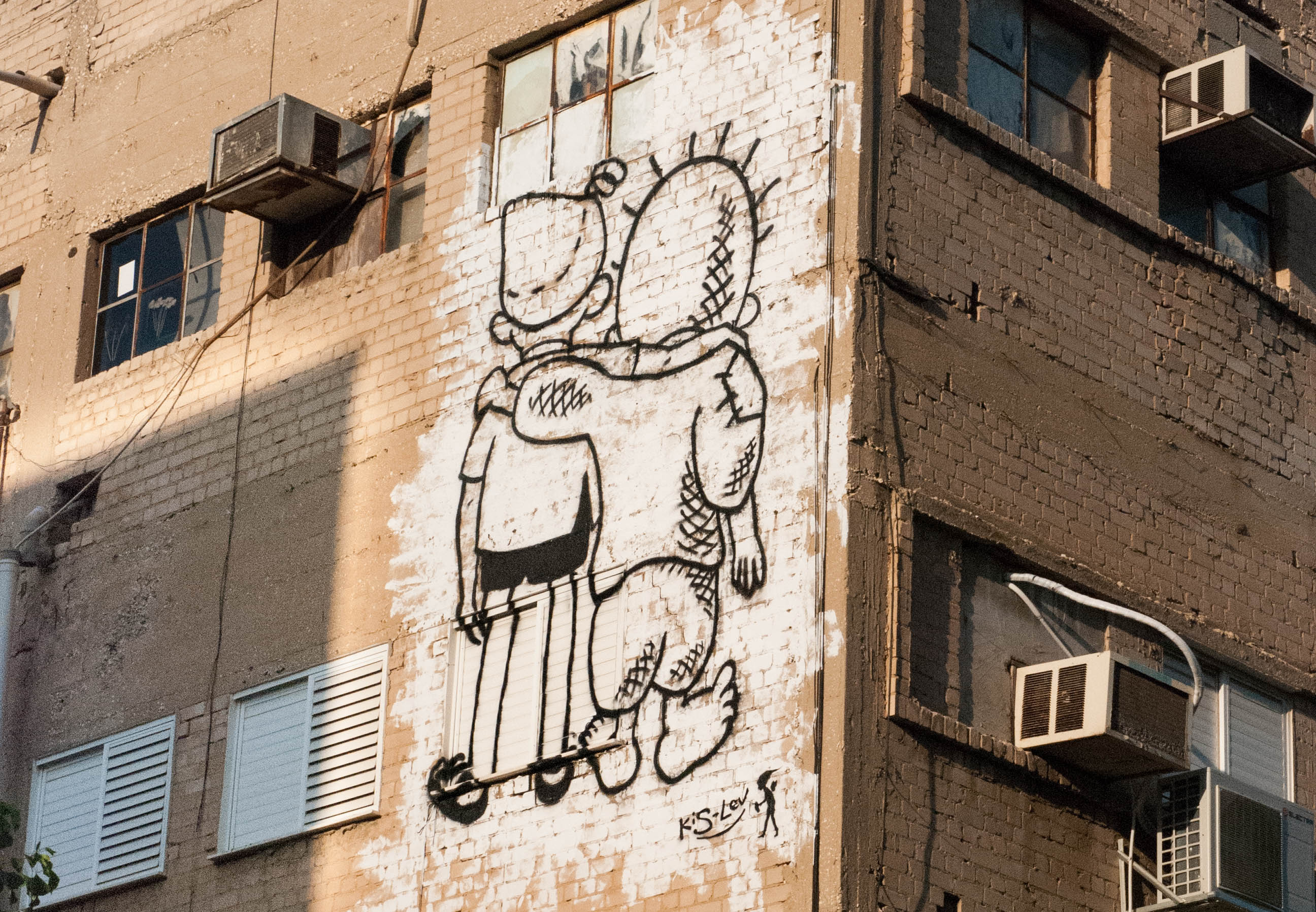
The Peace Kids in Florentin depicting Israeli Srulik and Palestinian Handala embracing one another

Srulik (Hebrew: שרוליק, IPA: [ˈsʁulik]) is a cartoon character symbolizing Israel. The character was created in 1956 by the Israeli cartoonist Kariel Gardosh, known by his pen name Dosh.

The name originates in Yiddish, where it is a diminutive form for the name Israel.

The cartoon appeared for many years in the newspaper Maariv. Yosef Lapid, Dosh's colleague on the editorial board of Maariv, described Srulik as an icon of Israel in the same way that Marianne and Columbia were respectively icons of France and the United States.

== Description ==
Srulik is generally depicted as a young man or teenager wearing a tembel hat, Biblical sandals, and khaki shorts. Dosh drew Srulik in cartoons on current events for Maariv, and also for various "specials" and occasions of the young state. During wartime, Srulik put on a uniform and was drafted to raise the national morale.

== Symbolism ==
Many have pointed out Srulik's function as an antithesis of the antisemitic caricatures which appeared in Der Stürmer and other European and Arab journals. As against the stereotype of the weak or cunning Jew that was propagated by Joseph Goebbels, Dosh—a Holocaust survivor—drew a proud, strong and sympathetic Jewish character. The journalist Shalom Rosenfeld, editor of Maariv in 1974–1980, wrote:

Srulik became not only a mark of recognition of [Dosh's] amazing daily cartoons, but an entity standing on its own, as a symbol of the Land of Israel – beautiful, lively, innocent ... and having a little chutzpah, and naturally also of the new Jew. Because of our history and our religion and the relations between us and the nations that absorbed us in their countries and cultures, stereotypes were created, mostly not so positive of the Jewish man. In the works of the greatest artists of prose, poetry and painting these stereotypes moved between a Wandering Jew, restless, tragic and pathetic and the hunchbacked, crooked-nosed, fleshy-lipped Jew with a pack of banknotes in his pockets, a prototype of the Shakespearean Shylock and The Jew Süss, in Goebbelsian interpretation, and in the modern times of many caricaturists in the Arab countries.

— Shalom Rosenfeld, Maariv, February 2, 2001

=== Handala ===
Srulik has been compared to Handala, the Palestinian national personification (which appeared later), and has appeared together with Handala in murals supporting the two-state solution.

== See also ==
- Sabra (person)
- Culture of Israel
- Negation of the Diaspora
