= Street art in Israel =

Street art Israel

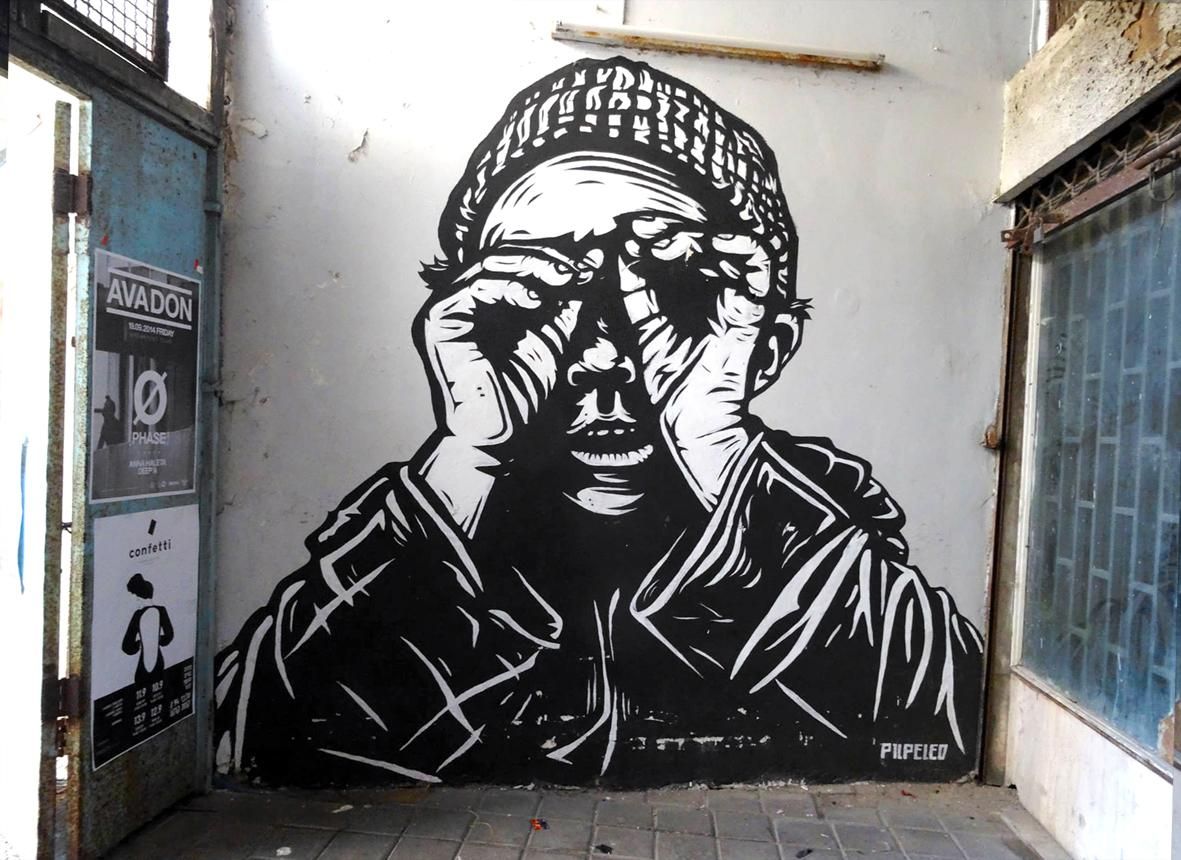
Graffiti by Pilpeled in Tel Aviv

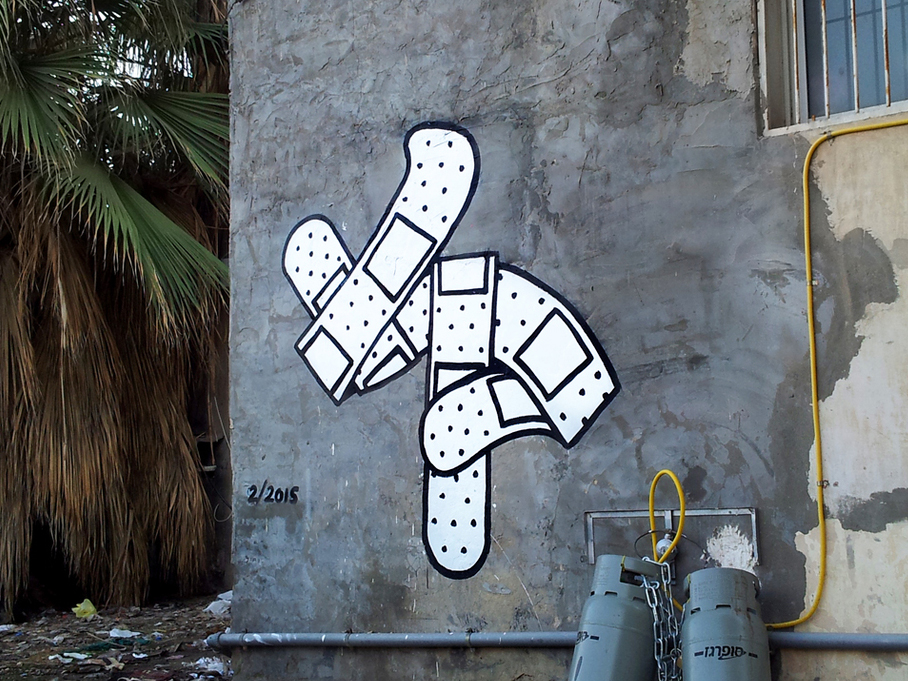
Graffiti by Dede in South Tel Aviv, at 23 Shvil Akko

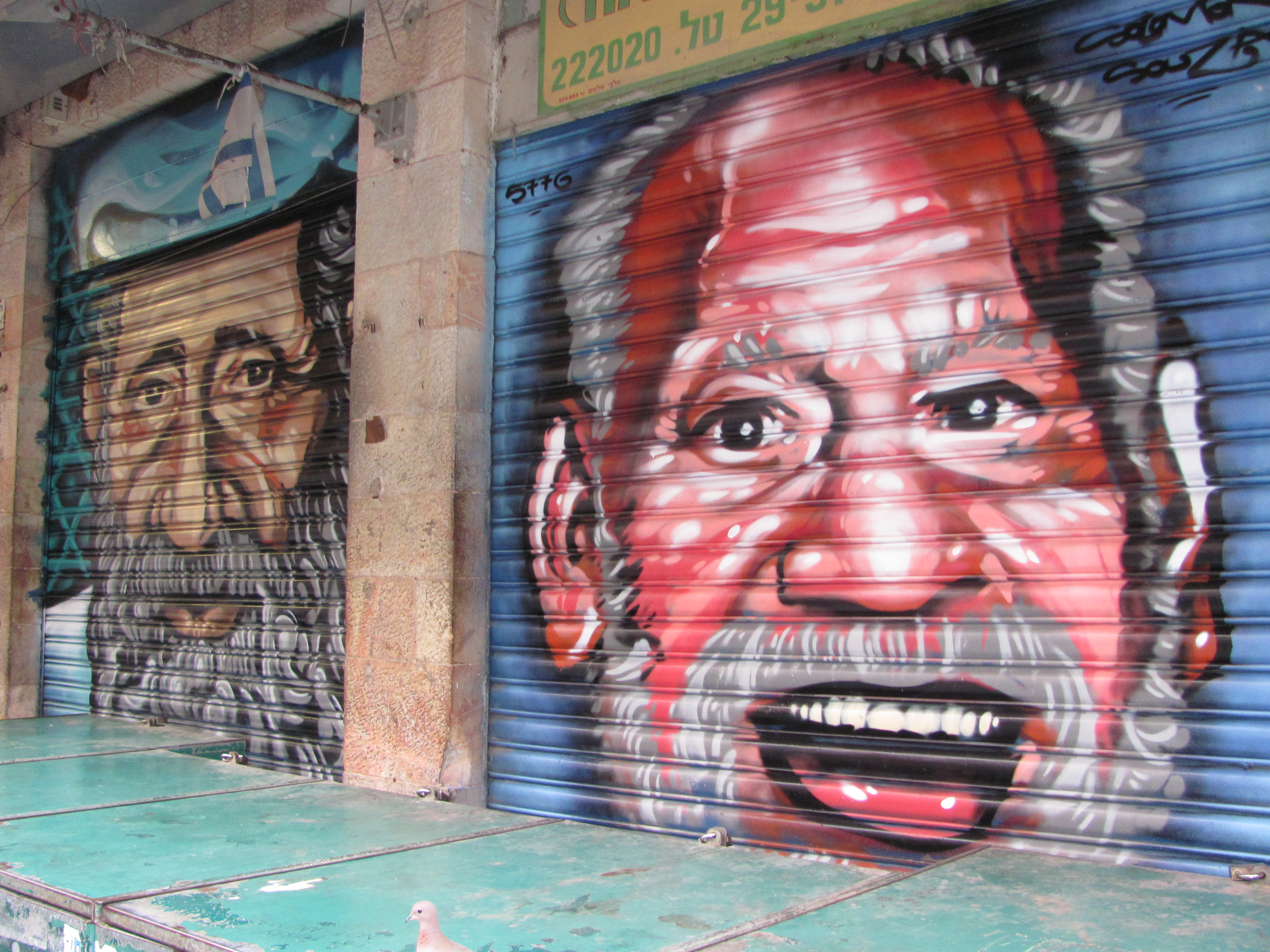
Solomon Souza's graffiti in Mahane Yehuda Market

Street art in Israel refers to different forms of visual art found on public walls, buildings, and other surfaces throughout the State of Israel. Israeli street art reflects the country's unique cultural, historical, and political landscape.

In addition to contemporary street art, Israel offers many examples of ancient graffiti. Inscriptions and drawings have been found in archaeological sites throughout the country that provide insight into the everyday lives of ancient civilizations.

Israeli street art has gained recognition both locally and internationally for its creativity, impact, and contribution to the urban art scene. There is also a substantial amount of street art made by Palestinians to criticize the Israeli occupation of the West Bank, most prominently on the Israeli West Bank barrier. Notable Israeli street artists include Dede, AMNESIA, Addam Yekutieli, Pilpeled, and Solomon Souza.

== Ancient graffiti ==
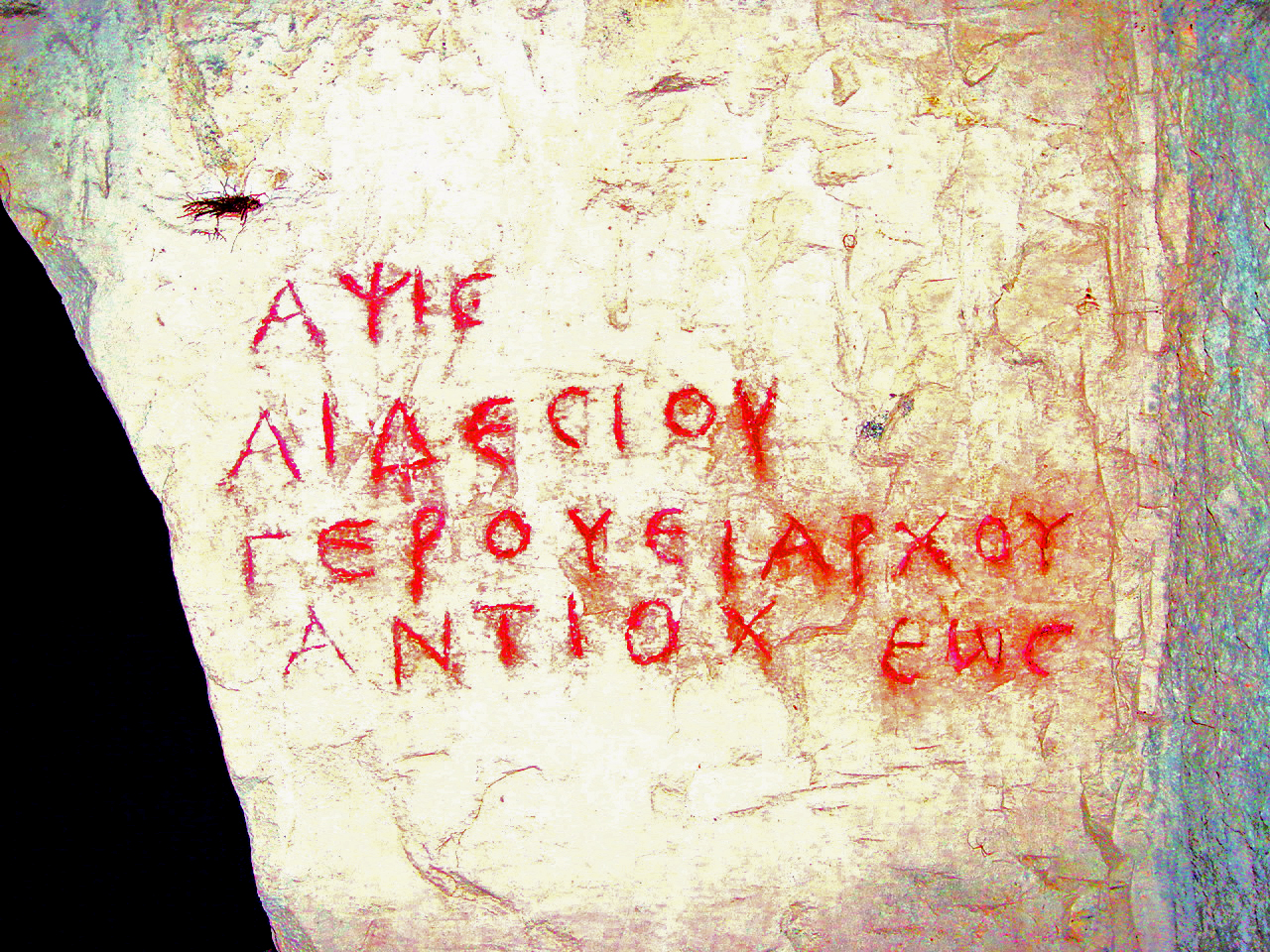
An inscription found in the Beit She'arim necropolis in Ancient Greek.

Ancient graffiti written by Jews in this area can be traced back to the 8th century BCE in places such as Beit She'arim, a Roman-era Jewish village. It has been found in many languages including Aramaic, Hebrew, Syriac, and Greek. This graffiti mostly consists of short phrases, ranging from blessings, such as "Good luck in your resurrection", to warnings, such as "You will come to an evil end if you rob this grave". While ancient graffiti was most commonly found near tombs, it also was used in everyday ancient life for various purposes, such as advertising a store, or marking rows of theater seats to claim ownership. Professor Karen B. Stern notes the difficulty in creating these markings, stating that “powders and fragments would cover one’s face and fill one’s lungs with dust; hardened dirt, rock, and plaster could push back and split fingernails; and carving implements, including metal nails, blades, and stones, surely drew blood when the lighting faded or surfaces grew unwieldy”.

== Street art after Rabin assassination ==
Israeli prime minister Yitzhak Rabin's assassination in 1995 by Yigal Amir, an ultranationalist law student at Bar-Ilan University, triggered a surge in graffiti near Tel Aviv City Hall, resulting in the creation of an improvised monument known as the Gal'Ed. Avigdor Klingman and Ronit Shalev argue that the graffiti produced at this time can be seen as a form of "ritual bereavement", and created a kind of collectivism that allowed individuals to develop an expressive ritual of fellowship which affirmed that one was not alone in grief, anger, shame, or sense of helplessness". A study of the graffiti near the assassination site in Tel Aviv was carried out, categorizing each piece of art. Set 1 was done immediately after the assassination, and set 2 around 10 months later.

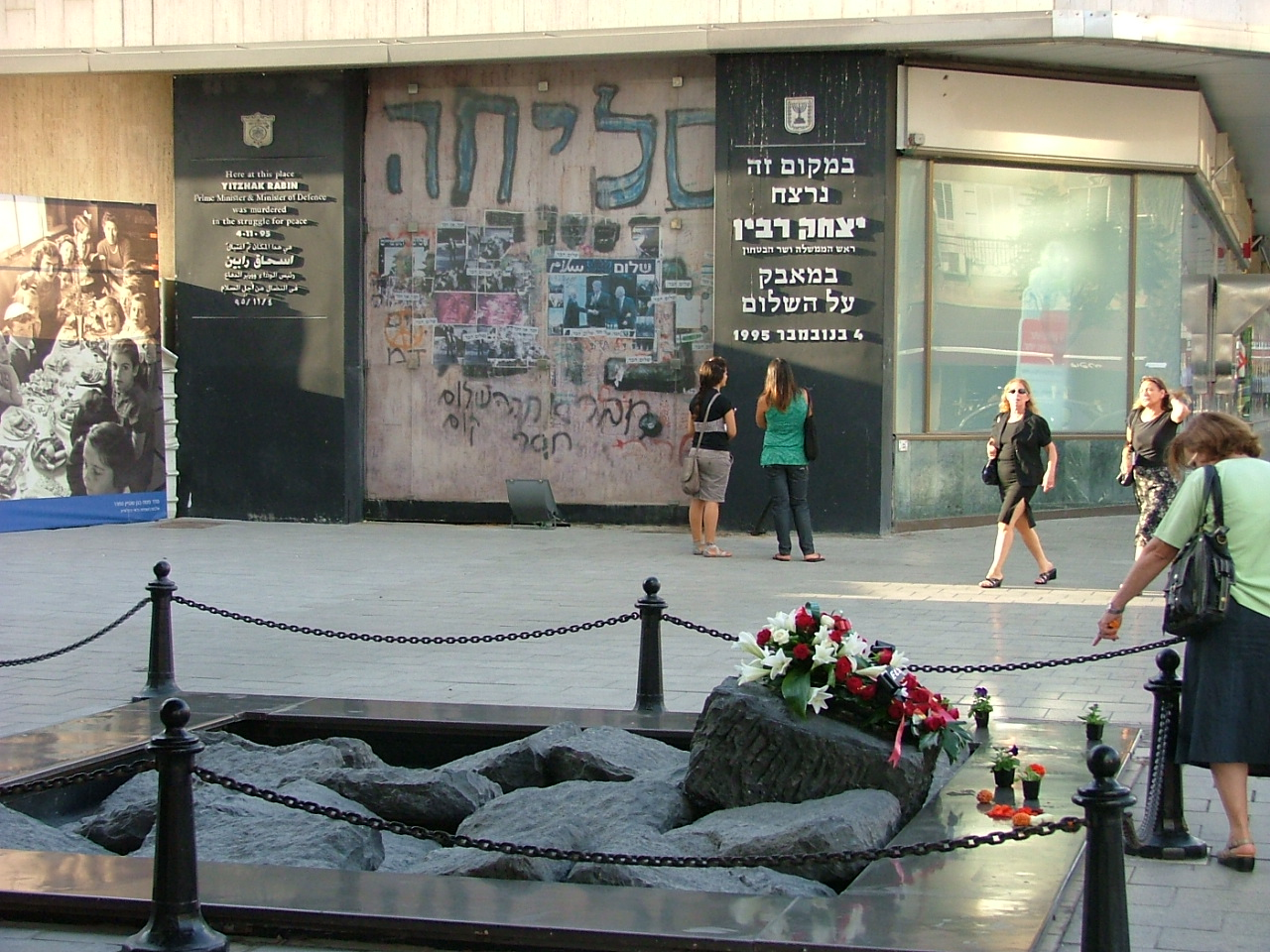
Graffiti on a wall, dating to 1995, shortly after Yitzhak Rabin's assassination; it reads "שלום חבר, אתה חסר" (Goodbye, friend, we miss you). These inscriptions have been preserved behind glass ever since by the Israeli government.

Content and Modality Frequencies of Graffiti in Rabin Square after Rabin's Assassination
	Frequency	
Content	Set 1	Set 2
Relating to loss of Rabin	125	163
Shock at murder act	80	90
Reference to future of peace process (as a missed opportunity)	52	52
Anger (in general)	42	42
National loss (of historical dimensions; fear for democracy and so forth)	22	38
Reference to violence (in general)	11	16
Hope for a better world	9	12
Political protest	8	8
Guilt feelings	8	8
Revenge (anger at the murderer)	4	4
Emotional writing modality	268	278
Intellectual writing modality	93	155
Metaphorical writing	128	131

The study noted how Rabin's past as a military leader was combined with his later desire for peace. For example, one piece of graffiti in the square reads "In memory of the peace leader. We will always be with you in fire and water—I salute you, General," while another says "you were our leader in time of war, a prophet in time of hope and the Messiah in time of peace—and our dream was murdered." The graffiti merges Rabin's contradictions and allows him to be portrayed as both a military leader and a man of peace."

63% of the signatures were female. Some graffiti was written in English. The most commonly drawn symbols were the Peace sign and the Star of David. Unlike many other instances of graffiti, this type of graffiti was seen as legitimate. Most remained intact for 15 months. When the government announced plans to erase the graffiti, the public protested and stopped the action.

== Street art post-October 7 ==
Following the October 7 attacks by Hamas and the start of the Gaza war, Israeli graffiti artists commemorated and memorialized the victims of the attacks, the hostages still held in Gaza, and those who had fought against Hamas or rescued people. It has also become an outlet to speak out against Hamas, and to criticize Prime Minister Benjamin Netanyahu's handling of the war.

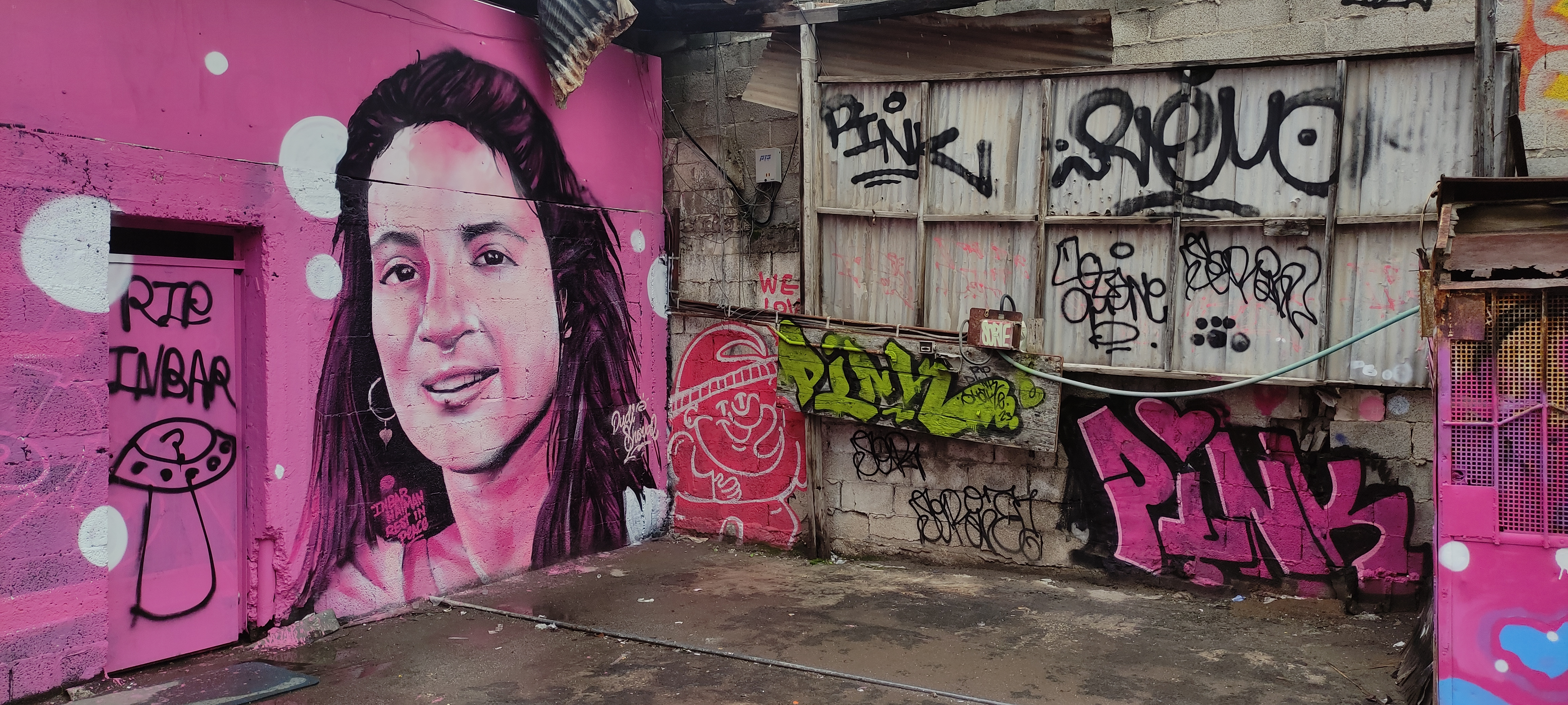
Memorial graffiti for Inbar Haiman, a graffiti artist known as "Pink", who was murdered in Gaza.

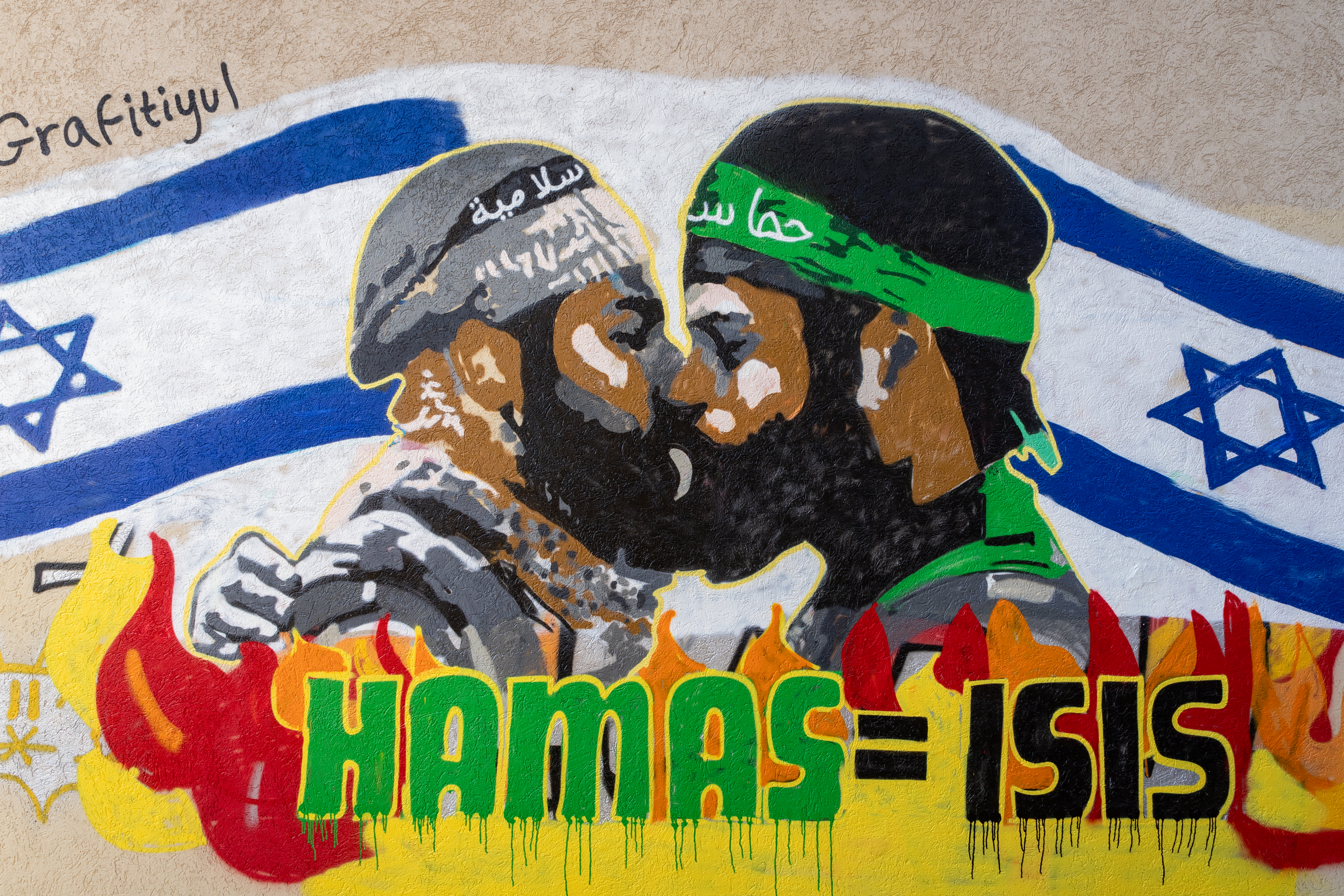
Graffiti equating Hamas and ISIS.

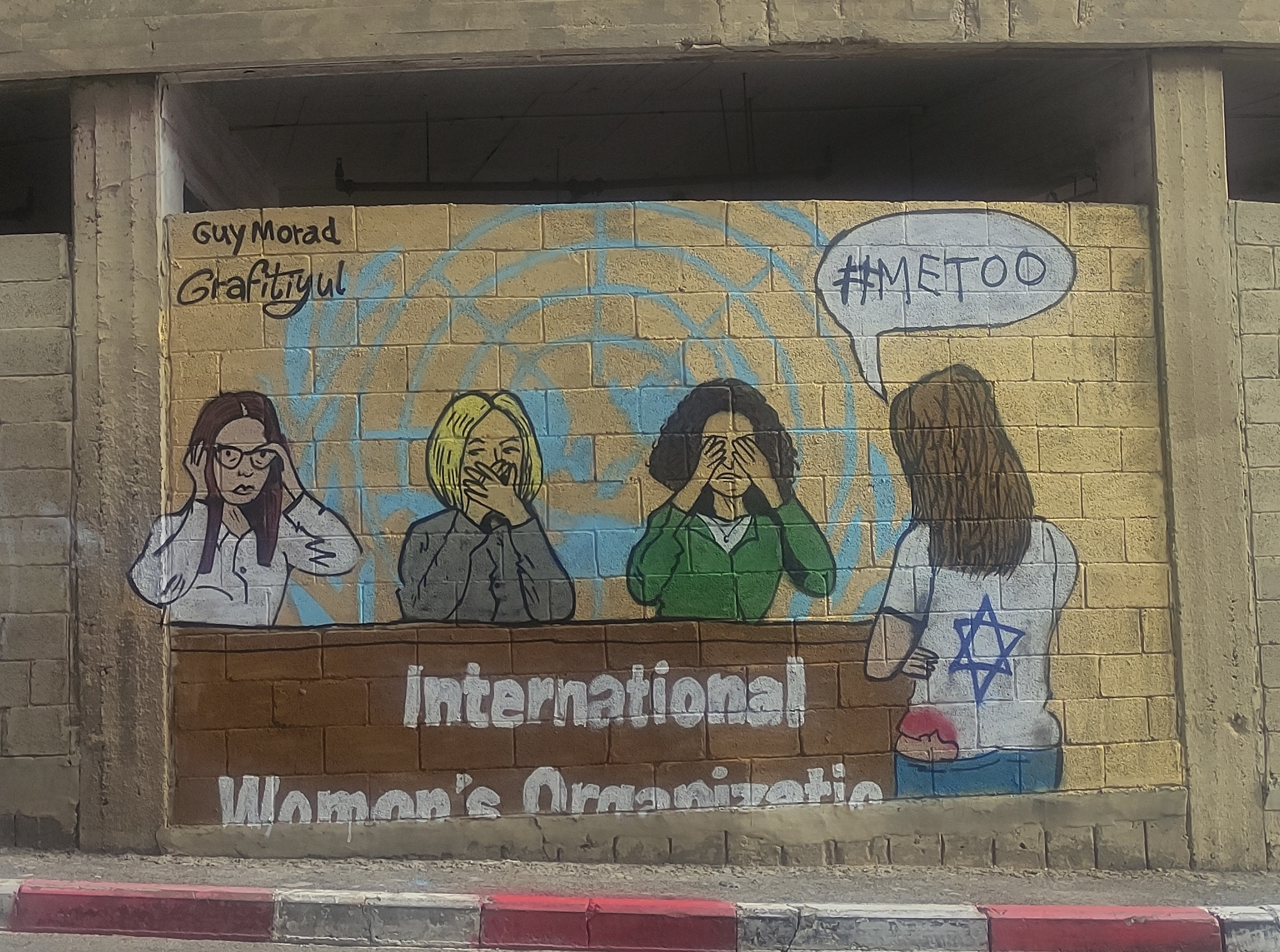
Graffiti in Tel Aviv protesting the global women's organizations inaction and ignoring of the evidence of sexual violence in the context of the 7 October attacks.

== Tel Aviv ==
=== Florentin ===
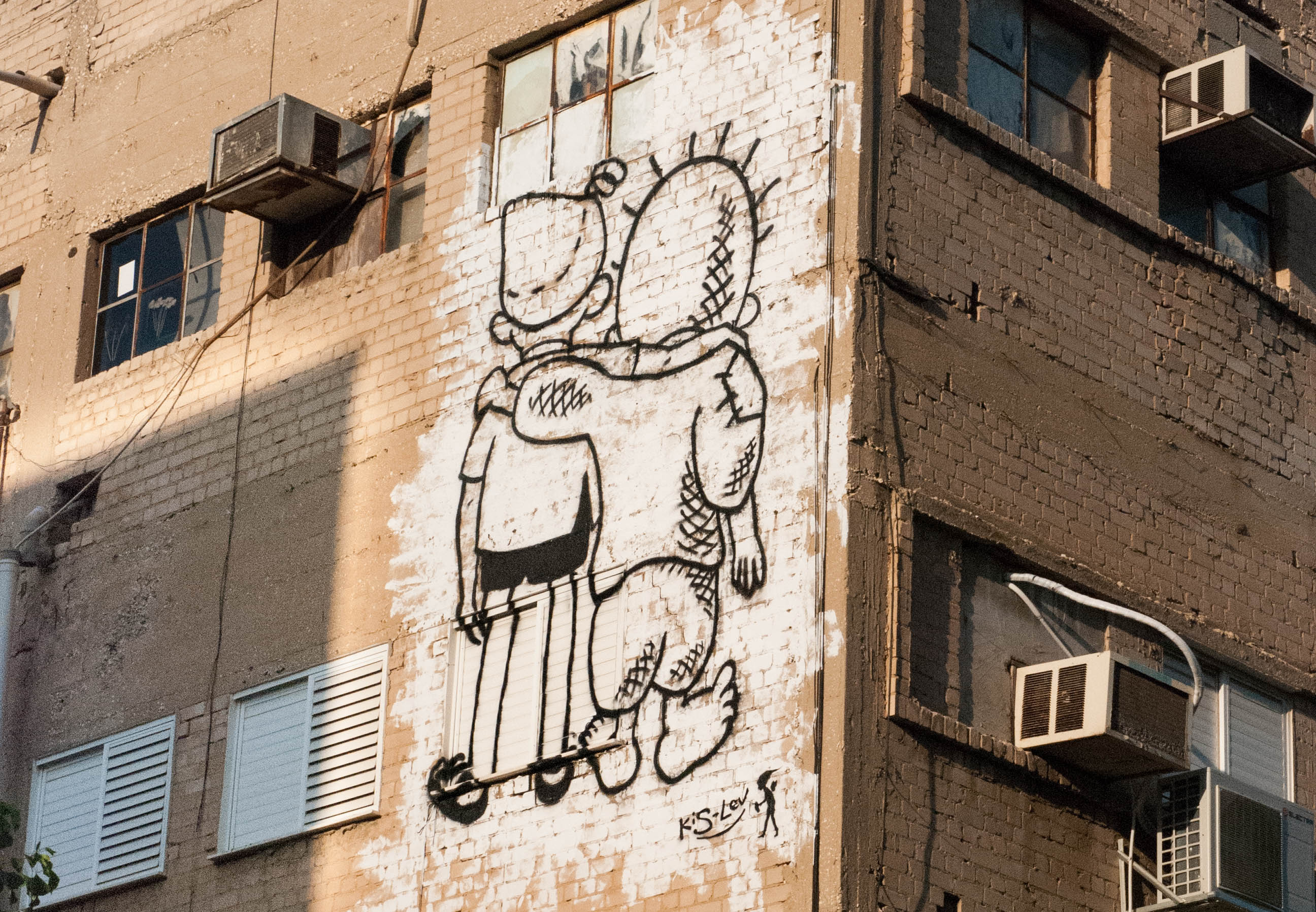
Graffiti as peace activism: The Peace Kids in Florentin depicting Israeli Srulik and Palestinian Handala embracing one another

Tel Aviv's Florentin neighborhood is known for its vibrant street art scene. Young people are attracted to this area due to the low rents. Florentin has long been the focus of urban renovation plans and many buildings have been marked for demolition. These abandoned buildings have become canvasses, leading to a flourishing graffiti culture. Researcher Caroline Rozenholc notes that the "dark reputation accumulated through years of poverty and lack of municipal concern is nowadays dissolving into a sense of 'authenticity.'”

As much of Florentin's population is low-income, even "smiles, when they appear, can be distorted and twisted, or bordering on lunacy." Graffiti in Florentin is often politically charged and created by rival political groups. In one instance, for example, the slogan "The infiltrators [African migrants and refugees] are a cancer" was changed to read "racism is cancer." Graffiti wars are quite common, with some being changed over and over.

=== Art tourism ===
Some say that the fast-paced gentrification of the neighborhood is causing the art on its streets to dwindle, and an outcry ensued when some of the street art was painted over by the municipality. On the other hand, locals are sometimes upset by the proliferation of private street art tours, showing their displeasure with graffiti displaying the message "FUCK UR TOURS." One resident observed that "The tours may be keeping this area alive, but the large amount of dense graffiti creates a sort of layer of makeup on an area that is actually dead. Something about the tours causes me, as a resident, to feel like an animal in the zoo". In response, veteran graffiti artists have stopped working in the neighborhood, favoring less touristy spots in the center of the city.

== Jerusalem ==
Street art in Jerusalem is different than it is in other parts of the country. There have been multiple deliberate projects designed to bolster the presence of graffiti in the capital, mainly by the director of the Jerusalem Center Development Company, a branch of the Jerusalem Development Authority. To be legal, before implementation the designs are subject to approval by both the local authorities and the adjacent residents and business owners who may be impacted by the artwork. Moreover, there are official guidelines in place that prohibit any depictions of political ideologies, violent content, or other unsuitable imagery.

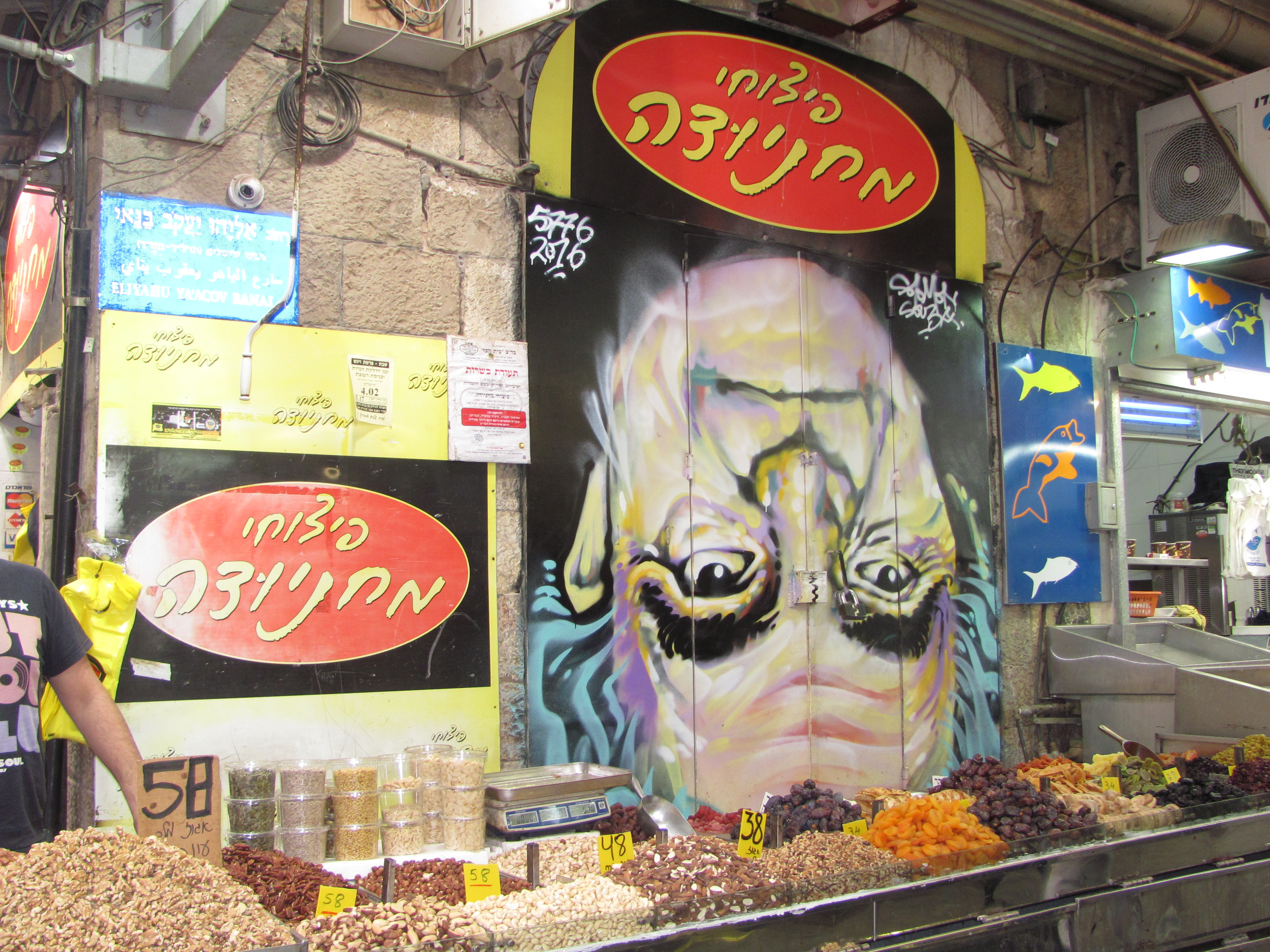
Upside-down portrait of David Ben-Gurion at the Mahane Yehuda Market

=== Mahane Yehuda ===
Spearheaded by Solomon Souza (grandson of artist F. N. Souza), the Mahane Yehuda Market has turned into one of the most impressive spots in Jerusalem for street art. Souza has spray-painted over 250 works on the shuttered stalls in the market, depicting well-known contemporary and historical figures. During the week, when the market is open, most of the art is not visible. However, on Shabbat, the market is generally closed and any passersby can admire the work. Notable figures depicted are:

- Hannah Szenes—Jewish World War II hero
- Abraham Joshua Heschel—American rabbi and civil rights activist
- Gracia Mendes Nasi—Sephardi woman who helped Jews flee the Inquisition
- Mahatma Gandhi—Indian nationalist leader and nonviolence advocate
- Steven Spielberg—Jewish-American filmmaker
- David Ben-Gurion—first prime minister of Israel
- Moses—prophet and leader of the Jewish People
- Rabbi Ovadia Yosef—Sephardi chief rabbi of Israel and spiritual leader
- Ada Yonath—Israeli Scientist
- Jonathan Pollard—Israeli-US spy who sold US state secrets
- Sophie Scholl—German anti-Nazi resistance fighter
- Sheikh Farid al-Jabari—a senior clan leader in Hebron
- Golda Meir—first female prime minister of Israel

So far, Souza has completed these murals without any help from the city or third parties, although he is open to working with the municipality or foundations in the future. Souza has said that it has been easy to get permission from the shop owners to paint their shutters, with some even requesting a favorite rabbi or the family patriarch.

=== Tabula Rasa ===
Akin to Florentin, the historic Beit Ya'akov neighborhood became run-down in recent years. That is why, according to Hila Smolyanski, director of the visual arts department at the Jerusalem Municipality, this neighborhood was selected by the city to undergo a cultural project. The project, named Tabula rasa (meaning blank slate), was done by 30 artists to create murals and other street art on poles, walls, balconies, shops and doors to revitalize the area. Some of the artists are well-known and have frequented galeries, other are more notorious local graffiti artists. Then Jerusalem Mayor Nir Barkat explained that the project is “a joint venture between the merchants, the Student Union and the municipality.”

== Street art in the West Bank ==
The Israeli West Bank barrier has become known for its political graffiti. It first began to garner international attention in 2005, after the anonymous British graffiti artist Banksy visited and left nine works on the barrier. This inspired other acclaimed international street artists to paint on the wall, such as Blu, Paul Insect and Sam3. These efforts, and subsequent exposure in the media, resulted in almost one million dollars being raised for Palestinian charities. The art on this barrier is often referred to as a form of Sumud, what literary scholar Tahrir Hamdi calls "creative resistance."

Local Palestinian artists also have a large presence on the wall, whether that is creating their own art or "Palestinizing" the wall art made by others. For example, as a local youth explained, "Someone bricked up the window Banksy painted on the wall. Maybe they didn't like his work, or the idea of a beautiful landscape. For me, the issue is not about rejecting the view but whether it's the right time to imagine it".

The Israeli government often has tried to censor Palestinians from using graffiti and street art as a form of resistance or communication. During the First Intifada, graffiti “became a way to organize protests, strikes, and rallies; to affirm allegiances; to warn against collaboration; and finally, to demarcate political boundaries.” To stop this, Israeli forces imposed fines, threatened imprisonment, and collaborated with local Palestinians to remove the works they found the most troubling, such as those with heavy references to the Nakba.

Some Palestinian critics view these pieces of art as further eroding their sovereignty over their space. Others accuse artists of beautifying the wall and creating artistic tourism that actually helps legitimate its presence. There are also concerns that such murals do not actually challenge Israeli authority.

Recently, with the rise of the so-called "electronic Intifada", graffiti has taken a step back in terms of prominence for Palestinian resistance. There even was an website with a virtual separation barrier, where users could "tag" or "bomb" it with protest art.

== Penalties ==
The penalty for illegal street art in Israel can be a fine or up to a year in prison. In April 2023, a Bnei Brak resident was arrested for graffitiing “Rabin is a terrorist, war criminal” on a Rabin memorial in Tel Aviv.

== See also ==
- Culture of Israel
- Art in Tel Aviv
