= Nisim Aloni =

Israeli playwright and translator

Nissim Aloni
- נסים אלוני
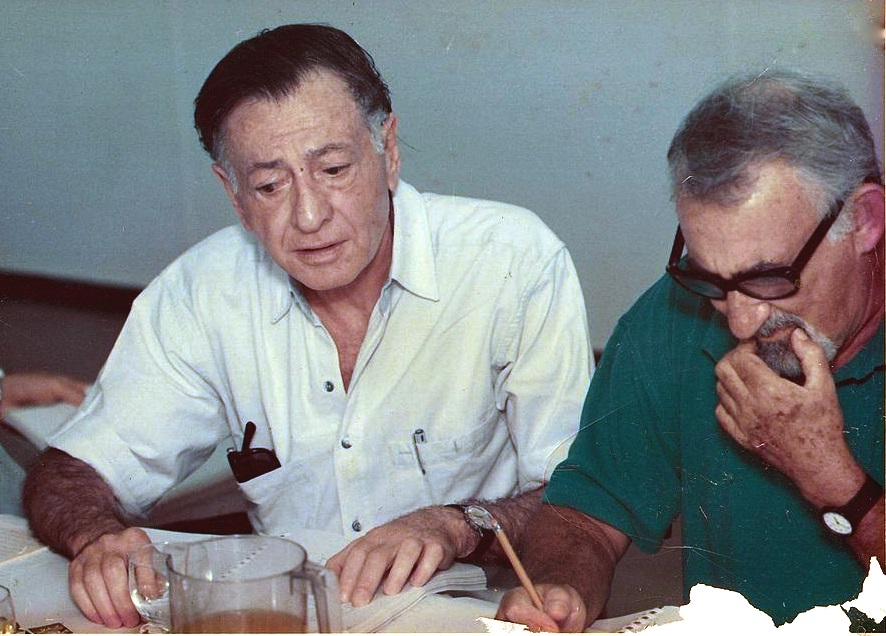
- Born: 24 August 1926; Florentin, South Tel Aviv, Mandate Palestine
- Died: 13 June 1998 (aged 71); Tel Aviv, Israel
- Citizenship: Israeli
- Education: The Hebrew University of Jerusalem
- Occupations: Playwright and translator
- Spouse: Elana Eden (m. 1962; div. 1965)
- Awards: 1983 Bialik Prize; 1996 Israel Prize

Nissim Aloni (Hebrew: נסים אלוני; August 24, 1926 - 13 June 1988), was an Israeli playwright, theater director, author, journalist, screenwriter, translator, and lyricist. He was a recipient of the Israel Prize in 1996 and is considered one of Israel's most prominent and important playwrights.

== Biography ==
Aloni was born by the name Nissim Levi to poor Bulgarian Jewish immigrant parents in Mandate Palestine. His family lived in Florentin, a low-income neighborhood in south Tel Aviv, which later became a source of inspiration for his work.

After graduating from high school, Aloni enlisted in the Notrut, a Jewish militia operating as an auxiliary police force alongside the British. He wrote for the weekly BaMahane, and fought in the 1948 Arab-Israeli War, serving in the Givati Brigade of the Israel Defense Forces. Following his military service, he was appointed to the editorial board of the periodical B'Ayin and served as literary editor of Ashmoret. He studied history and French at The Hebrew University of Jerusalem.

In 1957, he traveled to Paris and stayed there a year and a half. In Paris, he became familair with contemporary French theater and was particularly influenced by the theater of Bertolt Brecht, who was visiting Paris at the time. During that period, he was also introduced to the existentialist worldview and was especially impressed by the philosophy of Albert Camus.

In his later years, a stroke left him severely handicapped. He died on 13 June, 1998 at a hospital in Tel Aviv.

== Literary career ==
In 1953, his first play, Most Cruel the King, was produced at the national Habima Theater, creating a stir amongst theatre goers. The play focuses on the figure of Jeroboam. In 1961, Habima produced his play "The King's Clothes", which established him as one of the country's leading playwrights. In 1963, Aloni teamed up with Yossi Banai and Avner Hezkyahu to create the "Seasons Theater", for which Aloni wrote and produced the play The American Princess. From that point onward, Aloni produced all his plays. He also began writing skits for the comedy troupe Hagashash Hachiver, and produced some of their programs, such as Cinema Gashash and Cantata for Shawarma.

Aloni’s plays are characterized by abundance, which often turns into an overload of materials and artistic devices. In his plays, Aloni brings together various materials and techniques that are frequently foreign or even contradictory to one another. Nevertheless, in each play, there is a gravitational force that binds together the different components of the play—or at least some of them. The strength of this force is not consistent and varies from play to play. When the gravitational force is strong, as in The King’s Clothes and The Butterfly Hunter and Aunt Lisa, it is possible—though not always easy—to connect a significant portion of the play’s elements. When this force is weak, as in A Scapegoat, it is difficult to link the various elements and derive clear meaning from them.

Thematically, Aloni’s plays can be divided into two groups: plays centered on a social or ideological theme, and plays centered on a metaphysical theme. The first group includes Eddie King, The American Princess, Aunt Lisa, and One of Napoleon’s Adventures – Alive or Dead!. In these plays, two motifs emerge and merge. The first is the struggle and rebellion of a young man against the circumstances of his life. This is joined by a motif centered on an Oedipal struggle between a son and his father.

In all of Aloni’s plays, his virtuoso use of language stands out in its uniqueness. One of the hallmarks of Aloni’s style is his use of language that is unbound by norms, registers, levels, or linguistic standards. Aloni blends different idioms and linguistic layers, combining high and low language, standard with non-standard speech, and interweaving a rich variety of foreign languages into Hebrew. He orchestrates the elements of language and turns them into a kind of concert, one that invites the listener to attune to its rhythms, its musical progression, its flexibility, diversity, and the abundance of rhetorical, rhythmic, and metaphorical devices it contains. Aloni shatters all conventional dramatic unities—including the unity of genre—and in their place he establishes the unity of language and style.

Many of his plays involve royalty, such as The King's Clothes, The American Princess, The Bride and the Hunter of Butterflies (adapted for television by Ram Loevy), Edi King. His other plays include The Gypsies of Jaffa, The Revolution and the Chicken, Lukas the Coward, The Raucous Dying, Napoleon Dead or Alive.

Another theatrical field in which Aloni was active was writing and directing for light entertainment. Notably, he wrote and directed two shows for the comedy trio HaGashash HaHiver: Cinema Gashash (1967) and Cantata for Shawarma (1969). These shows were enormously successful, and several of the sketches and expressions he wrote for them became cult classics and cultural touchstones in Israeli society.

Aloni held actress Hanna Rovina in high esteem, and wrote a play, Aunt Liza, specifically for her to act the lead part.

He has also published a collection of prose, Notes of a Stray Cat.

== Awards and critical acclaim ==
- In 1983, Aloni was a co-recipient (jointly with Ozer Rabin) of the Bialik Prize for literature.
- In 1992, he became honorary fellow of The Sam Spiegel Film and Television School, Jerusalem.
- In 1996, he was awarded the Israel Prize for stage arts – dramatics.

== Works outside of Israel ==
"The American Princess" was translated from Hebrew to Swedish by Viveka Heiman and then from Swedish to Norwegian by Jens Bjorneboe. It was produced by Oslo city theater Den Nye Theater, directed by Izzy Abrahami. Abrahami convinced the Israeli consul in Oslo to invite Aloni to the premier. Aloni, who reportedly sat next to the Norwegian king, brought Abrahami an original painting by Yosl Bergner as thanks.

== Commemoration ==
In November 2009, a street was named for him in Tel Aviv.

== Published works ==
=== Plays ===
- Nesikhah ha-Ameriḳaʾit (Tel Aviv, 1963) translated as "The American princess" by Richard Flantz (ISBN 965-255-011-6)
- Akhzar mi-kol ha-melekh (Cruel from all King) (Tel Aviv, 1968)
- Edi King, a play in two acts (Tel Aviv, 1975)
- Ha-Kalah ṿe-tsayad ha-parparim (The Bride and the Butterfly Hunter) (Tel Aviv, 1980)
- Napolyon, ḥai o met! (Napoleon Alive or Dead) (Tel Aviv, 1993)
- Dodah Lizah (Aunt Liza) (Tel Aviv, 2000)
- Ha-Tsoʻanim shel Yafo (The Gypsies of Jaffa) (Tel Aviv, 2000)
- Bigde ha-melekh (The Emperor's Clothes) (Tel Aviv, 2004)

=== Literature ===
- Reshimot shel ḥatul reḥov (Lists of Feral Cat) (Tel Aviv, 1996)

== See also ==
- List of Israel Prize recipients
- List of Bialik Prize recipients
