= Onili =

Israeli singer-songwriter

Nili Ohayon (Hebrew: נילי אוחיון), better known by her stage name Onili, is an Israeli singer-songwriter, performer and music producer.

Born in Israel, she was raised in Paris. There, she began her career as Nili in "Story about the clown", her first band. She collaborated with local artists in various genres as a singer and a writer, including the single "Starlight" by The Supermen Lovers.

In 2004, she moved to Haifa. There, she created Onili, her new solo project. She worked on all aspects of her product; music, production, marketing and branding. As well, she collaborated with Israeli artists and musicians such as Barak Kram, Jonathan Levy (bassist & Producer), Sabbo & Kuti Kutiman, Borgore, Pilpeled and Dreck & Broken Fingaz.

In 2008, she moved to Tel Aviv, and released her first album 'be somebunny'. Her videos and songs started to reach an international crowd, so she and Barak started touring Europe and the USA.

Between 2004 and 2010, Onili released independently 2 albums, and licensed songs to films, ads and TV shows. In Europe, she collaborated with the French clothing brand Cotelac, releasing "First Kiss" and collaborating on a few fashion items, distributed in Cotelac's stores around the world. The graphic design and illustrations of "First Kiss" were done by Pilpeled.

in late 2012, Onili moved to Boston, where she collaborates with Lipsync, a music sync company based in LA. Her songs were placed in multiple TV shows ( such as tiny wolf, degrassi, and more..) as well as in a JCPenney TV ad and films.

She is now working on a new project.

== Discography ==
- "First Kiss" (2008) destined to be released spring-summer 2008
- "Story about the Clown" (2001). Pop-rock, released by "Night & Day" (France) Vinyl/singles/ep:
- (2008) GAMES EP first single out of "first Kiss"+3 remixes.
- (2007) "Sentimental" Non-official release by Seattle's KEXP radio station and digitally available for downloading through the stations' website.
- (2004) "Paris 2045" with Rove Dogs (electro rap)
- (2002) "Six times" w/ Silicon Boogie (electro rap)
- (2000) "Up there" w/ Silicon Boogie Collaborations/Compilations
- (2007) "Betty Ford" compilation especially compiled for the Tel-Aviv based bar. To be released next month and includes "Omizu" (an Onili track)
- (2006) "Braad Sessions" – a compilation especially compiled for well-known hair salon. Includes 2 tracks by Onili, "Used to be the one" and "Salat
- (2006) Collaboration with HameSiah on two tracks: "Ohev Otah" and "Hamahir"
- (2006) collaboration with rapper Sagol 59 on 1 track, "Seret"
- (2006) "Who" Remix for Izabo & The Fools of Prophecy
- (2005) w/ Polar Pair on "Butt your body"
- (2005) w/ La Phase on "Colors" (electro hip hop)
- (2005) w/ U (French pop star) on "Si Je Savais"
- (2004) Paris 2045 with Rove Dogs (electro rap)
- (2003) No title for the future S.A The Clown, feat IMO
- (2002) w/ Silicon Boogie (electro rap)
- (2001) Additional vocals on Mega-Hit "Starlight" with The Supermen Lovers. (house-dance) reached No. 1 chart position in Europe
- (2001) "My time is short" w/ Red Room (trip hop)
- (2000) "Up there" w/ Silicon Boogie
