= Elana Eden =

Israeli actress (born 1940)

- אילנה עדן
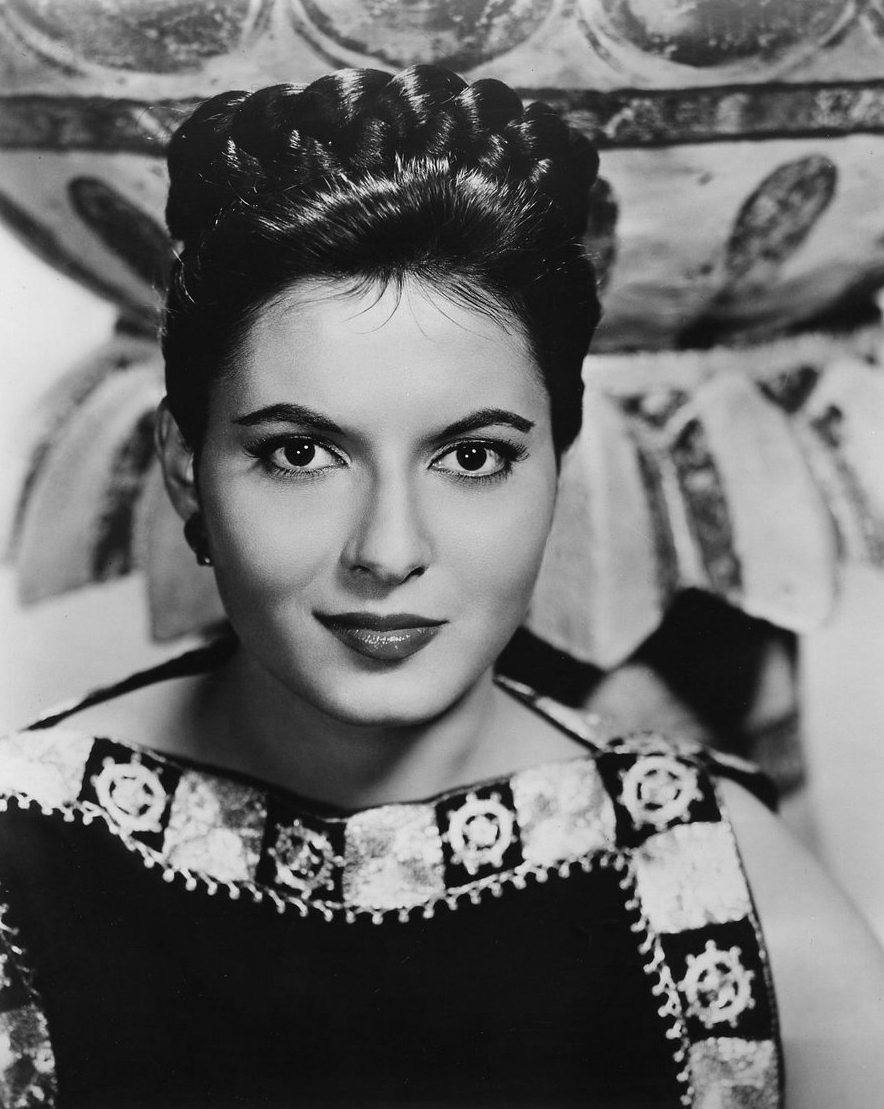
- Publicity photo, 1960
- Born: 1 May 1940 (age 86); Tel Aviv, Mandatory Palestine
- Other names: Elana Kuper; Ilana Lani Cooper; Ilana Myrow
- Occupation: Actress
- Years active: 1957–1968
- Notable work: The Story of Ruth (1960)
- Spouses: Nissim Aloni (m. 1962; div. 1965) Fred Myrow (m. 1969; died 1999)

Elana Eden (Hebrew: אילנה עדן, born Elana Lani Cooper; 1 May 1940) is an Israeli actress of film, television, and stage, best known for her film debut as the title role in 20th Century Fox's biblical epic The Story of Ruth (1960).

== Early life ==
Eden was born in Bat Yam, Tel Aviv District, of the then British Mandate of Palestine (1917–1948), and future State of Israel. Her father, Zvi Cooper, was a Polish-born landscape gardener who had emigrated from Europe and had settled in the Holy Land, in a recently organized farming community in what was then British-occupied Palestine. Her mother (born c. 1910) was born in the Russian Empire. She has two older siblings: a brother Moti and a sister Tamar. Eden grew up speaking the new modern revived language of Hebrew and being exposed to her parents' native languages of Polish, Russian and Yiddish. She later learned English at school, and attended high school at a kibbutz in the central western coastal Sharon plain. She worked as a writer for the prominent Israeli national newspaper Haaretz, published in the then capital city of Tel Aviv.

Eden decided to become an actress after seeing a performance of George Bernard Shaw's play Pygmalion when she was 15 years old. She won a scholarship to study acting at Israel's Habima Theatre Drama School in Tel Aviv, and made her stage debut in the play Lysistrata, which toured as she performed over 50 times in various locations in Israel in the late 1950s.

== Career ==
After having served as a machine gunner and volunteer with the Israeli Army ground forces (of the combined Israeli Defence Force), Eden auditioned for the film The Diary of Anne Frank in London in 1957, and she was one of the five finalists for the part until Millie Perkins was cast.

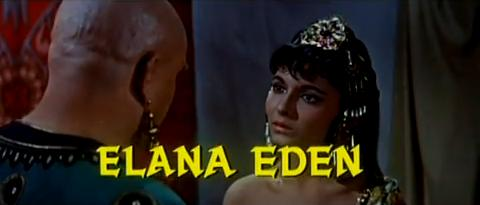
Elana Eden with co-star Thayer David, photographed in the theatrical trailer for the Biblical historical feature film The Story of Ruth (1960), from the 20th Century Fox studios.

When searching for an actress to play the title role in 20th Century Fox's CinemaScope Biblical feature film The Story of Ruth (1960), producer Samuel G. Engel remembered her previous screen test three years earlier for The Diary of Anne Frank, and invited Eden to Hollywood in August 1959 to do more tests for the part of the character Ruth. The film producers changed her stage name from "Elana Cooper" to "Elana Eden", because "Cooper did not sound Jewish enough." For appearing in the film, she lost 10 pounds in three weeks, giving up "bread and butter, sour cream, rich sauces and cakes" for "steak, cottage cheese and fresh fruit." Of her portrayal, Variety trade magazine wrote: "She gives a performance of dignity, projecting an inner strength through a delicate veneer." Daniel A. Poling, editor of the religious news and features magazine Christian Herald, thought that Eden's portrayal of Ruth was "worthy of an Academy Award." Her performance was also complimented by then famous Hollywood gossip and film / celebrity news columnist Hedda Hopper.

After her 1960 appearance in The Story of Ruth, Eden appeared in several television series in both the United States and her home country of Israel, keeping busy especially in the following year with two on the small screen after the release of her starring role. In February 1961, she played Shasme Hasmar in the Hawaiian setting detective series Adventures in Paradise episode "Who Is Sylvia?" She also played a young Czech woman named Anna, in the series starring noted film actress Barbara Stanwyck in The Barbara Stanwyck Show in the episode "The Hitch-Hiker." She also appeared later that decade in Trunk to Cairo, an adventure film starring World War II hero turned acting star Audie Murphy, along with George Sanders and Marianne Koch, and two years later in "The Revolutionary," a 1968 episode of The Name of the Game.

== Personal life ==
Eden married Israeli author and playwright Nissim Aloni in 1962, they divorced in 1965. She later married American composer Fredric "Fred" Myrow on 6 June 1969. They had three daughters: Rachael, Shira, and Neora.

Eden was a speaker at the "kickoff" dinner for the 1967 United Jewish Appeal campaign and the Modesto Jewish Welfare in Modesto, California.

== Filmography ==
Year	Title	Role	Notes
1960	The Story of Ruth	Ruth	Film debut
1966	Trunk to Cairo	Hadassa	Israeli-West German co-production

== Television ==
Year	Title	Role	Notes
1960	This Is Your Life	Herself	Episode: Mervin LeRoy
1961	Adventures in Paradise	Shasme Hasmar	Episode: Who Is Sylvia?
1961	The Barbara Stanwyck Show	Anna	Episode: The Hitch-Hiker
1968	The Name of the Game		Episode: The Revolutionary

== Plays ==
- Lysistrata
- Tuvia Ha'Choleh
- The Diary of Anne Frank
