= Trunk to Cairo =

- Original film poster
- Directed by: Menahem Golan
- Written by: Marc Behm; Alexander Ramati; Artur Brauner
- Produced by: Menahem Golan; Michael J. Kagan
- Starring: Audie Murphy; George Sanders; Marianne Koch
- Cinematography: Mimish Herbst
- Edited by: Danny Shik
- Music by: Dov Seltzer
- Production companies: CCC Film; Noah Films
- Distributed by: Constantin Film; American International Pictures (US); United Artists (UK)
- Release dates: 1965 (Israel): 28 December 1966
- Running time: 103 minutes
- Countries: Israel; West Germany
- Language: English

Trunk to Cairo (German: Einer spielt falsch) is a 1965 Israeli-West German international co-production spy film directed by Menahem Golan and starring Audie Murphy and George Sanders. It was distributed by American International Pictures. It was Murphy's first non-western or war film since The Quiet American in 1958.

== Plot ==
Mike Merrick (Audie Murphy) is an American agent who is sent to meet with Professor Schlieben (George Sanders) a German scientist. During the mission it is revealed that the professor is developing a weaponized rocket that can be used against the Western world. Merrick now must destroy the rocket plans hidden in Schlieben's lab. Things are further complicated when Radical Muslims insist on destroying the rocket themselves and killing Merrick. After kidnapping Schlieben's daughter he must now escape Middle Eastern intelligence agencies against impossible odds.

== Cast ==
- Audie Murphy as Mike Merrick
- George Sanders as Professor Schlieben
- Marianne Koch as Helga Schlieben
- Hans von Borsody as Hans Klugg
- Joseph Yadin as Captain Gabar
- Gila Almagor as Yasmin
- Eytan Priver as Jamil
- Bomba Zur as Ali
- Zeev Berlinsky as Benz
- Shlomo Vishinsky as Jacob
- Tikva Mor as Christina
- Elana Eden as Hadassa
- Mona Silberstein as Hostess
- Yoel Noyman as Egyptian Colonel
- Anna Schell as Belly Dancer
- Suzanna Ratoni Fräulein Bruckner
- Menashe Glazier as Mahmud

== Production ==
It was shot at the Spandau Studios in Berlin and on location in Rome and Israel from June to July 1965. The film's title was inspired by the 1964 discovery at Rome Airport of a bound and drugged man inside a trunk sent from the Egyptian Embassy at Rome to Cairo, marked "diplomatic mail."

== Soundtrack ==
The film score was by Dov Seltzer and featured a song "Dangerous Woman" written by Jean Raskin and sung by Ouela Gill.

== See also ==
- Operation Damocles (German rocket scientists in Egypt)
