= Pilpeled =

Israeli contemporary artist, graphic designer and illustrator

- Born: Nir Peled; May 1, 1985 (age 41); Herzliya, Israel
- Known for: Public art, Stenciling
- Website: pilpeled.com

Logo
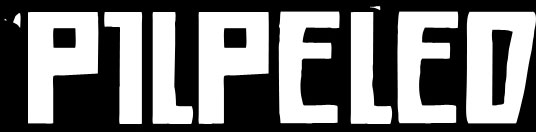

Nir Peled, (Hebrew: ניר פלד; born in 1985), known as Pilpeled, is an Israeli contemporary artist, street artist, graphic designer and illustrator, and founder of Pilpeled clothing and accessories brand.

== Art career ==
Pilpeled started his career in 2005 in Tel Aviv, creating posters for parties and clubs, party flyers and album covers. During these years he made posters for several artists such as DJ Shadow, Kutmah and craze, and album covers for Rami Fortis, Boom Pam, Soulico, Cohen@Mushon, and Onili.

Pilpeled worked on the interior design of the "Brown Hotel" boutique hotel in Tel Aviv and restaurants and clubs in Tel Aviv: Bodega bar, Zinger, Bobamaara, and Stereotype. In 2007 he worked for MTV-Israel as chief designer. In 2011 he took part in a group exhibition in the modern art festival "Art Beijing" in China. In 2013 he designs a limited edition bottle of Absolut vodka X PILPELED. In 2014 he made a collaboration with Puma, designing limited-edition jackets.

In 2015 he took part in a group exhibition in Inoperable Vienna. In 2015 he collaborated with Coca-Cola making the Coca-Cola zero campaign that includes several hands made paintings on billboards. In 2016 he collaborates with lifestyle French bread Bensimon and created a shoe collection with Pilpeled designs. In 2018 he took part in a group exhibition in the Israel Museum. In 2018 he won the best graffiti from Time Out magazine. In 2018 he took part in a group exhibition at the Mairie du 4eme Paris. In 2019 he collaborates New Era Cap Company and created a New Era caps designed by Pilpeled. In 2019 he made artwork for the Urban Nation museum in Berlin.

In 2020 he made a Solo exhibition at BlackFlagArt Galery in Istanbul Turkey; and Mural in Kadıköy, Istanbul. In 2020 he took a part in a group exhibition at Zemack Gallery.

Pilpeled is known for his monochromatic style and his work can be found on murals around the world, galleries, and museums.

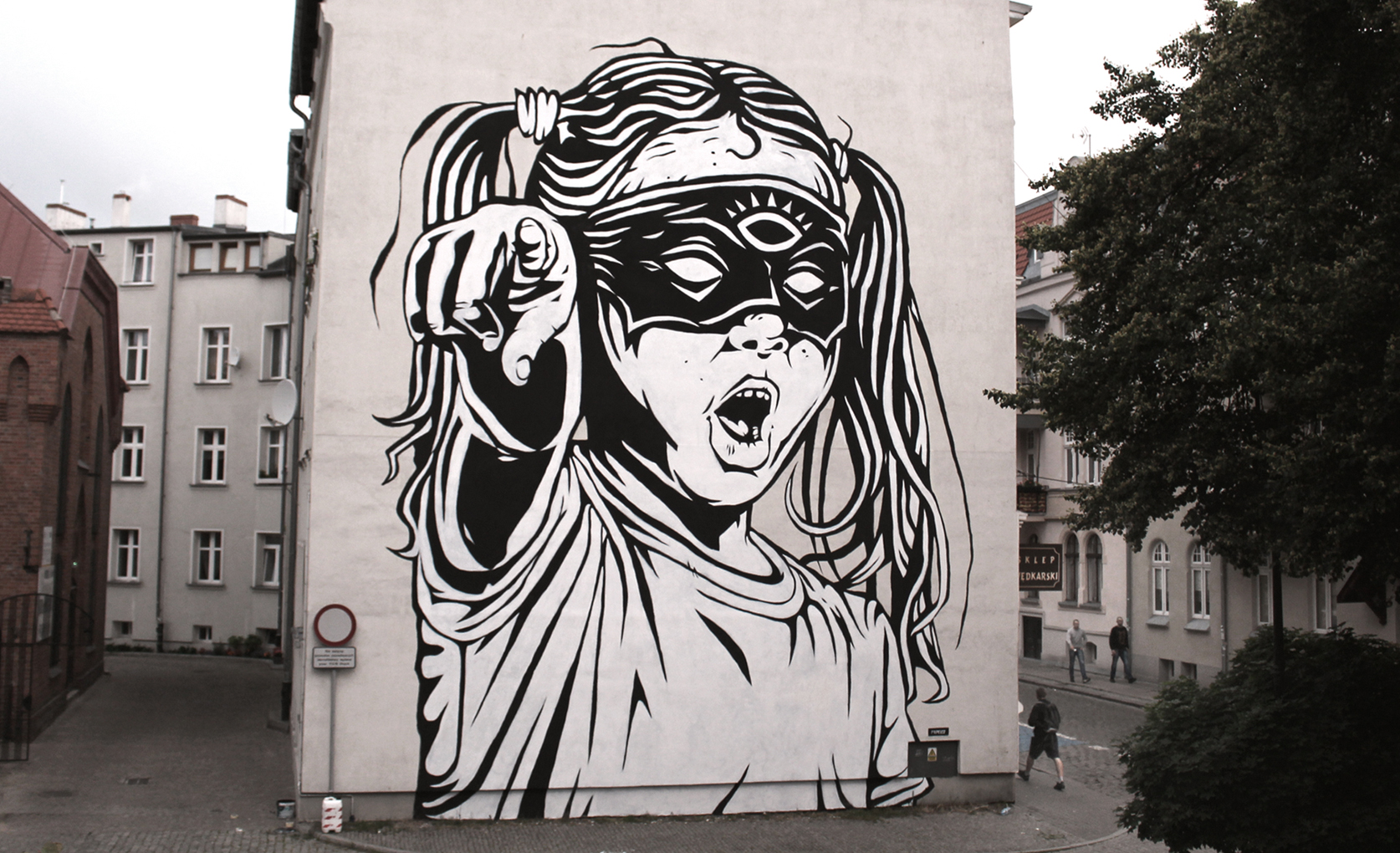

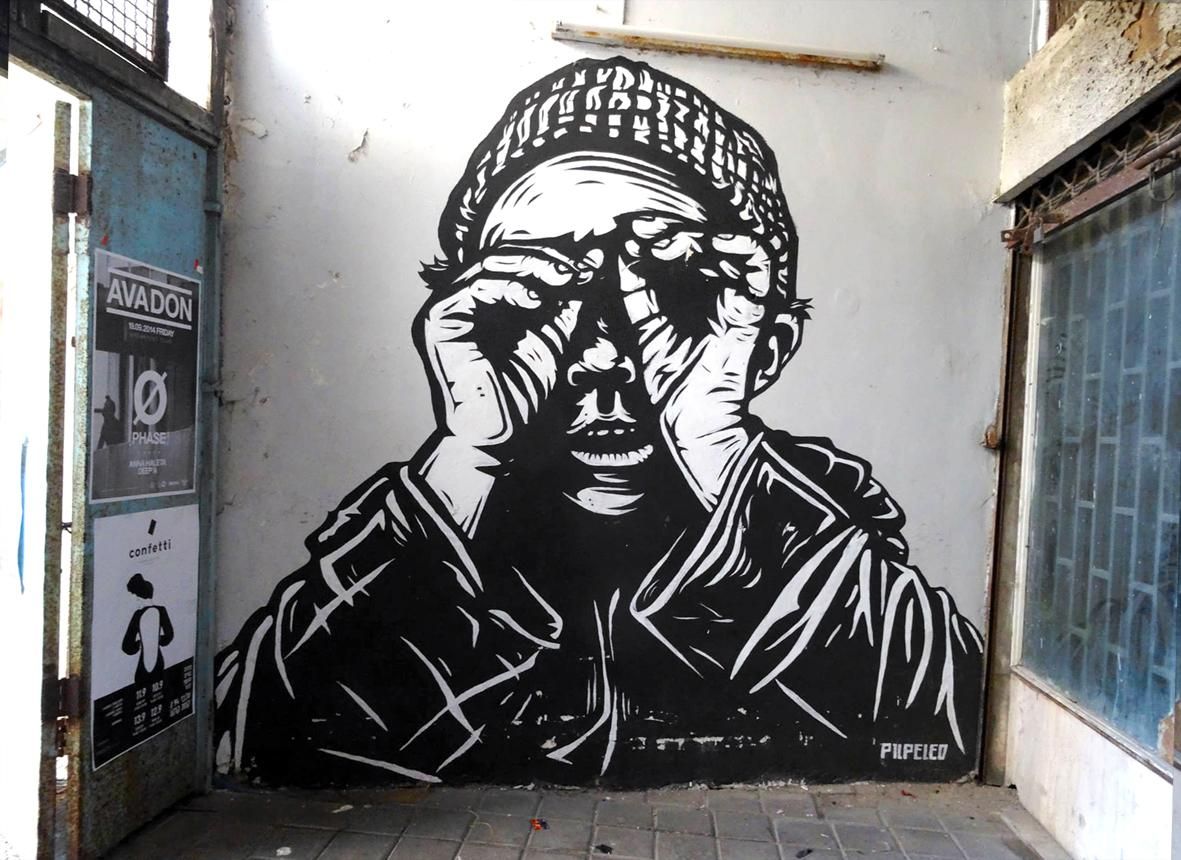

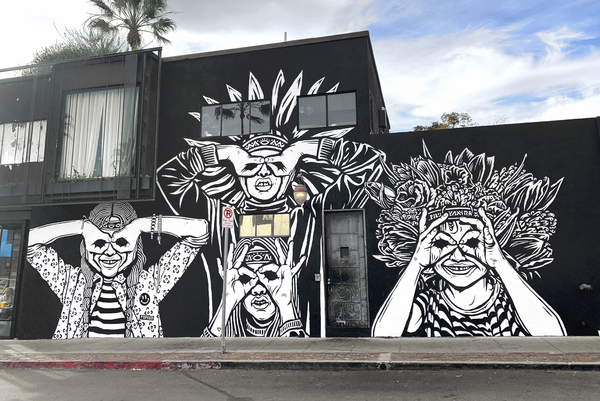

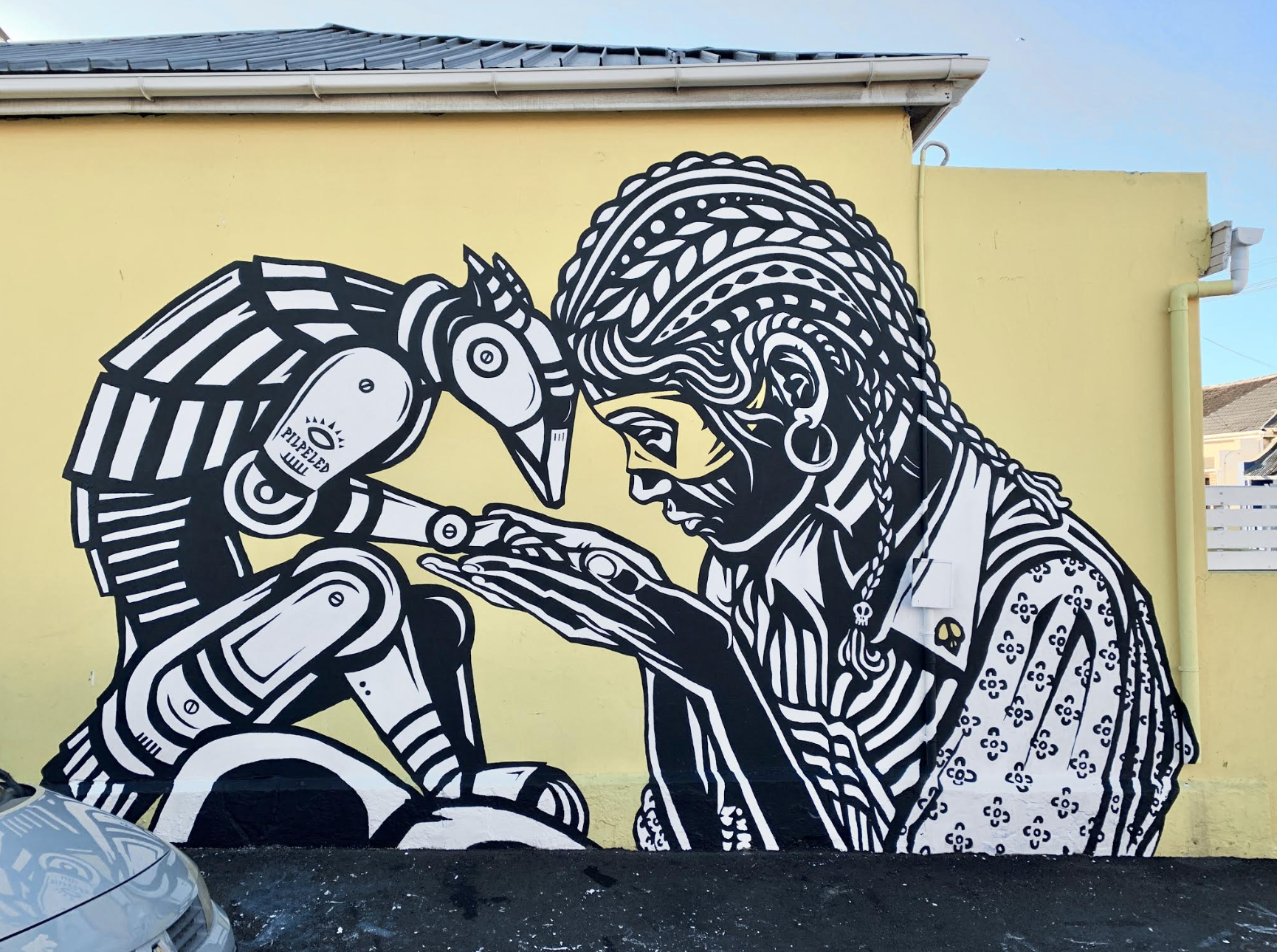
