= Dede (artist) =

Israeli graffiti artist

- The artist posing in front of their work, 2022
- Born: c. 1980s Gush Dan, Israel
- Education: Bezalel Academy of Arts and Design; HEAD
- Style: Stencillism
- Movement: Street art
- Partner: Nitzan Mintz
- Website: dedebandaid.com

Tag

Dede is the art name of an Israeli graffiti artist who began displaying works on the streets of Tel Aviv in 2006. Also known as Dede Bandaid, Dede’s work is well known for his widespread use of images of band-aids.

== Biography ==
Dede was born and raised in Tel Aviv, Israel. He was first exposed to graffiti art in his youth and at the age of 13 spray-painted a map of the Milky Way galaxy on the walls of his school. During his military service in the Israel Defense Forces, Dede began doing graffiti which included visual messages that were implicitly anti-establishment. These included childlike soldiers making soap bubbles, as well as policemen wearing ballerina outfits. After his release from the army, Dede often sprayed stencils of peace doves, large mutant animals, architecture, etc. as a way of communicating social and political ideas.

Finding inspiration in current day issues, in 2008 Dede began to reflect on contemporary events in Israel. Such were 2011 Israeli social justice protests, the Israeli housing crisis, Crony capitalism and homelessness.

Dede's works are mostly displayed in the public realm though he avoids pure acts of vandalism. Dede began displaying his work in Israeli galleries and museums in 2009 including Kishon Gallery, Alfred Gallery, P8, Tzadik Gallery, Zemack Gallery, Fresh Paint Art Fair, Ein-Hod Museum, Haifa Museum and more. He has also shown in galleries in Switzerland, Italy, France, New York, Germany and others.

== Work ==
Dede's early work entailed widespread stencil use. He has evolved in his style to free-style drawing and wheat pasting. A recurring theme in his work is the band-aid. The reason for Dede’s repeated use of the band-aid is unclear, and the artist himself has avoided giving it a precise meaning.

Dede gained much public attention for using large-scale elements in the public arena, turning them to iconic pieces of art, as if pointing at a relevant social or current affair for the public to pay attention to. Such examples were turning one of the Ayalon Highway intersections into a Yellow Submarine (album); turning an abandoned part of bridge into a cloth-pin; and turning a big empty parking lot into a missile target during the 2014 Israel-Gaza conflict. One of Dede's unique artworks which has attracted special attention was at the abandoned Dulphinarium in Tel-Aviv, notoriously known for the Dolphinarium discotheque suicide bombing, turning the sea-facing front of the structure into a Chattery Teeth, possibly being the biggest illegal piece of art in Israel.

To raise awareness of the Gaza war hostage crisis, Dede partnered with artist Nitzan Mintz and designers Tal Huber and Shira Gershoni to create the project Kidnapped from Israel. This guerrilla public street art campaign featured posters distributed around the world depicting over 240 innocent civilians who were abducted from Israel into the Gaza Strip by Hamas on 7 October 2023.

== Gallery ==
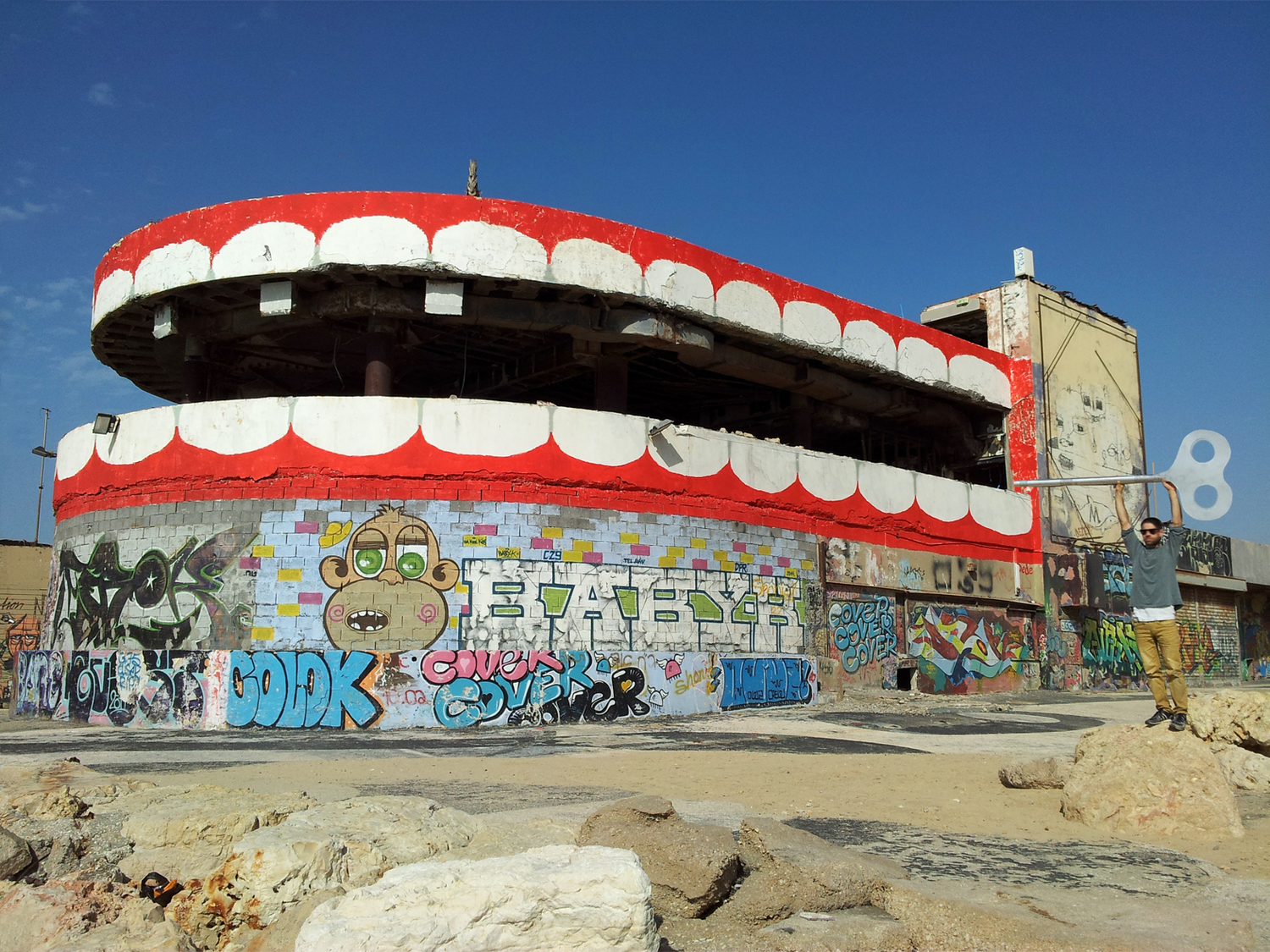
Original artwork by Dede at the abandoned Dolphinarium, Tel-Aviv, 2015.

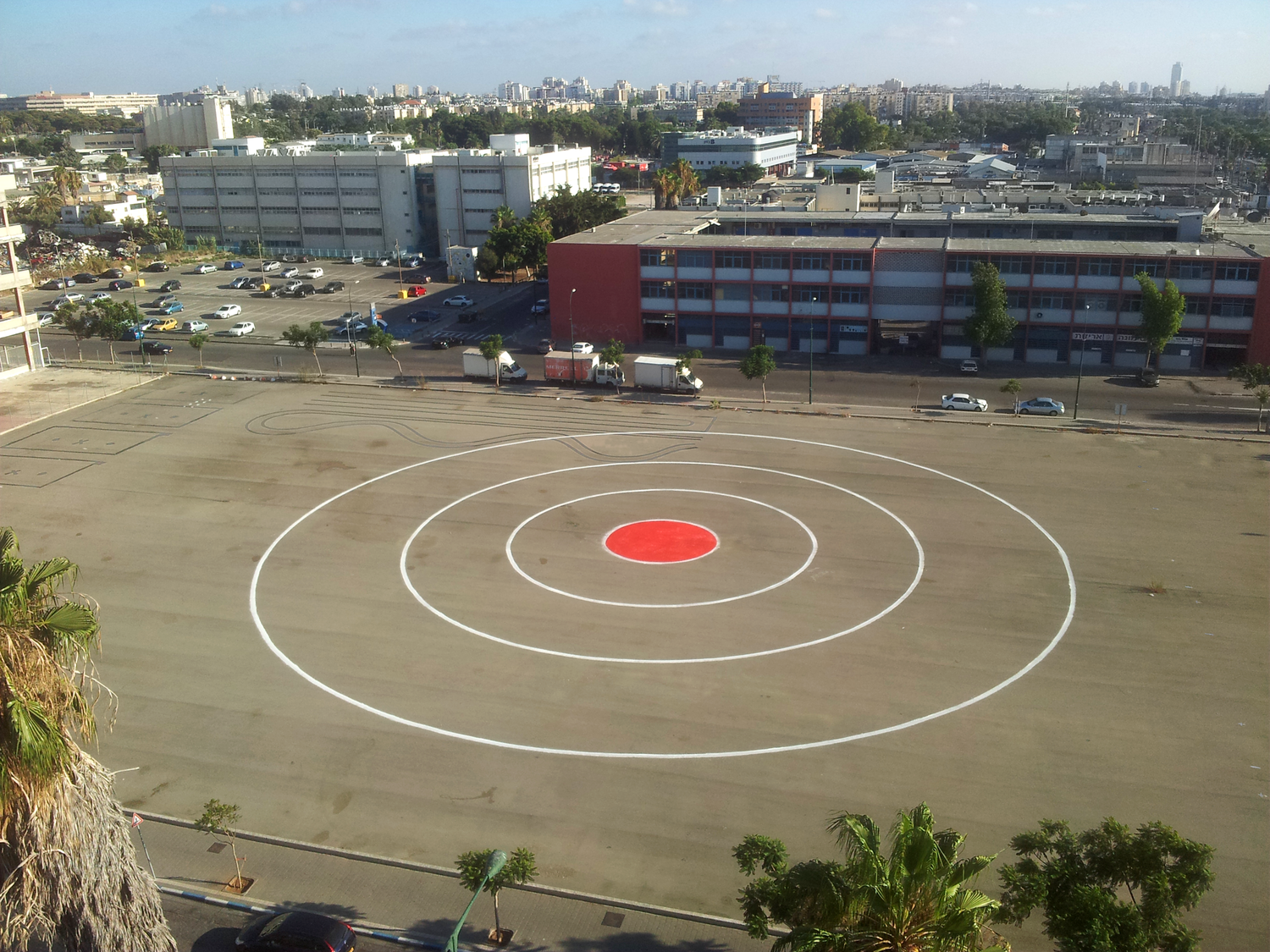
Original artwork by Dede in south Tel-Aviv, 2014.

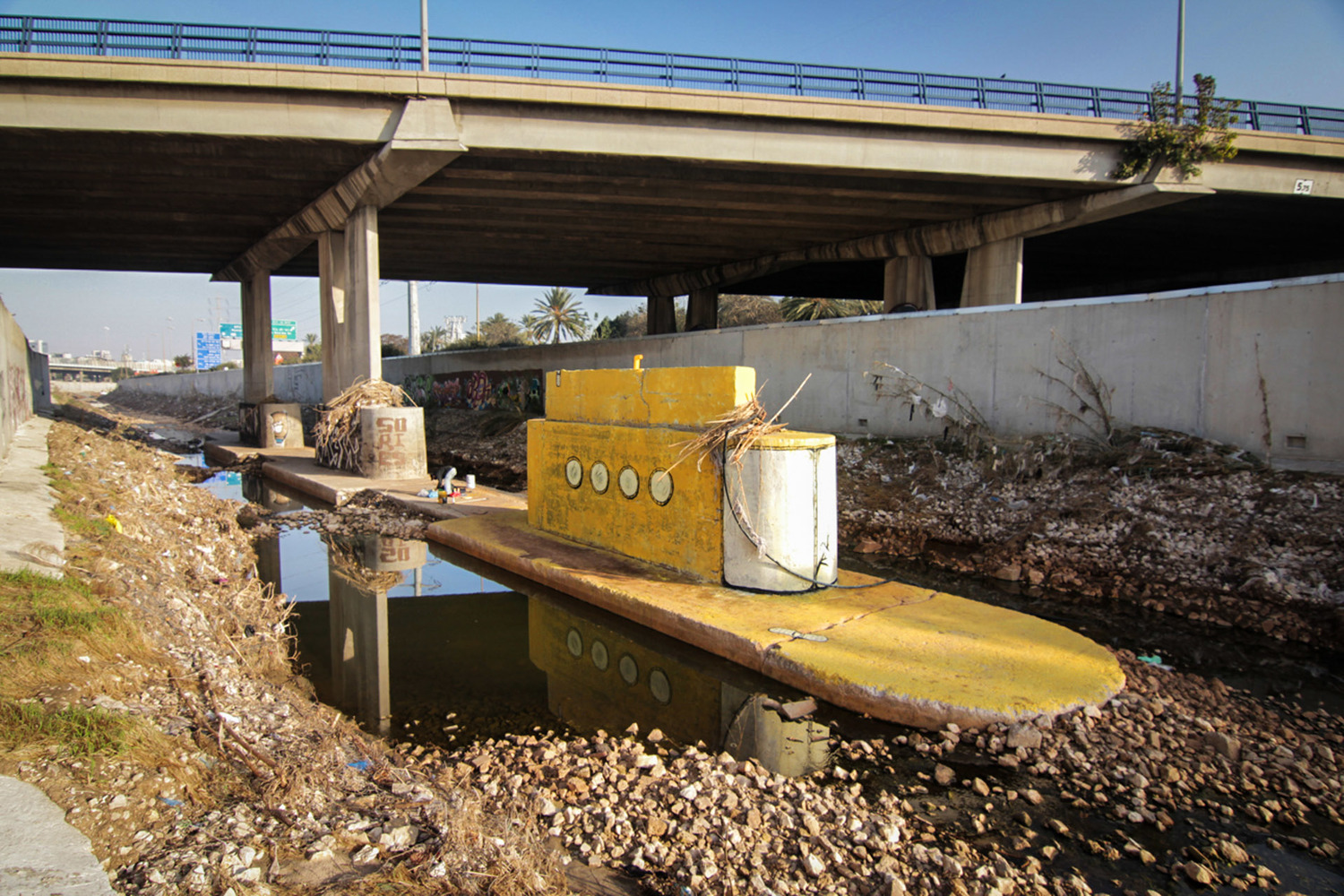
Original artwork by Dede at Ayalon river, Tel-Aviv, 2013.

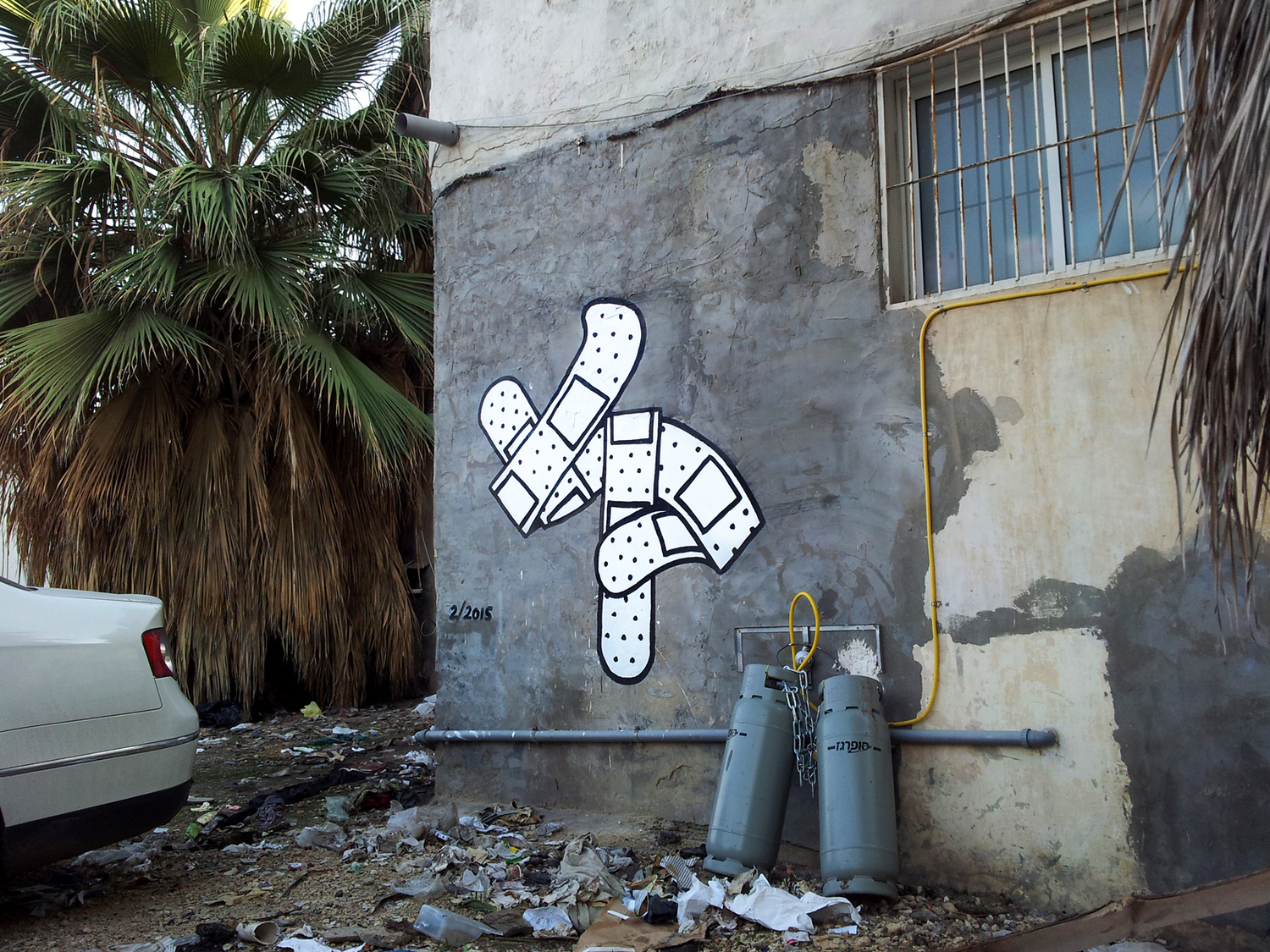
Original artwork painted on wall, Tel-Aviv, 2015.

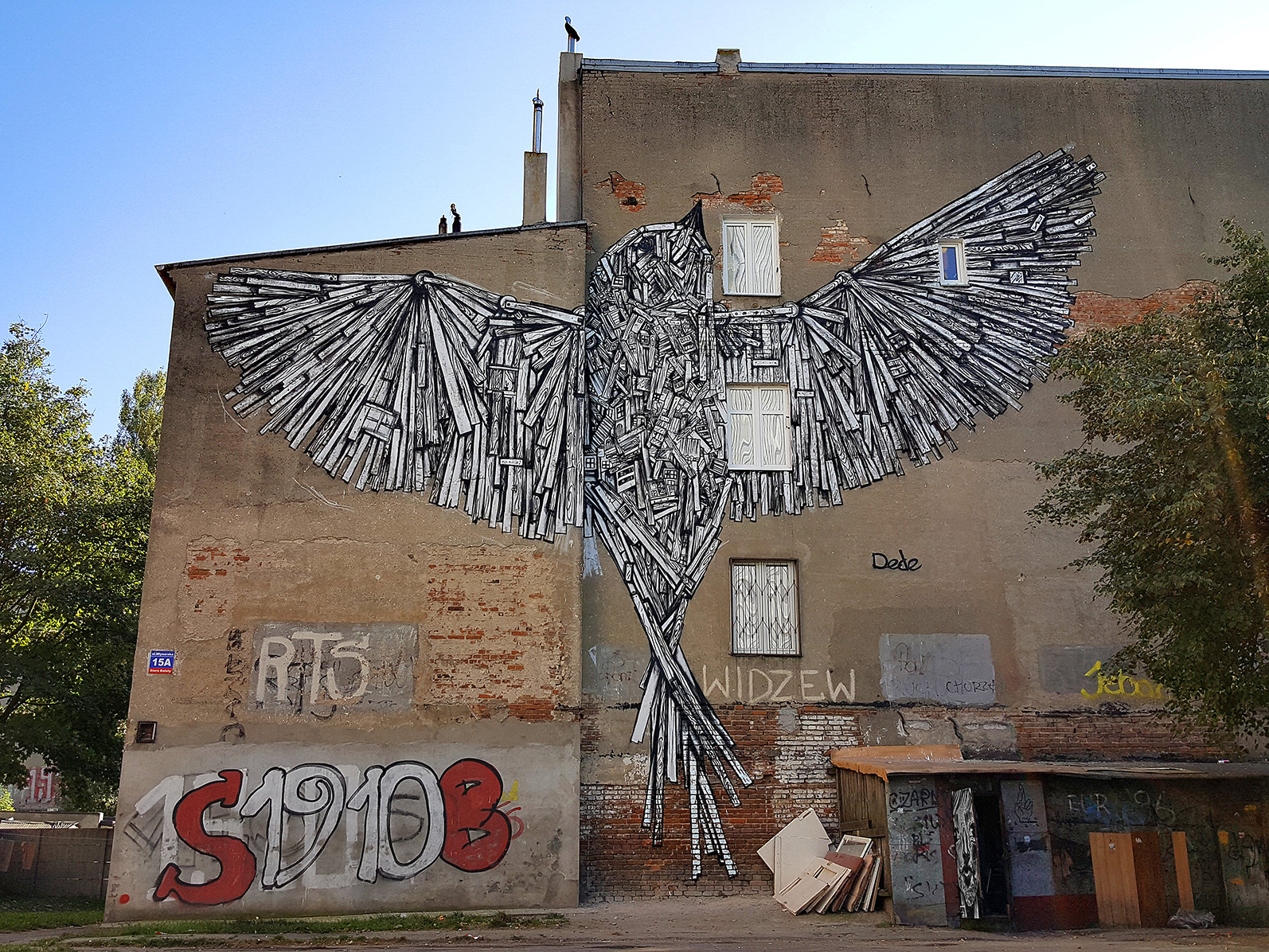
Original artwork painted on wall, Lodz, Poland, 2016.

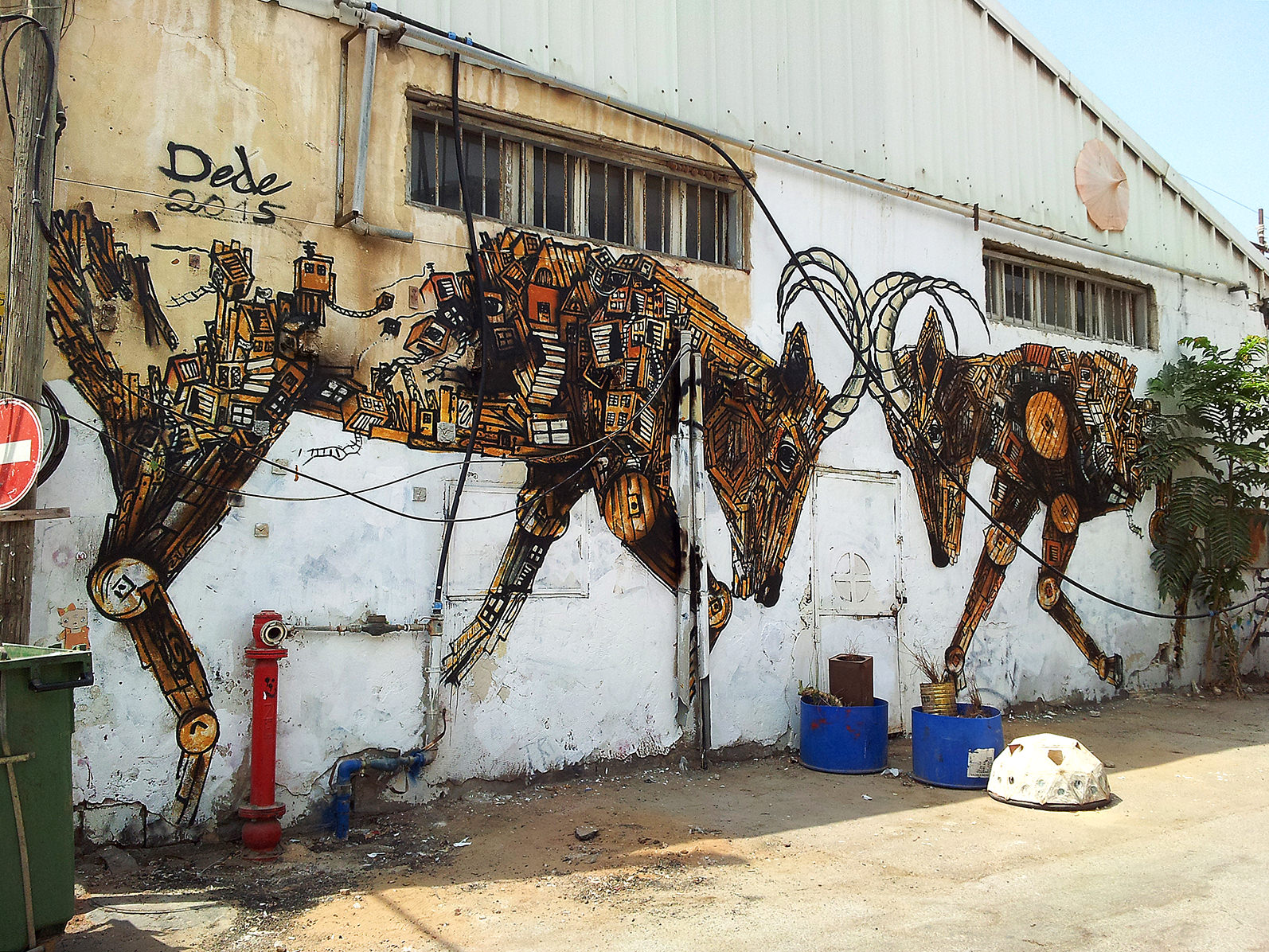
Original artwork painted on wall, Tel-Aviv, 2015.

== See also ==
- Jewish culture
- Street Art
- Florentine, Tel Aviv
- Banksy
- C215 (street artist)
- List of urban artists

== Bibliography ==
- Rojo, Jaime, and Harrigton, Steven. "The New Face of Tel Aviv Street Art", Huffington Post, 24/4/2013.
- Briggs, Gemma. "If Walls Could Talk", Time Out Israel, August 2011.
- Lanir, Tal (Ed.), "Street Art Israel", Tel Aviv Museum of Art, 2011.
- Merom, Hagai, "Tel Aviv's Graffiti Underground", Halfi Publishing House, Tel Aviv, 2011
