= Florentin, Tel Aviv =

Neighborhood in Tel-Aviv

Florentin פלורנטין
- Neighborhood
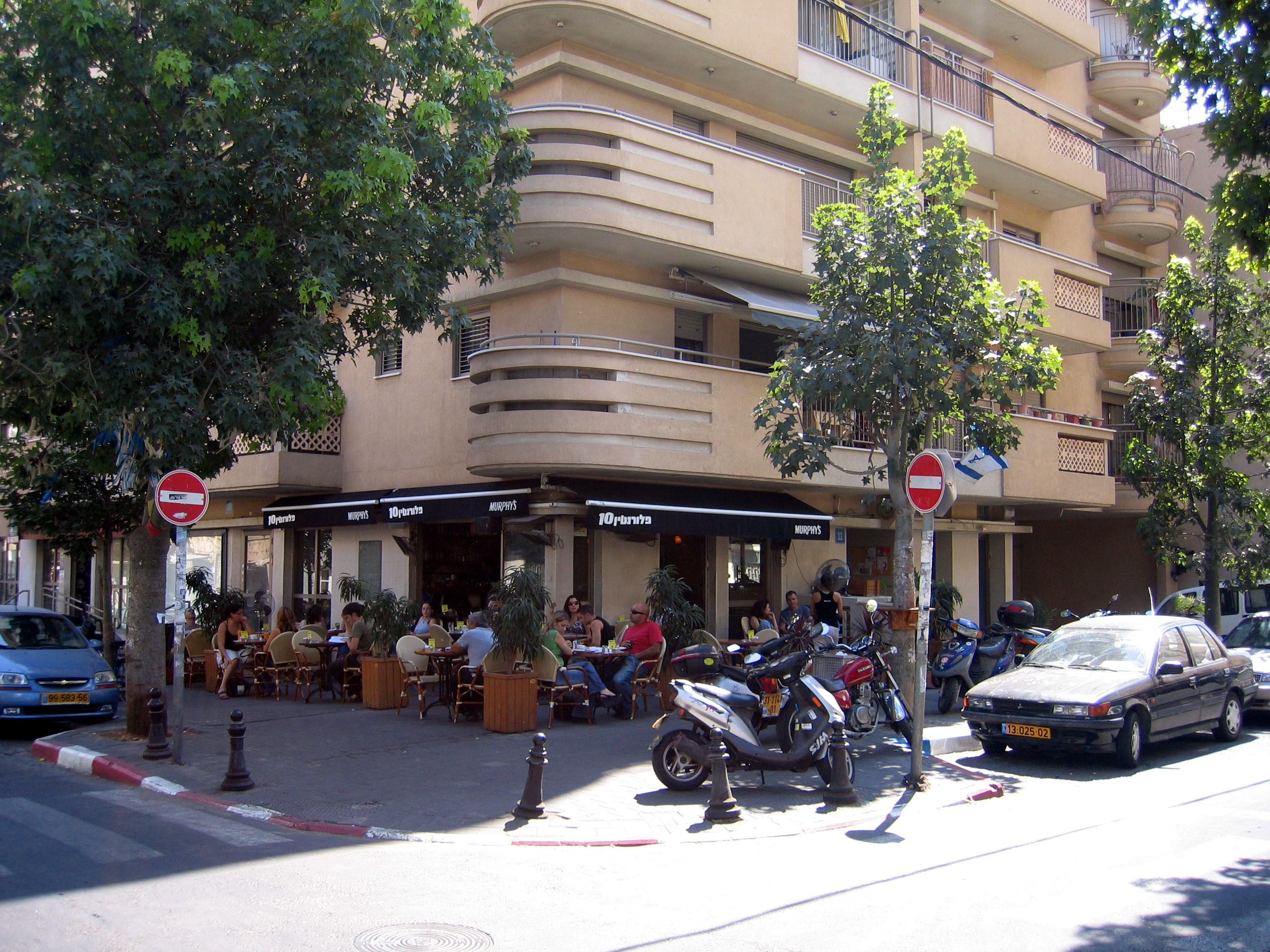
- A street cafe in Florentin
- Etymology: Named after Solomon Florentin
- Interactive map of Florentin
- Coordinates: 32°3′27.33″N 34°46′17.61″E

Florentin (Hebrew: פלורנטין) is a neighborhood in the southern part of Tel Aviv, Israel, named after Solomon Florentine, a Thessalonian Jew from the Greek city of Thessaloniki who purchased the land in 1924. Development of the area was spurred by its proximity to the Jaffa–Jerusalem railway.

Florentin was initially populated primarily by poor Sephardic Jewish immigrants from North Africa, Bulgaria, Turkey, and Greece, as well as Mizrahi Bukharan Jews. As with much of south Tel Aviv, for many decades it suffered from urban decay and poverty. By the 1960s, the area had declined from a working-class area to a slum, as the original residents moved out. However, since the 1990s and 2000s, the area has attracted many younger residents and artists who were first attracted by its lower rents, and the neighborhood is now also associated with a bohemian lifestyle. Florentin now has numerous artists' workshops, cafes, restaurants, markets, and graffiti tours. The area is also an industrial zone and a garment district, where both Jewish and Arab wholesalers buy and sell clothing and furniture. It contains Washington Boulevard, Tel Aviv's shortest street.

== History ==
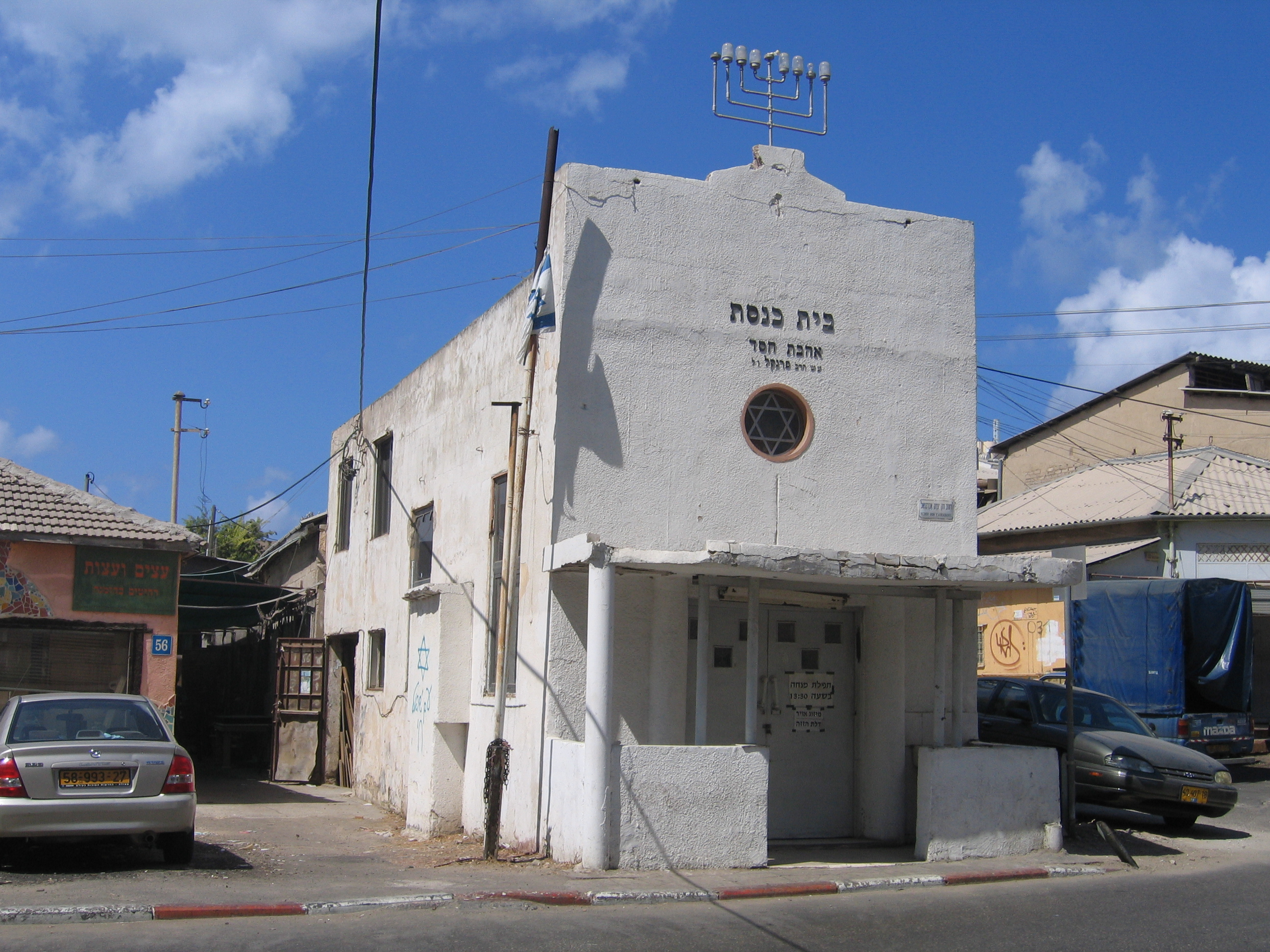
Historic Ahavat Chesed ("Loving kindness") synagogue in Florentin

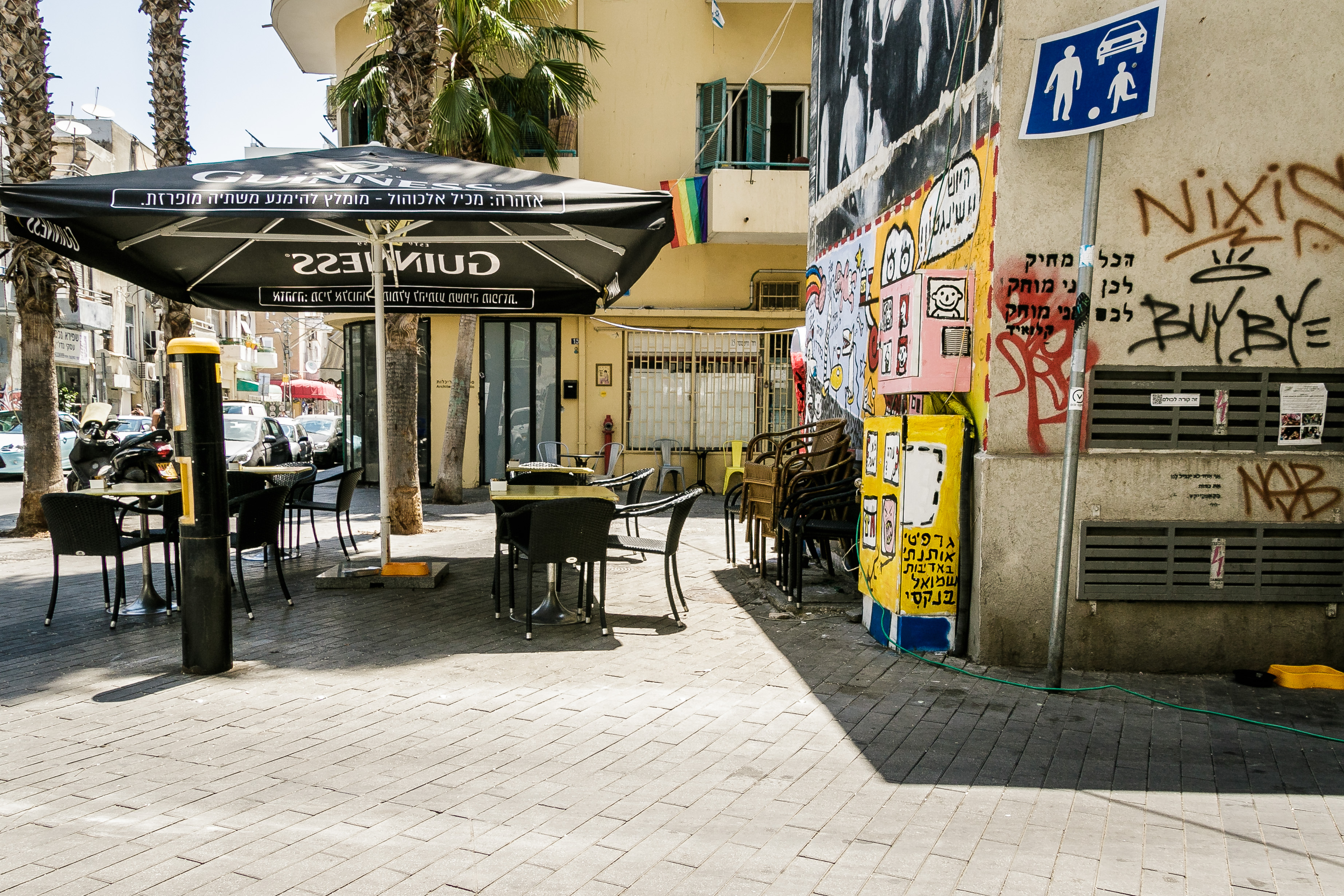
Outdoor cafe and graffiti in Florentin

The land was purchased in the 1920s by the Salonika-Palestine Investment Company, founded in 1921 by Jews in Salonika to develop commercial relations with Jewish settlements in Palestine. After World War I, compounding the effects of the Great Thessaloniki Fire of 1917 in which the city's Jewish quarter was destroyed, along with 12,000 homes, leaving over 70,000 homeless people. In 1924, the Salonika-Palestine Company sent an envoy to Palestine to purchase land in Jaffa, south of Tel Aviv's Herzl Street, in an area bordering Neveh Tzedek and Ahuzat Bayit that was close to the Jaffa–Jerusalem railroad. Due to Ottoman land laws, building in the area was held up until 1933.

Florentin was initially populated primarily by Jewish immigrants from North Africa, Bulgaria, Turkey, and Bukhara. For decades, it was a low-income neighbourhood, suffering from urban decay. By the 1960s, the area had declined from working class to a slum. The original Florentin residents moved out, and it had become a home for the city's poorest residents and a flophouse for illegal workers, mainly from Gaza.

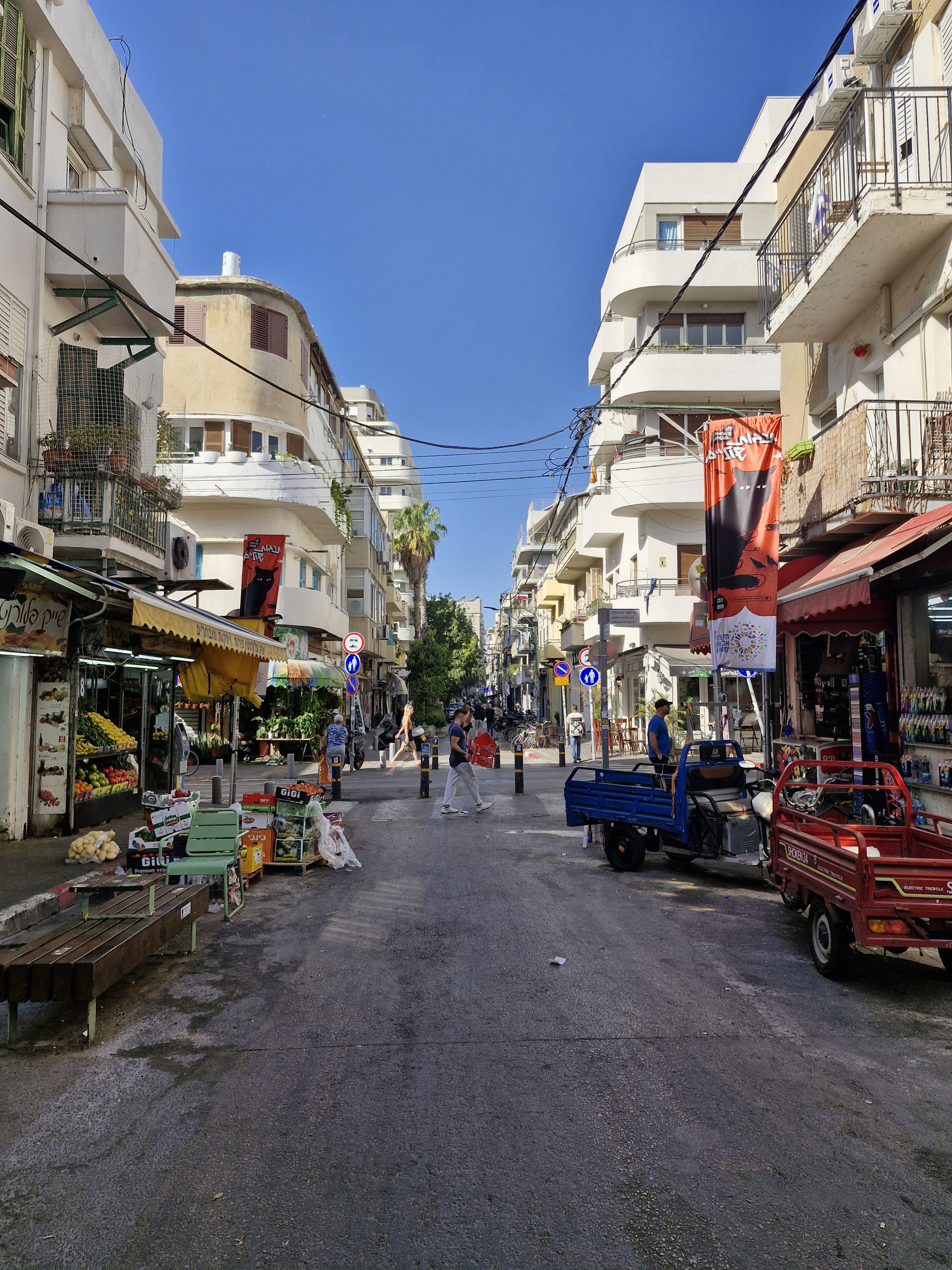
A pedestrianized section of Florentin

By the 1990s, many of the original buildings were semi-derelict. However, since the 1990s and 2000s, with the opening of many artists' workshops, and the decline of the traditional garment and furniture purchasing industries that had once sustained the area, it has become increasingly popular with artists and bohemians, who flocked to the area for its lower rents.

Florentin was the setting for a TV series in the broadcast between 1997–2001 called Florentin. The series helped to raise awareness of the existence of the neighborhood and to establish the previously neglected neighborhood in the Tel Aviv consciousness.

By the 2010s, Florentin now has numerous cafes, bars and graffiti tours. Today, the area is still also an industrial zone and a garment district, where both Jewish and Arab wholesalers buy and sell clothing and furniture.

== Economy ==
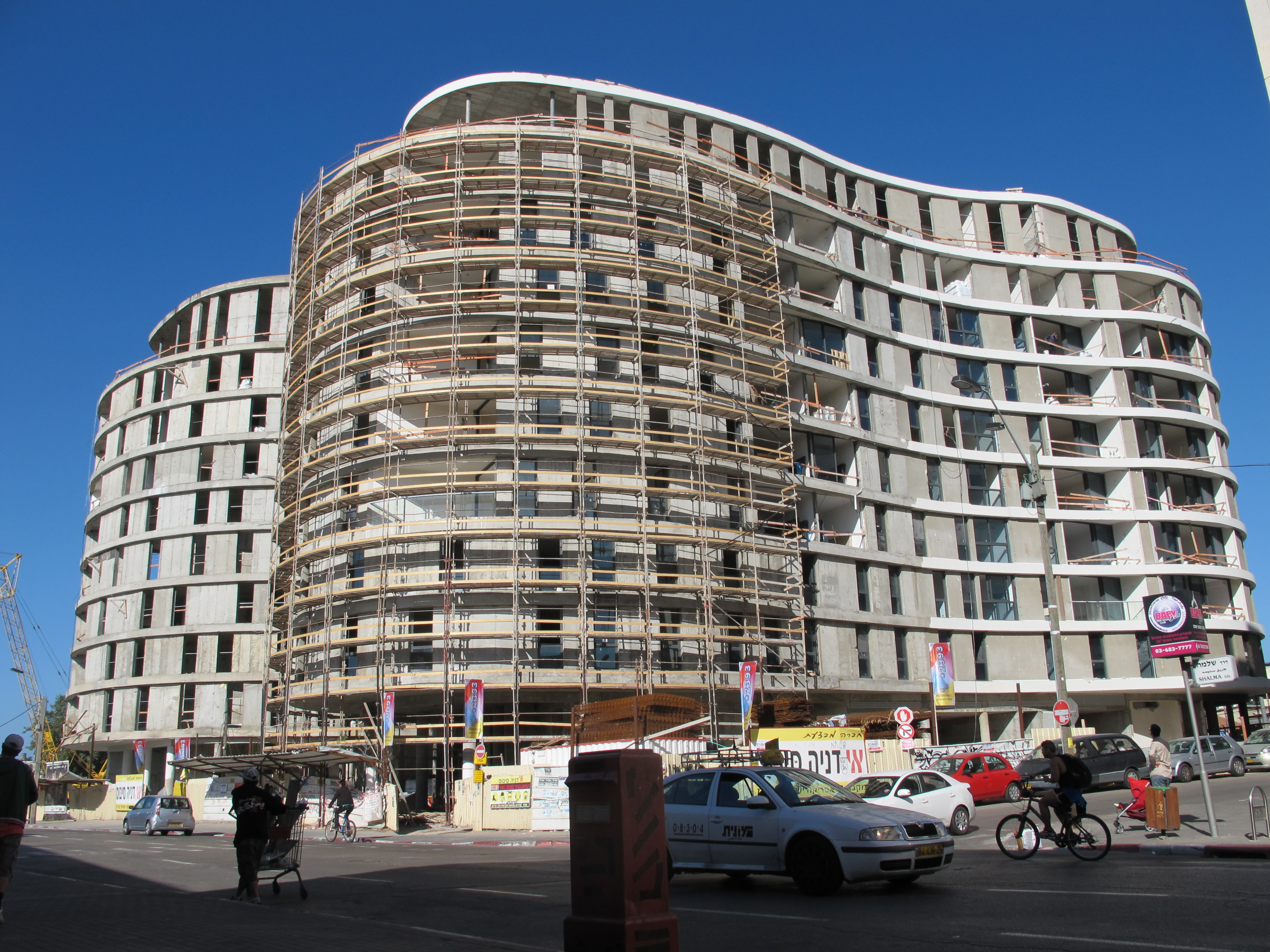
A housing project in the neighborhood

In 1933, the Jaffa Municipality allowed shops and light industries to be opened on the ground floors of the new residential buildings, providing a source of income for the wave of immigrants settling in Palestine at the time. Today it is a combination of industrial zone, garment district, marketplace, and assembly point for foreign workers looking for jobs. An urban renewal campaign sponsored by the Tel Aviv municipality in the 1990s led to a revival of the area, which has become a popular night spot.

== Art scene and street art ==
The area is known for its vibrant local art scene. The mix of garages and abandoned buildings attracted the wave of a bohemian community and opening of many workshops in the 1990s. Artists were attracted to and used the areas' crumbling walls as a canvas for murals.

Street art in Florentin often has strong political message. Local political conflicts between rival political groups have also taken place through graffiti battles on the walls of the neighbourhood.

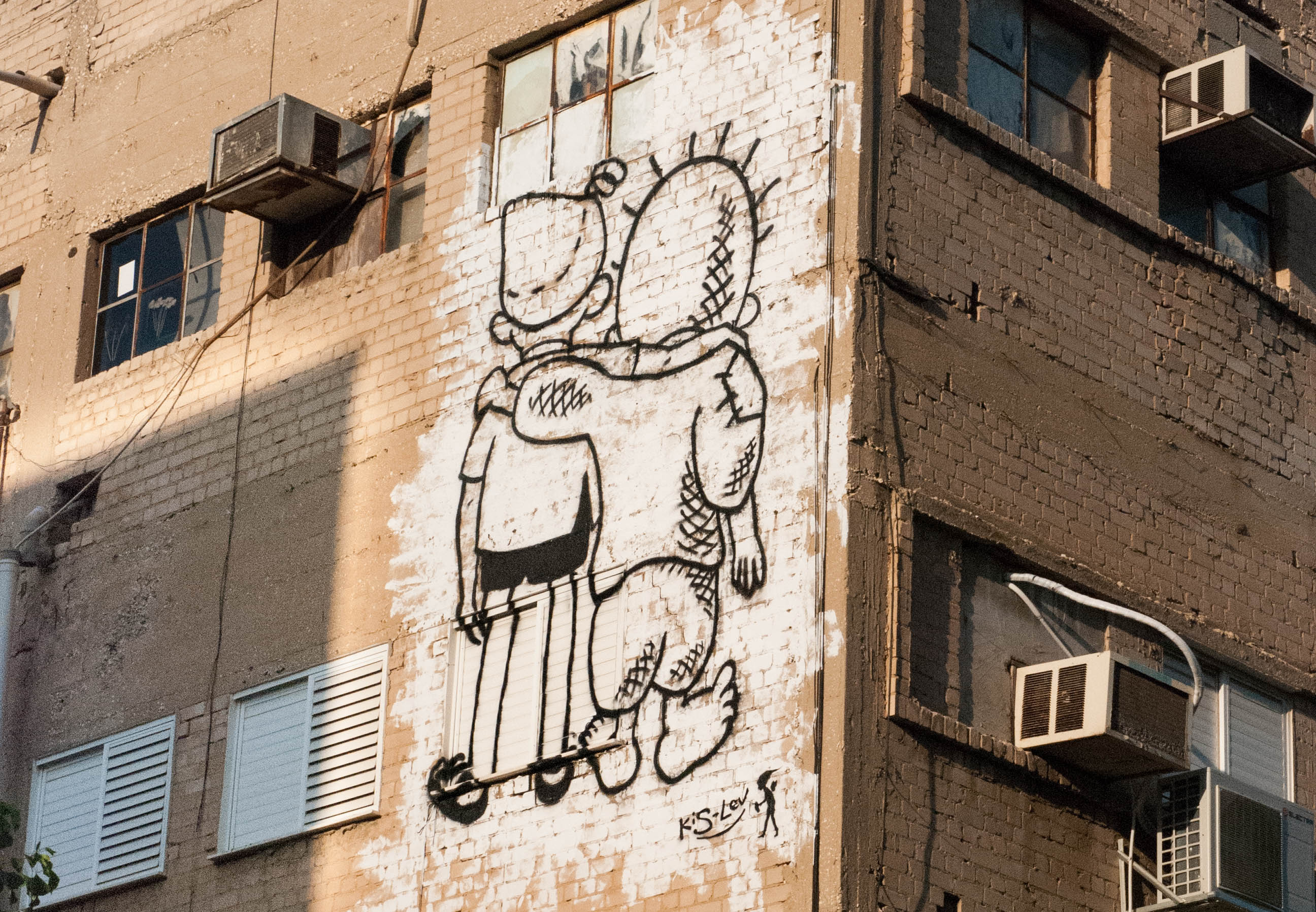
Graffiti as peace activism: The Peace Kids in Florentin depicting Israeli Srulik and Palestinian Handala embracing one another

Much of the graffiti is merely in text form, involving quotes of Hebrew poets, religious passages, and the dialogues taking place between various graffiti artists.

The graffiti has also brought opposition from local residents, and concerns about the declining standards of the graffiti itself as the area becomes more mainstream.

Street artists like Dede, Klone and Kis-Lev, and installation artists such as Sigalit Landau, made the working class neighborhood their home base. Famous works include a '27 Club' mural (27 Club graffiti in Tel Aviv) and a controversial depiction of the assassination of Yitzhak Rabin.

== Demography ==
The population nearly doubled from 3,900 to 7,000 people, of which today 21% are in the 35–44 age range, 33.7% are between the ages of 25 and 34, and children up to 17 years old make up 7% of the population.

== Notable residents ==
- Sigalit Landau (1969–), installation artist
- Dede, graffiti artist
- Nisim Aloni (1926–1998), playwright and translator
- Chaim Topol (1935–2023), actor, Oscar-nominated for his role as Tevye in Fiddler on the Roof, grew up in the neighborhood
- Ethan & Hila Klein, creators of h3h3Productions started their channel while living in Florentin.

== See also ==
- Neighborhoods of Tel Aviv
- Art in Tel Aviv
- History of Tel Aviv
