= Hydration =

Hydration may refer to:

- Hydrate, a substance that contains water
- Hydration enthalpy, energy released through hydrating a substance
- Hydration reaction, a chemical addition reaction where a hydroxyl group and proton are added to a compound
- Hydration shell, a type of solvation shell
- Hydration system, an apparatus that helps its user drink enough liquid while engaged in physical activity
  - Hydration pack, a type of hydration system composed of a carry-on pack used for hydration
- Mineral hydration, an inorganic chemical reaction where water is added to the crystal structure of a mineral
- Drinking in general, including:
  - Fluid replacement, the medical practice of replenishing bodily fluid
  - Oral rehydration therapy, hydration as a health treatment
  - Management of dehydration, medical hydration
- Tissue hydration, the supply and retention of adequate water in biological tissues
- Water of hydration, water that occurs within crystals
- Hydration (web development), the preparation of web page content for user interaction.
- Dough hydration, the percentage of water in a dough in relation to the amount of flour

== See also ==
- Dehydration (disambiguation)
- Solvation
