= Rehydration =

Rehydration may refer to:

- Fluid replacement therapy, which may use several routes.
- Restoring water content in previously dehydrated objects.
- Rehydration (web development), also called hydration

== See also ==
- Hydration (disambiguation)
