= Source Sandals =

Shoe manufacturer in Israel

Source Sandals, known in Hebrew as Shoresh Sandals (Hebrew: סנדלי שורש) are outdoor, trekking and hiking sandals made in the style of "biblical sandals". They are marketed as having a "Non-Slip sole even in wet conditions" and a "typical patented x-strap-design". They have a strong tradition especially in the world of backpackers. They are manufactured in Tirat Carmel in northern Israel and sold both in Israel and worldwide.

== History ==
Yoram "Yoki" Gill and Daniel Benoziliyo developed the design of Source Sandals in the late 1980s and established Source Vagabond Systems in 1989. Since then, Source (Shoresh) sandals have become popular among Israeli backpackers, to the point where travelling Israelis often recognize fellow Israelis by their footwear. More than 180,000 pairs are sold per year, with a growing share also outside of Israel.

== Product ==
The brand can be recognized by the straps forming an “x” below the ankle. Other typical features include: The sandals are delivered in a fabric bag instead of a cardboard box (the bags are often used by the travelers for toiletry and other purposes). And they feature a 'Green Dot' lifetime warranty. Every sandal bears a tag with a unique id-number, through which the sandal's manufacturing-history can be looked up. The sandals are manufactured in the company's factory in Tirat Carmel in northern Israel.

In recent years, Source has added a line of socks and hydration systems, selling to consumers and armies all over the world.

== See also ==
- Economy of Israel
