= Drinking =

Ingestion of water or other liquids

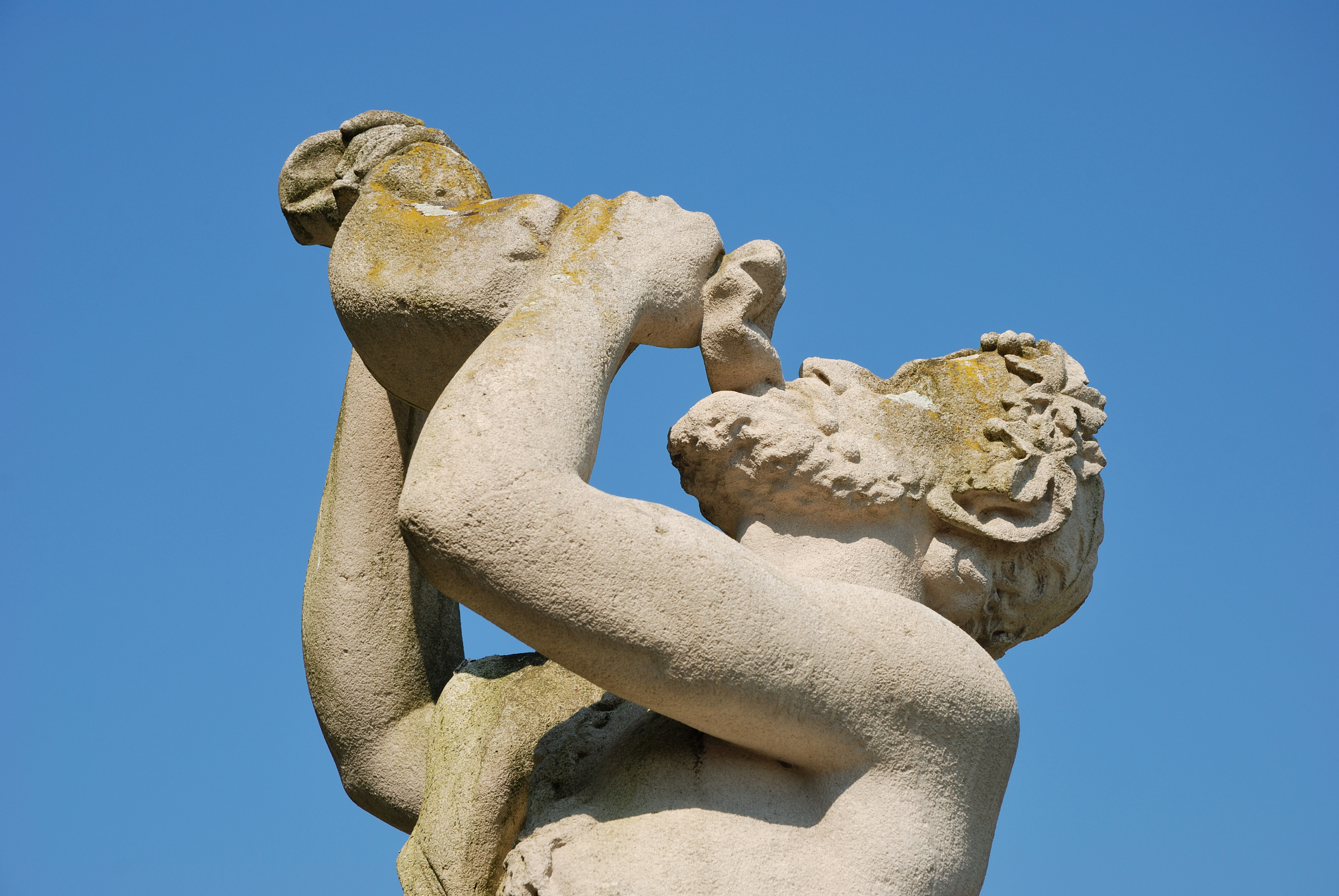
Statue drinking from a traditional waterskin

A person drinking a glass of beer

Drinking is the act of ingesting water or other liquids into the body through the mouth, proboscis, or elsewhere. Humans drink by swallowing, completed by peristalsis in the esophagus. The physiological processes of drinking vary widely among other animals.

Most animals drink water to maintain bodily hydration, although many can survive on the water gained from their food. Water is required for many physiological processes. Both inadequate and (less commonly) excessive water intake are associated with health problems.

== Methods of drinking ==
=== In humans ===
When a liquid enters a human mouth, the swallowing process is completed by peristalsis which delivers the liquid through the esophagus to the stomach; much of the activity is assisted by gravity. The liquid may be poured from the hands or drinkware may be used as vessels. Drinking can also be by sipping or sucking, typically when imbibing hot liquids or drinking from a spoon. Infants employ a method of suction wherein the lips are pressed tight around a source, as in breastfeeding: a combination of breath and tongue movement creates a vacuum which draws in liquid.

=== In other land mammals ===
Cat lapping water in slow motion

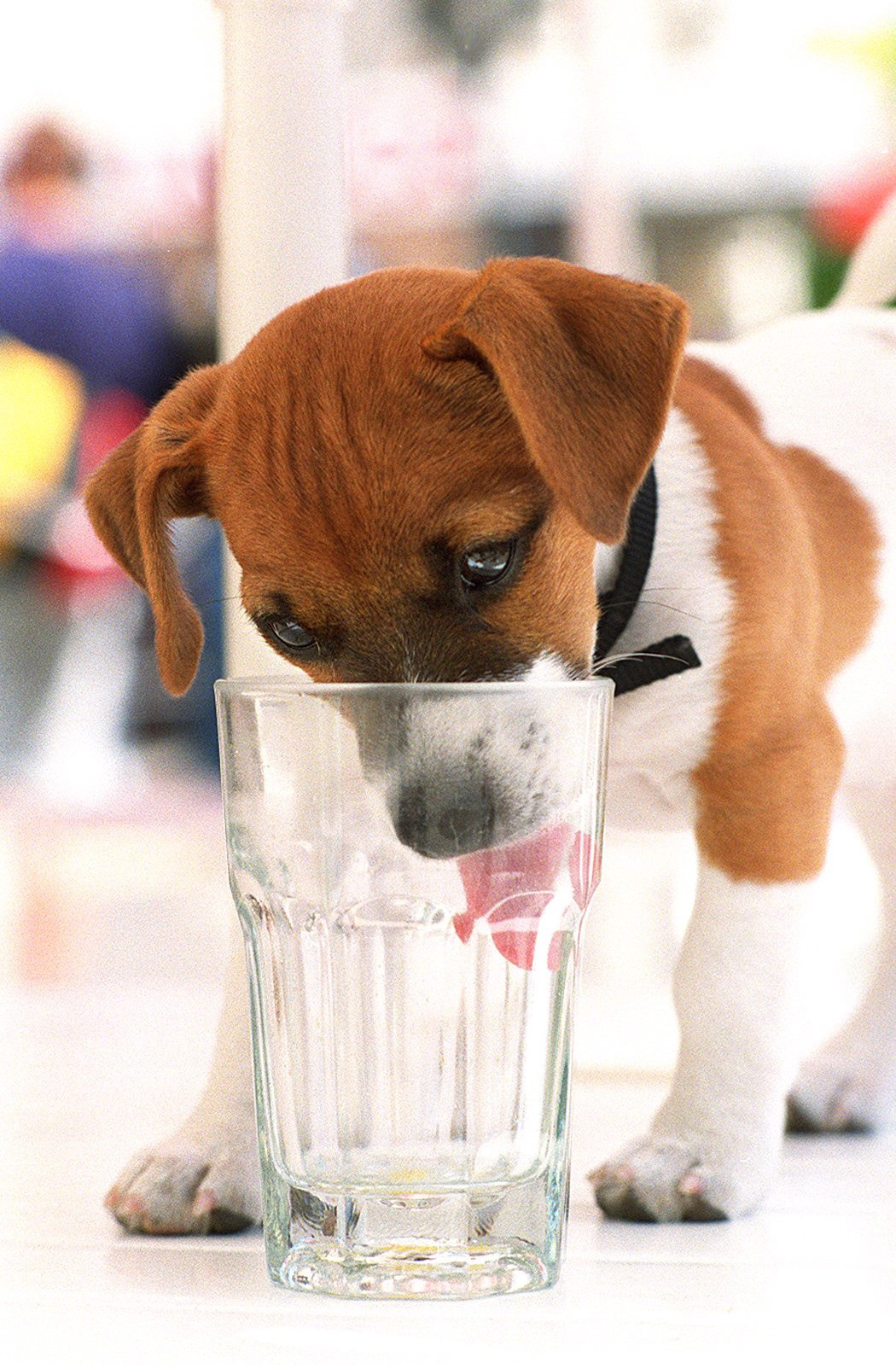
Jack Russell Terrier laps in water with its tongue.

By necessity, terrestrial animals in captivity become accustomed to drinking water, but most free-roaming animals stay hydrated through the fluids and moisture in fresh food, and learn to actively seek foods with high fluid content. When conditions impel them to drink from bodies of water, the methods and motions differ greatly among species.

Cats, canines, and ruminants all lower the neck and lap in water with their powerful tongues. Cats and canines lap up water with the tongue in a spoon-like shape. Canines lap water by scooping it into their mouth with a tongue which has taken the shape of a ladle. However, with cats, only the tip of their tongue (which is smooth) touches the water, and then the cat quickly pulls its tongue back into its mouth which soon closes; this results in a column of liquid being pulled into the cat's mouth, which is then secured by its mouth closing. Ruminants and most other herbivores partially submerge the tip of the mouth in order to draw in water by means of a plunging action with the tongue held straight. Cats drink at a significantly slower pace than ruminants, who face greater natural predation hazards.

Many desert animals do not drink even if water becomes available, but rely on eating succulent plants. In cold and frozen environments, some animals like hares, tree squirrels, and bighorn sheep resort to consuming snow and icicles. In savannas, the drinking method of giraffes has been a source of speculation for its apparent defiance of gravity; the most recent theory contemplates the animal's long neck functions like a plunger pump. Uniquely, elephants draw water into their trunks and squirt it into their mouths.

=== In birds ===
There are three general ways in which birds drink: using gravity itself, sucking, and by using the tongue. Fluid is also obtained from food.

Most birds are unable to swallow by the "sucking" or "pumping" action of peristalsis in their esophagus (as humans do), and drink by repeatedly raising their heads after filling their mouths to allow the liquid to flow by gravity, a method usually described as "sipping" or "tipping up". The notable exception is the family of pigeons and doves, the Columbidae; in fact, according to Konrad Lorenz in 1939:

one recognizes the order by the single behavioral characteristic, namely that in drinking the water is pumped up by peristalsis of the esophagus which occurs without exception within the order. The only other group, however, which shows the same behavior, the Pteroclidae, is placed near the doves just by this doubtlessly very old characteristic.

Although this general rule still stands, since that time, observations have been made of a few exceptions in both directions.

In addition, specialized nectar feeders like sunbirds (Nectariniidae) and hummingbirds (Trochilidae) drink by using protrusible grooved or trough-like tongues, and parrots (Psittacidae) lap up water.

Many seabirds have glands near the eyes that allow them to drink seawater. Excess salt is eliminated from the nostrils. Many desert birds get the water that they need entirely from their food. The elimination of nitrogenous wastes as uric acid reduces the physiological demand for water, as uric acid is not very toxic and thus does not need to be diluted in as much water.

Most birds scoop or draw water into the buccal areas of their bills, raising and tilting their heads back to drink. An exception is the common pigeon, which can suck in water directly by inhalation.

=== In insects ===
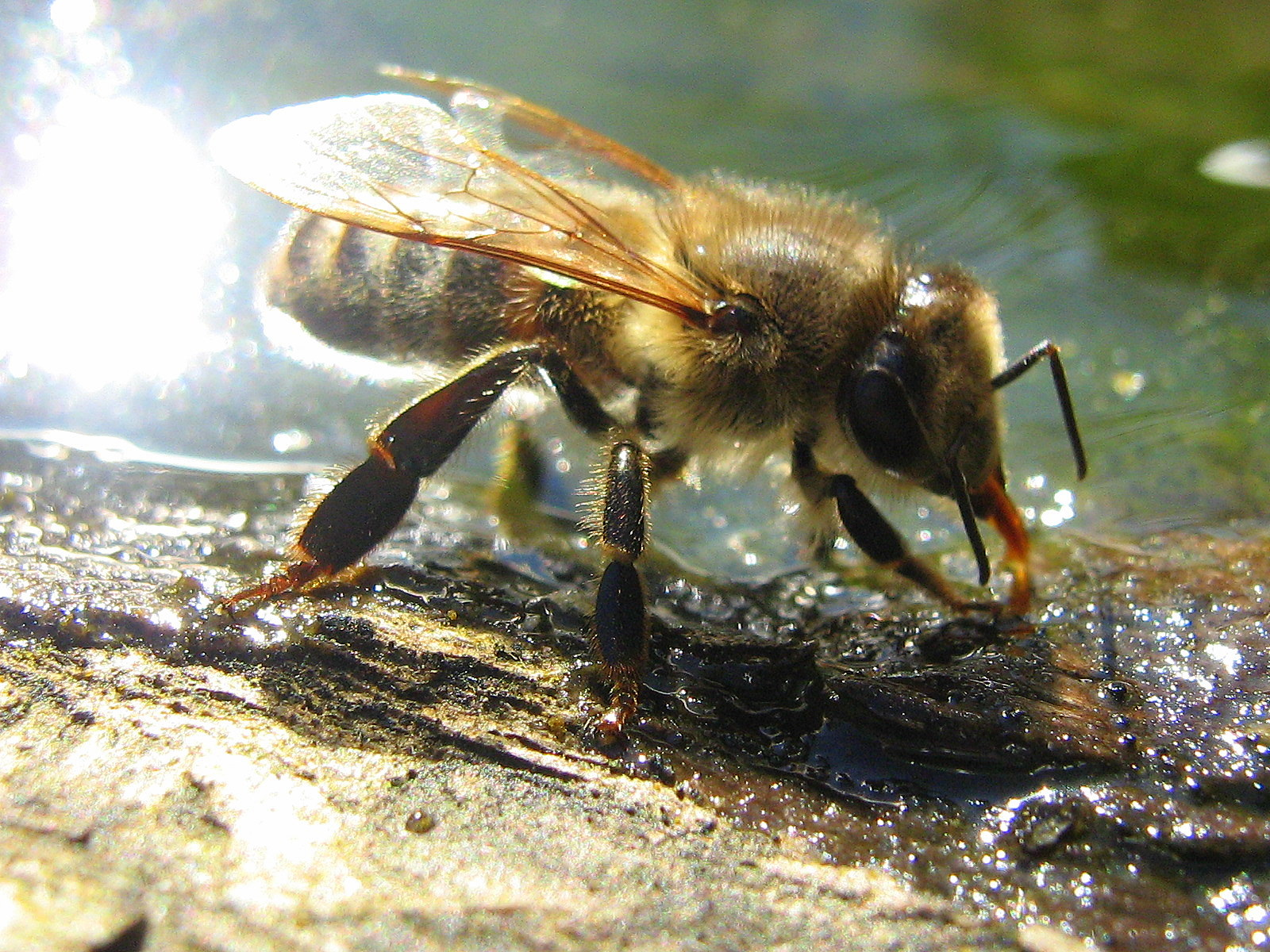
Drinking can be observed in many insect species.

Most insects obtain adequate water from their food: When dehydrated from a lack of moist food, however, many species will drink from standing water. Additionally, all terrestrial insects constantly absorb a certain amount of the air's humidity through their cuticles. Some desert insects, such as Onymacris unguicularis, have evolved to drink substantially from nighttime fog.

=== In marine life ===
Amphibians and aquatic animals which live in freshwater do not need to drink: they absorb water steadily through the skin by osmosis. Saltwater fish, however, drink through the mouth as they swim, and purge the excess salt through the gills. Saltwater fishes do drink plenty of water and excrete a small volume of concentrated urine.

== Hydration and dehydration ==
Like nearly all other life forms, humans require water for tissue hydration. Lack of hydration causes thirst, a desire to drink which is regulated by the hypothalamus in response to subtle changes in the body's electrolyte levels and blood volume. A decline in total body water is called dehydration and will eventually lead to death by hypernatremia. Methods used in the management of dehydration include assisted drinking or oral rehydration therapy.

An overconsumption of water can lead to water intoxication, which can dangerously dilute the concentration of salts in the body. Overhydration sometimes occurs among athletes and outdoor laborers, but it can also be a sign of disease or damage to the hypothalamus. A persistent desire to drink inordinate quantities of water is a psychological condition termed polydipsia. It is often accompanied by polyuria and may itself be a symptom of diabetes mellitus or diabetes insipidus.

=== Human water requirements ===
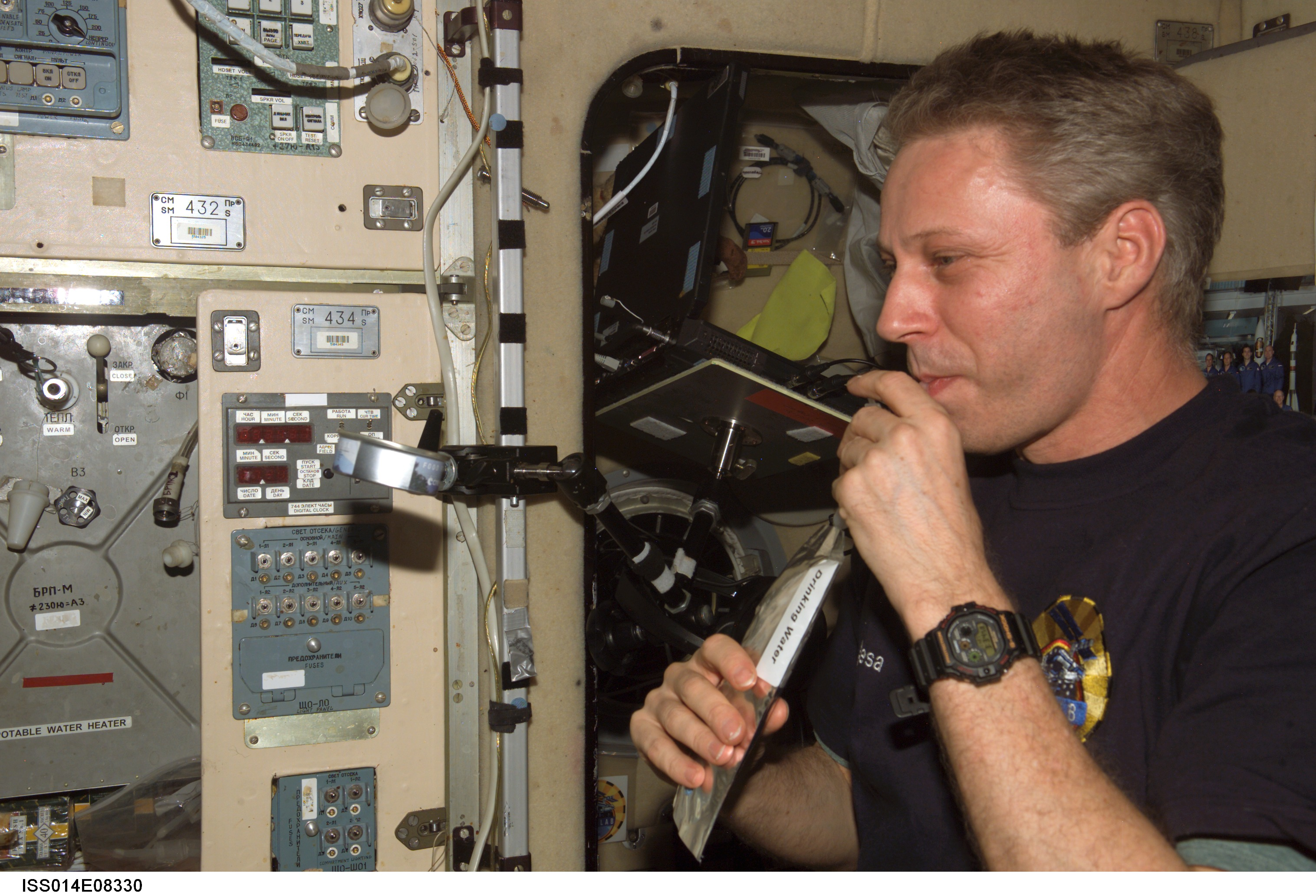
Astronaut Thomas Reiter during Expedition 14 drinking water on the International Space Station

A daily intake of water is required for the normal physiological functioning of the human body. The USDA recommends a daily intake of total water: not necessarily by drinking but by consumption of water contained in other beverages and foods. The recommended intake is 3.7 liters (appx. 1 gallon) per day for an adult male, and 2.7 liters (appx. 0.75 gallon) for an adult female.

Other sources, however, claim that a high intake of fresh drinking water, separate and distinct from other sources of moisture, is necessary for good health – eight servings per day of eight fluid ounces (1.8 liters, or 0.5 gallon) is the amount recommended by many nutritionists, although there is no scientific evidence supporting this recommendation.

Evidence-based hydration experts say that the amount of drinking water needed depends on ambient temperature, activity level, body size, and sweat rate. Research shows drinking when thirsty will maintain hydration to within about 2% of the needed level. Drinking beyond thirst might be beneficial for people who need to perform tasks that require intense concentration, and those with kidney disease, kidney stones, urinary tract infections, and people with a weak sense of thirst (which may include more older people).

== Alcoholic beverages ==
The term "drinking" is often used metonymically for the consumption of alcoholic beverages. Most cultures throughout history have incorporated some number of the wide variety of "strong drinks" into their meals, celebrations, ceremonies, toasts and other occasions. Evidence of fermented drinks in human culture goes back as early as the Neolithic Period, and the first pictorial evidence can be found in Egypt around 4,000 BC.

Alcohol consumption has developed into a variety of well-established drinking cultures around the world. Despite its popularity, alcohol consumption poses significant health risks. Alcohol abuse and the addiction of alcoholism are common maladies in developed countries worldwide. A high rate of consumption can also lead to cirrhosis, gastritis, gout, pancreatitis, hypertension, various forms of cancer, and numerous other illnesses.

== See also ==
- Eating
- Hydration (disambiguation)
