= Water loss =

Water loss may refer to:

- Dehydration (disambiguation)
- Leakage of water, especially in water supply networks
  - s.a. Non-revenue water
