= CamelBak =

American outdoor equipment company

CamelBak Products, LLC
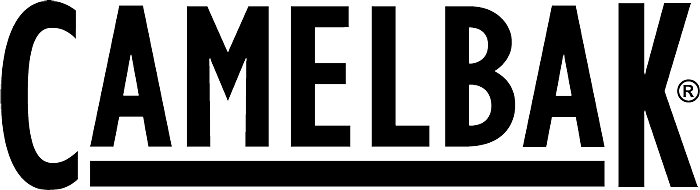
- Industry: Sports equipment
- Founded: 1989; 37 years ago
- Founder: Michael Eidson
- Headquarters: Petaluma, California, U.S.
- Key people: Greg Williamson (President)
- Products: Hydration pack; bottles; gloves; large combat/tactical packs; accessories
- Owner: Vista Outdoor
- Number of employees: 51–200
- Website: camelbak.com

CamelBak Products, LLC is an American outdoor equipment company based in Petaluma, California, best known for its hydration products, such as hydration packs and water bottles. CamelBak is also a supplier of protective gear and other products to the U.S. military.

== History ==
In 1989, CamelBak founder Michael Eidson was competing in the Hotter 'n Hell 100 bicycle race in Wichita Falls, Texas. Eidson, who was an emergency medical technician by trade, filled an IV bag with water and stuck it in a tube sock. He then pinned the tube sock to the back of his jersey, pulled the tube over his shoulder, and secured it with a clothes pin. Within a few months, he brought the idea to Roger Fawcett, who tested it in scientific studies, and began selling the first CamelBak product, the ThermalBak. This product failed to catch on at first because cyclists thought it looked "geeky". After almost giving up, Fawcett decided to spend his last $50,000 on an advertising agency and marketing the product. Barbara Mizuno came up with the slogan "Hydrate or Die", and sales skyrocketed. It is now one of the most popular water bottle companies for mountain bikers.

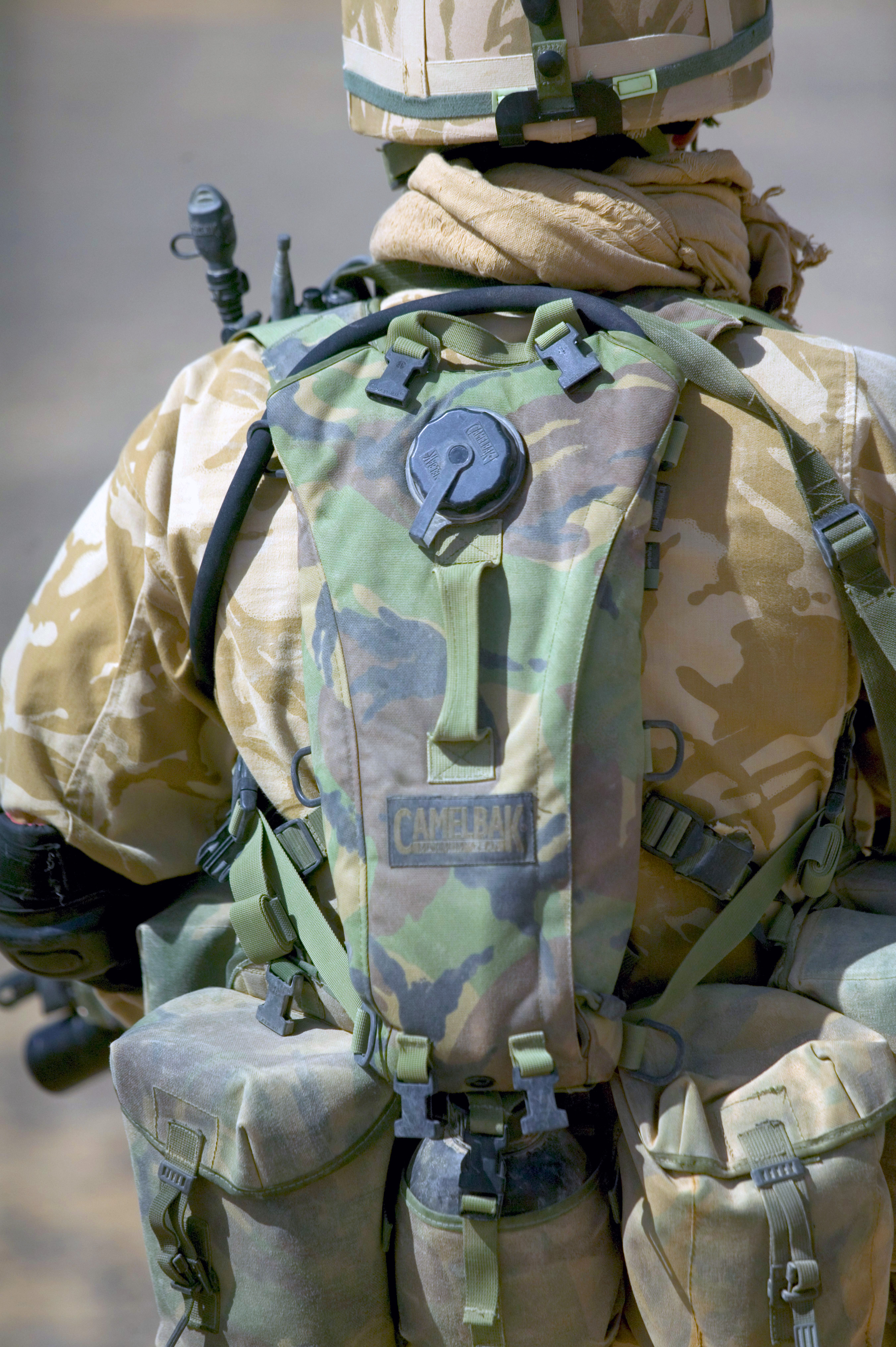
A Thermobak in the DPM Pattern in use by a British Soldier

U.S. troops took CamelBak products into battle in the Gulf War and they quickly became a popular product at military exchanges. CamelBak's defense sales grew further during the Iraq War and the war in Afghanistan. U.S. and foreign government contracts made up about 40% of CamelBak's business as of 2012.

CamelBak was sold to San Francisco toymaker Kransco in 1996 for $5 million. Bear Stearns Merchant Banking bought it for $210 million in 2004.

In 2006, CamelBak expanded into the water bottle business. The company differentiated its bottles by making them taste-free, using bite valves designed to stop leaks while allowing easy sipping. Eliminating the use of BPA In 2011, water bottles accounted for about 31% of CamelBak's sales.

Compass Diversified Holdings, a private equity firm, purchased the company in August 2010 for $258 million.

In February 2015, CamelBak filed a patent-infringement suit against Osprey to protect its hands-free reservoir hydration systems. The suit was settled in July 2015 on confidential terms.

CamelBak was purchased by Vista Outdoor in July 2015 for $412.5 million. Vista Outdoor was to integrate CamelBak's 300 employees into its outdoor products division.

CamelBak moved to Petaluma, California, in 1999. As of 2017, about 150 people work at its headquarters there. The company converted its rented office space into a LEED-certified facility. All CamelBak products are designed and tested in Petaluma. The company manufactures its products at other locations in the United States, Mexico, and Asia. Greg Williamson, formerly of Arctic Cat and Black & Decker, became president of CamelBak in July 2018. In February 2024, CamelBak announced that the Petaluma headquarters would be closing, and Williamson was being laid off.

== Products ==
=== Hydration packs ===
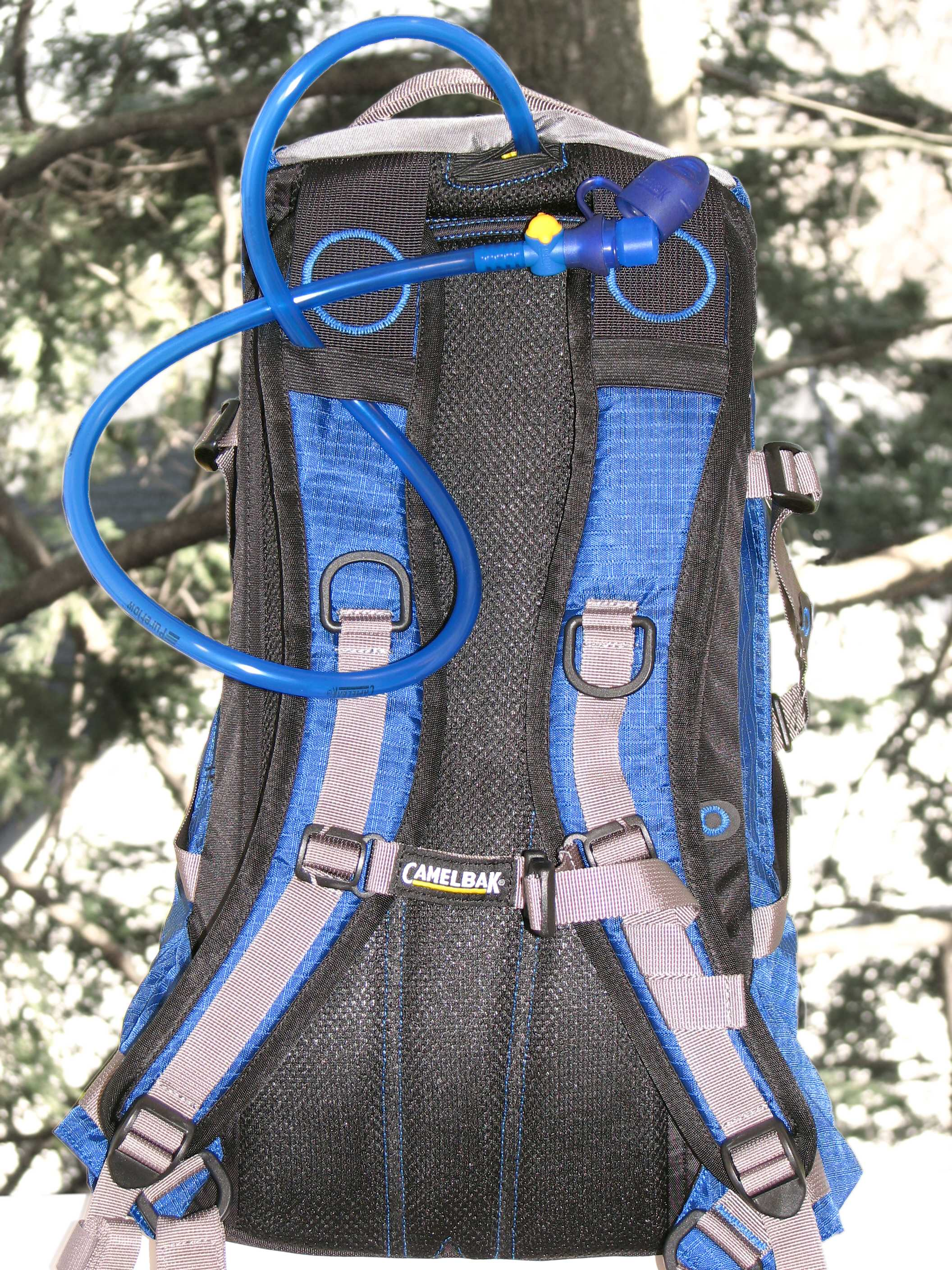
An example of a civilian CamelBak pack. The blue tube coming off the top enables the wearer to drink from the internal water bladder without removing the pack.

CamelBak's hydration packs come in capacities of 1.5 to 3.0 litres (50–100 US fluid oz) in a backpack style primarily for biking, hiking and other outdoor activities, with smaller belt-type 0.83 to 1.3 litre (28–45 US fluid oz) packs designed for runners and walkers.

CamelBak also makes bottles, general purpose backpacks, and some specialized military and law-enforcement gear, ranging from simple back-worn water reservoirs with little to no cargo capacity, to large rucksacks with various accessories, even PALS webbing to accommodate MOLLE gear.

One of CamelBak's military lines features reservoirs that resist chemical and biological weapons; they are designed to be used with gas masks. The United States Army approved the use of CamelBak CBR X hydration packs in November 2015. The Army's office of the Product Manager-Soldier Clothing and Individual Equipment and the Army's Test and Evaluation Command approved the three-liter CBR X after exposing it to nerve agents for six hours, after thirty days of use in the field, and then verifying that the water inside remained uncontaminated, and, performing numerous other tests since 2006.

=== Water purification ===
In January 2012, CamelBak started selling its All Clear portable water purification system which uses ultraviolet light to make untreated water potable in about one minute.

In 2014, CamelBak released a filtered water pitcher called the Relay. CamelBak claims that the Relay filters water ten times faster than competing products; this is fast enough to keep up with the flow rate of a kitchen faucet. The Relay uses large pleated filters that last about four months.

In 2021, CamelBak introduced a new line of filtration water bottles and reservoirs in a partnership with LifeStraw. The product line includes Vacuum Stainless Steel and Tritan Renew water bottles, and a 2 liter reservoir filtration kit.

== See also ==
- Hydration system
