= Source Vagabond Systems =

SOURCE Vagabond Systems Ltd.
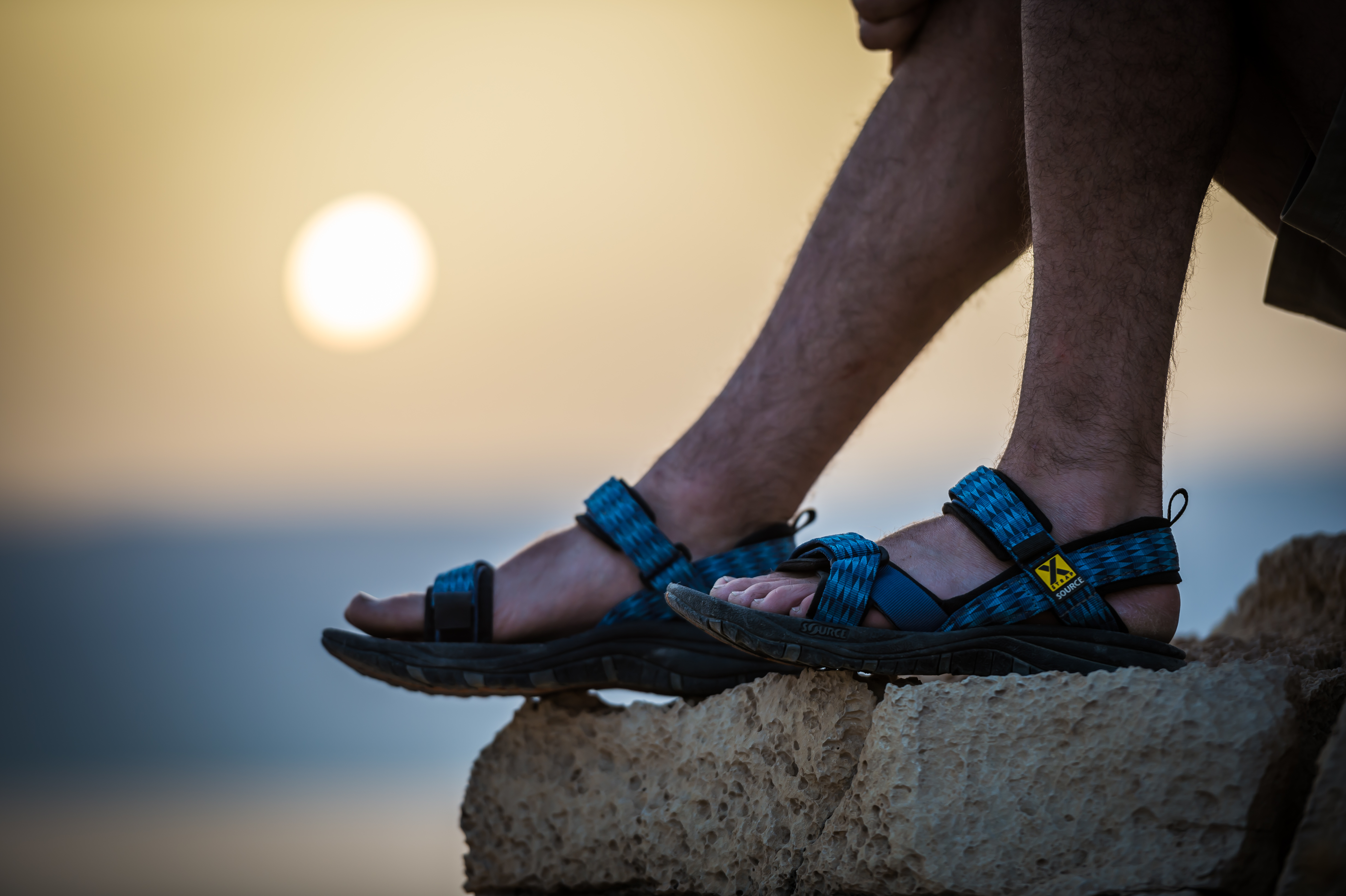
- Industry: Sport equipment, outdoor gear, tactical gear
- Founded: 1989
- Founder: Yoki Gill (יוקי גיל) and Daniel Benoziliyo (דניאל בנוזיליו)
- Headquarters: Tirat Carmel, Israel
- Owner: Privately held
- Number of employees: 250+
- Website: SourceOutdoor.com, SourceTacticalGear.com

Source Vagabond Systems Ltd. (brand: SOURCE) is known in the outdoor, trekking and sports market for sandals, hydration systems, packs and accessories and in the tactical market for hydration systems, packs, and its SOURCE Virtus Soldier System.

== History ==
SOURCE (Shoresh in Hebrew) was founded in 1989 by Yoki Gill and Daniel Benoziliyo. Using modern technology, the company manufacturers tactical Gear, hiking sandals, hydration and travel accessories. It sells its products in 25 countries, including the United States, Canada, United Kingdom, France, Germany, Switzerland, Australia, South Africa and many more.

The first Source Sandals were sold in 1991 under the name Shoresh (Hebrew for root, spring: שורש). There were 3 models: Biblical sandals, Roman sandals and Asian sandal. All featured a triple-layered sole and the X-strap system, a patented design allowing the sandal to be fit to the foot independently from the heel.

In 1995 the sandals were renamed Trek and Stream. Other models that have been added since then are the Classic, the Gobi, and the Djibouti.

In 1993 the first hydration system, Flexi-Flask, was introduced. In 1995, a water pipe was added to the system. In 2000 there were more than 8 types of hydration packs and accessories on sale: Rapid valve, Tube Kit, Source Filler Cap, Source Tik-Cap, Weave-Covered Tube Kit, Replacement Inner Bag. The water bladders were later also picked up by the US Army (i.e. for the Iraq and Afghanistan campaigns).

In 2005, the company introduced the liquitainer, a foldable bottle and a variety of hydration packs featuring the widepac opening system, a patented system allowing a large opening to fill, clean and dry easily the bladder. New valves had been designed, such as the Z-valve and the Storm valve.

In 2008, Source entered the military hydration system market with the newly developed WXP hydration system.

From 2013 Source gained popularity in the Mountain Bike Hydration Packs market with a number of successful packs (i.e. the Hipster Hydration Belt placing the water bladder around the hip instead of on the rider's back).

Source Widepac Hydration Bladders are also used OEM in other brands' backpacks such as Deuter.

=== Virtus Soldier System ===
In 2015 SOURCE was awarded a multi-year contract by the British MoD to supply an initial quantity of 9000 personal protection and load carriage systems to the British Army. SOURCE Virtus Soldier System is a new fully integrated personal protection and load carriage system. First units are supplied from Fall 2015.

== Corporate social responsibility ==
Source donates 5% of the net profit to social or environmental activities in the nearby community. Source allocates 1% of its income to social and environmental projects through the SOURCE Give-One-Chance foundation.
