= Naot =

Israeli footwear company

- Founded: 1942
- Founder: Neot Mordechai
- Headquarters: Neot Mordechai, Israel
- Products: shoes, sandals
- Website: tevanaot.co.il naot.com

Teva Naot (Hebrew: טבע נאות) is an Israeli shoe and sandal manufacturer based at Kibbutz Neot Mordechai.

== History ==
Naot, which opened in 1942, started out as a small kibbutz factory producing work boots. Currently, it employs 160 workers and designs a new line of footwear every year to keep up with global fashion trends. Naot's products include a variety of shoes and sandals for men, women and children with special insoles that conform to the shape of the wearer's foot. Footbeds can be replaced by a user's custom orthotic insoles, or by standard replacements for worn ones.

In 1988, shoe manufacturing in Israel suffered from the glut of inexpensive imports from the Far East. Naot Mordechai considered shutting down its shoe factory. The economic situation of the kibbutz was so serious that it became part of a study of failing companies at the economics department of Tel Aviv University. Ami Bar-Nahor was assigned to be a consultant for Naot Mordechai as part of a class exercise. He came up with the idea of modernizing both the product and production to attract the new health-conscious shoe consumer. "I aimed at a sort of Israelization of Birkenstock,” said Bar-Nahor, referring to a well-known German footwear manufacturer. Bar-Nahor spent four years at Naot Mordechai. Traditional biblical sandals had inflexible soles; Naot used a flexible footbed of cork, natural rubber or leather. Adjustable leather straps allowed for swelling of the feet.

Bar-Nahor hired young designers from the Bezalel Academy of Arts and Design in Jerusalem and Shenkar College in Tel Aviv to add color and interest to the old style sandals produced mainly in beige, brown and black. In 2006 Shamrock Holdings, based in Burbank, California, paid US$31 million for the purchase of 66 percent of the enterprise.

In 2011 Teva Naot was targeted by Canadian protesters who said that the soles were manufactured in the controversial Gush Etzion West Bank settlements. In the wake of the protests, sales in the company's Canadian stores actually increased.

== International markets ==
Naot exports 80% of its production worldwide. Major markets include the United States (distributor: Yaleet Inc., Farmingdale, New York), Canada (distributor: Solemates Inc., Toronto, Ontario), Germany, UK and Australia. In 2011 Teva Naot's turnover in Canada was Can$20 million, with nine stores. Naot footwear is distributed in Europe by Naama Naot Germany, and AJJH Ltd., UK.

== See also ==
- Economy of Israel
- Israeli fashion
