= Hydration pack =

Portable water reservoir

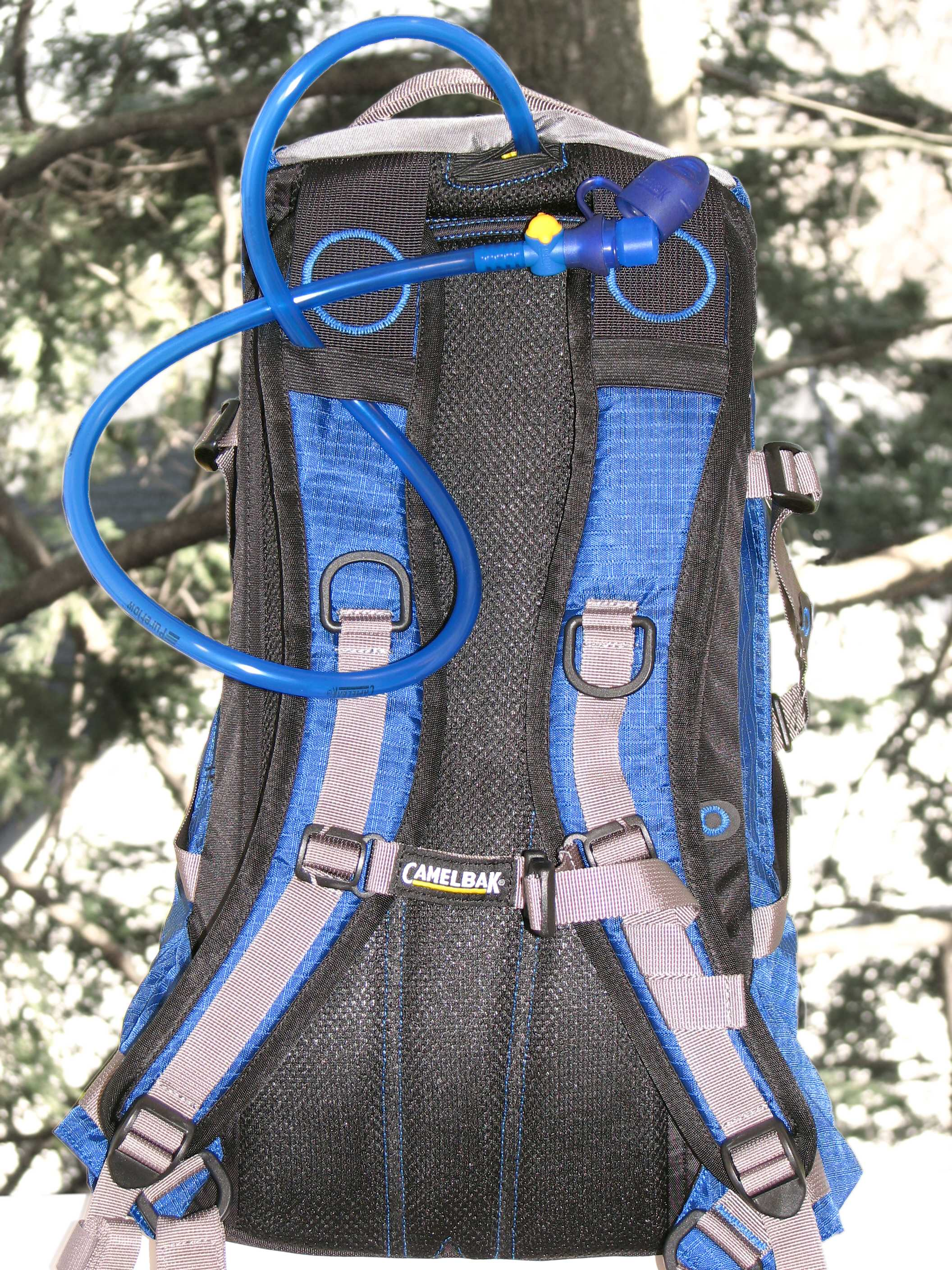
Hydration backpack

A hydration pack or drink bag is a type of hydration system built as a backpack or waistpack containing a reservoir or "bladder" commonly made of rubber or flexible plastic. The reservoir contains a capped mouth for filling with liquid and a hose that allows the wearer to drink hands-free. Most hoses end with a "bite valve" that opens when the user bites down on it; the valve may be protected by a dust cover. Some hydration packs are insulated to keep water from freezing or becoming warm.

An alternative product is a lightweight material vest with built in hydration system, generally known as a race or running hydration vest. Used by recreational to professional runners, providing a closer fit, with less likelihood of injury from pressure points - along with front stash pockets, and may include additional storage on the back.

== Uses ==
The volume of the reservoir and the pack carrying it can vary widely depending on the purpose of the hydration pack. Some packs are extremely small and minimalist, designed to add as little weight as possible and remain secure while running or cycling, while others are more suited for backpacking and extended hikes, equipped with much larger bladders. However, as water weighs 1 kilogram per litre (8.3 lb/US gal), it is impractical to carry more than a few liters in most situations; typical reservoirs are between 1–3 L (0.22–0.66 imp gal; 0.26–0.79 US gal), even for very large backpacks.

Besides hydration, water reservoirs may be used for washing dishes or equipment, or for showering. Pressurized hydration bladders are used in some cases to provide a stream powerful enough to effectively wash with, or the bladder may be suspended from a high place such as a tree branch to employ gravity in generating water pressure.

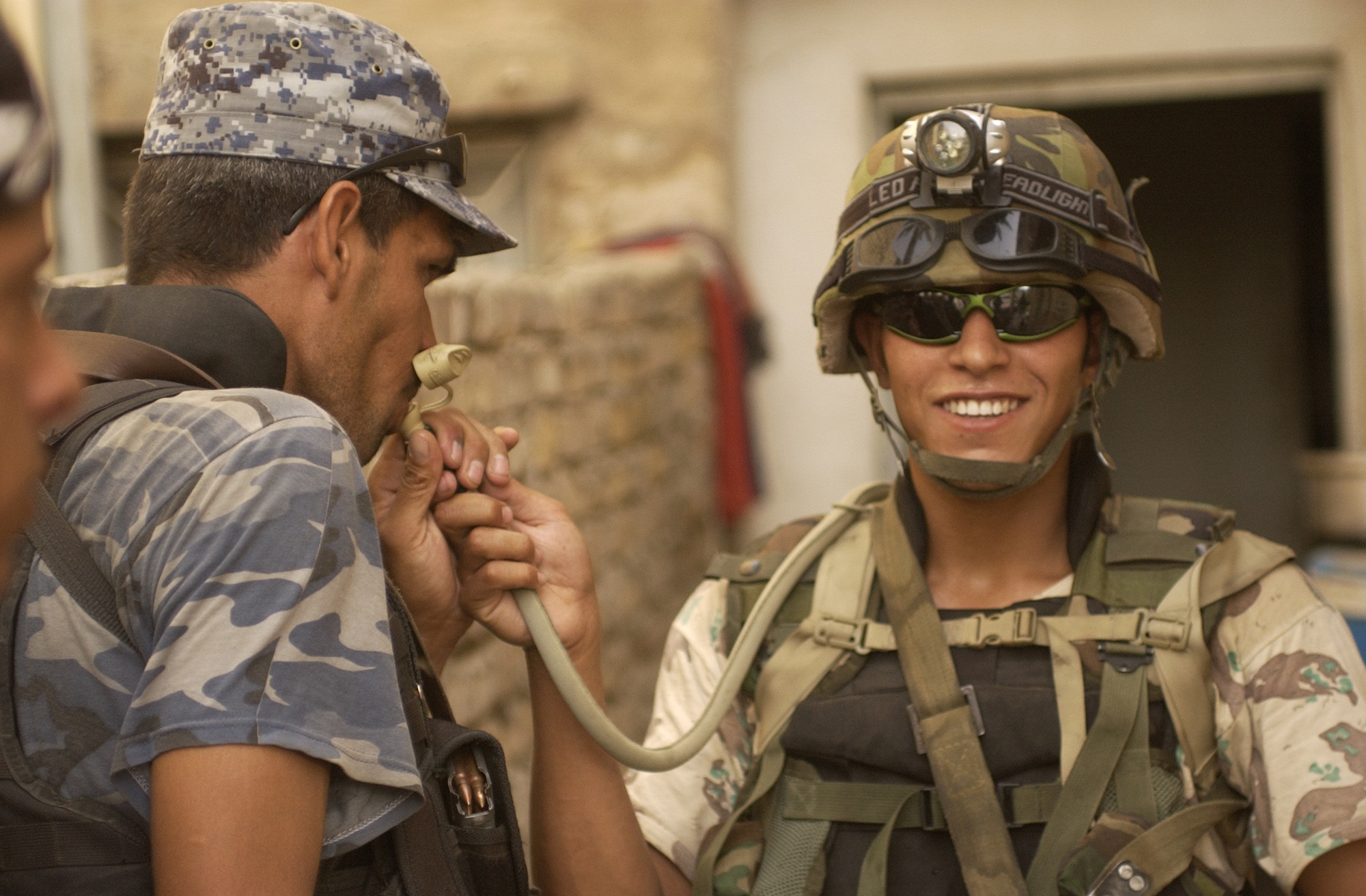
Iraqi soldier with "CamelBak" hydration system

Hydration packs are commonly used for outdoor recreational activities, such as hiking, bicycling, and kayaking, as well as for military maneuvers. Most field backpacks designed for backcountry or military use include accommodations for a user-supplied hydration bladder.

Due to hydration packs being airtight, they are widely used in CBRN protective situations with full face respirators allowing full mobility and fluid/nutrients supply—unlike canteens which must be held upside down. Additionally, there are acid- and chemical-resistant versions made for military and police use, such as the ''Camelbak Chem-Bio''.

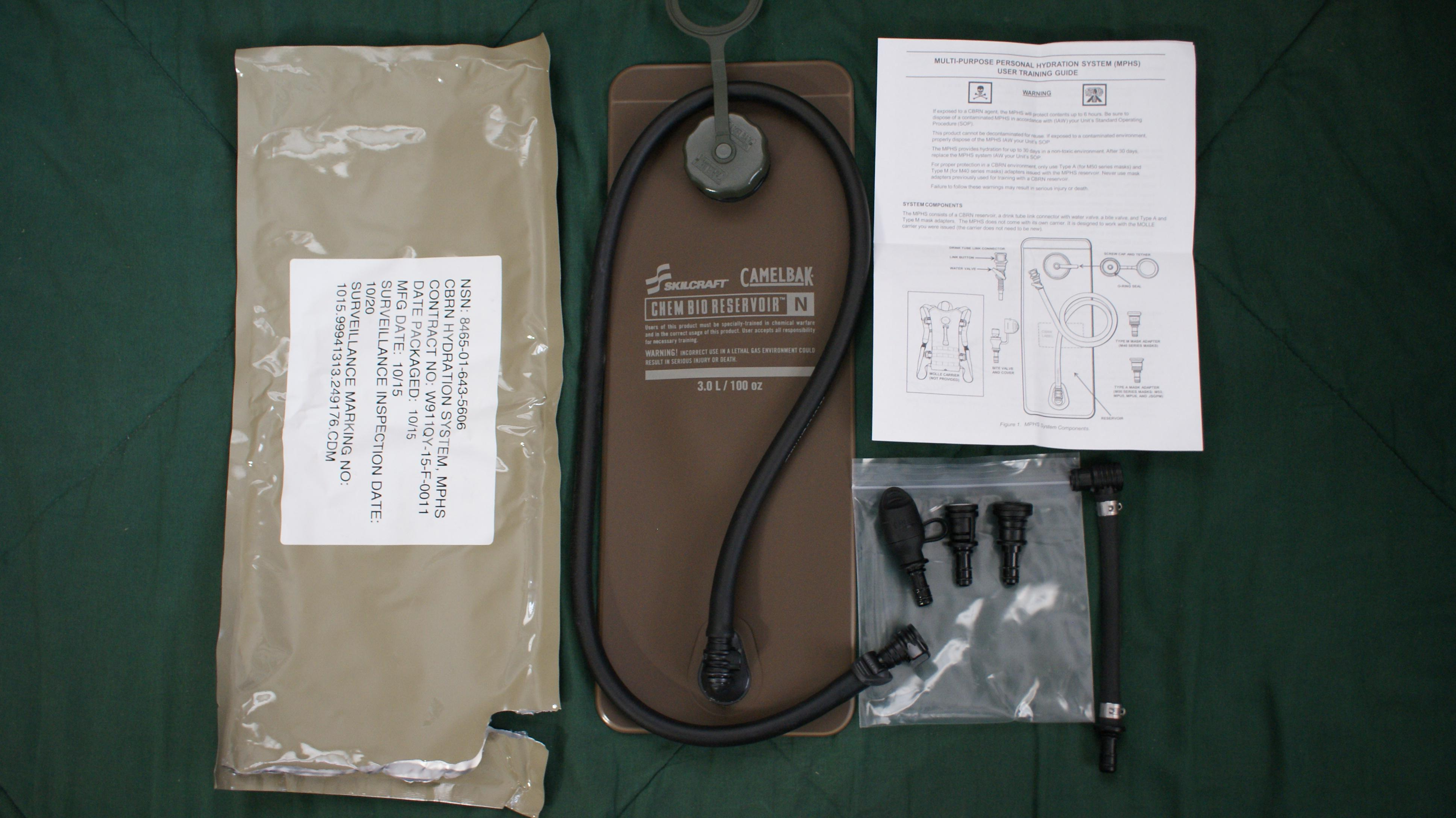
CBRN Version: Camelbak Chem-Bio Hydration Reservoir System, Standard Bite Valve, Type M (MSA), Type A (Avon), and Type S (Scott) Gas Mask Drinking Tube Adapters.

== Gallery ==
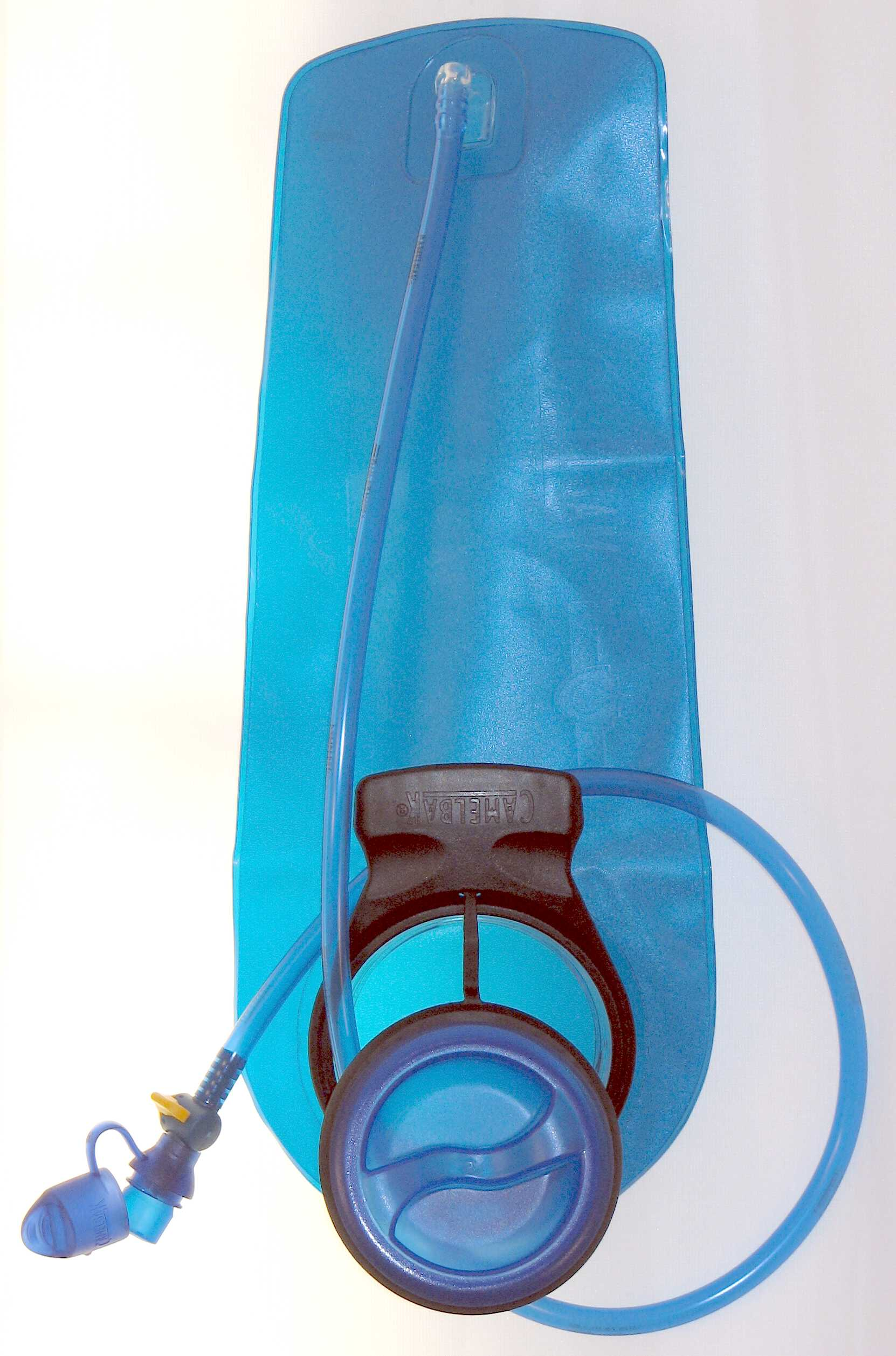
Hydration pack bladder with drinking tube and bite valve

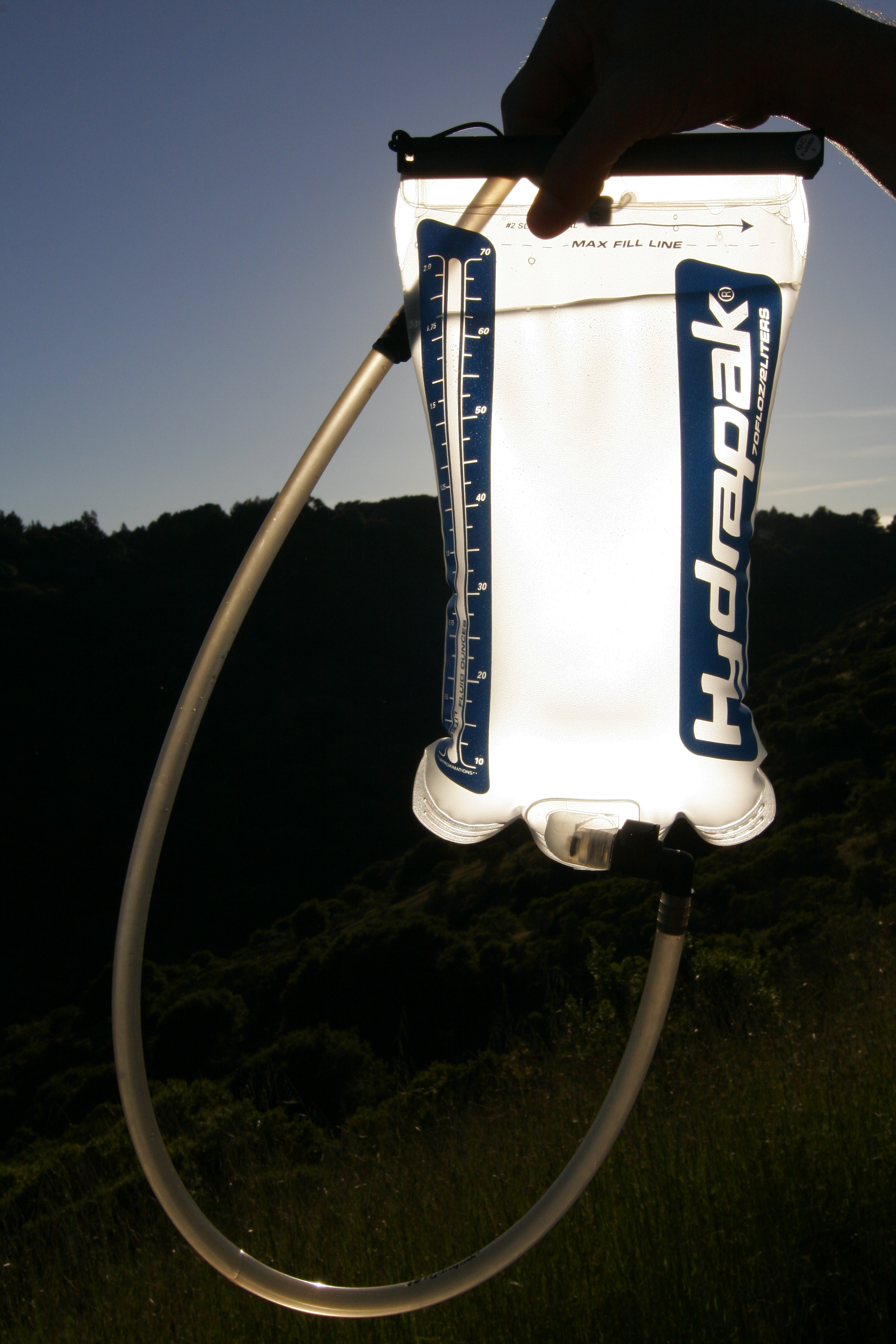
Hydrapak reservoir

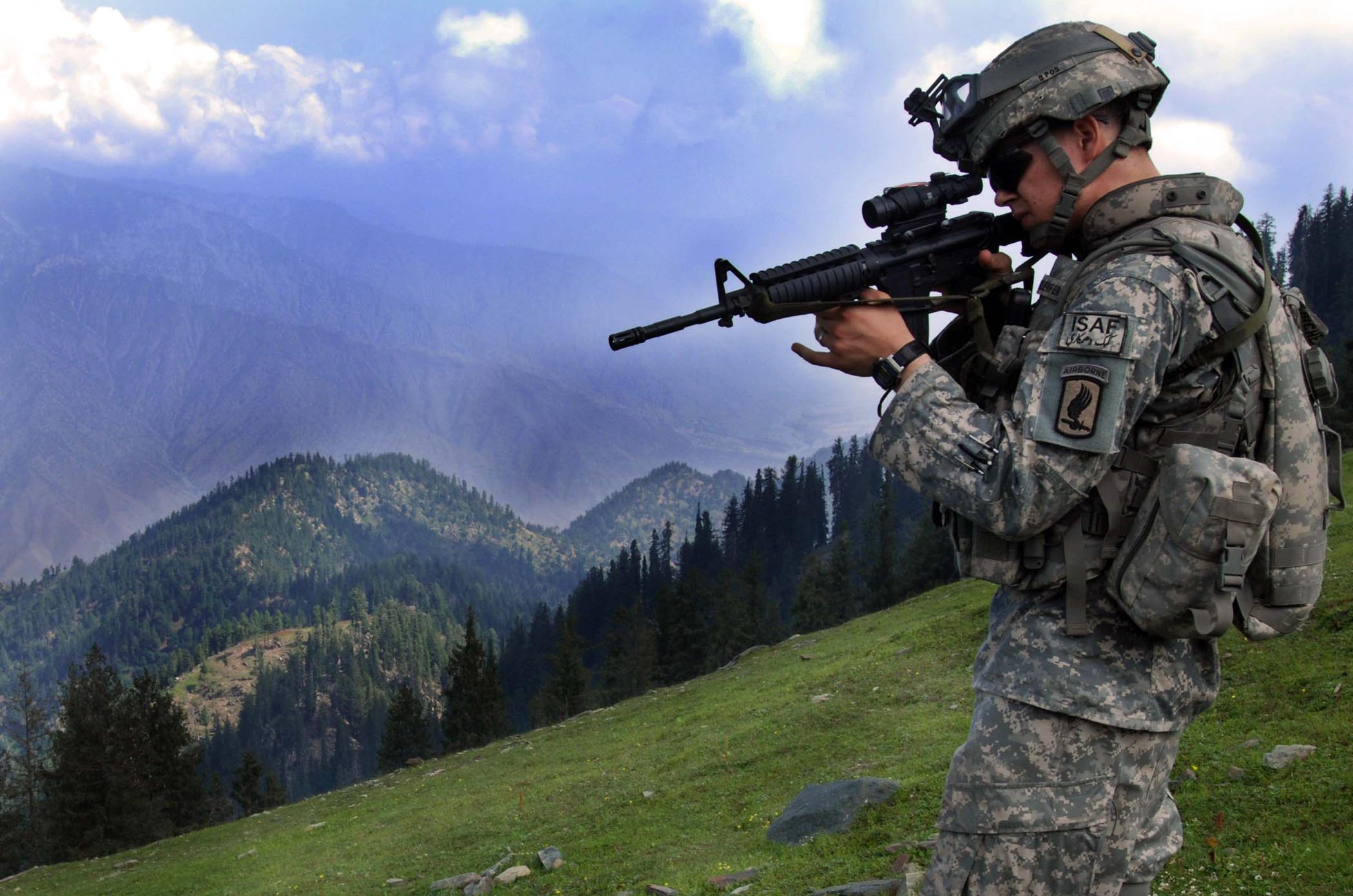
U.S. Army soldier wearing a hydration pack in Afghanistan

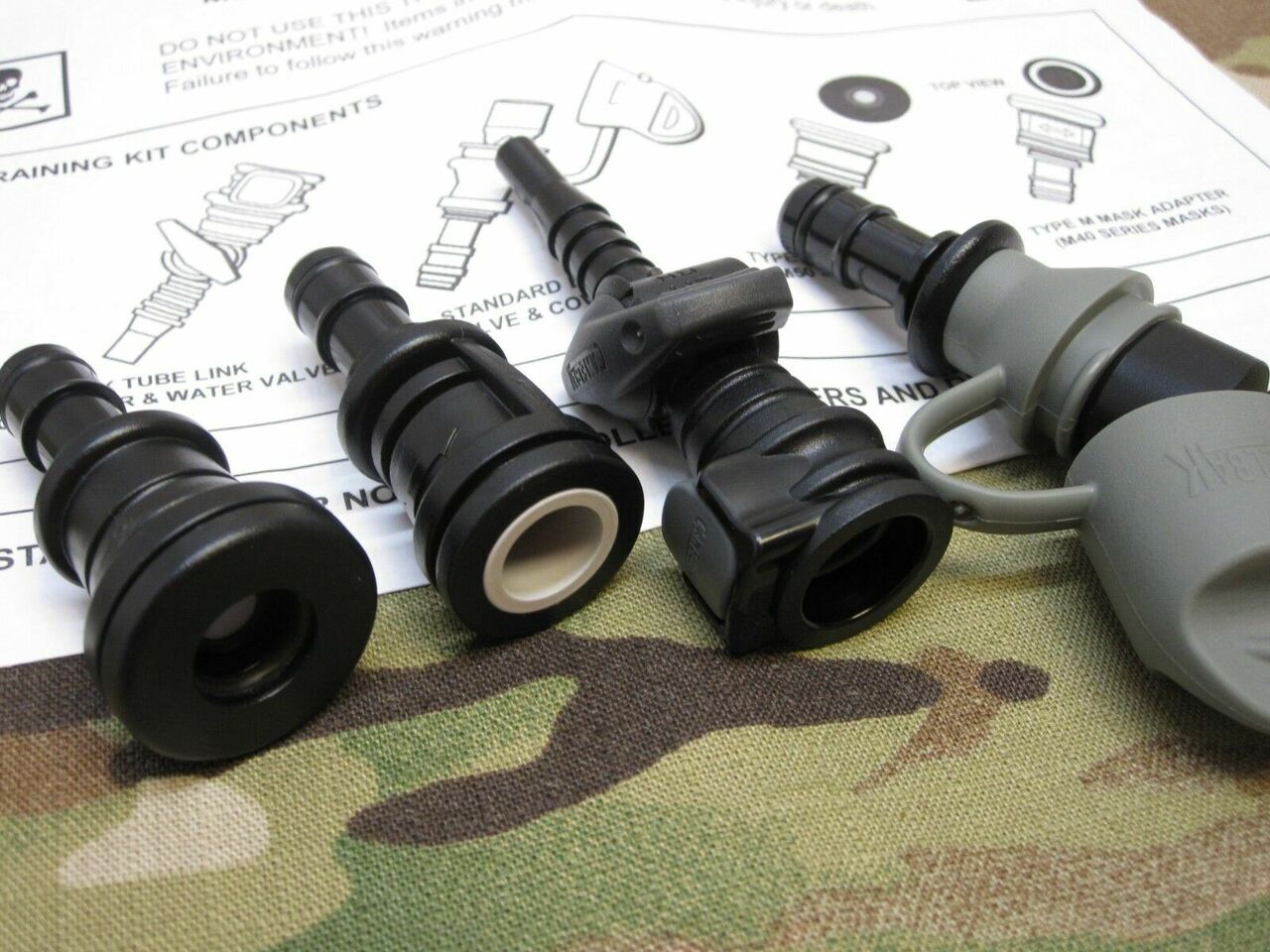
Type A (Avon), Type M (MSA), Tube to QDC, Bite Valve.

== See also ==
- CamelBak
- Hydrapak
- Source Vagabond Systems
- Hydrational fluids
