= Biblical sandals =

Footwear consisting of a sole with two leather ligaments

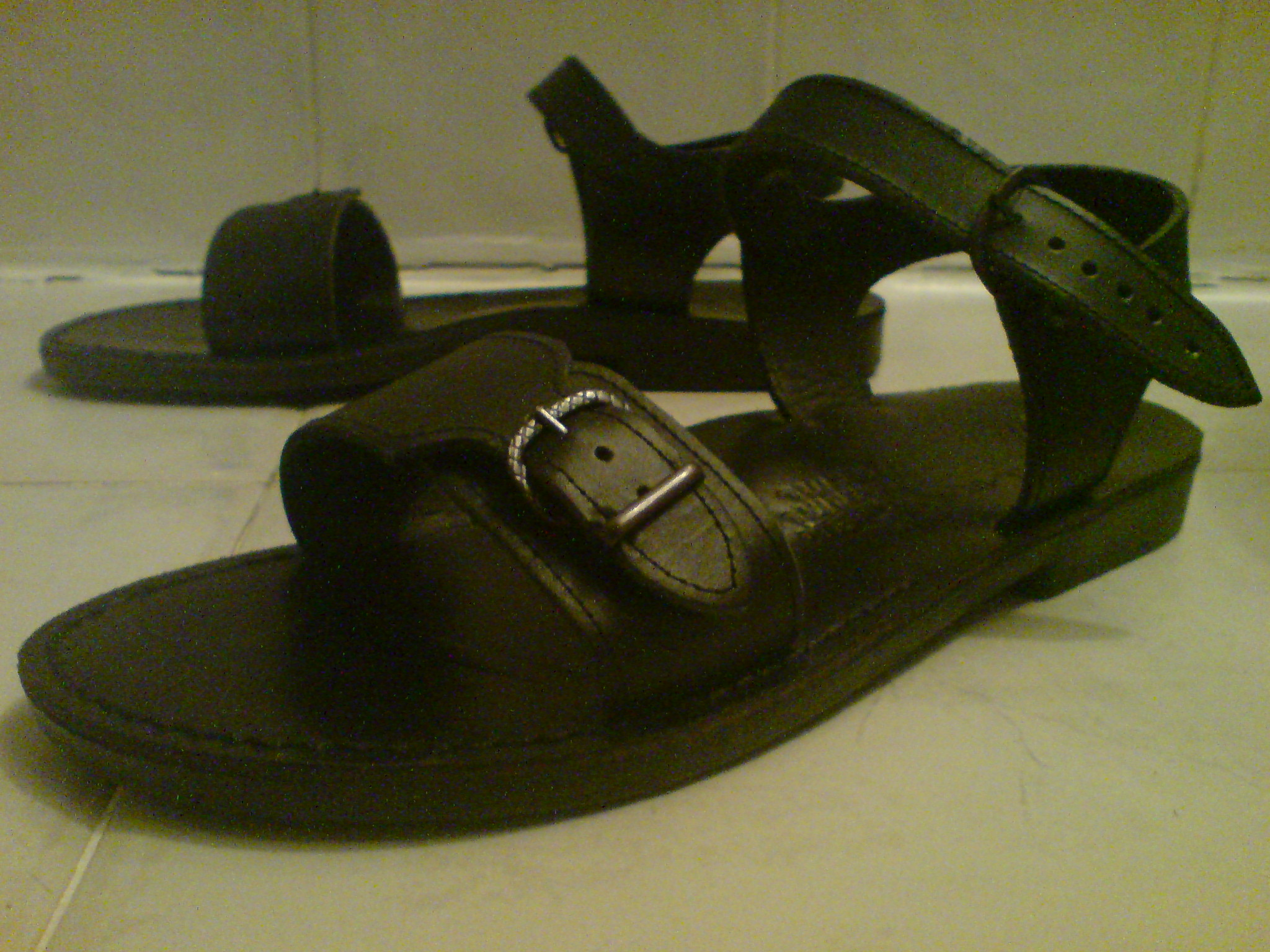
Biblical sandals.

Biblical sandals (Hebrew: סנדלים תנ"כיים, sandalim tanakhim), also called Tanakhi sandals and Khugistic sandals (Hebrew: סנדלים חוגיסטיים, sandalim ḥugistim), are sandals consisting of a sole with two leather straps that pass across the top of the foot, and one around the heel. The leather is usually brown or black. The term is widely used by manufacturers in Israel.

== History ==
In ancient times those sandals were made of non-processed leather and dry grass, and had strings or ropes made of simple, cheap materials, though sometimes golden or silver beads and even gems were added.

In modern times, Biblical sandals are a symbol of Zionism. Israeli pioneers and Israeli born Jews used them to show the return to the clothing worn by the ancestors, and fit the climate. The harsh economic situation of the Zionists before the establishment of Israel, and of the Israelis in the 1940s to the 1960s, including the period of austerity in Israel, made those low-cost sandals a part of the proud-poor countryside or kibbutz fashion. The style contrasted with the more ostentatious attire of the city inhabitants who were European-influenced. Later, the city inhabitants started wearing these sandals too, especially after their popularization by Nimrod Shoes in Tel Aviv.

Notable modern manufacturers known for making Biblical sandals include Shoresh and Teva Naot. The sandals are also sometimes worn by members of the Knesset, Israel's parliament, while the Knesset is in session.

An exhibit on Biblical sandals and Israeli culture was opened at the Eretz Israel Museum in July 2018.

== See also ==
- List of shoe styles
- Tembel hat
- Israeli fashion
- Culture of Israel
