= Neot Mordechai =

Place in Northern Israel

Neot Mordechai: נאות מרדכי (Hebrew)
- Kibbutz
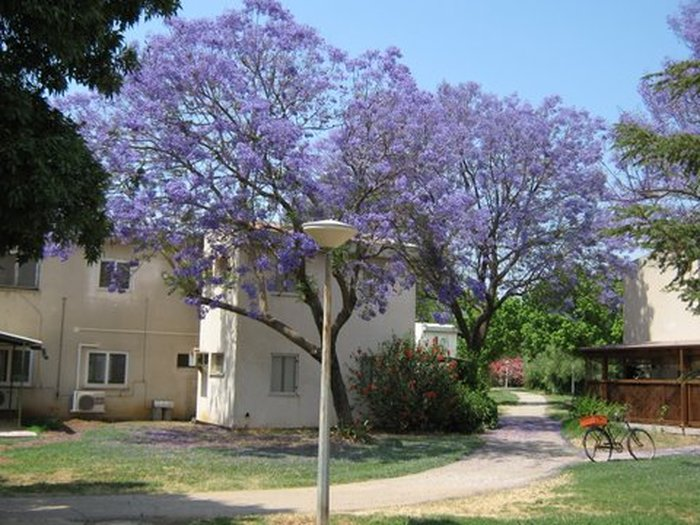
- Etymology: Abodes of Mordechai
- Location within Northeast Israel Location within Israel
- Coordinates: 33°9′36″N 35°35′48″E
- Country: Israel
- District: Northern
- Subdistrict: Safed
- Council: Upper Galilee
- Affiliation: Kibbutz Movement
- Founded: 2 November 1946
- Founder: Czechoslovak, German and Austrian Jews
- Population (2024): 706
- Website: neot.org.il

Neot Mordechai (Hebrew: נאות מרדכי, lit. 'Abodes of Mordechai') is a kibbutz in northern Israel. Located in the Upper Galilee, it falls under the jurisdiction of Upper Galilee Regional Council. In 2024 it had a population of 706.

== History ==
The kibbutz was established on 2 November 1946 by immigrants from Czechoslovakia, Germany and Austria. It was named in honour of Mordechai Rozovsky, a Zionist activist in Argentina. Aside from agriculture, the kibbutz is the home of Teva Naot, a shoe factory with branches all over Israel.

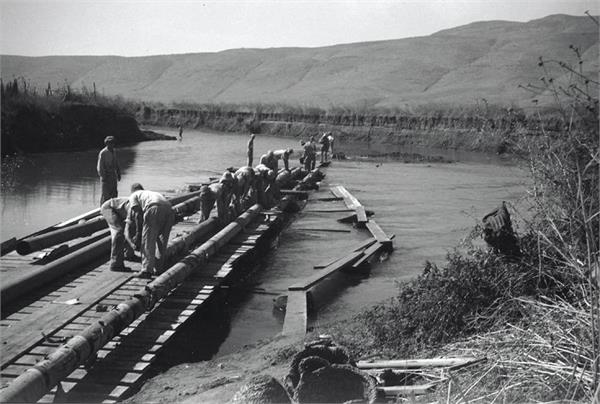
Neot Mordechai building access bridge across Jordan River, 1946

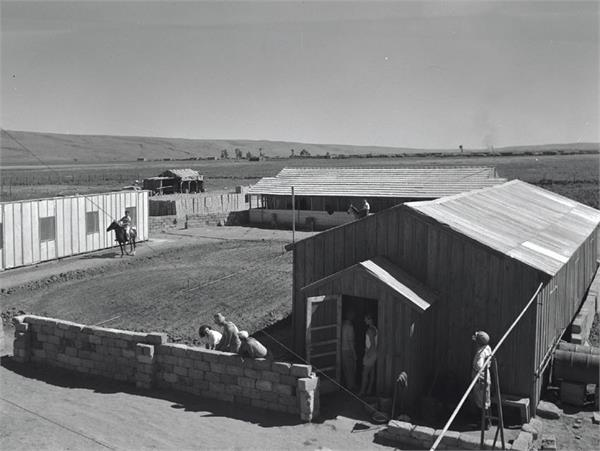
Neot Mordechai, 1947

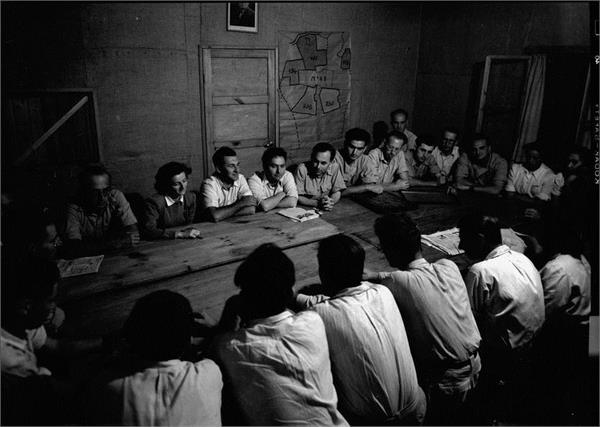
Neot Mordechai members, 1947

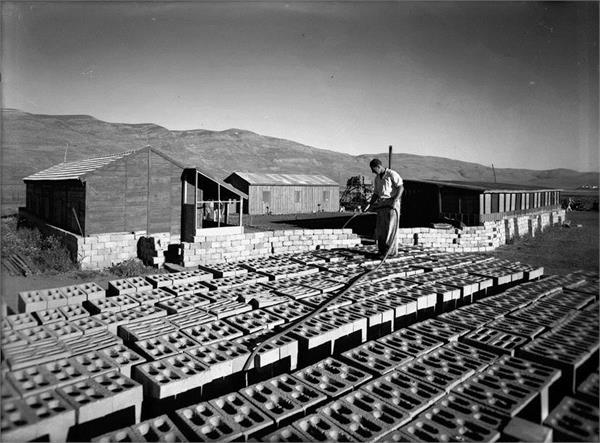
Neot Mordechai 1947

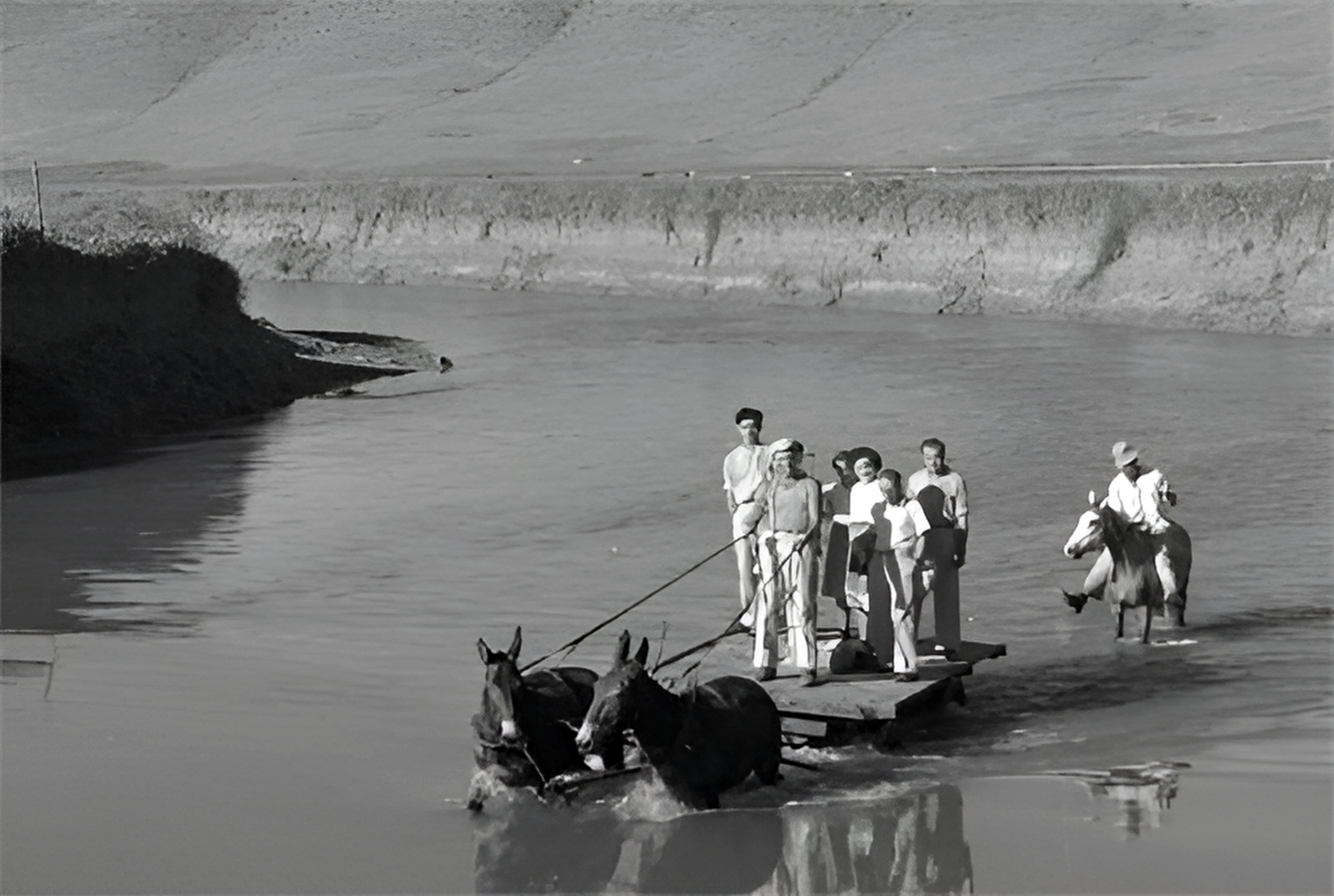
Neot Mordechai, 1947

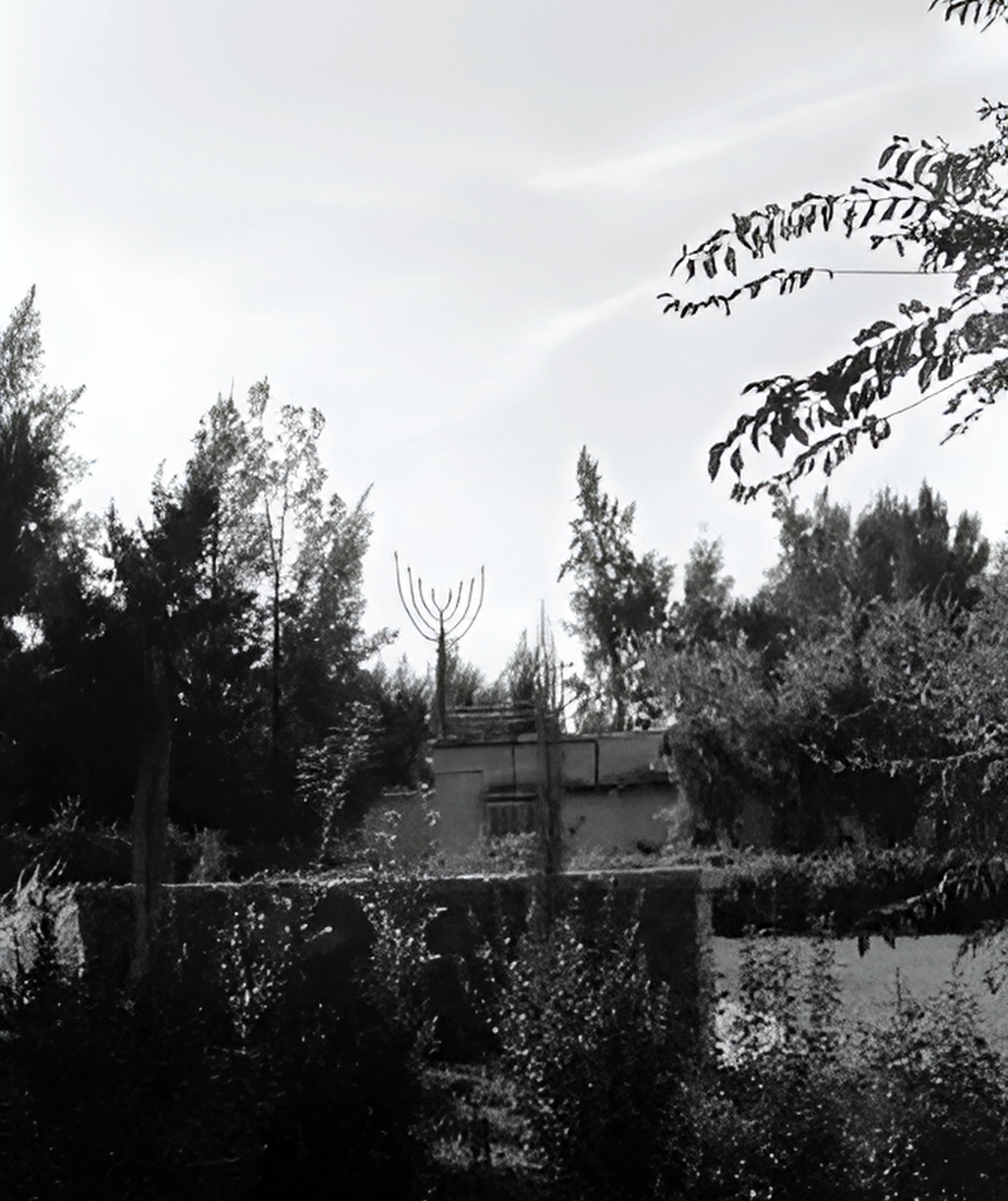
Neot Mordechai, 1963
