= Tissue hydration =

Tissue hydration is the process of absorbing and retaining water in biological tissues.

== Plants ==
Land plants maintain adequate tissue hydration by means of an outer waterproof layer. In soft or green tissues, this is usually a waxy cuticle over the outer epidermis. In older, woody tissues, waterproofing chemicals are present in the secondary cell wall that limit or inhibit the flow of water. Vascular plants also possess an internal vascular system that distributes fluids throughout the plant.

Some xerophytes, such as cacti and other desert plants, have mucilage in their tissues. This is a sticky substance that holds water within the plant, reducing the rate of dehydration. Some seeds and spores remain dormant until adequate moisture is present, at which time the seed or spore begins to germinate.

== Animals ==
Animals maintain adequate tissue hydration by means of (1) an outer skin, shell, or cuticle; (2) a fluid-filled coelom cavity; and (3) a circulatory system.

Hydration of fat free tissues, ratio of total body water to fat free body mass, is stable at 0.73 in mammals.

In humans, a significant drop in tissue hydration can lead to the medical condition of dehydration. This may result from loss of water itself, loss of electrolytes, or a loss of blood plasma. Administration of hydrational fluids as part of sound dehydration management is necessary to avoid severe complications, and in some cases, death.

Some invertebrates are able to survive extreme desiccation of their tissues by entering a state of cryptobiosis.

== See also ==
- Osmoregulation
