= Hydration system =

Device to provide oral liquids

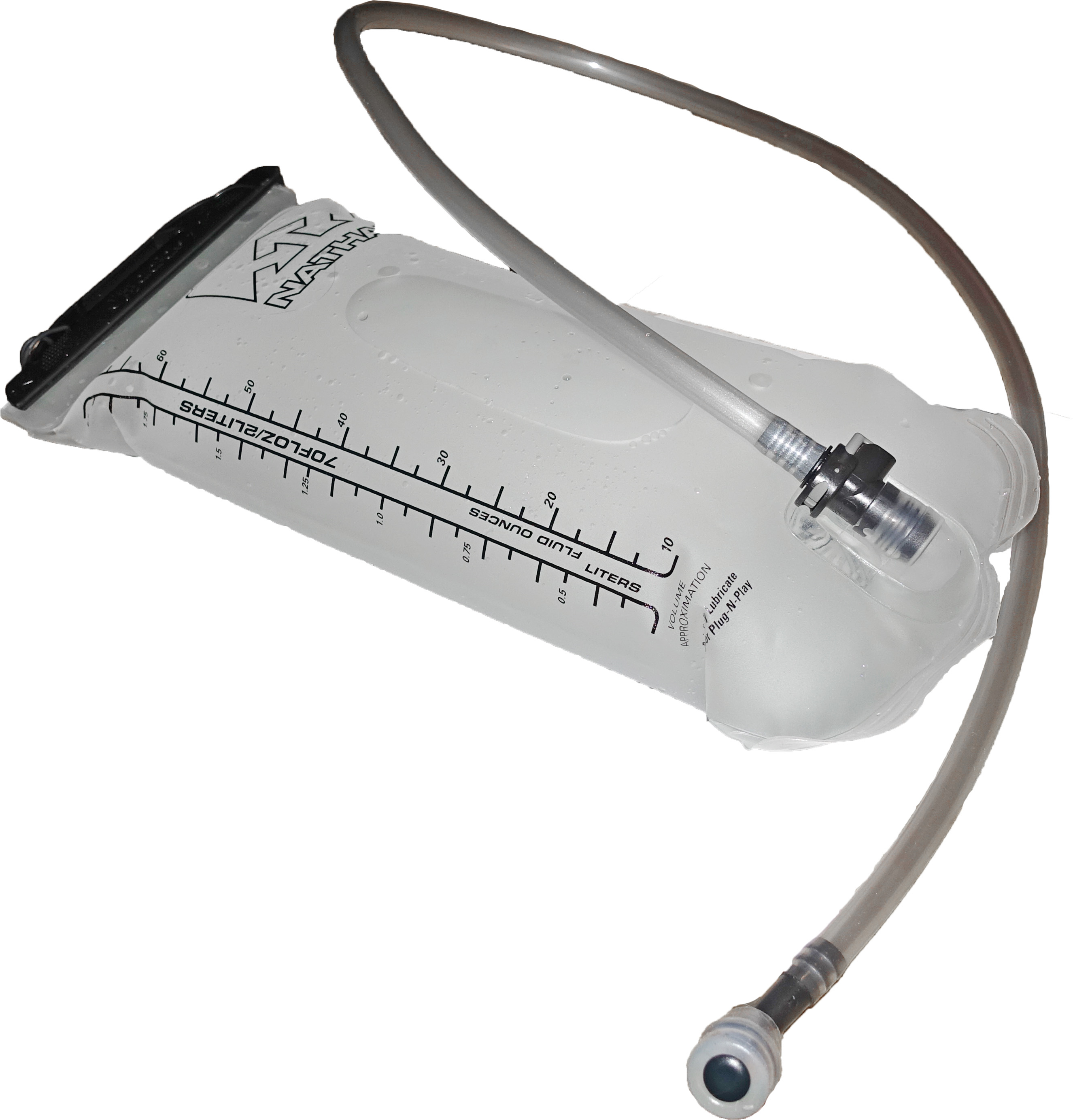
"Bare Bladder" model with hose and bite valve

A hydration system is an apparatus used in recreation and other sustained outdoor activities. It is intended to help its user carry liquid, to support the physical effort involved in the activity, without the need to use one's hands or take off the pack. Such systems for consumers were first sold to cyclists, and by the 1990s had also found a substantial market among hikers. Familiar commercial models can also be recognized occasionally worn by western military personnel in southwest Asia.

In practice, such a system is almost always a commercially manufactured unit that features at least

- a flexible bladder of one or a few liters' (quarts') capacity with some means, usually a screwtop, to fill and then reliably seal it,
- a light hose to convey the beverage to the user's mouth, and
- a bite valve that starts and stops the flow through the hose with minimal effort.

Also common are designs that include specific hands-free means to comfortably carry the hydration system.

== History ==
The plastic bladders from box wine were repurposed as an inexpensive way to store water when hiking in Australia in the late 1960s but were prone to breakage and leakage. Hydration systems first appeared commercially in the late 1980s or early 1990s, at backpacking stores. They were adopted by US special operations troops in the early 1990s, and became standard issue for all US troops in the later 1990s.

The concept of the hydration system appeared in Robert A. Heinlein's 1955 novel, Tunnel in the Sky, where the main character has "a belt canteen of flexible synthetic divided into half-liter pockets. The weight was taken by shoulder straps and a tube ran up the left suspender, ending in a nipple near his mouth, so that he might drink without taking it off."

== Hardware ==
=== Bladder designs ===
The overall geometry of the bladder is nearly universal:

- The largest dimension is the vertical one, taking advantage of the long vertical dimension of the human torso.
- The hose joins the bladder very near the bottom of the bladder, to maximize the amount of accessible liquid.
- The bladder's change in volume as it is gradually emptied is reflected in the decrease of its smallest dimension (thickness); this lets the vertical and side-to-side dimensions stay fixed, thereby limiting the shifting of it and any items next to it, and minimizes the flexing of the bladder walls.

=== Packaging ===
Typical commercial hydration systems are available with three fundamental approaches:

- A "bare bladder", intended to be carried in a matching pocket of a "hydration-system compatible" backpack. (Such a pack will usually also feature a hole through the pack, near the upper anchoring point of the pack's shoulder straps, sized for the hose and bite valve to pass through it, and often covered by a flap that prevents rain entering the pack through it.)
- As part of an integrated design incorporating both a backpack and the hydration system (usually sold together as a hydration pack), usually with at least a few pockets-worth of storage space for other items. (Such a combination is likely to have a channel inside one or both shoulder straps, for the hose to pass through, preventing the hose from tangling with other gear or the environment, and ameliorating the annoyance of the liquid warming up while waiting in the hose to be drunk next, or the problem of it freezing.)
- A basic hydration system in a protective fabric shell, so that the bladder is unlikely to be damaged by other gear that it shares the interior of an ordinary pack with. (The CamelBak brand products of this kind are trademarked as "The Unbottle", for instance, and each looks a lot like a very small pack, with a hand-carrying strap at the top and four D-rings that could facilitate attaching it to the outside of a pack. However, they completely lack shoulder or waist straps.)

=== Accessories ===
Some manufacturers offer parts for replacement or customization, whether compatible only with their own hydration systems, or usable also with others'.

=== Plumbing ===
==== Shut-off valves ====
Especially while a hydration system is being carried in a vehicle, there is some danger of the bite valve being squeezed, opening it to leakage or a steady flow; this can be guarded against with an additional valve, usually installed between the bite valve and the hose, that stays open or closed according to the position of a lever.

==== Elbows ====
The bite valve may be installed with a right-angle extension between it and the hose, to achieve a preferred positioning and angle of the valve relative to the user's mouth.

==== Hose anchors ====
Position and angle may also be adjusted by clips that clip usually to a pack strap and (for instance by clipping to the hose, or looping around it and snapping to themselves to close the loop) control the hose's path

=== Insulation ===
==== Hose ====
Plastic foam surrounding the hose can be used to reduce heat transfer between the environment and liquid in the hose: keeping a cold liquid cool longer in summer and slows a liquid freezing in winter.

==== Bite valve ====
At least one manufacturer offers a tethered, slip-off, foam cowl that slows freezing of the liquid in the bite valve, and also reduces contamination of the bite valve.

=== Filters ===
At least one manufacturer, MSR, offers a in-line ceramic based filter, allowing use of local water supplies for refill. Ceramic filters can be cleaned at home by back flushing with clean water so no replacements are needed.

=== Between fillings ===
==== Scrubbing systems ====
Sets of cylindrical brushes (e.g., a large one for the inside of the bladder, and a thin one with a flexible handle long enough to run at least halfway through the hose) permit mechanical removal of biofilm that will grow on the surface inside the system.

==== Drying systems ====
Means of holding the bladder walls apart to encourage drying between uses are available, such as a plastic frame that collapses to pass through the fill opening, but expands inside the bladder to hold the sides apart even near the corners.

== Techniques ==
Various specialized practices may be applied in using a hydration system.

- Depending on the size of the opening for filling the bladder, it may be convenient to include, in hot weather, ice cubes or crushed ice when filling it. In theory too much ice means running out of liquid water while the bladder still has ice occupying space that could have been filled by more water (so it helps to take account of how temperature and humidity affect the balance between consumption rate and melting rate), but it helps that most people's tendency seems to be to put in less ice than would last through the hike.
- The use of liquids that provide calories (usually in combination with flavoring and perhaps rehydration salts) increases the cleaning burden by nourishing bacteria, and if the user neglects to empty and rinse the bladder, judging the cleanliness of the bladder at a later date involves more effort than with containers that are more transparent and in some cases more accessible. Some users carry plain water, with or without ice, in a bladder, but drink something else from Nalgene-style bottles during rests.
- On trips over a day, or in especially hot conditions, need for more water than is carried may require purification of local water.
  - Attention to mechanical compatibility of a filtration system with the bladder, or with a Nalgene-style bottle that may be carried to fill the bladder, can be worthwhile.
  - Use of chemical purification systems raises issues both of staining of the bladder and the possibility of weakening its material. Besides the aesthetic discomfort of drinking from a perfectly sterile but "dirty looking" bladder, staining can also interfere with judging later the cleanliness of a bladder.
- Another way to ensure the bladder does not start a breakout of microbes is to let out as much water as possible from it, and freeze it as soon as possible. This technique makes use of the property that microbes cannot propagate under freezing conditions.

=== Clearing the hose between drinks ===
Two views exist on the practice of blowing air back through the bite valve, to force the liquid out of the hose and back into the bladder.

- Advocates point out that liquid in the hose (where it is all within 3/16 inch (4.8 mm) of the air) warms or cools relatively rapidly toward the ambient temperature, and value the reduction of this when nearly all the liquid is in the bladder. There it is as much as several inches (10 cm) from the bladder surface, and it may be still further insulated by a pack and its other contents. When the air temperature is below freezing if the hose isn't cleared it can rapidly freeze blocking the hose. This often occurs skiing where high wind speed and low temperatures are combined.
- Detractors believe that blowing into the hose increases the amount of oral bacteria inside the bladder, and requires more frequent scrubbing to keep the flavor and odor of the contents acceptable.
- Because the hose attaches to the bottom of the bladder, in order to let the last of the liquid into the hose, air that reaches the opening bubbles to the top of the bladder, and is trapped there until the liquid is nearly drained. Each time more air is blown into the bladder than the amount of liquid contained inside the hose, the pressure inside the bladder increases, and the more effort blowing back involves. Therefore, the technique profits from enough attention to develop a sense of when the hose is nearly full of air.

== See also ==
- Hydration (disambiguation)
- Hydrational fluid
