= Dehydration (disambiguation) =

Dehydration is the excessive loss of body water.

Dehydration or water loss may also refer to other cases of water loss/removal (sometimes colloquially):

- Drying, the removal of water through chemical or physical means
  - Desiccation, sometimes synonymous with drying, sometimes an extreme form of it
  - Food drying, food preservation by dehydration
- Dehydration reaction, a chemical reaction
- Dryness (medical) of skin, etc.

== See also ==
- Dehydrogenation
