= Zisser =

Zisser is a surname. Notable people with the surname include:

- Michael Zisser (born 1966), Austrian footballer and manager
- Nela Zisser (born 1992), New Zealand model
- Stefan Zisser (born 1980), Italian ice hockey player
- Ruti Zisser (born 1974), Israeli American designer
- Yuri Zisser (1960–2020), Belarusian businessman
