= Project Runway Israel =

- Proyekt Maslul Official logo
- No. of tasks: 11
- No. of contestants: 13
- Winner: Alon Livne
- No. of episodes: 13

Release
- Original release: June 17, 2009 – October 2009

Proyekt Maslul (Hebrew: פרויקט מסלול) is the Israeli version of the American reality show Project Runway.

== History ==
Proyekt Maslul was filmed during the winter of 2008–2009 and premiered on June 17, 2009. The show featured 13 Israeli designers competing to become "the next big fashion designer". The winner was Alon Livne.

The show was hosted by Shiraz Tal, an Israeli model. It ran for one season.

== Season 1 contestants ==
The 13 Designers are:

Contestant	Age	Hometown	Notes
Ten Tao Le	28	Bat Yam, Israel	Eliminated episode 1
Maria Berman	29	Tel Aviv, Israel	Eliminated episode 2
Ofir Peretz	26	Haifa, Israel	Eliminated episode 3
Netanel Zikri	25	Ramat Gan, Israel	Eliminated episode 4
Michal Tik	30	Kfar Adumim, West Bank	Eliminated episode 5
Yoav Meir	27	Tel Aviv, Israel	Eliminated episode 6
Nir Huga	30	Jerusalem, Israel	Brother of Meshie, eliminated episode 7
Moran Tawil	26	New York, New York	Eliminated episode 8
Guy Finkelstein	30	London, England	Husband of Maya, eliminated episode 9
Meshie Huga	23	Bat Yam, Israel	Sister of Nir, eliminated episode 10
Lucy David	34	Jaffa, Israel	Third place
Maya Amrami-Finkelstein	33	London, England	Wife of Guy, Runner-up
Alon Livne	24	Tel Aviv, Israel	Winner

== Season 1 challenges ==
Designer Elimination Chart
Designer	1	2	3	4	5	6	7	8	9	10	11
Alon	HIGH	HIGH	WIN	IN	LOW	WIN	HIGH	LOW	LOW	WIN	WINNER
Lucy	WIN	IN	IN	HIGH	HIGH	LOW	WIN	LOW	HIGH	OUT	OUT
Maya	IN	HIGH	IN	WIN	IN	HIGH	LOW	HIGH	WIN	LOW	OUT
Meshie	LOW	IN	IN	HIGH	WIN	HIGH	HIGH	HIGH	LOW	LOW	OUT
Guy	IN	LOW	HIGH	IN	HIGH	LOW	LOW	WIN	OUT		
Moran	IN	WIN	HIGH	IN	IN	HIGH	LOW	OUT			
Michal	LOW	IN	IN	IN	LOW	LOW	OUT				
Yoav	HIGH	IN	LOW	LOW	LOW	OUT					
Nir	IN	IN	IN	LOW	OUT						
Netanel	IN	LOW	LOW	OUT							
Ofir	IN	IN	OUT								
Maria	IN	OUT									
Tao	OUT										

Light blue background and HIGH means the designer had one of the highest scores
Green background and WINNER means the designer won Project Runway.
Blue background and WIN means the designer won the challenge.
Red background and OUT means the designer was eliminated.
Pink background and LOW means the designer was in the bottom 3, but was not eliminated.
Orange background and LOW means the designer was in the bottom 2, but was not eliminated.

== Episode 1 ==
The premiere episode of Project Runway Israel showed host Shiraz Tal introducing the thirteen designers. The designers were given their first challenge: design a dress inspired by one of Rita Kleinstein's songs. The designers made their way to their new home and studio where they began to work. At the studio, drama occurred when Meshie found it hard to design her dress and asked for help. When contestants helped her, she caused trouble and they got mad at her for her poor attitude. At the end of the 48-hour time limit, the models walked the runway in front of the judges. Tao disappointed the judges and was eliminated.

- Judges: Vei Bleish, Sason Kedem, Shiraz Tal, Gal Afel
- Guest Judge: Rita Kleinstein
- WINNER: Lucy
- OUT: Tao
- First Aired: June 17, 2009

== Episode 2 ==
During the 2nd episode, the designers went to a stall shop in Jaffa, Israel. They had a quick challenge to pick out the ugliest clothing they could find. Yoav won the challenge. The designers were then given their challenge: to design a sexy undergarment from the ugly clothing they had taken from the stalls for Hadas & Inbal, former contestants (a.k.a. The Blondes) from the reality TV show HaMerotz LaMillion to wear in a fashion magazine. Guy failed to design, and reconstructed his underwear several times. Moran got frustrated when she couldn't find the correct materials to finish her dress. Moran won the challenge. The weakest three were Guy, Maria, and Netanel, who didn't manage to create a beautiful underwear garment. Guy and Maria landed in the bottom two, but Guy was given another chance and Maria was sent home.

- Judges: Gal Afel, Shiraz Tal
- Guest Judge(s): Hadas & Inbal, unknown guest designer.
- WINNER: Moran
- OUT: Maria
- First Aired: June 24, 2009.

== Episode 3 ==
In the third episode, the designers were given a challenge to create a dress out of fabrics from a local supermarket. Everyone was working hard on their own dresses, except Yoav, who helped other people and neglected his own dress. Alon won his first challenge while Yoav and Ofir landed in the bottom two. Ofir was sent home.

- Judges: Vei Bleish, Shiraz Tal, Gal Afel
- Guest Judge: None
- WINNER: Alon
- OUT: Ofir
- First Aired: July 1, 2009.

== See also ==
- Israeli fashion
- Television in Israel
