= Israeli fashion =

Overview of fashion in Israel

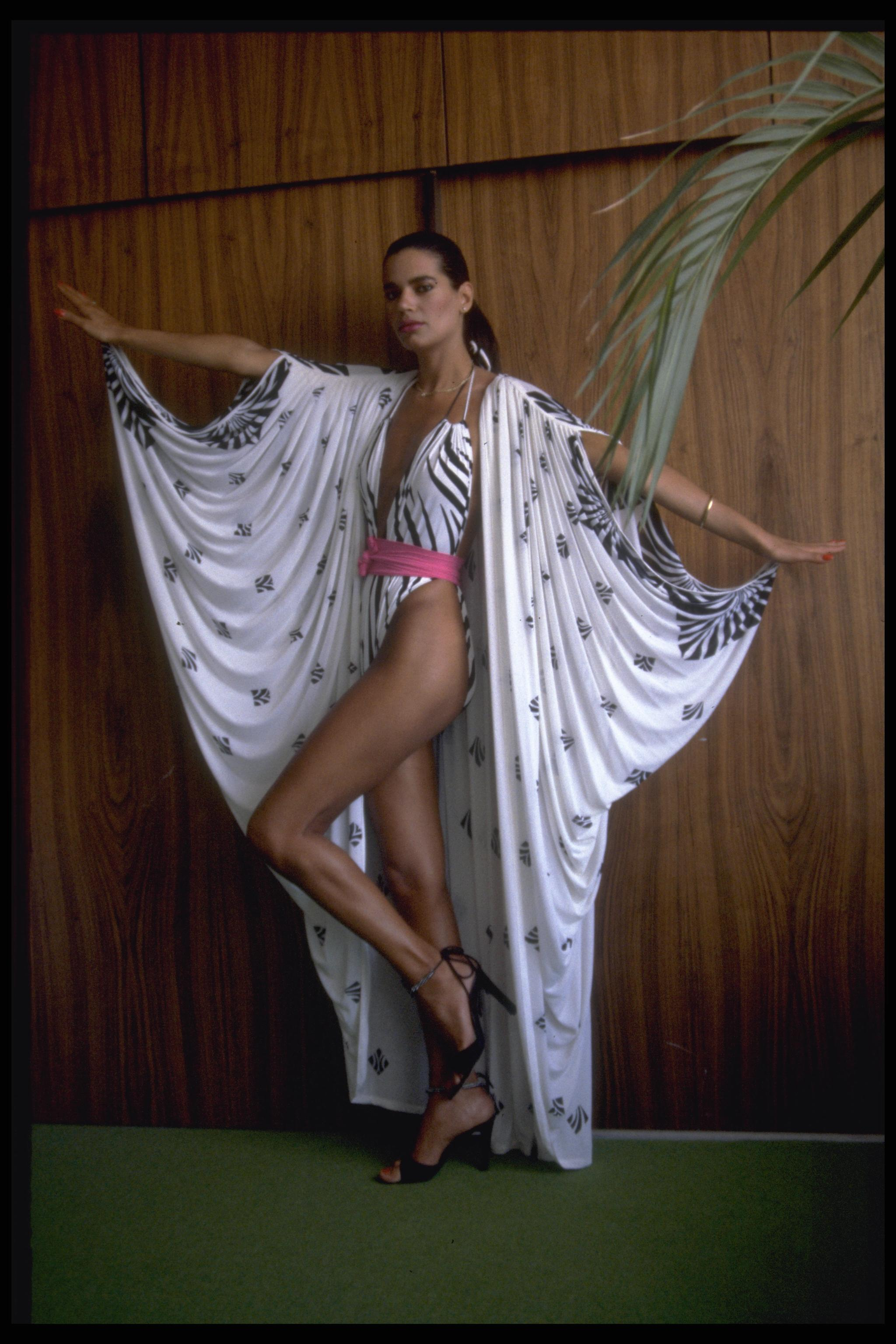
Israeli model Tami Ben-Ami modelling a Gottex swimsuit

Israeli fashion refers to fashion design and modeling in Israel.

Israel has become an international center of fashion and design. Tel Aviv has been called the "next hot destination" for fashion. Israeli designers show their collections at leading fashion shows, including New York Fashion Week. Israeli fashion continues to receive international media coverage and recognition, with designers and fashion events regularly featured in global publications.

== History ==
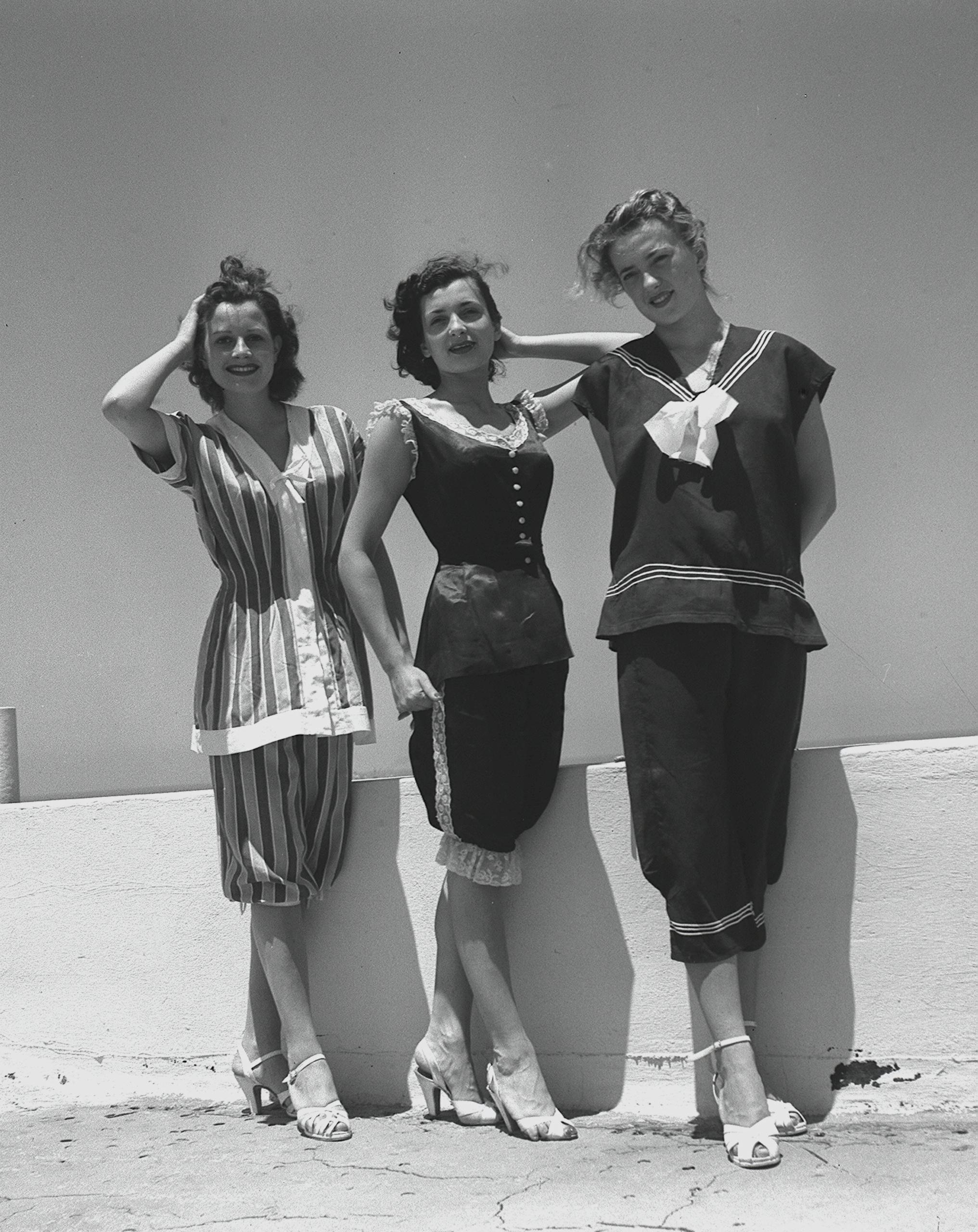
Israeli models in the 1950s

The ATA textile factory was founded in Kfar Ata in 1934 by Erich Moller, a Jewish industrialist from Czechoslovakia. ATA specialized in work clothes and uniforms, reflecting the Zionist and socialist ideology of the time. Factory production spanned every aspect of garment-making, from thread manufacture to sewing and packaging. The name of the factory was invented by Hebrew novelist, S.Y. Agnon. ATA is an acronym for the Hebrew words "Arigei Totzeret Artzeinu" – "fabrics manufactured in our land". In the 1960s, Israeli fashion designer Lola Beer Ebner designed a line of fashionable dresses in bright colors for ATA at the request of Moller's widow. In the 1980s, ATA closed down and a residential neighborhood was built on the site of its factory.

In the kibbutz egalitarian culture, the special dress served as an intentional anti-fashion. While the tembel hat, symbolised the agricultural hard-work.

In the early years of the state, Ruth Dayan, wife of Moshe Dayan, founded Maskit, a fashion and decorative arts house that helped to create jobs for new immigrants while preserving the Jewish ethnic crafts of various communities living in Israel. In 1955, Dayan met fashion designer Finy Leitersdorf, who designed clothes and accessories for Maskit for 15 years. The two collaborated on a joint exhibit of Maskit designs at the Dizengoff Museum (today the Tel Aviv Museum). Maskit produced textiles, clothing, objets d’art and jewelry.

In 1956, Lea Gottlieb founded Gottex, a high-fashion beachwear and swimwear company that became a leading exporter of designer bathing suits.

An Israeli model in a leather jacket, 1969.

Israeli fashion has been worn by some of the world's most famous women, among them Jackie Kennedy, Princess Diana, Katharine Hepburn, Elizabeth Taylor and Sarah Jessica Parker. Beyoncé and Lady Gaga have worn gowns with a metallic bodice design by Alon Livne, and Beyoncé commissioned Livne to create her wardrobe for her Mrs. Carter Show World Tour in 2013. Livne has also designed outfits for the Hunger Games film series.

Maskit which closed in 1994, reopened in 2013 with the support of billionaire industrialist Stef Wertheimer and took part in Moscow's Mercedes Benz Fashion Week that year.

== Israeli fashion week ==
In 2011, Tel Aviv hosted its first Fashion Week since the 1980s with Italian designer Roberto Cavalli as a guest of honor.

In 2015, at the third Tel Aviv Fashion Week, 21 Israeli designers presented their creations to an audience of 24,000 that included 100 members of the international press, dozens of retailers and local celebrities. Israeli model Bar Refaeli modeled at the opening gala.

In recent years, Tel Aviv Fashion Week has continued to attract media attention and has been used as a platform for social and cultural initiatives.

The event has also been covered by Israeli media as part of the country’s cultural landscape.

== In the United States ==
In 2009 Ruti Zisser, an Israeli American lifestyle designer, founded Ruti Inc., a fashion company dedicated to manufacturing and distributing her designs, and to showcase Israeli fashion designers internationally. The company grew rapidly with flagship stores at some of the main fashion streets in the country.

Elie Tahari, a designer of luxury ready-to-wear clothing and fashion accessories. His company headquartered in New York City with stores located throughout the world.

Tahari has remained a visible figure in fashion-related public and cultural initiatives connected to Israel.

== See also ==
- Fashion Forward
- Culture of Israel
- Shenkar College of Engineering and Design
- Project Runway Israel
- Biblical clothing
- Jewish religious clothing
