= Lea Gottlieb =

Israeli fashion designer and businesswoman

- לאה גוטליב
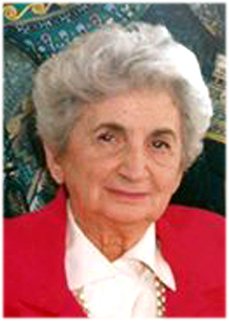
- Born: Leah Lenke Roth; 17 September 1918; Sajószentpéter, Hungary
- Died: 17 November 2012 (aged 94); Tel Aviv, Israel
- Other name: Lady Leah
- Occupations: Fashion designer, businesswoman
- Known for: Founder and chief designer of Gottex
- Spouse: Armin Gottlieb
- Children: Judith Gottlieb; Miriam Ruzow

Lea Gottlieb (Hebrew: לאה גוטליב; 17 September 1918 – 17 November 2012) was an Israeli fashion designer and businesswoman. She immigrated to Israel from Hungary after World War II, and founded the Gottex company.

== Biography ==
Lea Lenke Roth was born in Sajószentpéter, Hungary, the only daughter of a Jewish family. She was raised in poverty by an aunt. Before World War II began, she was planning to study chemistry, but could not continue higher studies in Budapest because of the quota on Jews accepted to academic institutions. After her marriage to Armin Gottlieb, she worked as a bookkeeper at the raincoat factory owned by her husband's family.

During Germany's occupation of Hungary in the mid-1940s, her husband Armin was shipped to a labor camp. Gottlieb hid from the Nazis in Sajószentpéter and Budapest, moving from one hiding place to another with her daughters Miriam and Judith. At checkpoints, she hid her head in a bouquet of flowers to avoid being recognized as a Jew. Once, after seeing a Nazi with a pistol, she concealed herself and her children in a pit behind a house.

Gottlieb died at her home in Tel Aviv on 17 November 2012, at the age of 94.

== Fashion career ==
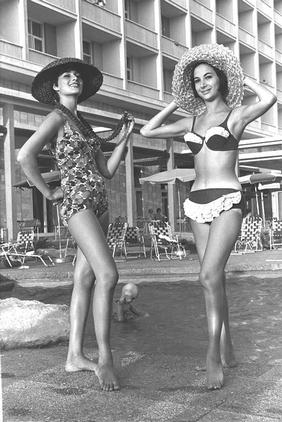
Gottex swimsuits, 1961

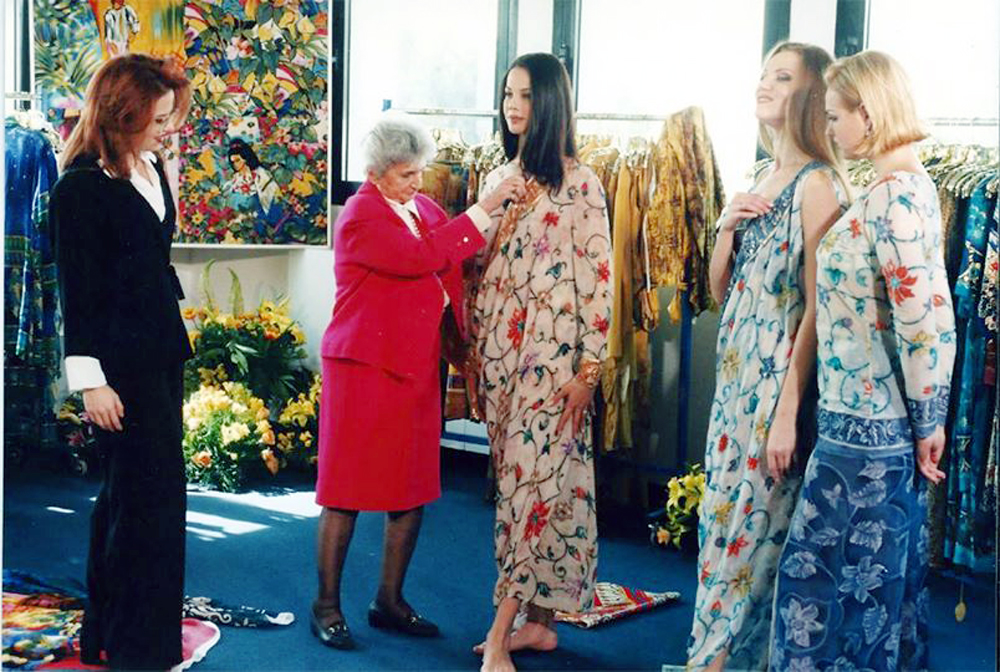
Lea Gottlieb with models

Gottlieb and her family survived the war, and after the liberation, she and her husband ran a raincoat factory in Czechoslovakia. They immigrated to Haifa, Israel in 1949. She recalled: "We came with nothing, without money, with nowhere to live. The first two or three years were very, very hard."

With money borrowed from family and friends, she and her husband opened a raincoat factory in Jaffa in 1949. But for months, they "saw no rain, only sunshine." Lea Gottlieb cut the patterns and designed new models.

In 1956, they founded Gottex, a high-fashion beachwear and swimwear company that became a leading exporter, shipping to 80 countries. The company's name is a combination of "Gottlieb" and "textiles".

Gottlieb began by selling her wedding ring to raise money to buy fabric. She borrowed a sewing machine, and sewed swimsuits in their Jaffa apartment.

She was Gottex's chief designer. The business soon moved to a larger facility on Hagdud Ha'ivri in Tel Aviv, and began to export to Malta, United States, Canada, Europe and the Far East. As the company expanded, Gottlieb created beach outfits by complementing swimsuits with matching tops, pareos, caftans, tunics, loose pants, small corsets and skirts. Her collections often had dramatic and varied patterns that were inspired by and dominated by flowers, which she felt had saved her life during the Nazi occupation.

Gottlieb said she took her inspiration from the light and contrasting colors of Israel: "the turquoise of the Mediterranean, the golden yellow of the desert sand, the blue of the Sea of Galilee, the pink of Jerusalem stone, and the many shades of green of the Galilee."

In 1973, when the Yom Kippur War broke out, Gottlieb canceled a foreign tour, took over operations at Gottex, and arranged fashion shows for front-line soldiers. By 1984, Gottex had sales of $40 million ($124 million in current dollar terms), and was the leading exporter of fashion swimwear to the United States, and had two-thirds of the Israeli swimwear market. Among those who wore the company's bathing suits were Diana, Princess of Wales, Spain's Queen Sofia, Elizabeth Taylor, Brooke Shields and Nancy Kissinger. In 1991, almost half of the company's $60 million business was in the United States.

Lev Leviev, the owner of the Africa-Israel Group, acquired Gottex in 1997. After about a year heading the design team, Gottlieb left the company. Once her non-compete agreement with Gottex expired, at the age of 85 she founded a new swimwear design company, under her own name.

== See also ==
- Israeli fashion
- Women of Israel
