= Maskit =

Israeli government-owned fashion house

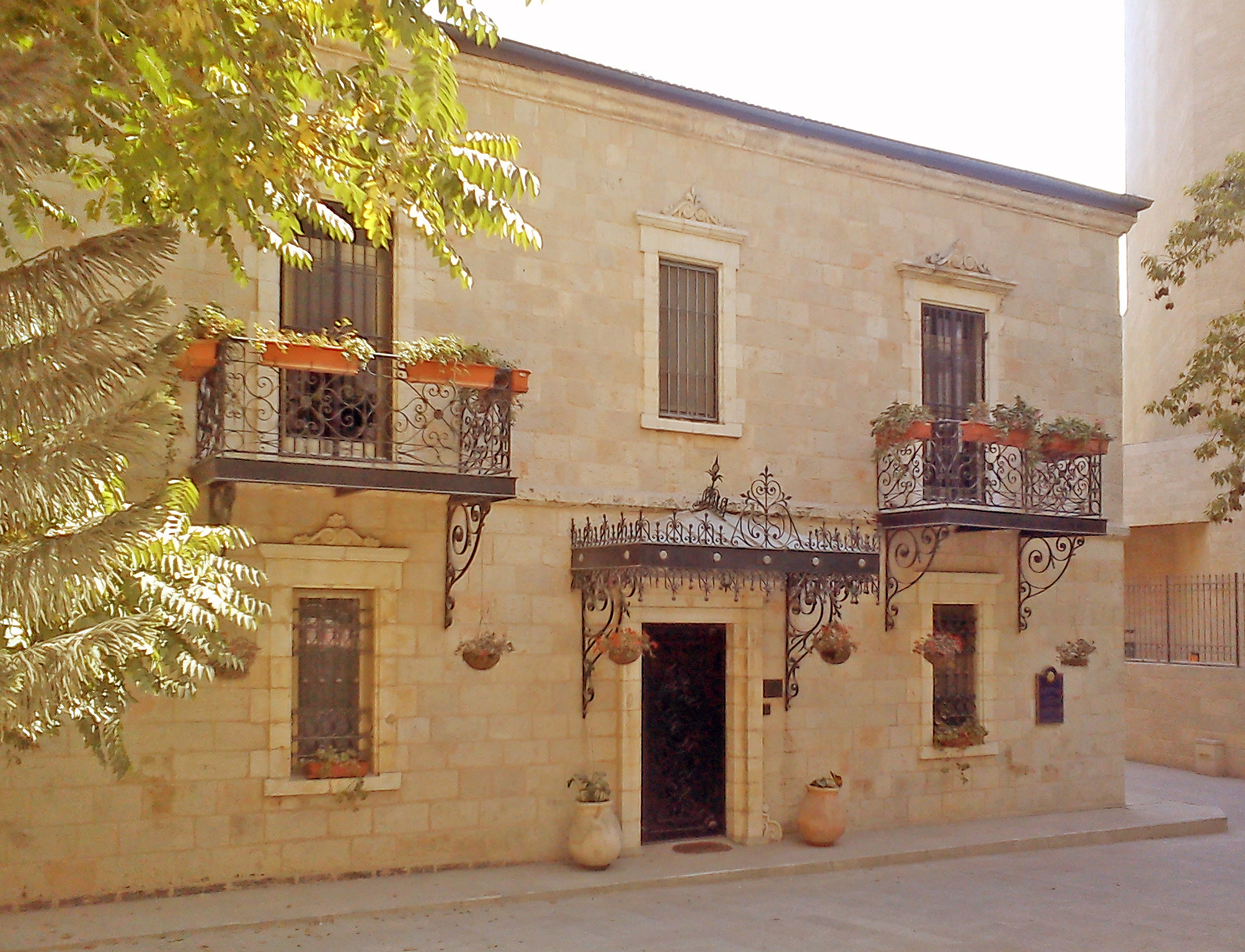
Maskit House in Jerusalem

Maskit (Hebrew: משכית) is an Israeli fashion house founded in 1954 by Ruth Dayan, the first wife of Moshe Dayan. It was the first fashion house in Israel. Maskit produces textiles, clothing, objets d’art, and jewelry.

== Etymology ==
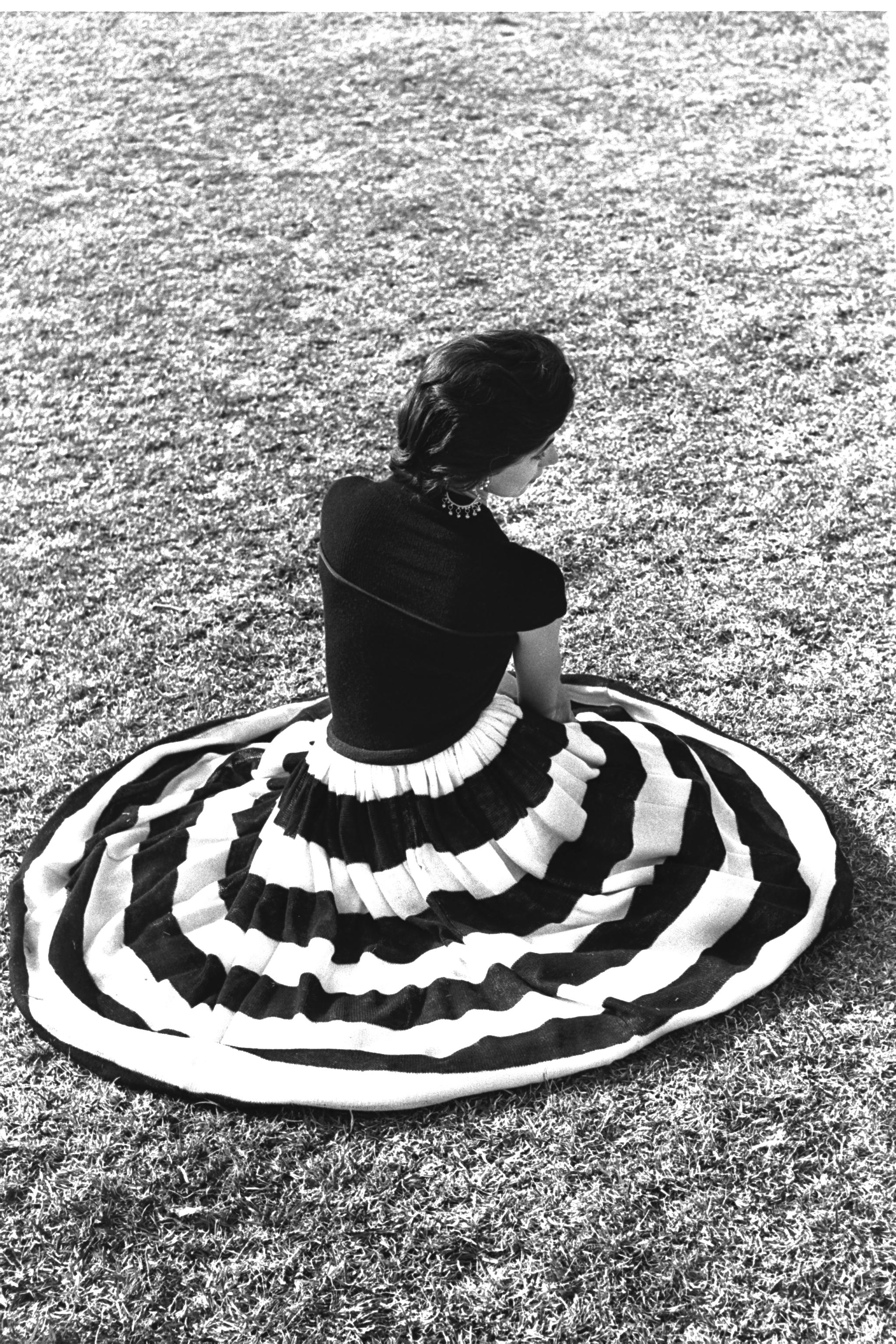
Maskit dress, 1956

The Hebrew word "maskit," meaning an ornament, or something small and beautiful, appears in the Bible 14 times.

== History ==
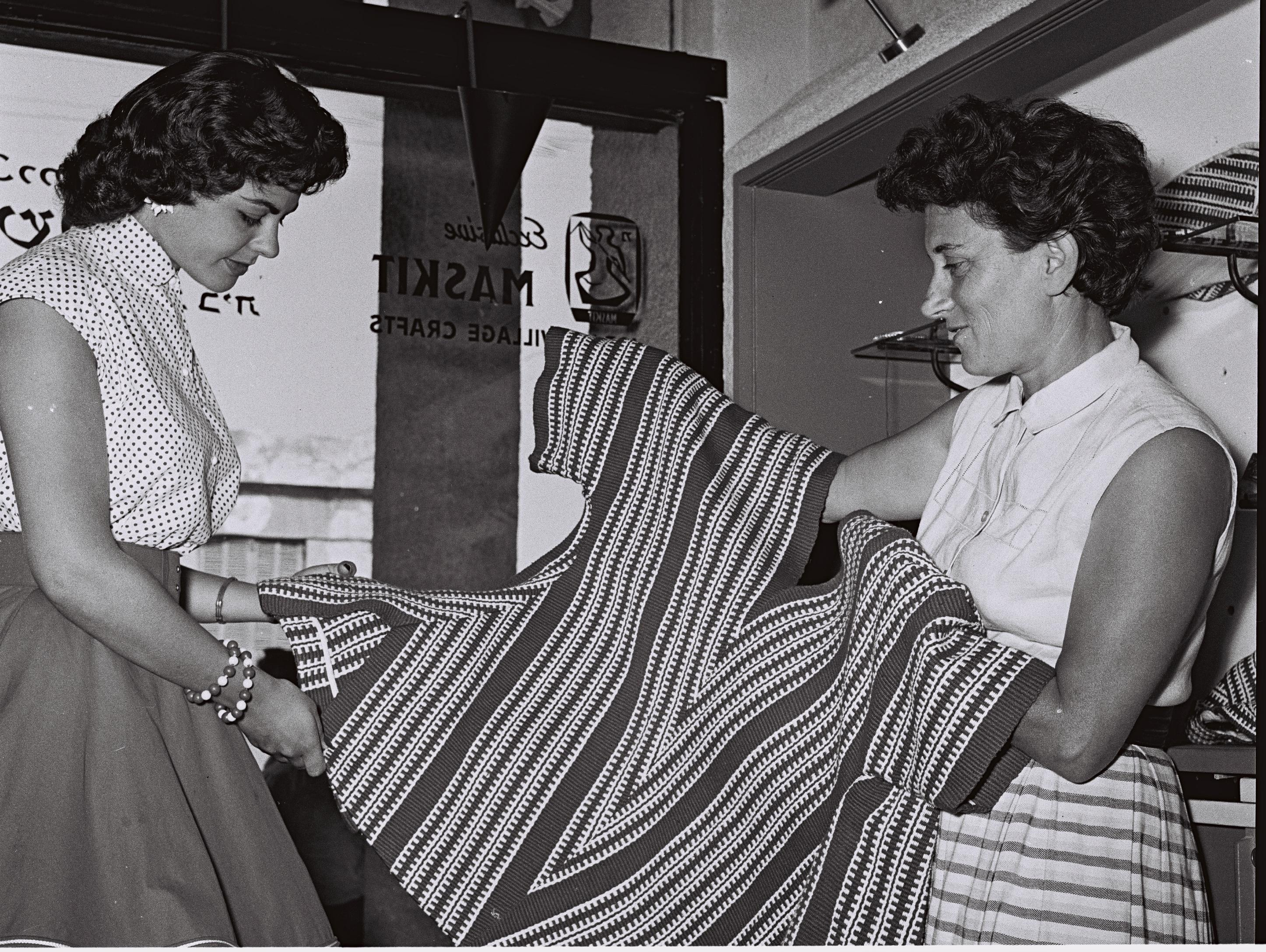
Maskit founder Ruth Dayan and Miss Israel 1956, Sara Tal, with Maskit tunic

During the early years of the state of Israel, Ruth Dayan recognized the artistic skills of many new immigrants, particularly in decorative arts like embroidery and crafts. In 1954, she established Maskit with the aim of blending modern European patterns with ethnic embroidery traditions.

In 1955, Dayan met fashion designer Finy Leitersdorf, who designed clothes and accessories for Maskit over a period of 15 years. The two collaborated on a joint exhibit of Maskit designs at the Dizengoff Museum (today the Tel Aviv Museum).

In an interview in 1966, Leitersdorf spoke about the "Israeliness" of Maskit clothing. It was not just the Yemenite embroidery, she said, but the "range of colors - the desert brown, the impure black inspired by Bedouin tents, and the eternally changing blue of the Mediterranean." She also cited the loose design, appropriate for the country's hot climate.

Clients such as Audrey Hepburn attest to the worldwide success of Maskit in the 1960's. From the 1960s to the 1980s, Maskit employed 2,000 people, with ten stores in Israel and one in New York. Maskit garments were sold by Bergdorf Goodman, Neiman Marcus and Saks Fifth Avenue.

The company closed in 1994 but it was reopened in 2013 by Nir and Sharon Tal, who had worked for Deloitte and Alexander McQueen. One of the investors was Israeli businessman Stef Wertheimer, founder of the industrial tool manufacturer Iscar.

== See also ==
- Israeli fashion
- Economy of Israel
- Culture of Israel
- American–German Colony, where Ruth Dayan opened a Maskit branch and the "Keren" restaurant, a pioneer of Israeli fine dining
