= Lola Beer Ebner =

Israeli fashion designer

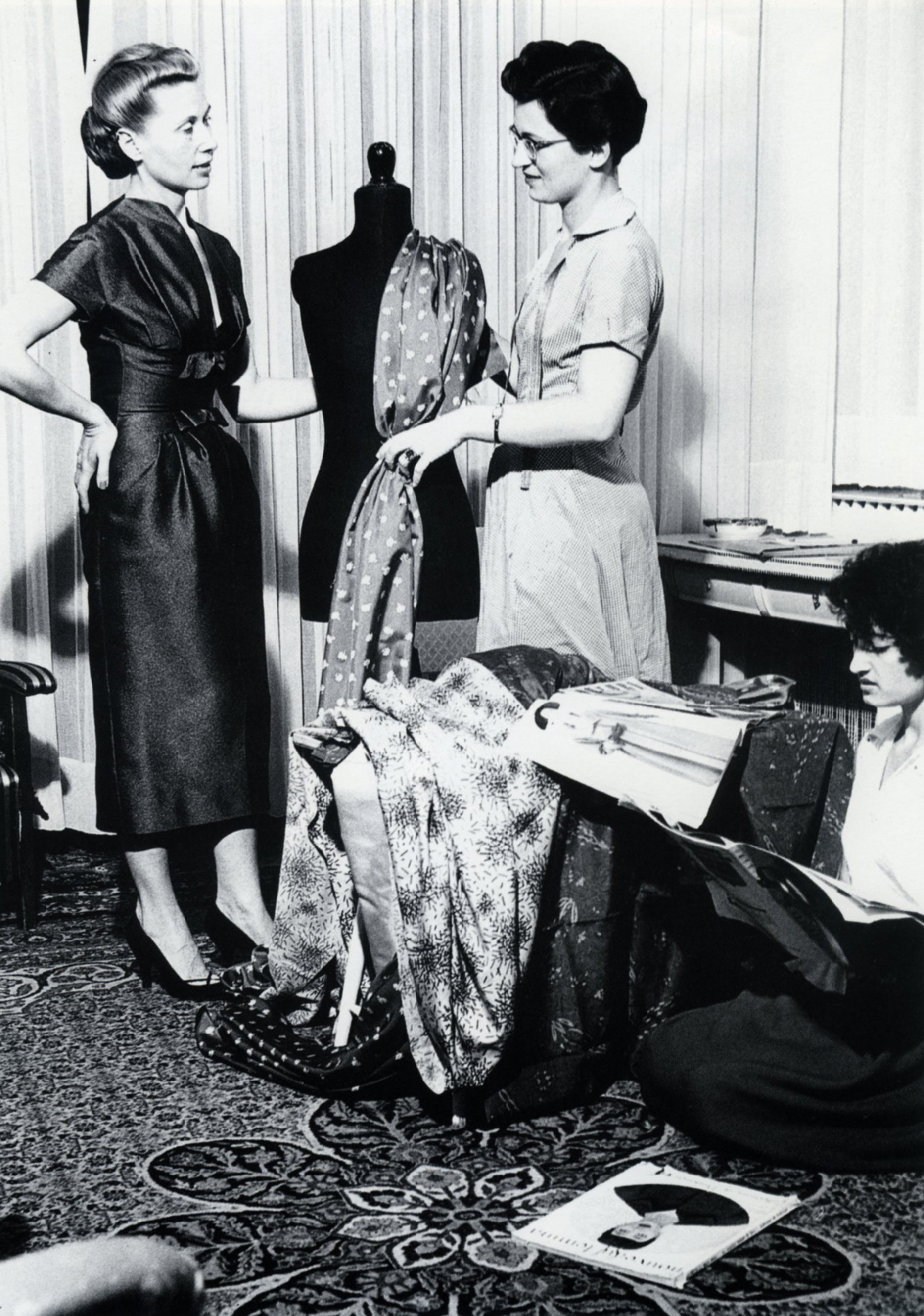
- Lola Beer in her Studio on Yarkon Street in Tel Aviv-Yafo, 1950s
- Born: 6 August 1910; Prostějov, Margraviate of Moravia, Austria-Hungary (now Czech Republic)
- Died: 3 March 1997 (aged 86); Tel Aviv, Israel
- Known for: Designer
- Movement: Israeli fashion
- Spouse(s): 1939-1945: Joseph Beer; 1945-1997: Adolph 'Dolfi' Ebner

Lola Beer Ebner, born Carola Zwillinger (Hebrew: לולה באר אבנר; 6 August 1910 – 3 March 1997) was an Israeli fashion designer.

== Biography ==
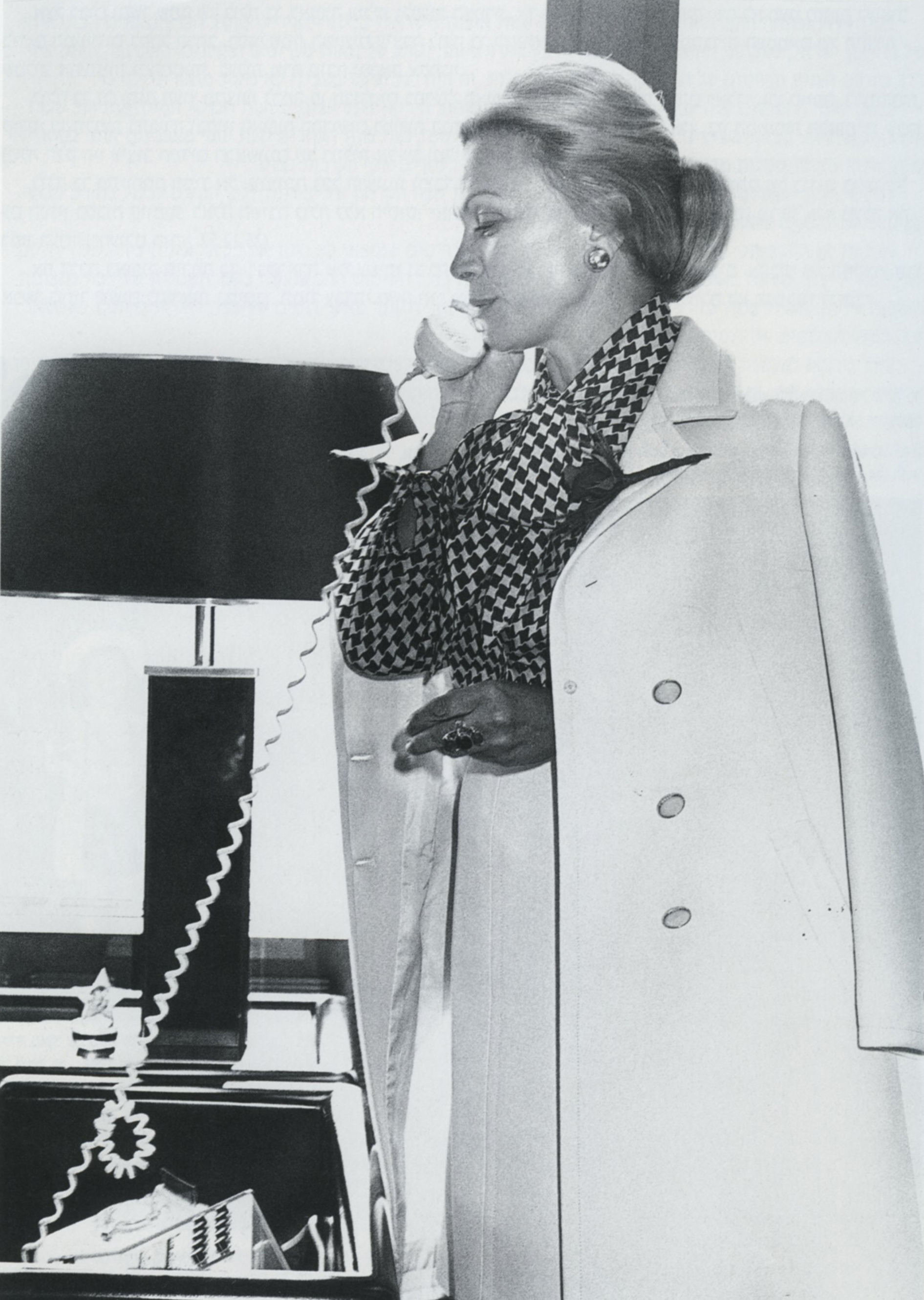
Rachel Dayan dressed in an outfit by Lola Beer

Lola Beer Ebner was born in Moravian town of Prostějov, that became part of Czechoslovakia in 1918. She studied at the Academy of Arts, Architecture and Design in Prague. In 1939, she left for Mandatory Palestine.

In Israel, she became known as the "national dresser" for designing the clothes of the wives of Israeli prime ministers and politicians. In the 1950s, she designed uniforms for El Al stewardesses and in the 1960s, the uniforms for Israel Defense Forces women soldiers. She designed the academic robes of the Weizmann Institute and theater costumes. She also designed a ready-made line of dresses for ATA, which had previously made uniforms and sturdy work clothes, and marketed two perfumes, "Dimona" and "Dimont." Beer Ebner took her inspiration from Paris and quipped that it would “at least five hundred years” to develop uniquely Israeli fashion.

An exhibit of Beer Ebner's work was held in 2010 at Tel Aviv's Czech Center.

== Awards and recognition ==
- The Israel Postal Company held a competition to create a stamp featuring a fashion item. Students from the Department of Graphic Design at Shenkar designed these stamps and included a corduroy mini-dress designed by Lola Beer-Ebner for ATA during the 1960s.

== See also ==
- Israeli fashion
