= Alon Livne =

Israeli fashion designer (born 1984/85)

- אלון ליבנה
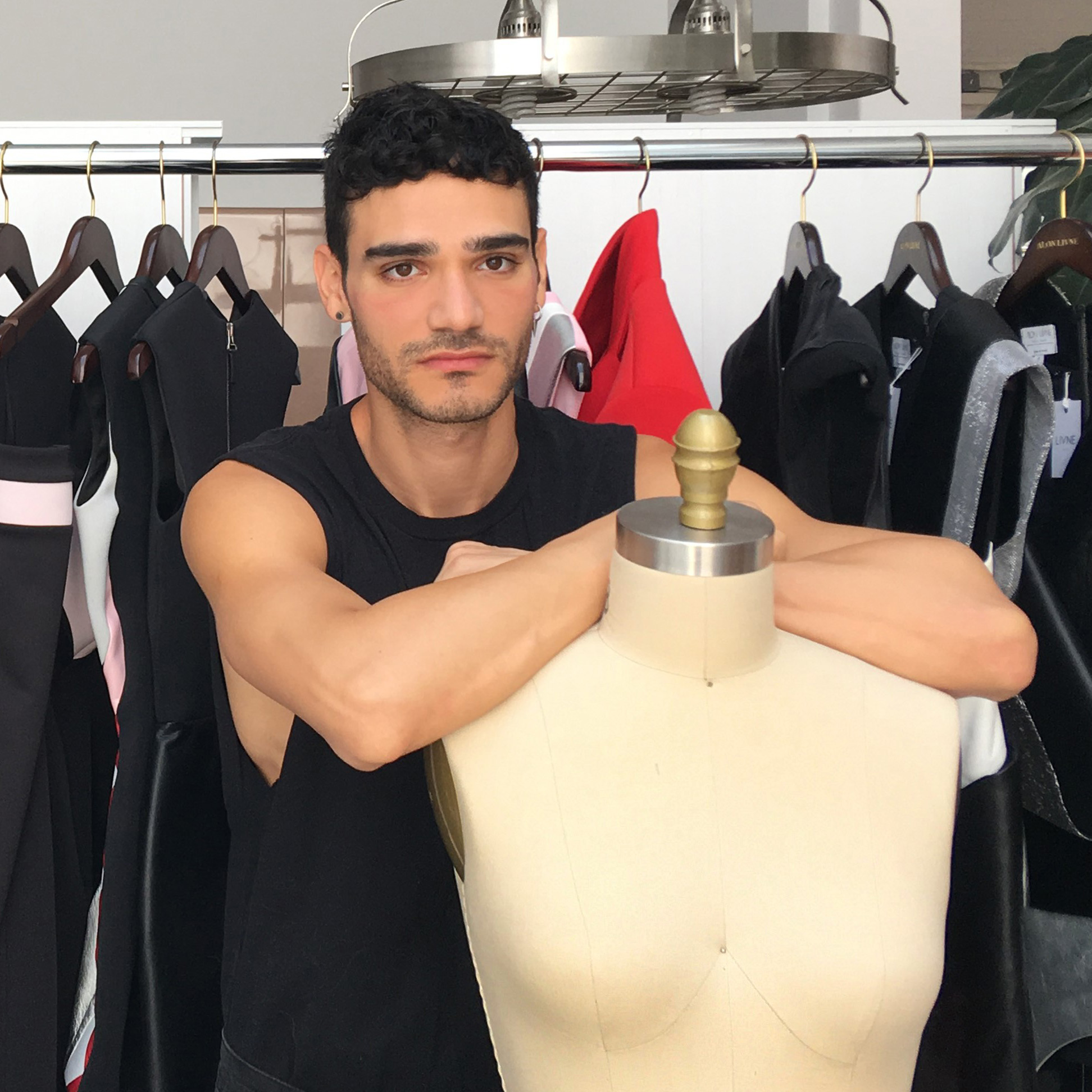
- Livne in 2017
- Born: 1984 or 1985 (age 41–42); Tel Aviv, Israel
- Education: Fashion Design at Shenkar College of Art and Design
- Occupation: Fashion designer
- Labels: Alon Livné; Alon Livné White
- Website: alonlivne.com

Alon Livne (Hebrew: אלון ליבנה) is an Israeli fashion designer.

== Early and personal life ==
Livne was born as an only child in Tel Aviv to Jewish parents, his mother being a hairdresser and his father a businessman.

Livne is gay. In 2009, he married his lifelong partner, architect Gil Ayalon. The couple live in Tel Aviv.

== Career ==
Livne studied art and sculpting at various art oriented high-schools and went on to the world-renowned Shenkar College of Art and Design to study Fashion Design at the age of 17, having already mastered the art of sewing and patternmaking.

Livne started his career at fashion houses Roberto Cavalli and Alexander McQueen, before participating in the Israeli TV show Project Runway Israel.

Livne later started his own self-titled ready-to-wear line, worn by celebrities such as Lady Gaga, Naomi Campbell, Kim Kardashian and Paris Hilton. In 2013, Livne showed his work at New York Fashion Week for the first time, and showcased his works there until 2016.

In May 2013, Beyoncé commissioned Livne to design outfits for her The Mrs. Carter Show World Tour.

Livne's spring/summer 2017 collection was presented in Paris during the Paris Fashion Week, marking the first time an Israeli brand was scheduled. It was mostly well received by the international press.

In May 2022, Livne collaborated with Styletech, an Israeli startup that creates strikingly realistic virtual models using automated AI technology.

== Alon Livné White ==
Alon Livne's bridal line "Alon Livné White" is sold internationally. A presentation of the collection is held bi-annually during Bridal Fashion Week in New York City.

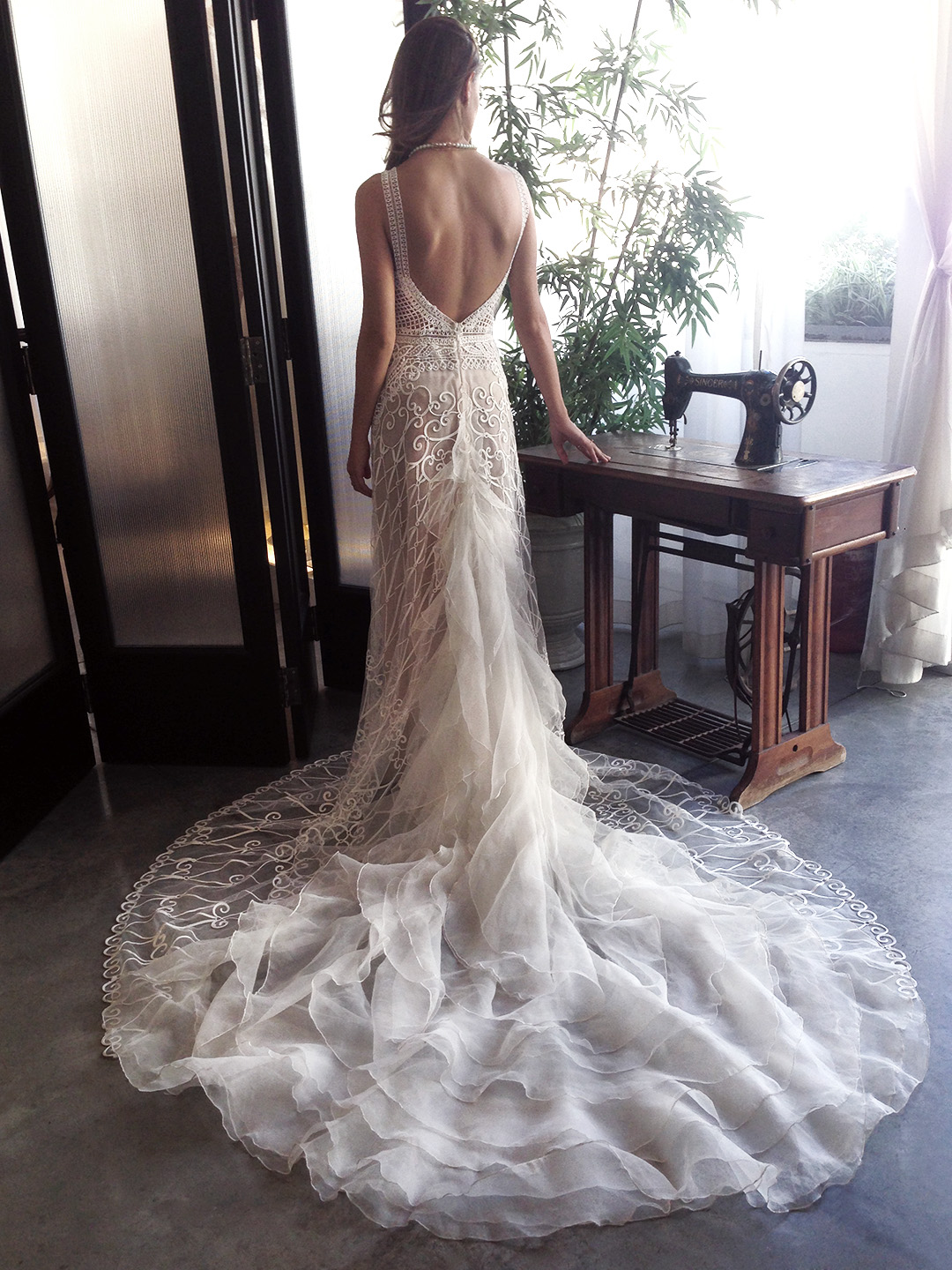
The "Aria" gown by Alon Livne White

== See also ==
- Israeli fashion
- Project Runway Israel
- List of fashion designers
