= Tami Ben-Ami =

Israeli model (1955–1995)

- תמי בן עמי
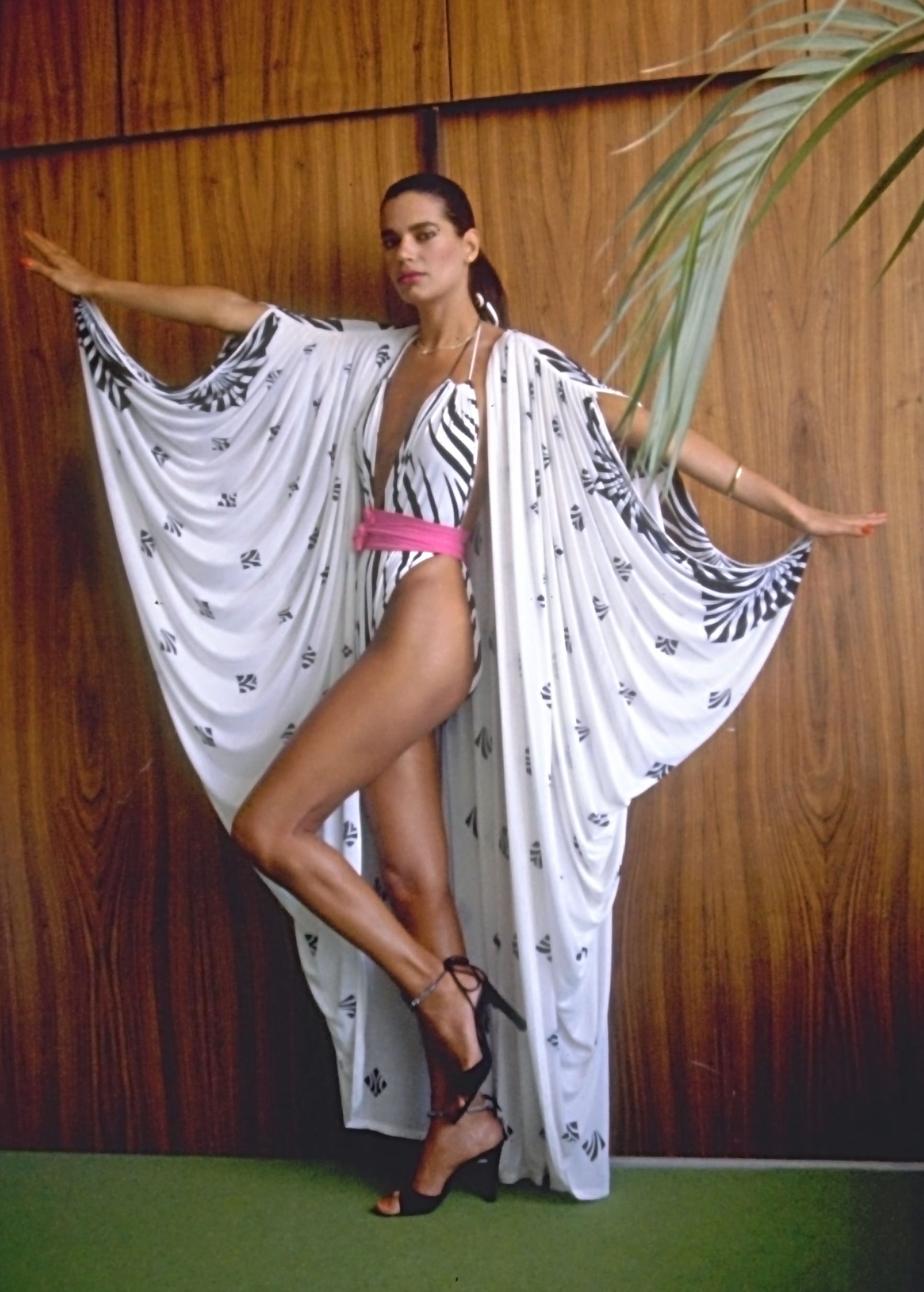
- Ben-Ami in a Gottex swimsuit (1980)
- Born: 1955; Ramla, Israel
- Died: 22 July 1995 (aged 40); Rishon LeZion, Israel
- Resting place: New Gordon Cemetery
- Occupation: Model
- Partner: Aulcie Perry

Tami Ben-Ami (Hebrew: תמי בן עמי; 1955 – 22 July 1995) was an Israeli model. She had a high-profile relationship with Aulcie Perry, an African American basketball player for Maccabi Tel Aviv B.C.

Ben-Ami died on 22 July 1995 at the age of 40 from cervical cancer.
