= Aulcie Perry =

American-Israeli basketball player

Aulcie Perry אולסי פרי
- Aulcie Perry, opening a sports shop in Tel Aviv, 1983

Personal information
- Born: July 3, 1950 (age 76) Newark, New Jersey, U.S.
- Listed height: 6 ft 10 in (2.08 m)
- Listed weight: 216 lb (98 kg)

Career information
- High school: West Side (Newark, New Jersey)
- College: Bethune-Cookman (1971–1973)
- NBA draft: 1974: Supplemental round
- Drafted by: Boston Celtics
- Playing career: 1974–1985
- Position: Center
- Number: 8

Career history
- 1974–1975: Virginia Squires
- 1974–1976: Allentown Jets
- 1976–1985: Maccabi Tel Aviv

Career highlights
- FIBA Intercontinental Cup champion (1980); 2× EuroLeague champion (1977, 1981); 9× Israeli League champion (1977–1985); 8× Israeli Cup winner (1977–1983, 1985); 2× EBA champion (1975, 1976); All-EBA First Team (1975); All-EBA Second Team (1976); EBA Rookie of the Year (1975)
- Stats at Basketball Reference

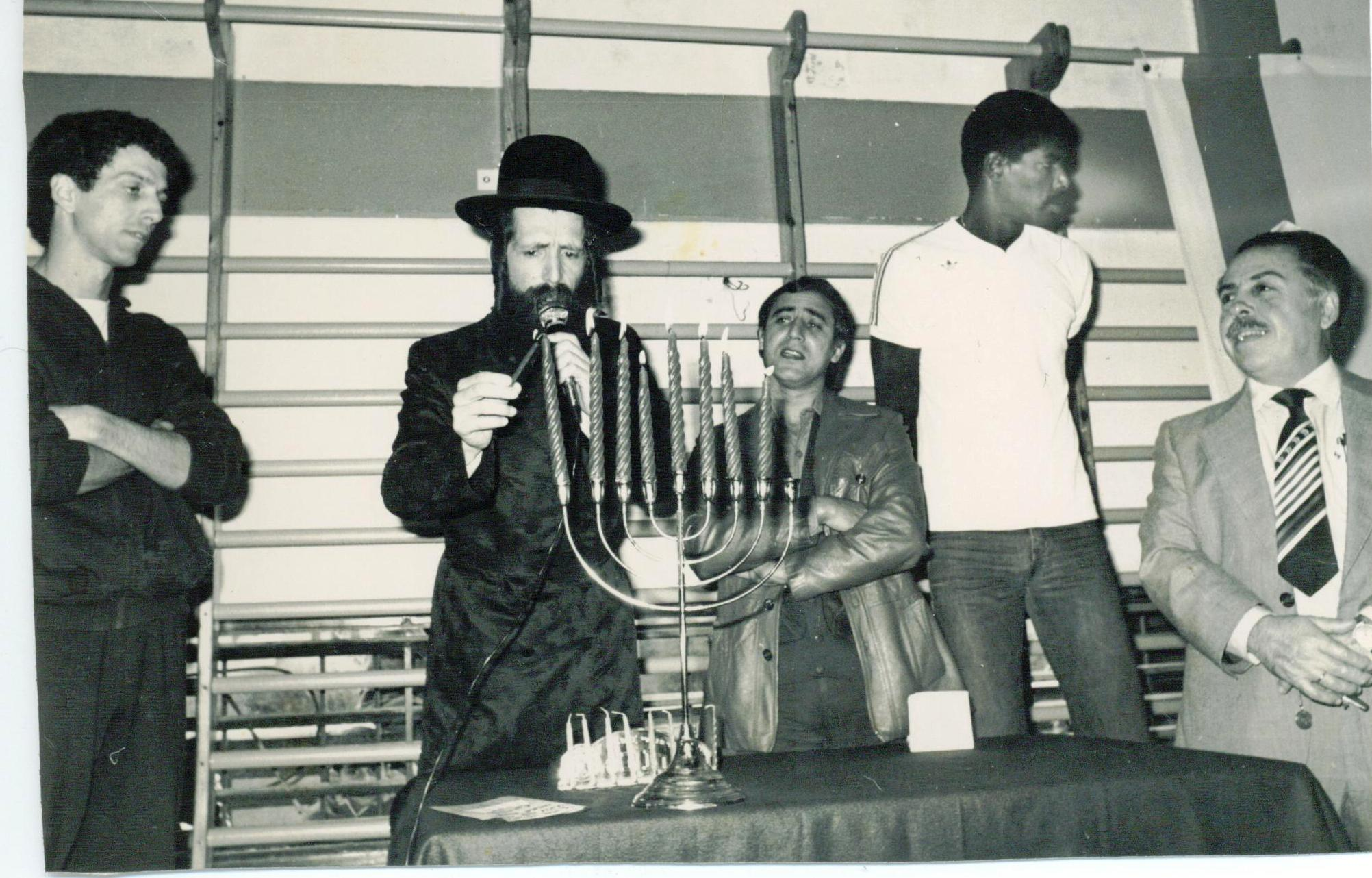
Aulcie Perry (second from right), 1978–1979

Aulcie Perry (Hebrew: אולסי פרי; born July 3, 1950) is a retired American-Israeli professional basketball player. He helped Maccabi Tel Aviv win two EuroLeague championships, during his nine seasons with the team. During his playing career, he was listed at 2.08 m (6 ft 10 in) tall, and 98 kg (216 lb) in weight, and he played at the center position.

In 1987, Perry was convicted of drug-smuggling. He was sentenced to ten years in prison. He was released in January 1992.

== High school ==
Perry was born in Newark, New Jersey. He attended Newark's West Side High School, where he played high school basketball.

== College career ==
Perry graduated from Bethune-Cookman University in Florida, where he played college basketball with the Wildcats.

== Professional career ==
=== United States ===
Perry was selected by the Boston Celtics as a supplemental pick in the 1974 NBA draft. He signed to the Virginia Squires of the American Basketball Association (ABA) in 1974. Perry was cut from the team during the 1974–75 season, however, and spent the balance of the season with the Allentown Jets, of the Eastern Basketball Association (EBA). He won the EBA championship, was selected as the EBA Rookie of the Year and named to the All-EBA First Team in 1975. The following season, he was signed by the New York Knicks, but he never played for the team. After being released by the Knicks, Perry returned to the Jets. He won a second EBA championship and was selected to the All-EBA Second Team in 1976.

=== Israel ===
During the summer of 1976, Perry was spotted by a scout for Maccabi Tel Aviv, while playing at the Rucker courts in Harlem. Maccabi Tel Aviv signed Perry for US$6,000 a month, a small sum by American standards, but at the time, one of the highest salaries in the Israeli Super League, in which Maccabi Tel Aviv competed. The other players on the team responded to his leadership and the team had what Sports Illustrated writer Alexander Wolff described as "the most extraordinary season in its remarkable history" and what Perry called "the best nine months of [his] life". In 1977, Perry helped to lead the team to its first FIBA European Champions Cup (EuroLeague) championship, a prize they took again four years later. Perry played a total of nine seasons with Maccabi Tel Aviv, during which the team won eight Israeli Cups and nine Israeli League championships.

Perry became a celebrity in Israel. He was congratulated by Prime Ministers Yitzhak Rabin and Menachem Begin, who said he helped bring "honor to the people of Israel". He began dating Israeli model Tami Ben-Ami, and the couple were the darlings of the press. Everywhere Perry went, he was besieged by fans seeking his autograph. In Israel, his name became a generic phrase for a tall person; one Israeli might remark to another that her child had grown into a real Aulcie Perry, and a children's song by Arik Einstein included the lyrics "If only I were tall like Aulcie Perry".

After the 1977–78 season, Perry converted to Judaism. He adopted the Hebrew name Elisha ben Avraham (אלישע בן אברהם). Shortly thereafter, Perry became an Israeli citizen.

== Drug possession and prison ==
In December 1982, Perry missed a game against Real Madrid. The team told reporters that he was sick with the flu, but in fact a worsening drug problem had kept him from the game. In March 1983, Perry was arrested and charged with buying heroin; he pleaded guilty and was given a fine of $150,000 and a suspended sentence.

Perry and his cousin, Kenneth Johnson, were detained in September 1985, when they flew from Amsterdam to New York. Johnson was arrested when customs officials found that the portable stereo he was carrying contained 3.5 pounds (1.6 kg) of 89 percent pure heroin, with an estimated street value of $1.8 million. The U.S. Drug Enforcement Administration spent the next several months accumulating evidence against Perry, who they suspected was involved with the drug smuggling. In January 1986, a warrant was issued for his arrest. After nine months of fighting extradition, Perry returned to New York for trial.

At the trial, prosecutors portrayed Perry as the mastermind behind the smuggling scheme. Johnson had never been abroad before, but Perry was an experienced traveler. Perry had paid for airline tickets in cash, and he was seen traveling with a bagful of cash. Finally, a flight attendant recognized him from the airplane, where Perry had been holding the portable stereo.

In February 1987, Perry was convicted of conspiracy to import heroin, importation of heroin, and possession of heroin with intent to distribute. Two months later, he was sentenced to ten years in prison. He was released in January 1992.

== After prison ==
After his release from prison in January 1992, Perry returned to Israel, where he managed a Burger Ranch restaurant. He sponsors a basketball camp for children in Israel. Perry also coaches one of Maccabi Tel Aviv's youth teams.
