= Ruth Dayan =

Israeli activist (1917–2021)

- רות דיין
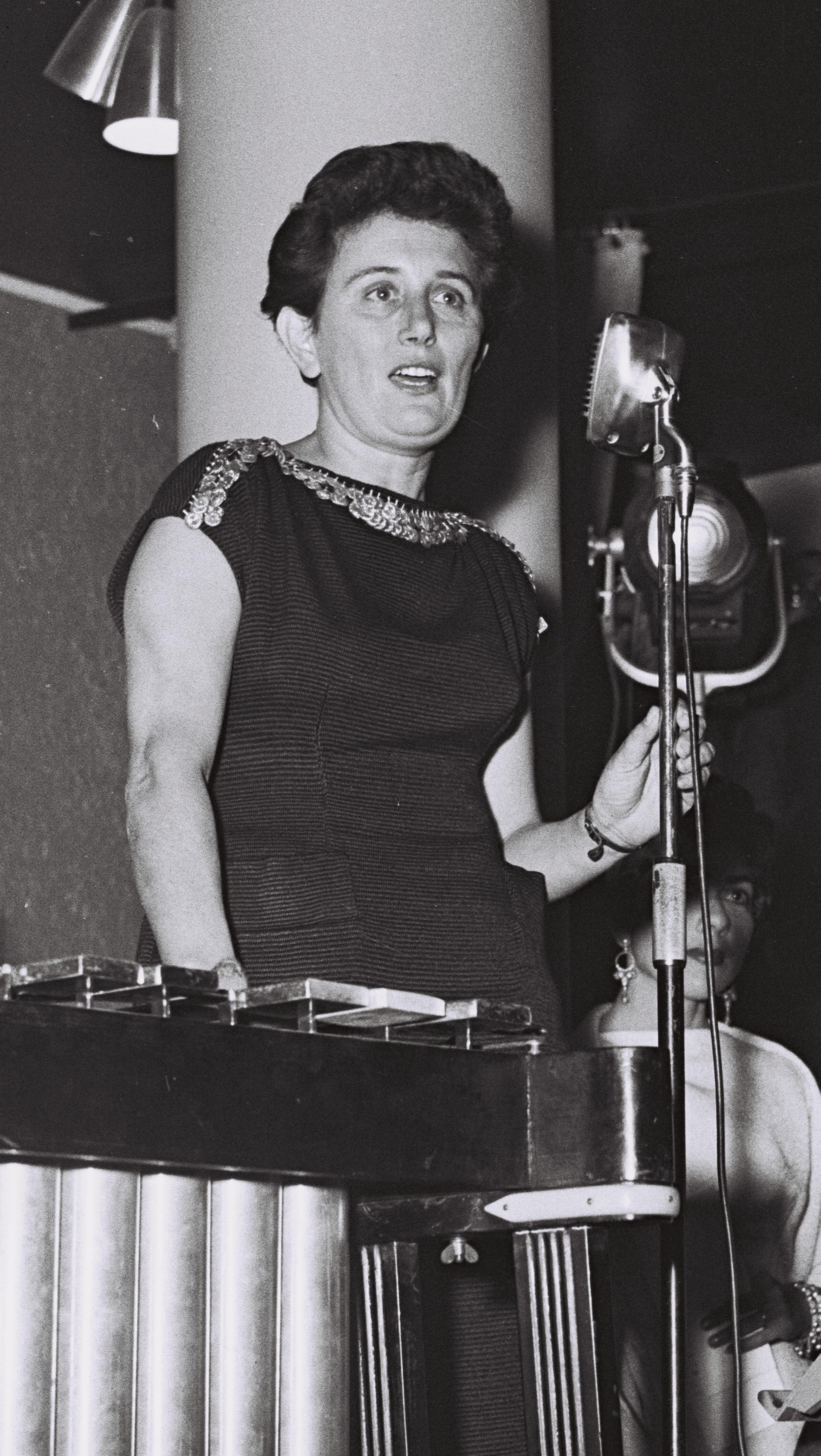
- Ruth Dayan in 1955
- Born: Ruth Schwartz (רות שוורץ); 6 March 1917; Haifa, Ottoman Empire
- Died: 5 February 2021 (aged 103); Tel Aviv, Israel
- Resting place: Nahalal Cemetery
- Known for: Social activist; writer
- Spouse: Moshe Dayan (m. 1935; div. 1971)
- Children: 3

Ruth Dayan (Hebrew: רות דיין; 6 March 1917 – 5 February 2021) was an Israeli social activist who was the founder of the Maskit fashion house. She was also the first wife of Israeli Foreign Minister and General, Moshe Dayan (1915–1981). Active in many social causes, Dayan was a recipient of the Israeli President's Medal of Distinction, the Solomon Bublick Award, and the Yigal Allon Prize, in recognition of her social empowerment efforts.

== Biography ==
Ruth Schwartz (later Dayan) was born in Haifa in 1917 during the end of the Ottoman Empire rule of the region, as the elder of the two daughters of Rachel (née Klimkar) and Tzvi Schwartz. Her parents were Russian Jewish immigrants who were part of the Second Aliyah. When Schwartz was two, the family relocated to England, where her parents completed their education. The family returned to Mandatory Palestine when she was 8. At this time, her mother, Rachel Schwartz was the first woman in Palestine to obtain a driver's license. Her sister married Ezer Weizman, nephew of Chaim Weizmann.

Ruth moved to Nahalal when she was 18 and met her future husband, Israeli military leader and politician, Moshe Dayan. The couple married in 1935, and remained married for 36 years until their divorce in 1971. During this time, the couple lived in Nahalal and later in Tzahala. The couple's early years were difficult, with conditions at the moshav being primitive and her husband being active with the Haganah. His association with that organization led to his arrest and detention in a British prison for more than a year.

The couple had three children: Yael Dayan, a former Knesset member and Deputy Mayor of Tel Aviv; Ehud (Udi) Dayan, a writer, who died in 2017; and Asaf "Assi" Dayan, an actor and filmmaker who died in 2014. Dayan's sister, Reuma, was married to Ezer Weizman, the Israeli air force general, Defense minister and the seventh President of Israel.

Dayan collaborated on her life story with biographer Anthony David on a book which was published as The Remarkable Lives of Israeli Ruth Dayan and Palestinian Raymonda Tawil and their Forty Year Peace Mission (2015). Earlier, she had created a sensation with her tell-all book Or Did I Dream the Dream? The Story of Ruth Dayan, coauthored with journalist Helga Dudman in 1973, which became a best-seller. Among other things, Dayan said her husband "had such bad taste in women".

Dayan died on 5 February 2021 at her home in Tel Aviv. She was 103, one month and one day short of her 104th birthday.

== Career ==
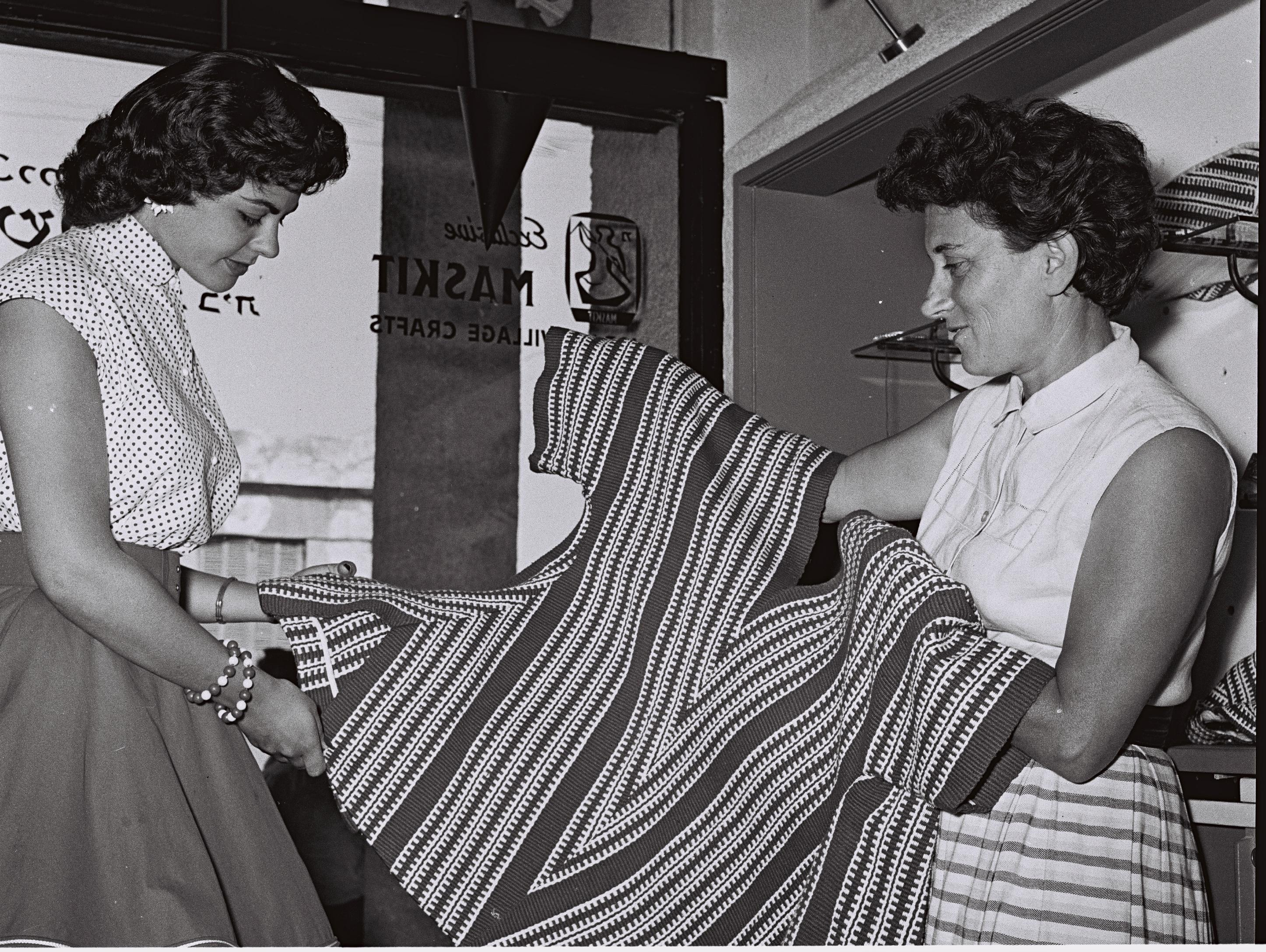
Dayan with Miss Israel 1956, Sarah Tal, showing Maskit's designs, 1956

In 1954, Dayan founded Maskit, a fashion and decorative arts house that provided her with a way of creating jobs for new immigrants and preserving Jewish ethnic crafts and culture of the various communities living in Israel. In 1955, Dayan met fashion designer Finy Leitersdorf, who designed clothes and accessories for Maskit for 15 years. The two collaborated on a joint exhibit of Maskit designs at the Dizengoff Museum (today the Tel Aviv Museum). Maskit went on to have ten stores in Israel and one in New York, and supported over 2000 families. Its products were sold at department stores in the United States, and its fashions were used in galas and fundraisers for Israel Bonds.

Maskit ceased operations in 1994. However, some of the designs from Maskit were picked up by designer Sharon Tal, when Dayan collaborated with her when Tal returned from London after having worked there for British designer Alexander McQueen.

=== Social activism ===
Dayan was an advocate of peaceful relations between Israel and Palestine. She founded a Jewish–Arab social group, Brit Bnei Shem (Ibnaa Sam). She worked on behalf of new immigrants, the rights of Bedouins, and women's causes. She was a lifelong friend of Palestinian poet and nationalist Raymonda Tawil, mother of Suha Arafat who in 1990 became the wife of PLO leader Yasser Arafat. In 1977, she became a member of the Left Camp of Israel (Sheli), which focused on peace negotiations. She also was the seventh place on Sheli's list for the Knesset election, but she did not get elected. In 1978, Dayan and Tawil planted a peace forest in Neve Shalom, Israel. Dayan was also a member of charity initiatives including founding Variety Israel, which supported abandoned children and children with disabilities. Dayan would later join the Ratz and Meretz political parties.

== Awards and recognition ==
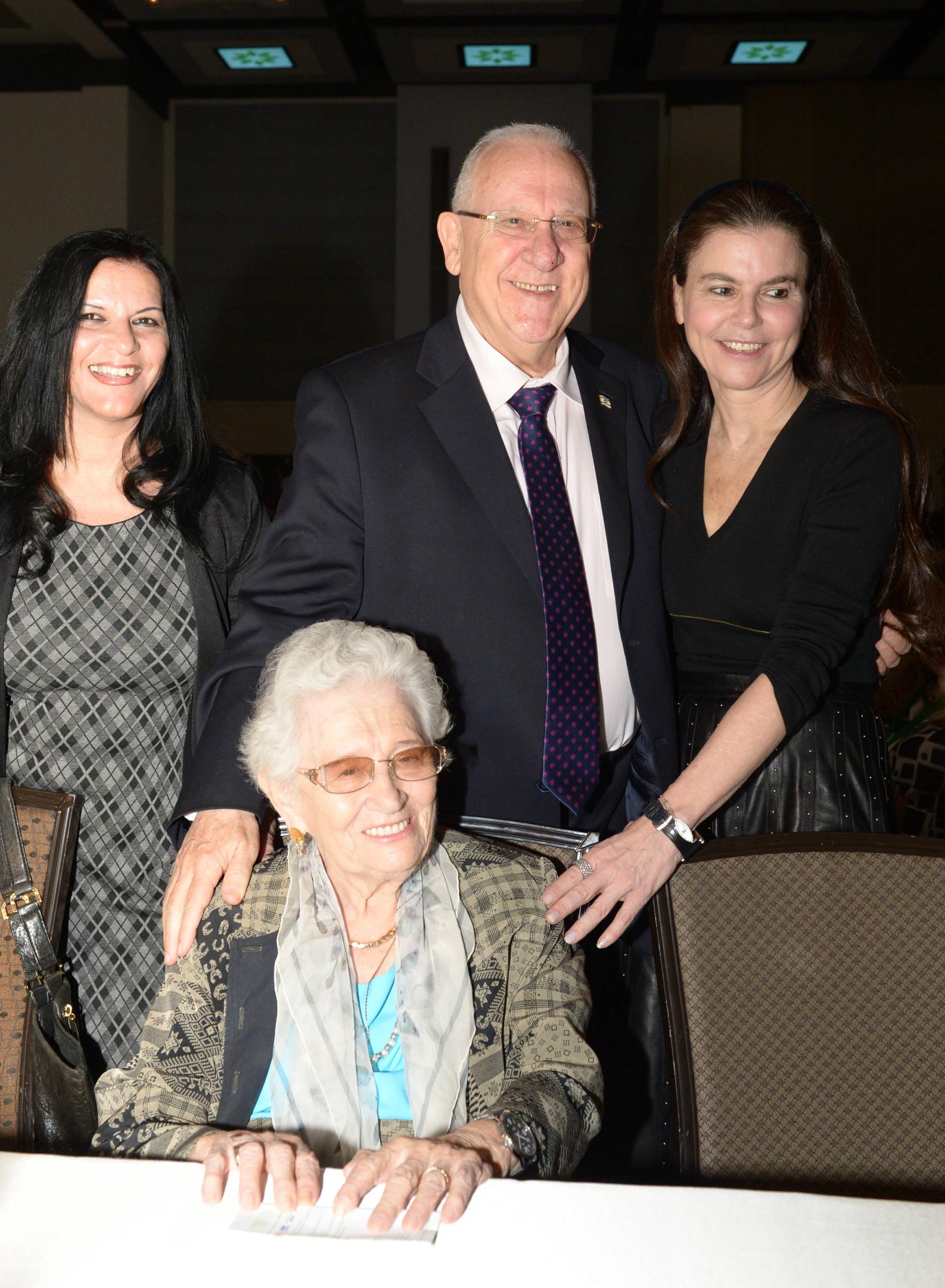
Ruth Dayan with President Reuven Rivlin, 2014

Dayan received many awards including the 2007 Partner of Peace Award from the Neve Shalom/Wahat al-Salam community, a cooperative village of Jews and Arabs midway between Jerusalem and Tel Aviv. She was also a recipient of the Yigal Allon Prize, President's Medal of Distinction, the Solomon Bublick Award from the Hebrew University, and an honorary doctorate from the Ben-Gurion University of the Negev. In 2010, Dayan was awarded honorary citizenship by the Israeli town of Herzliya.

== Published works ==
- Dayan, Ruth (1969). National Crafts Among Israelis & Arabs: One Path to Peace: at the ICA Auditorium, Nash House. Anglo-Israel association.
- Dayan, Ruth; Dudman, Helga (1973). ... Or did I dream a dream? The story of Ruth Dayan. London: Steimatzky's Agency / Weidenfeld and Nicolson. ISBN 0-297-76525-6. OCLC 724724.
- Dayan, Ruth; Feinberg, Wilburt (1974). Crafts of Israel. New York: Macmillan. ISBN 0-02-534420-X. OCLC 802820.
- David, Anthony (2015). An improbable friendship: the remarkable lives of Israeli Ruth Dayan and Palestinian Raymonda Tawil and their forty-year peace mission. New York: Arcade Publishing. ISBN 978-1-62872-631-2. OCLC 919874906.

== See also ==
- Women of Israel
- Israeli fashion
- Culture of Israel
