= Shiraz Tal =

Israeli fashion model (born 1974)

- Born: שירז טל; October 13, 1974 (age 51); Netanya, Israel
- Children: 2
- Modeling information
- Height: 5 ft 10 in (178 cm)
- Hair color: Black
- Eye color: Green

Shiraz Tal (Hebrew: שירז טל; born October 13, 1974) is an Israeli fashion model.

== Biography ==
Tal began her modeling career at age 15 in Paris, after being discovered by the Image Models modeling agency of Israel. She is best known for her work as a model in Armani Exchange advertisements, and was also featured in the spring/summer 2000 Louis Vuitton campaign and advertisements for Louis Feraud from 1999 to 2001.

Tal appeared in "Elle TopModel" issue #19 on the cover and has walked the runway for Chanel, Valentino, Paco Rabanne, Yves Saint Laurent, Kenzo, Michael Kors, Giorgio Armani and Isaac Mizrahi.

She appeared on the October 1996 cover of ELLE Magazine in the United States.

In 2003, she was selected by Hanes as their pioneer top model in an effort to compete with the Calvin Klein brand. She has also modelled for Victoria's Secret, Versace, Dolce & Gabbana, Gucci, and other fashion outlets.

She is currently signed to Premier Model Management London, City Models Paris and Louisa Models Munich.

Tal acted in the 2003 movie Pgisha Iveret (Blind Date). In 2005, she competed in Rokdim Im Kokhavim, the Israeli version of Dancing with the Stars. She also served as a judge on the first season of Israel's Next Top Model, and was the host and judge of Project Runway Israel in 2009.

== Personal life ==
Tal was married briefly and in December 2006 gave birth to her son.

Tal is currently completing a master's degree in the history of Israel at Ben Gurion University.

== See also ==
- Israeli fashion
