= Gottex =

Israeli swimwear manufacturer

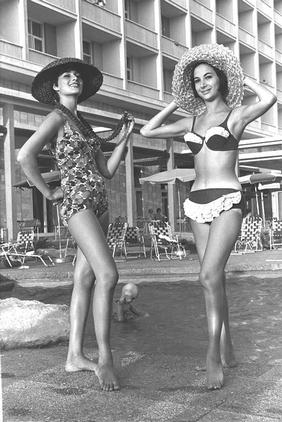
- Type: Private
- Industry: Fashion
- Founded: 1956 in Tel Aviv, Israel
- Founder: Lea Gottlieb
- Headquarters: Or Yehuda, Israel
- Area served: Worldwide
- Key people: Nir Shammay (CEO)
- Products: Swimwear, beachwear, resortwear
- Brands: Gottex; Profile by Gottex; Luma; Au Natural; Gottex Modest; Free Sport; Flirtt; Gottex Kids; Turkiz; Simply
- Owner: Joey Schwebel and Hanan Alituv
- Number of employees: 650
- Website: gottex.com (US); gottex.co.il (Israel); gottexswim.com (Europe)

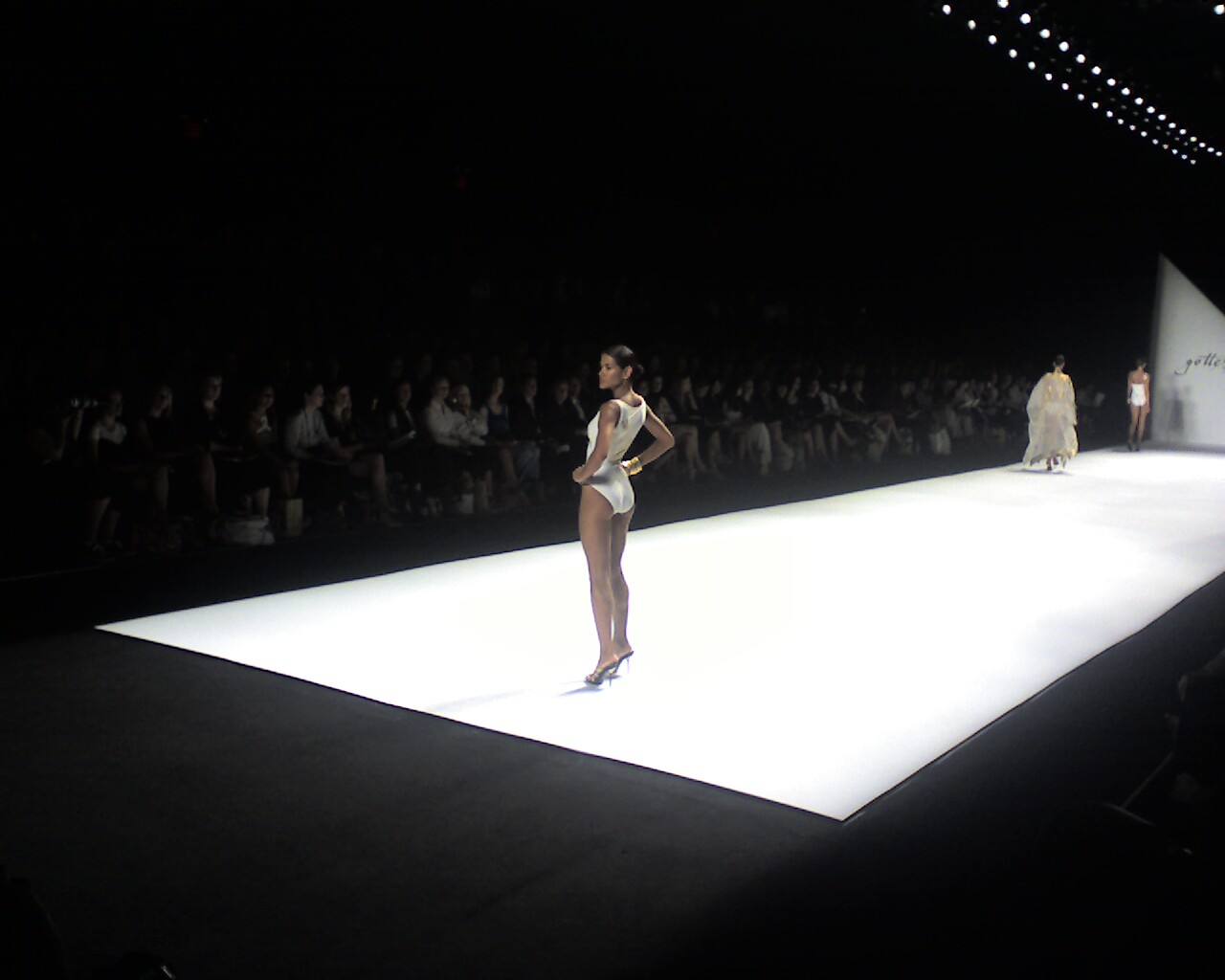
Gottex collection, 2007, at New York Fashion Week

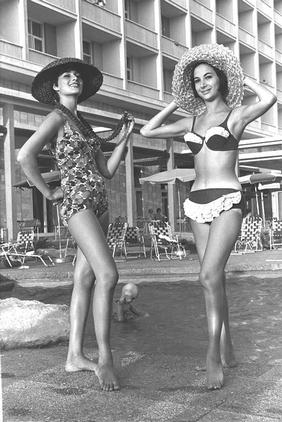
Gottex swimsuits, 1961

Gottex is an Israeli goods designer swimwear manufacturer based in Tel Aviv.

== History ==
Gottex was founded in Tel Aviv, Israel, in 1956 by Lea Gottlieb, who headed the design team until 1998. She adapted her expertise as a raincoat manufacturer to create a pioneering swimsuit company.

She sold her wedding ring for capital, bought fabric, borrowed a sewing machine and began to design swimsuits that were unique to Israel, inspired by the local Middle-Eastern light and colors: "the aqua of the Mediterranean, the golden yellow of the desert, the blue of Lake Tiberias, the pink of Jerusalem stone and the greens of the Galilee."

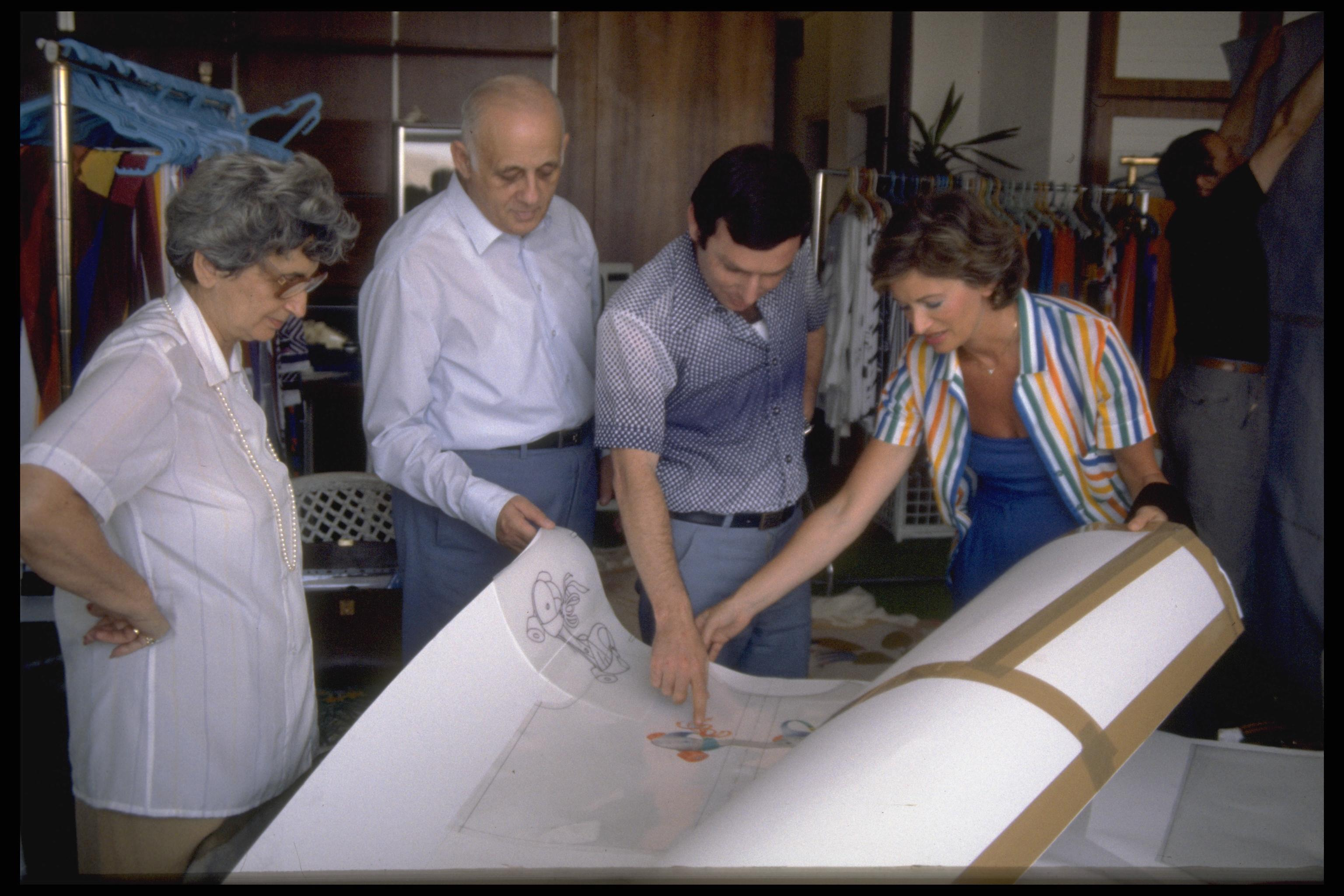
Lea Gottlieb at the Gottex factory

During the German occupation of Hungary, Gottlieb was forced to move with her husband and daughters from one hiding place to another. To avoid being recognized as a Jew when passing through checkpoints, she used to tuck her head in a bouquet of flowers. She said that the flower motifs in her designs were a tribute to the flowers that saved her life.

In Gottlieb's vision, Gottex collections can be worn "from pool to the bar", and then to a restaurant or cocktail parties. In addition to swimsuits, Gottex produces caftans, tunics and trousers, combining swimwear and beachwear. Gottex is a pioneer of swimsuits with hard-cup bras. Gottex is known for using innovative fabrics. It was the first manufacturer to introduce spandex.

In 1975, she was contacted by the fashion houses of Yves St. Laurent and Pierre Cardin, which sought to manufacture her swimsuits under their names. Instead, she expanded into men's and children's swimwear, bed linens, towels and drapes.

By the 1980s, Gottex swimsuits were being worn by Diana, Princess of Wales, Spain's Queen Sofia, Elizabeth Taylor, and Brooke Shields.

In 1997, Gottex was acquired by the Lev Leviev of the Africa-Israel Group. Lea Gottlieb ran the design department for another year and then left to start another fashion company under her own name at the age of 85, where she worked until she was 90.

In 1993, Gottex was America's top swimsuit import. According to the Israel Export Institute, exports of Israeli swimwear totaled $44 million in 1999.

In 2025, Cassey Ho brought attention to a skort that Gottex would sell in Nordstrom may have infringed on her Popflex's Pirouette skort design and accompanying patents. Gottex threatened legal actions instead if she pursued “any further infringement allegations.”

== See also ==
- List of swimwear brands
- Dolfin Swimwear
- Israeli fashion
