= Ruti Zisser =

American fashion designer (born 1974)

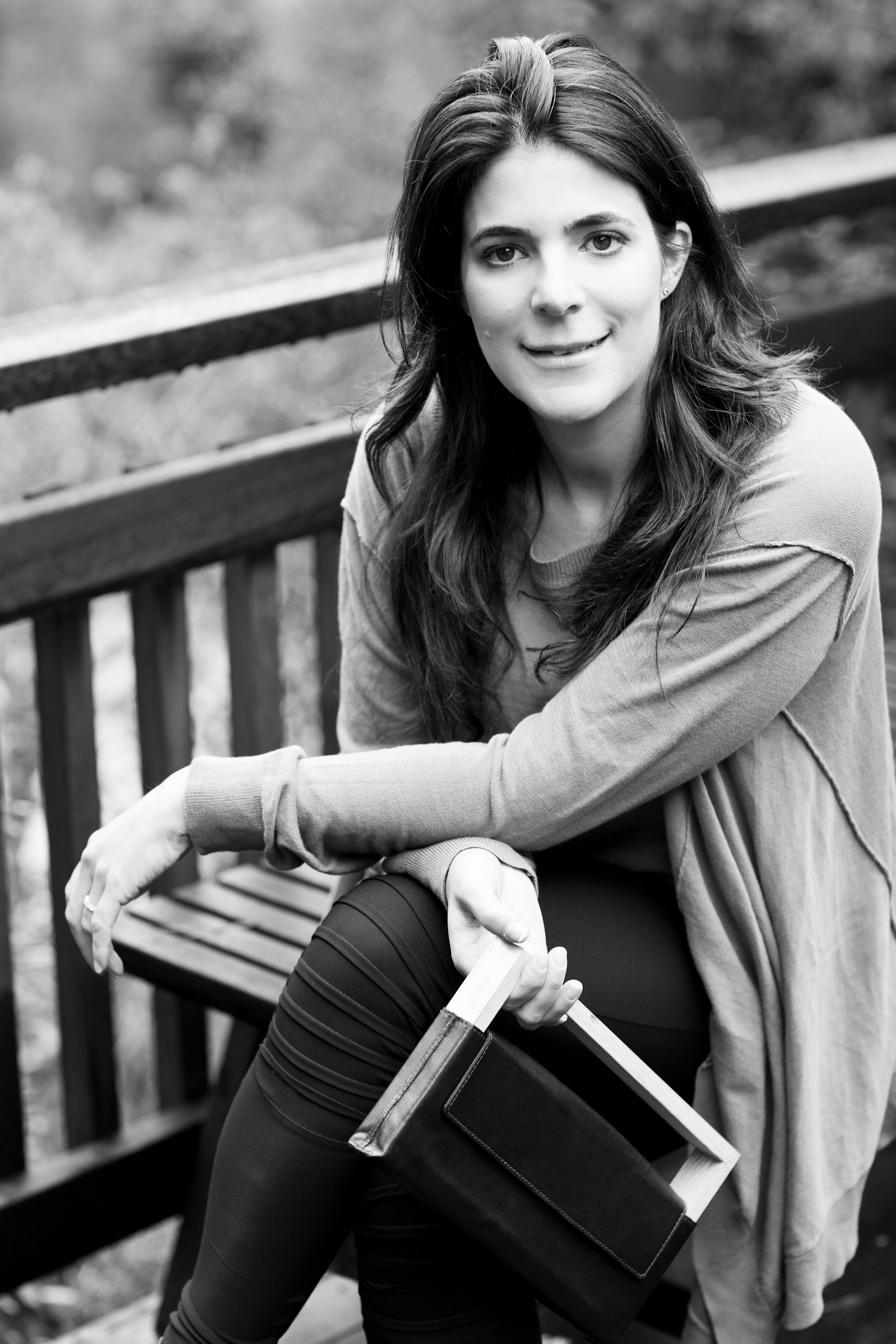
- Zisser Palo Alto 2013, portrait by photographer Lisa Deneffe
- Born: Ruti Zisser; July 21, 1974 (age 51)
- Occupations: Fashion designer, wardrobe stylist, businesswoman, fair trade activist Founder and CEO, Ruti inc.
- Children: Yoav, Tamar and Guy
- Website: ruti.com

Ruti Zisser (born July 1974) is a lifestyle designer, fashion designer, wardrobe stylist, and business woman, publicly known by her first name, Ruti Zisser is the founder of a fashion company manufacturing and distributing her designs.

== Biography ==
Ruth Zisser, Ruti, was born on July 21, 1974. In 1977 Zisser moved with her family to Brussels, Belgium and in 1982, to Munich, Germany. In 1999, Zisser immigrated to Palo Alto, California (United States), where she received a permanent residence and a citizenship in 2006.

Zisser's career didn't start in fashion. In her late twenties and early thirties, she worked in the tech industry. She self reflected that she was never satisfied and happy working in tech: "For many years I never had the courage to admit to myself, and to the people around me, that my heart was in a different place, far away from algorithms and artificial intelligence. The world of technology was not for me; I’ve always preferred the human touch." Zisser was married in 2002, and has three children, Yoav, Tamar and Guy.

== Company ==
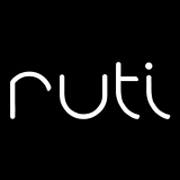
Logo

RUTI Inc. is a privately held company founded by Zisser in 2009 in her garage in Palo Alto. Zisser's company emphasizes cool, flattering and comfortable clothing for all ages. "I'm here to change your relationship with your closet. We’ve always been told that beauty hurts - that we must give up comfort in the name of style and compromise sophistication for whatever is fashionable. That’s where I come in." - Ruti Zisser

=== History ===
The first RUTI retail location opened on October 5, 2009, in Palo Alto. The second boutique opened on Fillmore Street, in San Francisco and was designed by Nicole Hollis, a San Francisco-based interior designer. The Santa Monica store was the third boutique to open, and is designed by Karina Tollman and Philipp Thomanek from Israel. The 4th RUTI boutique to open was the Berkeley store on 4th St. The Venice store opened on vibrant Abbot Kinney street in 2013. Taking the success of their brick-and-mortar boutiques online, RUTI launched an eCommerce website in late 2014. In 2016, RUTI opened a new HQ office and showroom in Belmont, CA where all development and design for the RUTI label takes place. In an effort to continue the direct to consumer strategy, new boutiques are expected to open in Scottsdale, Miami and Seattle in 2018.
