= Floppy hat =

Floppy hat may refer to:

- Cloche hat
- Sun hat
