= Bush hat =

Bush hat can mean any of the following:

- Slouch hat
- Boonie hat
- Bucket hat
