= Patrol cap =

Soft cap worn by military personnel in the field

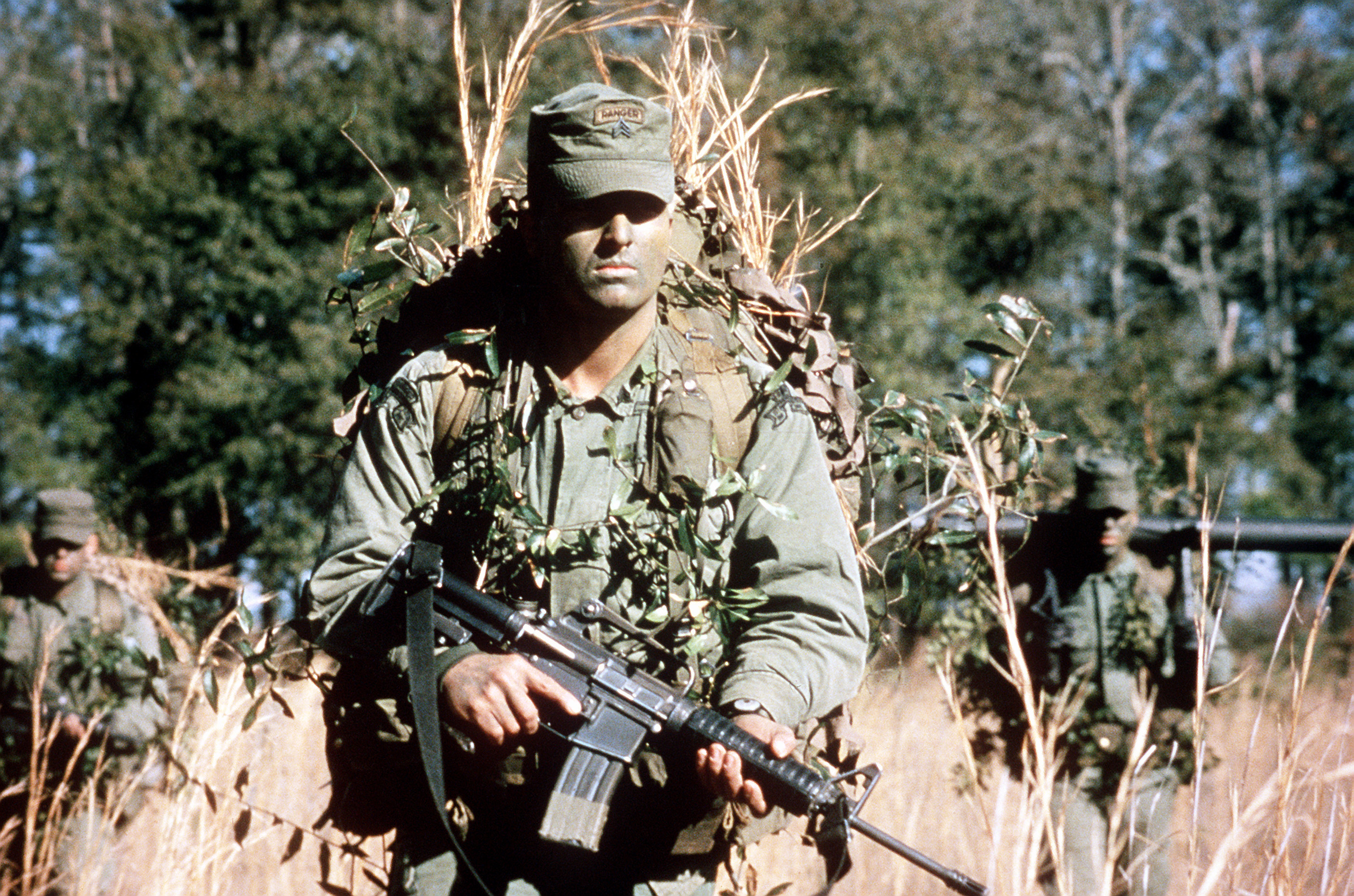
U.S. Army Rangers wearing "Ranger Roll" patrol caps, 1986

A patrol cap, also known as a field cap or soft cap, is a soft kepi constructed similarly to a baseball cap, with a stiff, rounded visor but featuring a flat top, worn by military personnel of some countries in the field when a combat helmet is not required.

== History ==
=== U.S. Military ===
==== M1951 Field Cap and Ridgeway Cap ====
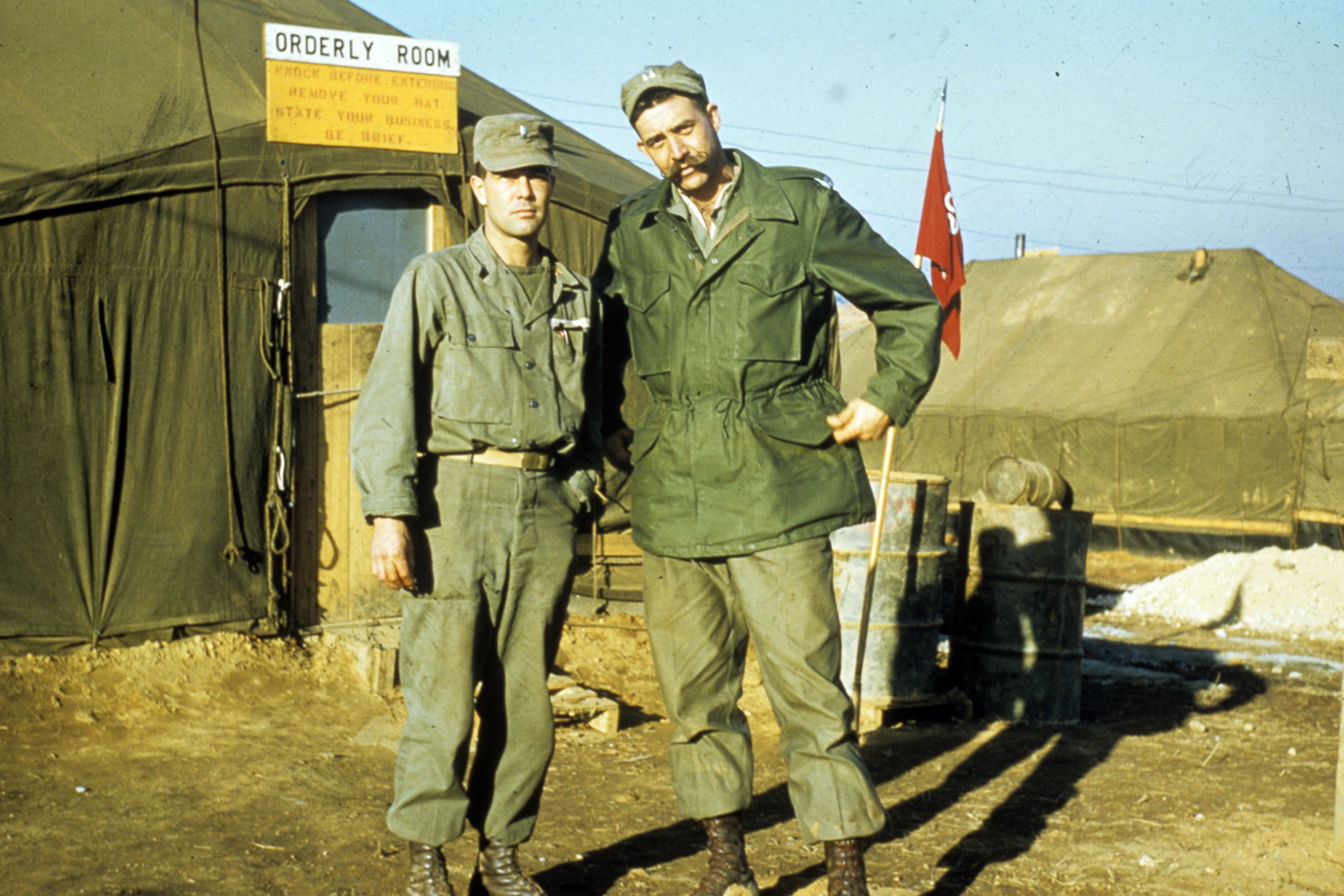
Two officers wearing the M1951 Field Cap-Anyang South Korea, Lt. Green and Captain Ray

The M1951 Field Cap, introduced with the M1951 Uniform, was a derivative of the M1943 Field Cap, part of the M1943 Uniform. The M1951 cap was worn in the Korean War, where it became known as the "patrol cap" by the US Army Rangers there. It was constructed of wind-resistant olive-drab cotton poplin, and had a flannel wool panel that folded down to cover the ears and the back of the head. It was soft enough to be worn underneath an M1 helmet.

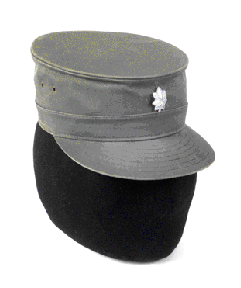
M1951 Ridgeway Cap

During the Korean War, the cap was replaced by the Ridgway Cap (named for General Matthew Ridgway), a stiffened version of the M1951 made by Falcon or Louisville Cap Company and known as the "Jump-Up" or "Spring-Up" cap. The hat became famous outside America after being worn by Fidel Castro. The patrol cap was replaced altogether in 1962 with a baseball-like "Cap, Field (Hot Weather)"; during the Vietnam War in-country troops were issued the boonie hat from 1967.

In 1980, the Army introduced the Battle Dress Uniform (BDU), which featured a patrol cap similar to the M1951 Field Cap, including the wool panel to cover the ears, except it was in Woodland camouflage. The BDU was replaced, starting in 2004, with the Army Combat Uniform (ACU).

Starting on June 14, 2001, Army Chief of Staff General Eric Shinseki made the black beret the standard headgear for Soldiers in the garrison environment, with the exception of Airborne, Ranger and Special Forces units, which had been authorized to wear their own unique berets since the early 1980s. On June 14, 2011, the M1951/ACU soft patrol cap became once again the primary headgear for all Soldiers as the duty uniform headgear after a 10-year hiatus in favor of the beret, according to Army Directive 2001-11.

==== Modern patrol caps ====
In 1981, following the introduction of the M81 Battle Dress Uniform, the patrol cap was reintroduced. The patrol cap continues to be worn with the Army Combat Uniform, introduced in 2004. The materials are 50% cotton, 50% nylon blend. It has been available in different variants and patterns, such as hot weather models which have eliminated the ear flaps. Patrol caps are frequently modified with a "Ranger Roll", inspired by a common practice by U.S. Army Rangers in the 75th Ranger Regiment, in which the sides of the cap are rolled downward, removing the rigid "flat" top; though this is against regulations. Other unauthorized, but common styles of wear include the "Duckbill", the "MLB" and the "Wash and Wear".

Patterns have included US Woodland, Six color desert camouflage (DBDU), Three color desert camouflage (DCU), Universal Camouflage Pattern (UCP), and Operational Camouflage Pattern (OCP). The ACU patrol cap features a velcro-backed patch on the back with the soldier's name printed on it and a small internal pocket, the soldier's rank insignia is pinned on the front, as seen in the image below.

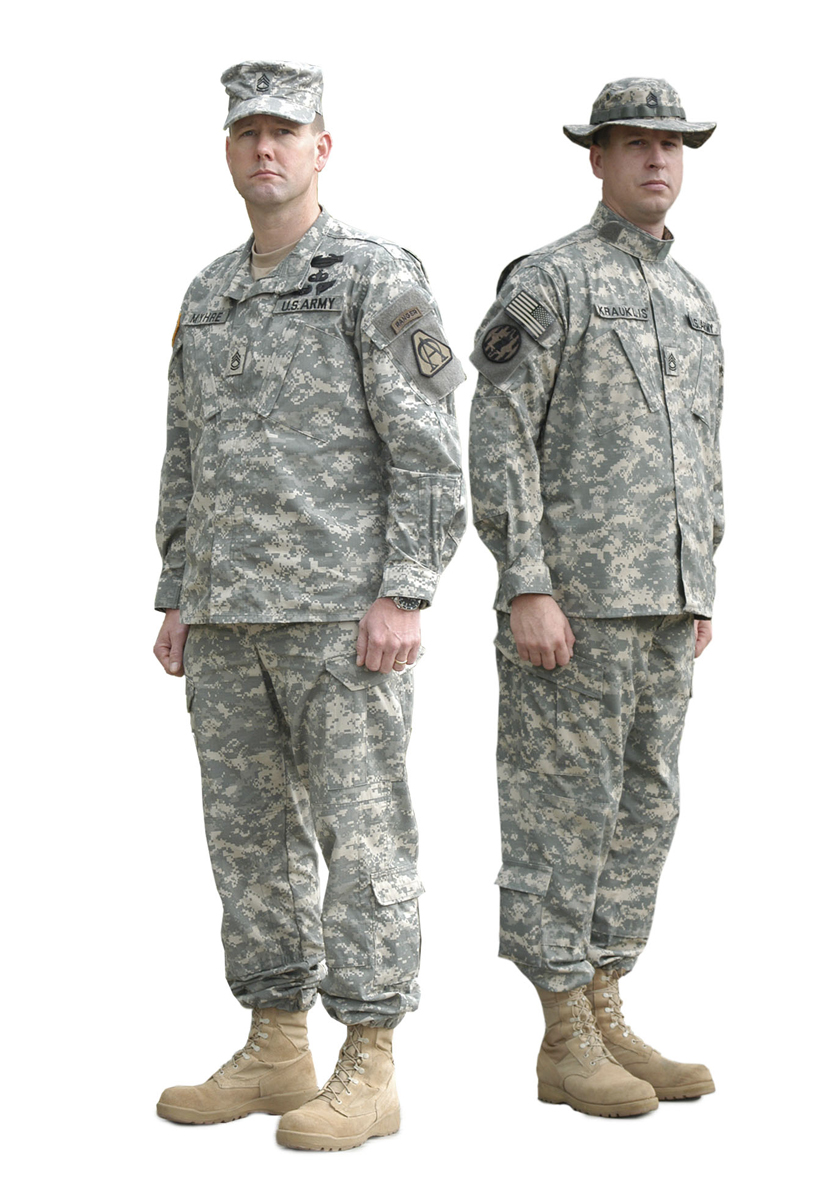
Two soldiers wearing the ACU, as well as a patrol cap (left) and boonie hat (right), both in the Universal Camouflage Pattern

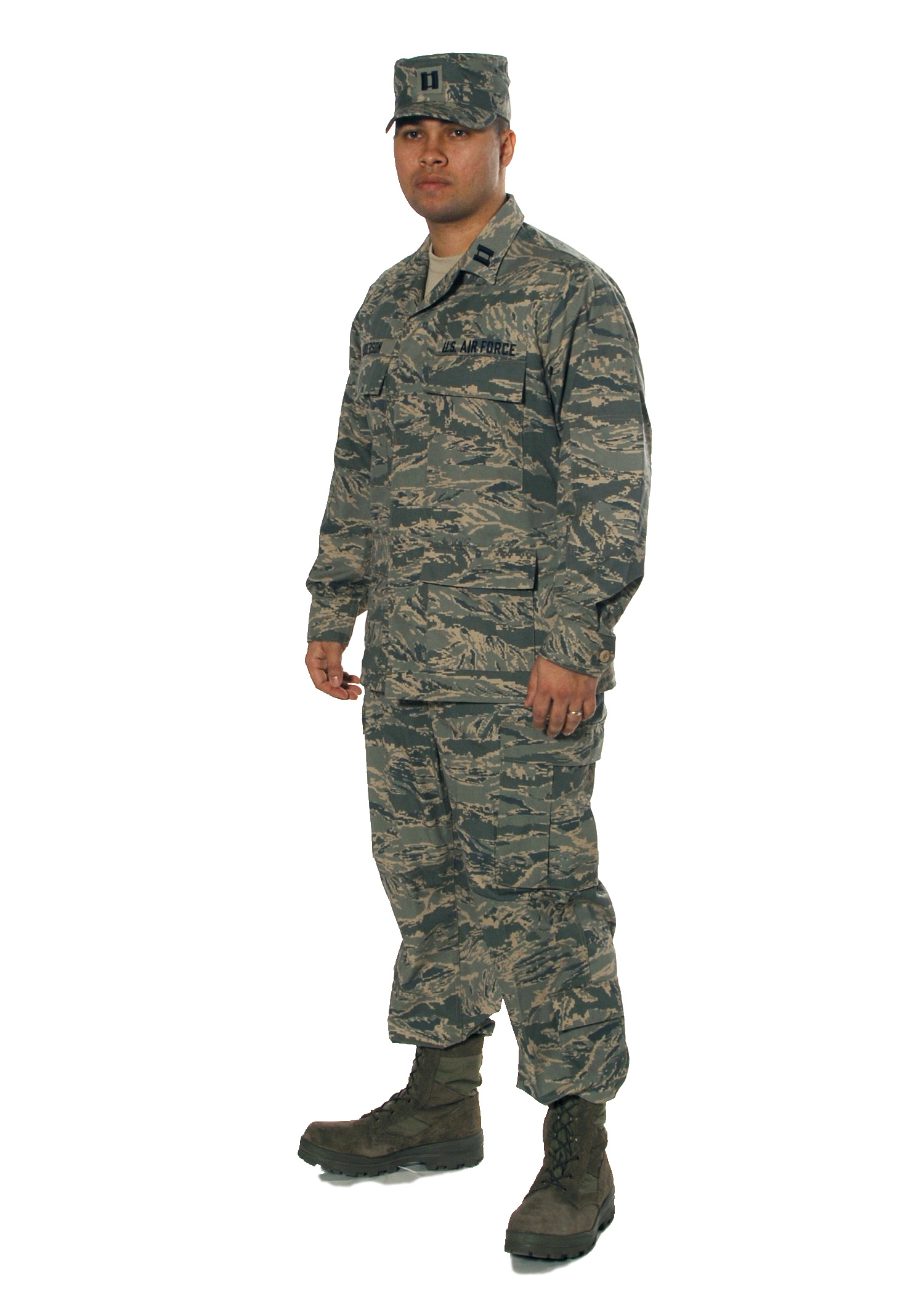
USAF Captain wearing Airman Battle Uniform with digital tigerstripe-patterned patrol cap

=== Cuban Revolutionary Armed Forces ===
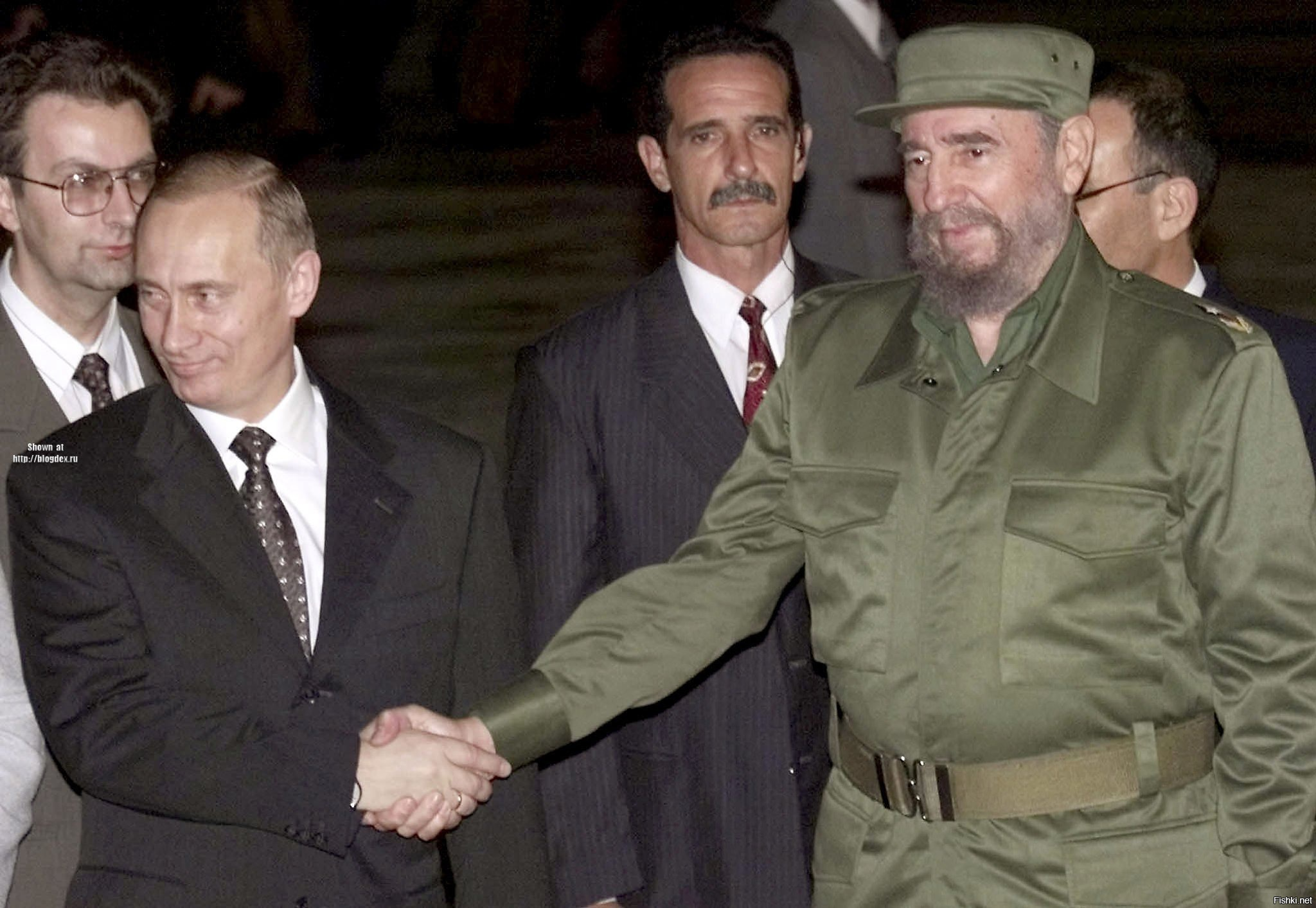
Former President of Cuba Fidel Castro meeting President of Russia Vladimir Putin while wearing a solid color olive drab Cuban Revolutionary Armed Forces uniform with a patrol cap in December 2000

The Ridgeway Cap, a stiffened version of the M1951 Patrol Cap made famous after being worn by Fidel Castro, is a standard issue cap in the Cuban Revolutionary Army, and Cuban Revolutionary Air and Air Defense Force. American style patrol caps were worn by Cuban soldiers before, and during the Cuban Revolution. After the Revolution, the patrol cap kept being issued to Cuban military personnel. It is most commonly seen in solid color olive drab, but Cuban patrol caps with camouflage patterns like the grey lizard pattern have been made.

=== Russia ===
The Russian army adopted the patrol cap when it adopted the woodland pattern Flora camouflage and then EMR camouflage VKBO uniforms in the early 2000s. There are two versions, a plain one worn by conscripts and a more elaborate one worn by kontrakniki and officers.

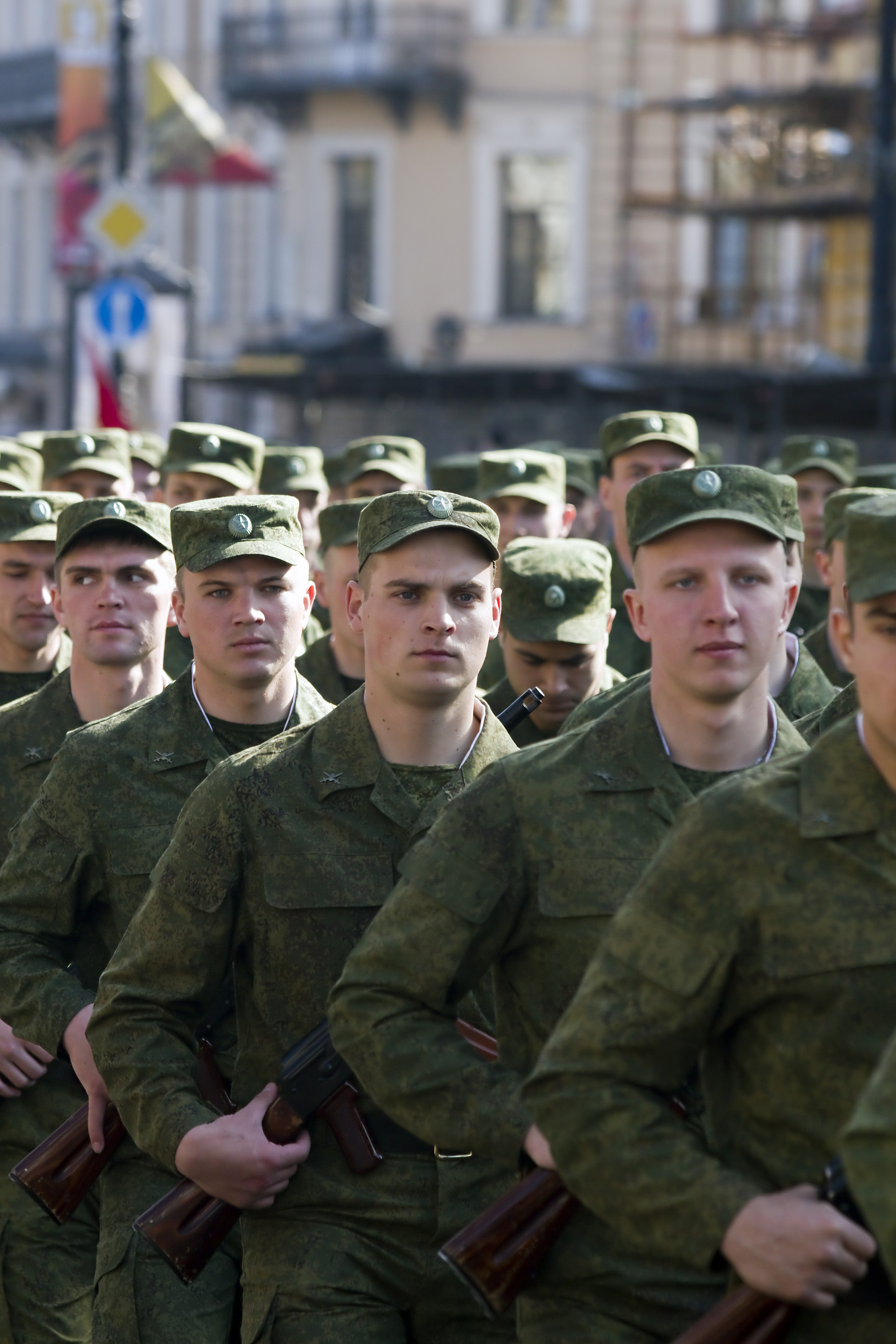
Russian soldiers wearing the initial plain patrol cap on Victory Day 2011 in St Petersburg

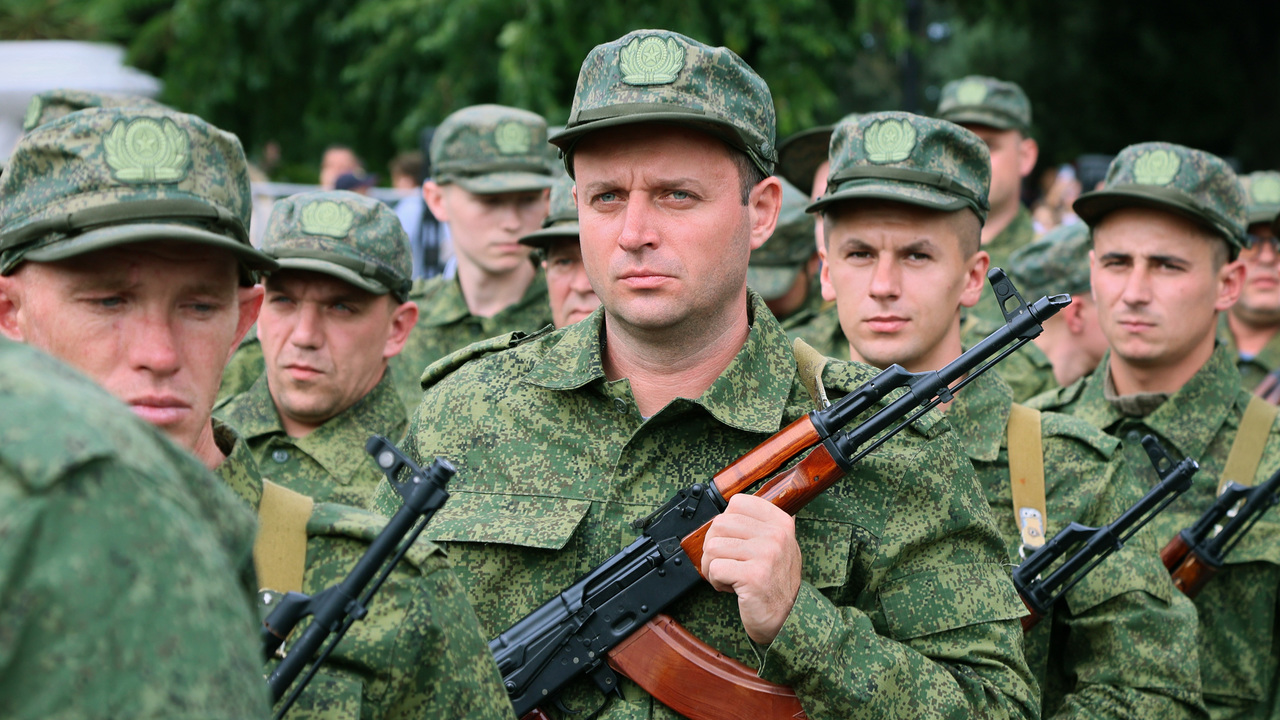
Russian troops, wearing the second more elaborate style of patrol cap, during 2022 Russian mobilization in Sevastopol's Nakhimov Square

== See also ==
- List of hat styles
- Utility cover, the U.S. Navy and Marine Corps equivalent
- Side cap
- Jeep cap
- Headgear of the United States Army
