= Wales bucket hat =

Welsh football memorabilia

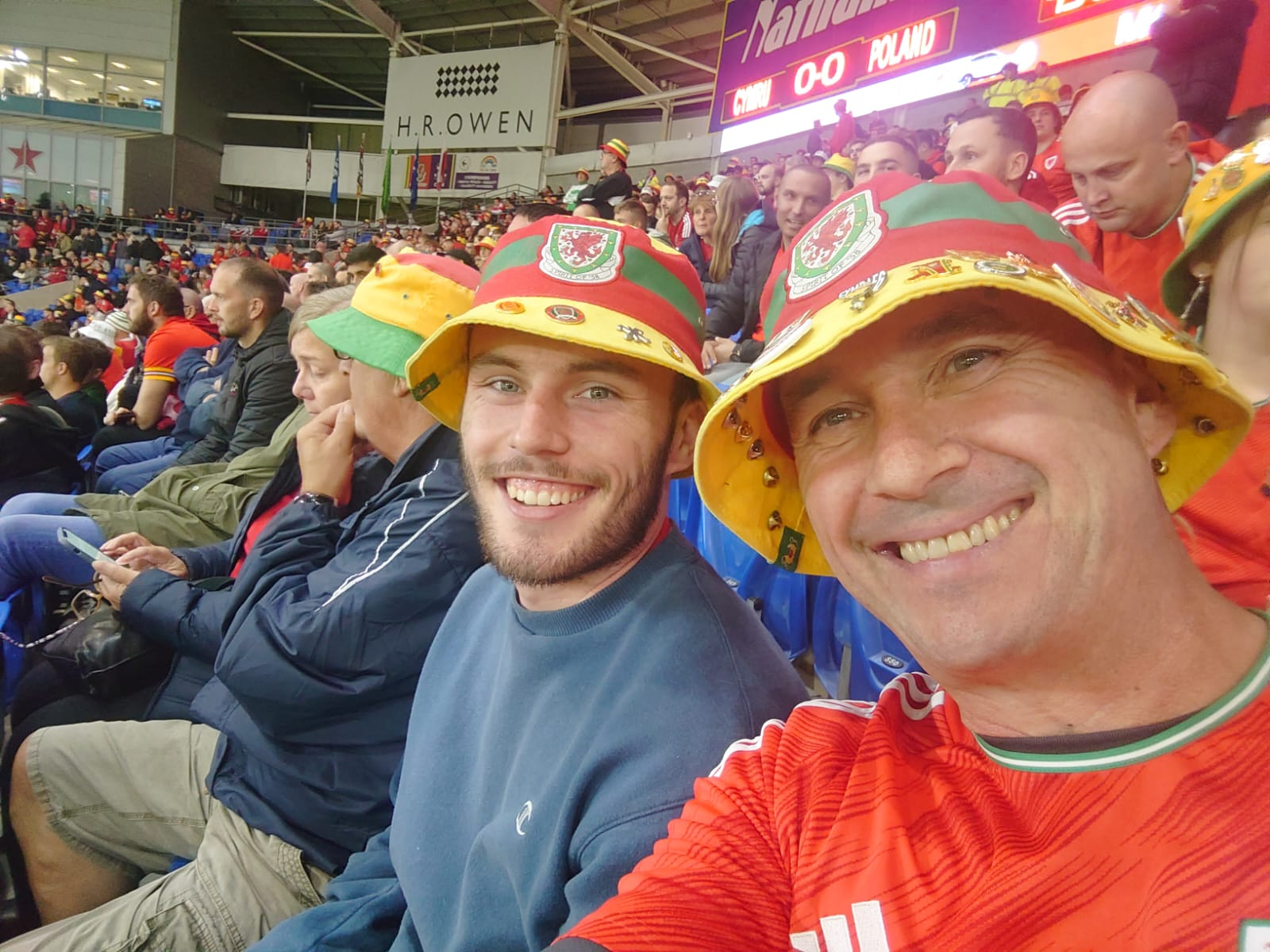
Wales football fans wearing bucket hats

The Wales bucket hat (Welsh: het bwced Cymru) is a colourful bucket hat worn by supporters particularly of the Wales national football team. The hat was originally red, yellow and green, designed by Spirit of '58. It initially gained wide popularity during Wales's participation in the UEFA Euro 2016 championships. Other designs of the bucket hat have subsequently become available. Giant versions of the bucket hats were placed in city centres around Wales during the 2022 FIFA World Cup.

== Background ==
Until 2022, Wales had not qualified for the football World Cup tournament since 1958, where they had lost in the quarter finals to the eventual winners, Brazil. The team subsequently had little success, with a low point being reached in the 1990s when only 11 fans travelled to Georgia and then Finland to watch their team play. However, by 2016 they had found new confidence, qualifying for the EURO 2016 championships, reaching the semi-finals and receiving an 'outstanding contribution' award from UEFA.

== Spirit of '58 ==
North Wales football fan, Tim Williams, had been following the Wales national team across Europe and noticed that the only items available for fans to wear were the replica Wales football kits. In 2010 he created a company in his spare time, Spirit of '58, and began designing and distributing alternative memorabilia, shirts and the red, yellow and green bucket hat. He says the colourful hat was designed to introduce a bit of fun and was inspired by a favourite band, the Stone Roses. Others have pointed out the yellow is the colour of the daffodil (a national symbol of Wales). The merchandise celebrated Wales's new 'golden generation' of football players and renewed international success. When Wales qualified for the European Championship in 2016, business was so brisk Williams began working for his business full time. Williams sells the hats online or from his shop in Bala.

== Popularity ==
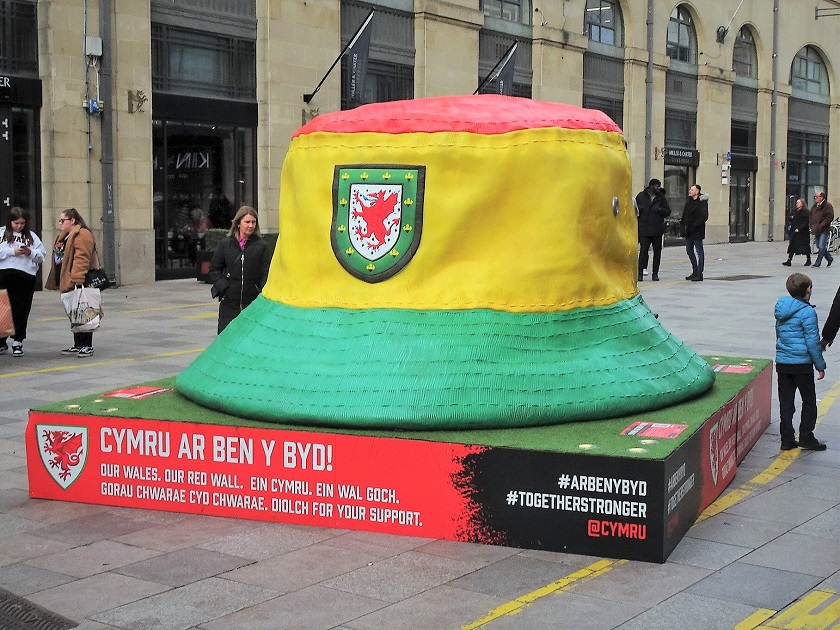
Giant bucket hat sculpture (Nov 2022) in The Hayes, Cardiff

The red, yellow and green bucket hat was often seen at overseas Wales football matches, but it first came to widespread popularity during the 2016 European football championship, where it became strongly associated with Wales supporters.

The hats were again popular around Wales's qualification for the 2020 European Championships.

=== 2022 World Cup ===
Wales qualified for the 2022 FIFA World Cup in Qatar by beating Ukraine on 5 June 2022. Sky Sports television pundits (and former Wales internationals) Danny Gabbidon and Ashley Williams immediately donned Wales bucket hats live on-air as the final whistle of the game was blown.

The bucket hat became part of the Football Association of Wales's (FAW) strategy of improving the profile of Welsh football. Five 10-foot (3.0 m) tall illuminated bucket hats were installed as public art in city and town centres across Wales, including Cardiff, Swansea, Caernarfon, Wrexham and Aberystwyth. A giant red Wales bucket hat was installed in Doha and unveiled by the FAW the day before the first Wales football match, with Wales first minister, Mark Drakeford, in attendance. BBC Wales took a large inflatable version of the Wales bucket hat on tour through Wales, including the Rhondda, Baglan, Builth Wells and Bangor.

On 21 November, fans and FAW staff, including former Welsh international football captain Laura McAllister, were told by stadium stewards to remove their rainbow bucket hats before they entered Doha's Ahmad Bin Ali Stadium for Wales's opening match against the United States. The rainbow coloured version was designed to show support for the LGBTQ+ community. In response to the incident the Football Association of Wales said that they were "extremely disappointed" by the reports and said that they would address the issue with FIFA. The rainbow hats were being made by a company based in Llanelli, RCS Teamwear, in collaboration with the FAW.

== See also ==
- List of hat styles
