= Sun hat =

Wide-brimmed hat designed to shade face and shoulders from the sun

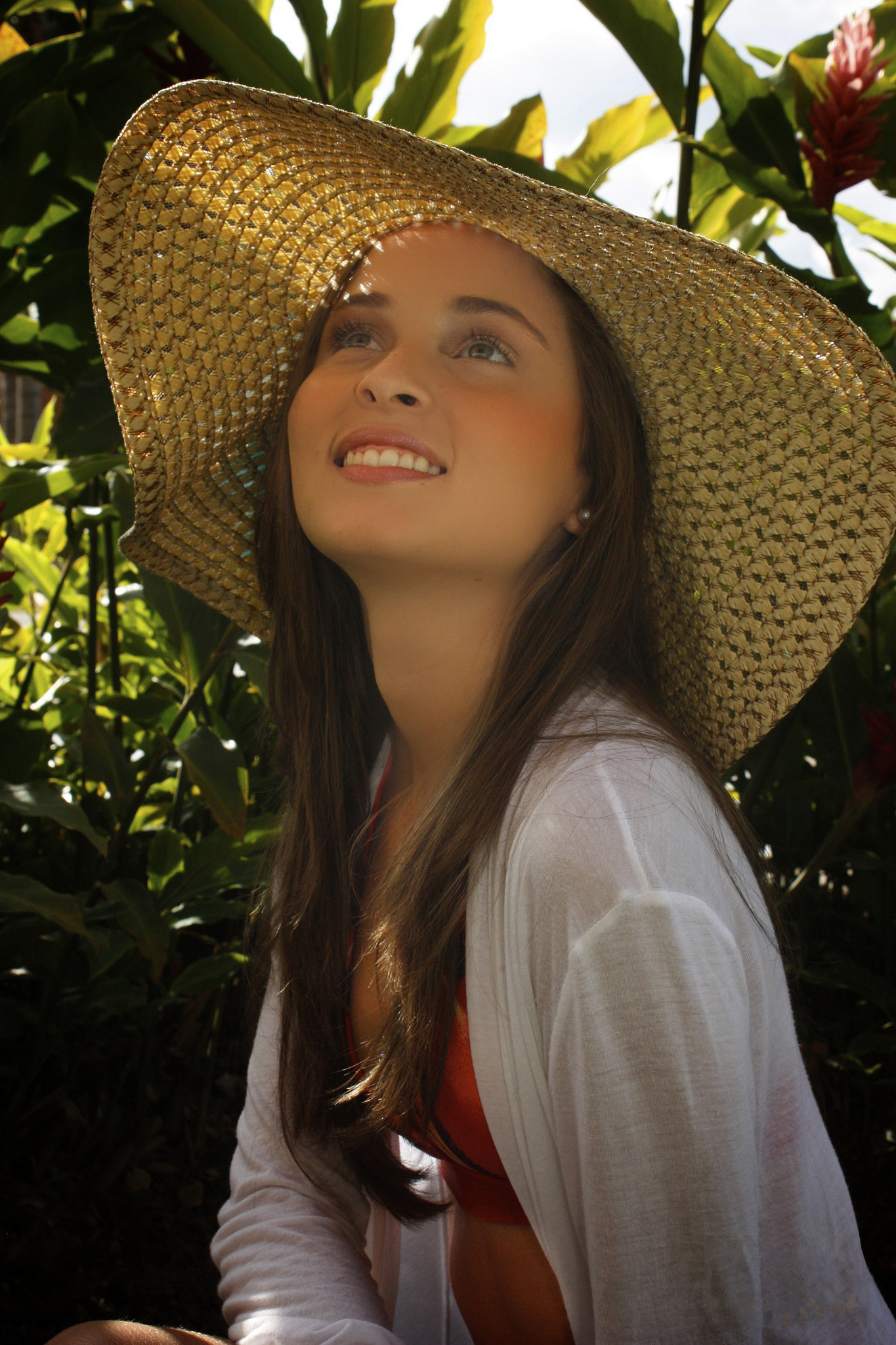
Young woman wearing a sun hat

A sun hat (also known as the floppy hat, harvest hat or field hat) is any hat or headgear specifically designed to shade the head, face, neck and shoulders from direct sunlight, usually with a circumferentially-protruding semi-rigid brim that can range from small to large, but as a general guideline around 4 to 7 in (10 to 18 cm) in width.

== Design ==
A sun hat may incorporate a variety of materials and styles, including the straw hat, cone hat, Boonie hat, and the pith helmet (sun helmet). In modern times, sun hats are common in places around the world, mainly in holiday resorts with plentiful direct sunlight, usually in tropical countries close to the Earth's equator. They are particularly useful in protecting against ultraviolet-induced sunburns and skin cancers on the face and neck.

== Gallery ==
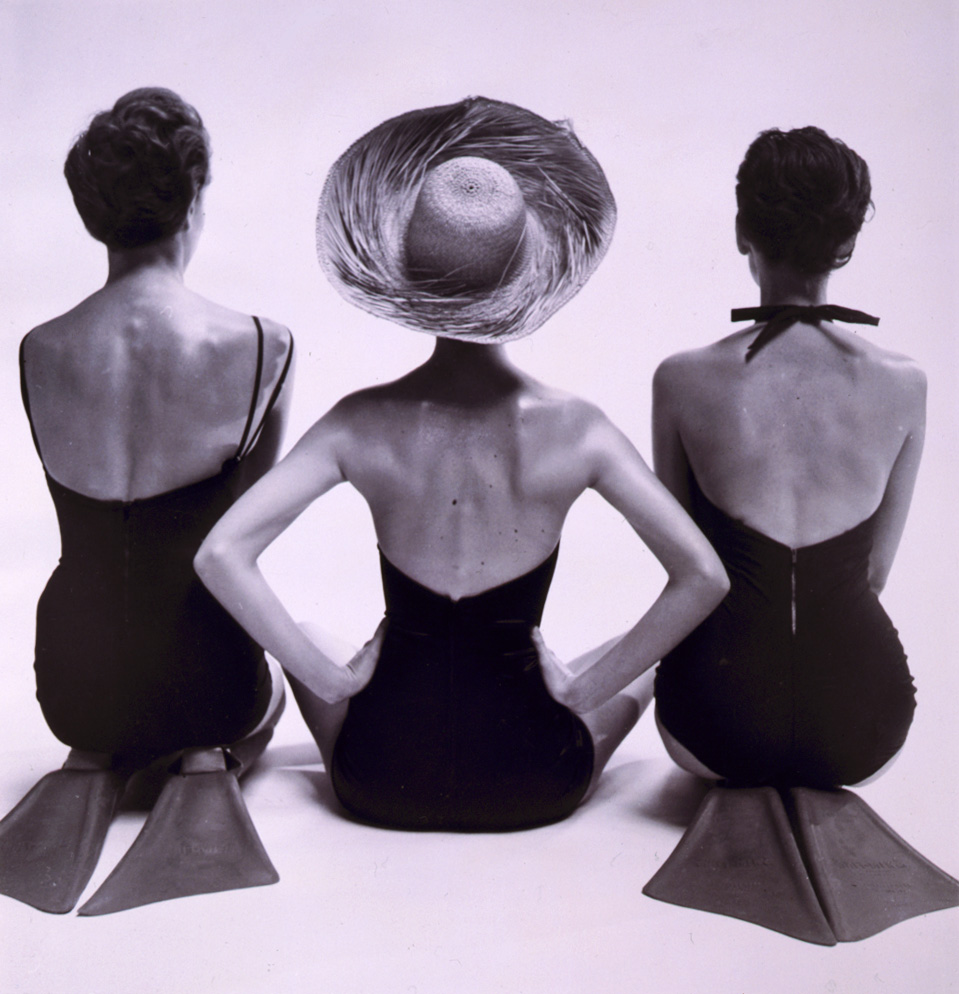
Breton (hat), 1950

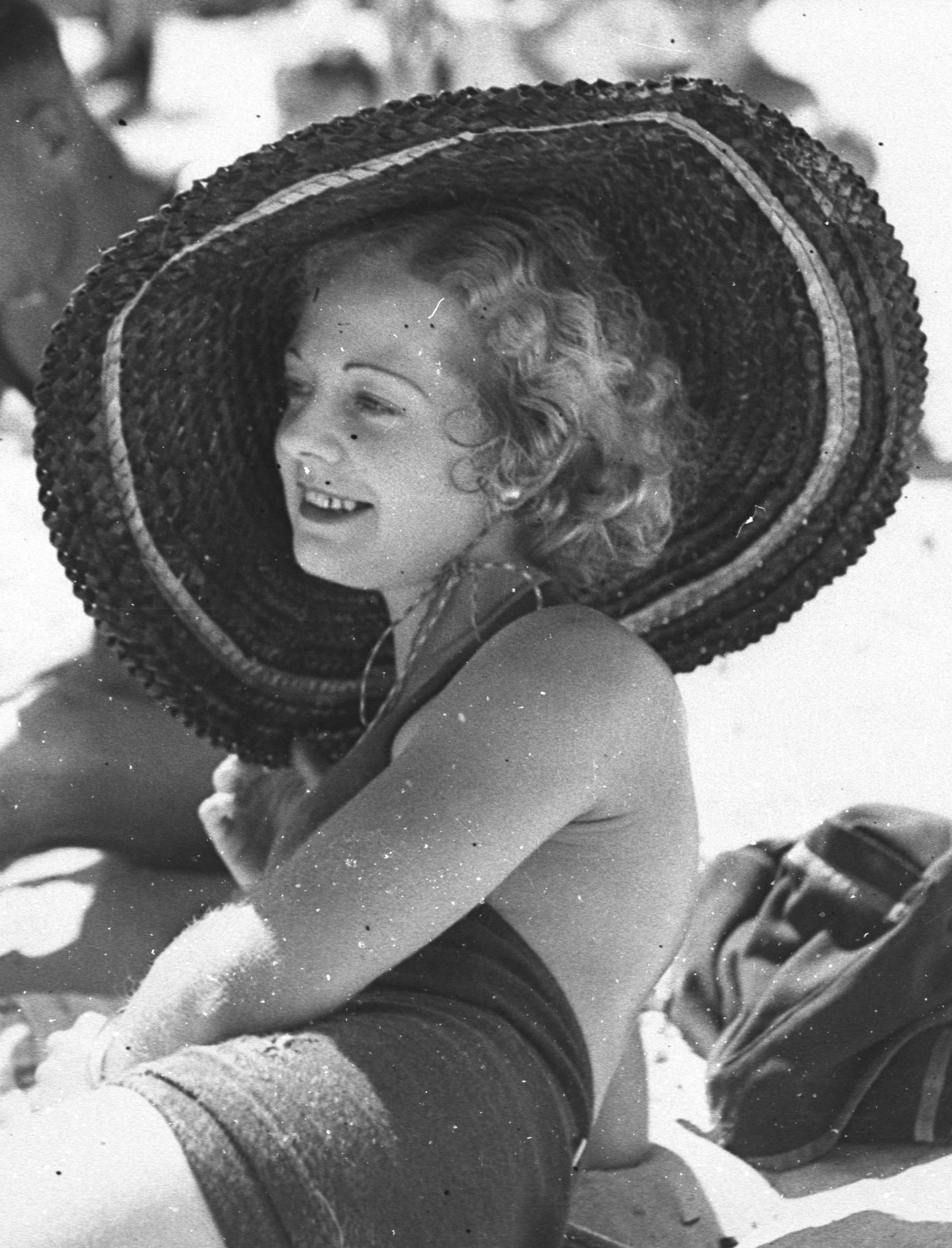
Woman in sun-hat, Bondi Beach

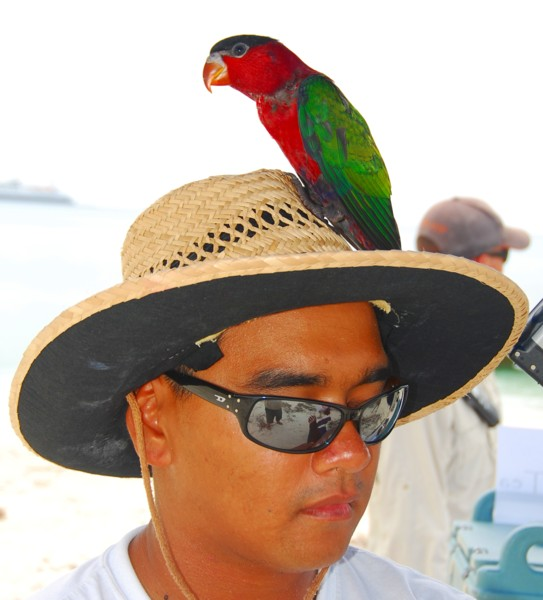

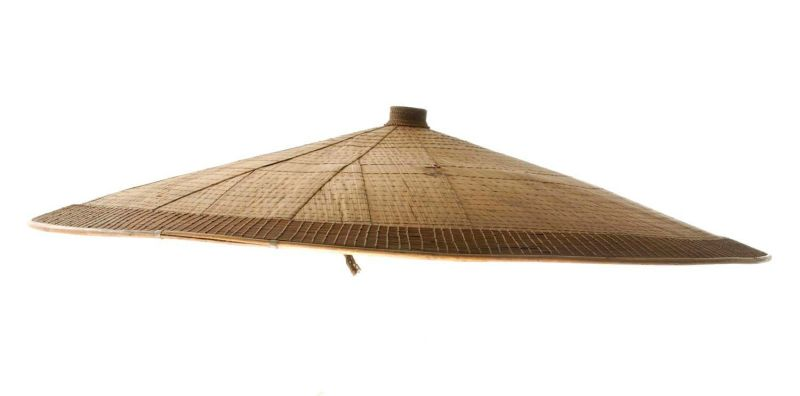
Palmleaf sun hat

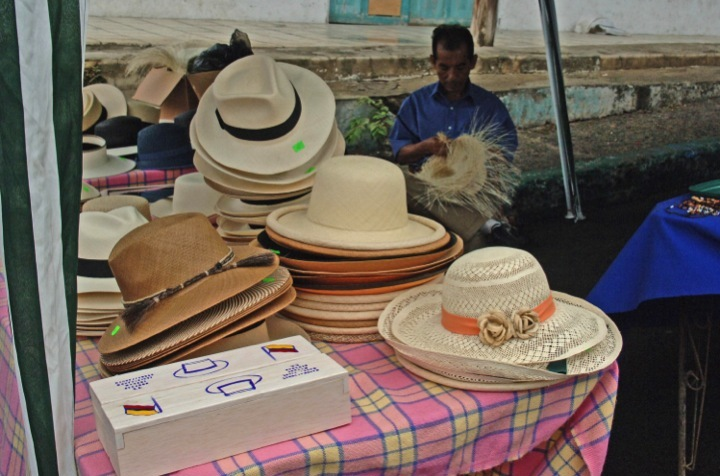
Four different types of sun hats, Ecuador

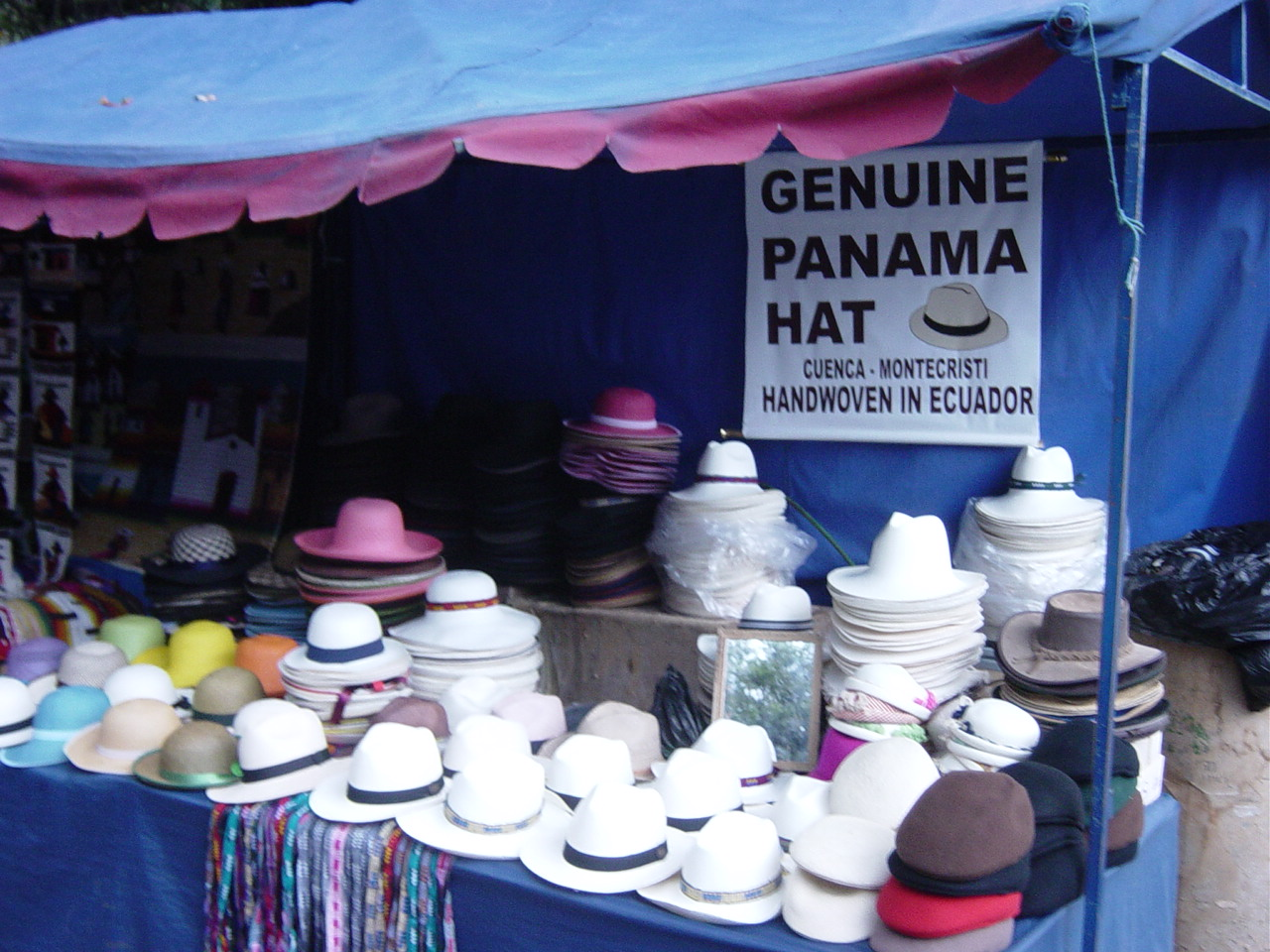
Panama hats sold on a street market in Ecuador

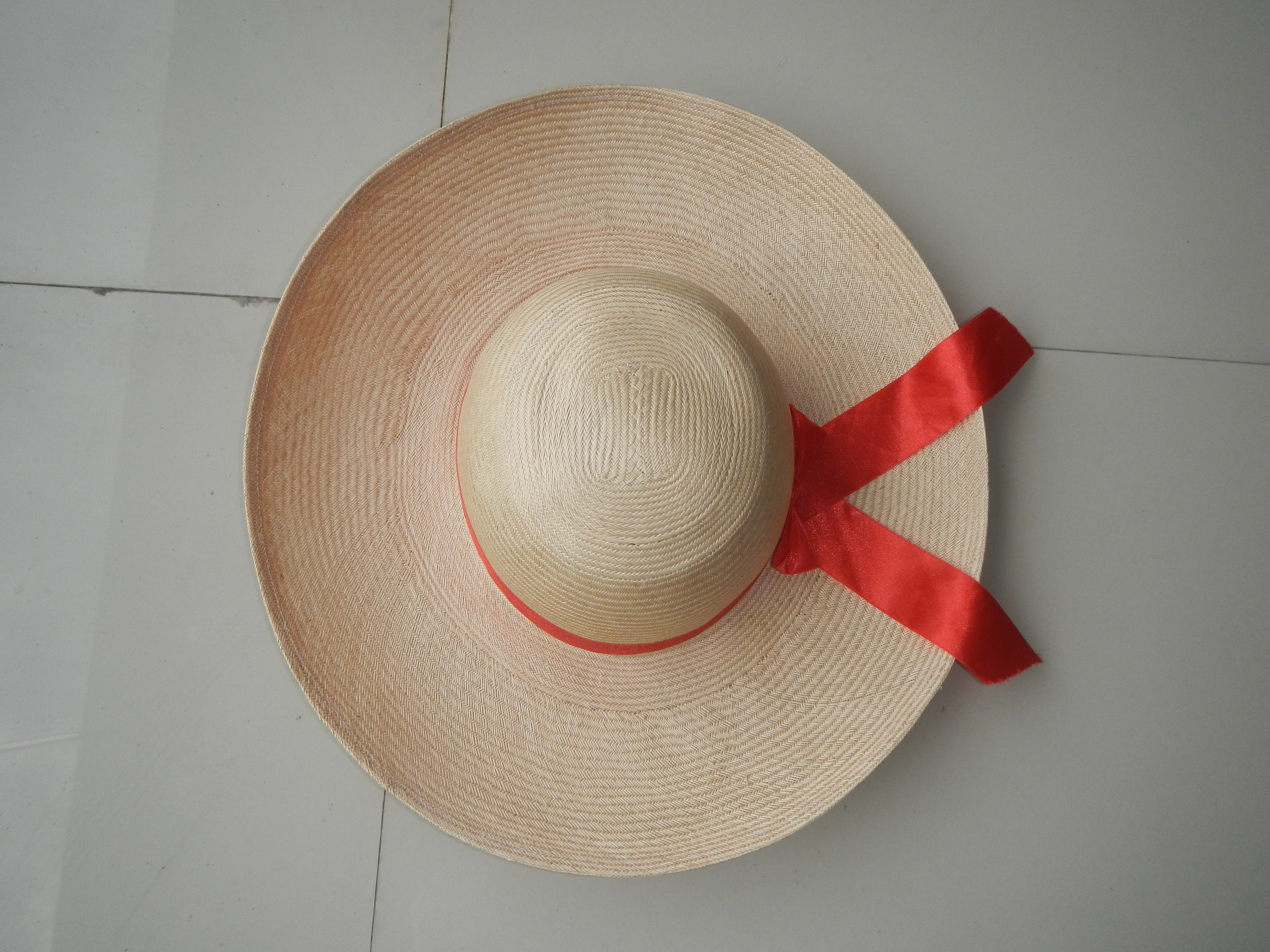
A wide-brimmed woman's baliwag hat from Baliwag, Bulacan

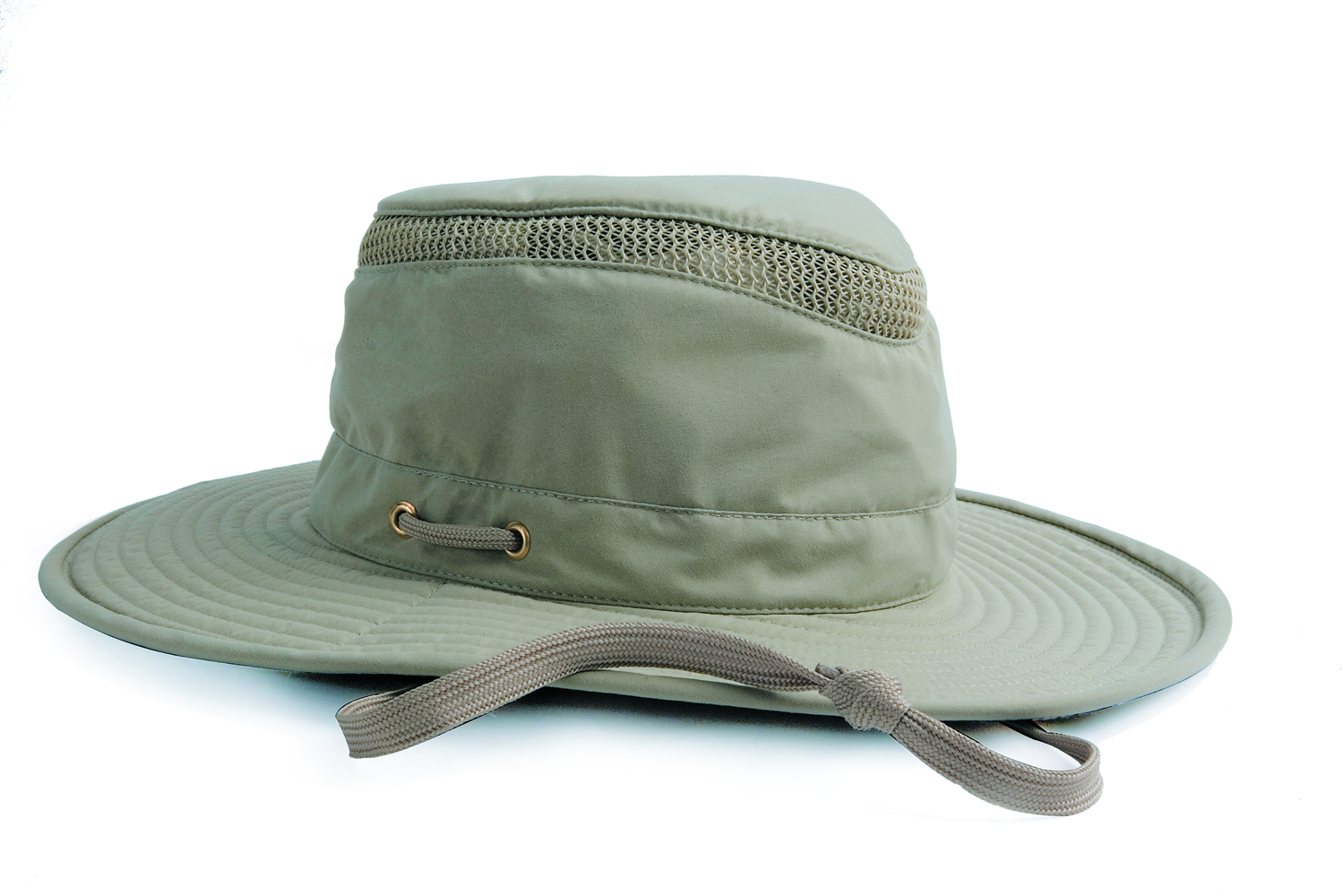

== See also ==
- List of hat styles
- Akubra
- Boater
- Breton (hat)
- Bucket hat
- Buntal hat
- Bush hat (disambiguation)
- Campaign hat
- Cowboy hat
- Legionnaire hat
- Panama hat
- Sailor hat
- Sombrero
- Sports visor
- Straw hat
