= Bucket hat =

Cloth hat with a downward-sloping brim

Bucket hat

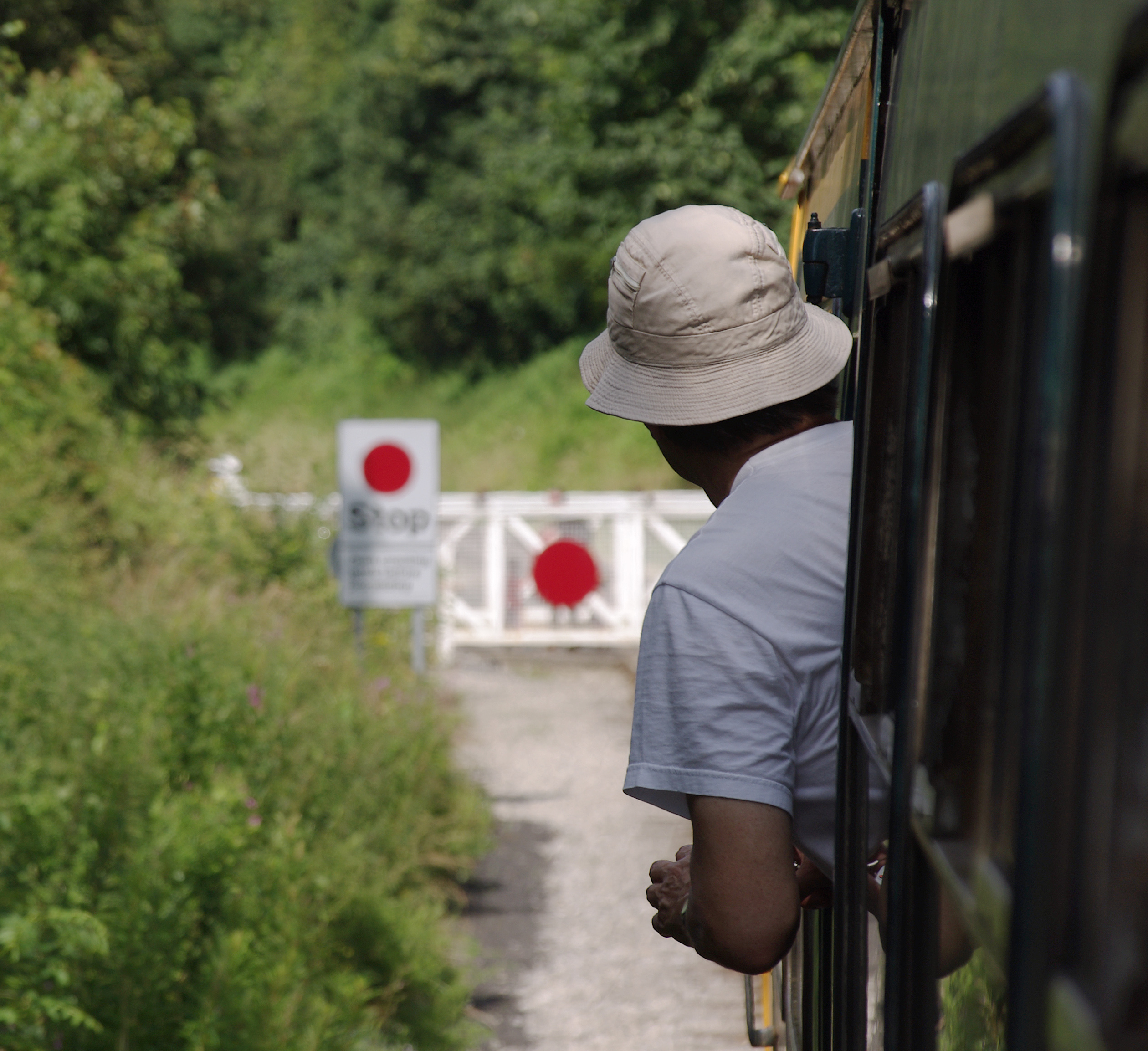
A man wearing a bucket hat

A bucket hat (variations of which include the fisherman's hat, Irish country hat and session hat) is a hat with a narrow, downward-sloping brim. Typically, the hat is made from heavy-duty cotton fabric such as denim or canvas, or heavy wool such as tweed, sometimes with metal eyelets placed on the crown of the hat for ventilation.

It was first adopted as a high fashion item in the 1960s, and with subsequent revivals in both street fashion and on the catwalk. It is popular festival gear in the present day, also known as a "session hat".

== Origins ==
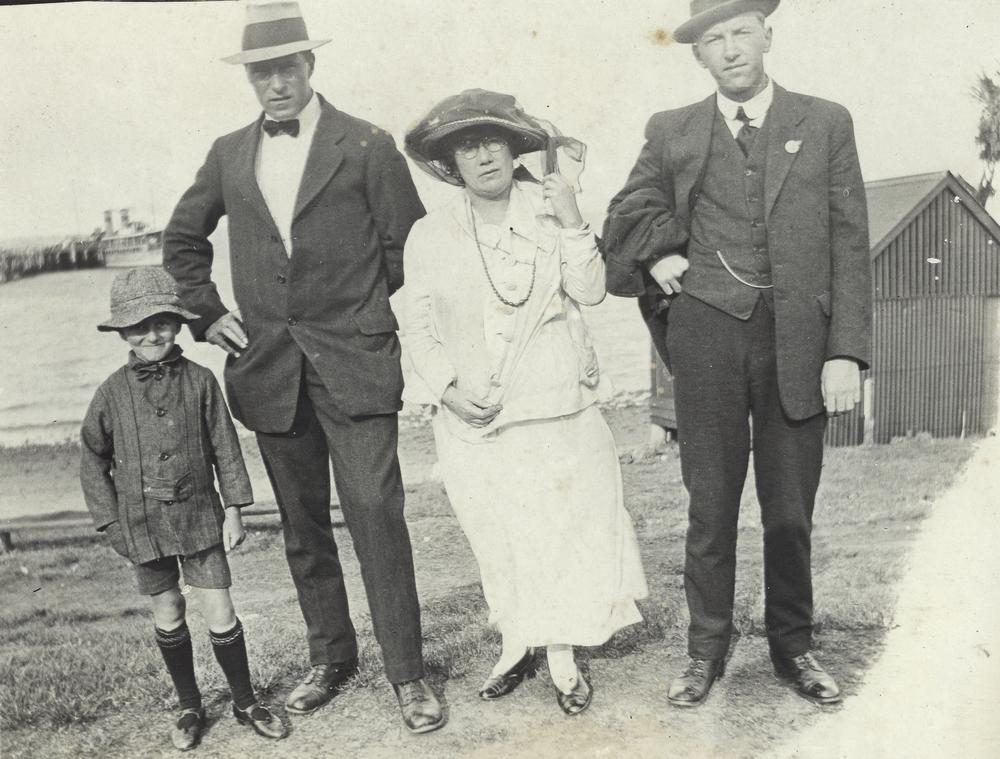
Australian boy wearing tweed bucket hat, 1917

The bucket hat is said to have been introduced around 1900. Originally made from wool felt or tweed cloth, these hats were traditionally worn by Irish farmers and fishermen as protection from the rain, because the lanolin from the unwashed (raw) wool made these hats naturally waterproof. From the interwar years onwards, these "Irish walking hats" were quickly adopted internationally for country pursuits because, when folded, they could fit inside a coat pocket. If the hat fell in the mud, it could be easily cleaned with a damp sponge, and it could be reshaped using steam from a kettle. In the 1960s, it was often worn by members of the Mod subculture.

The modern bucket hat is derived from a tropical hat made from olive drab cotton that was issued to the US Army during the Vietnam War. These lightweight hats became popular among civilians for use in sports such as fishing, and as sun protection.

=== Fashion accessory ===
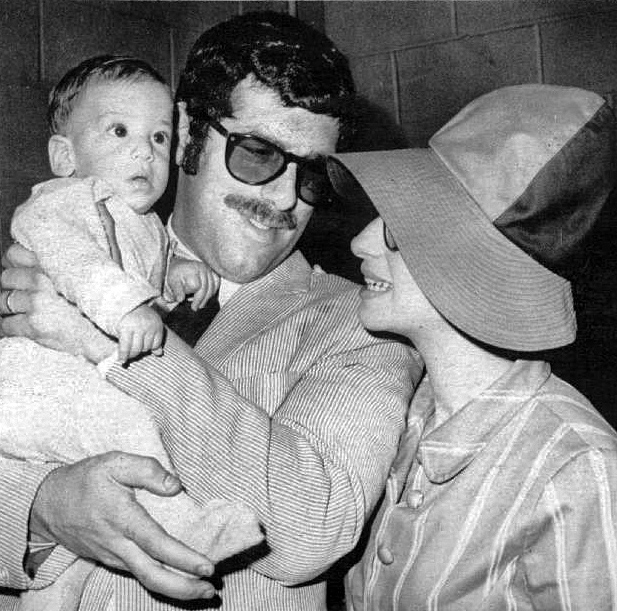
Barbra Streisand – with Elliott Gould and son Jason Gould – wearing a fashionable oversized bucket hat in 1967

Boca Juniors football supporter wearing a piluso bucket hat in 2012

In the 1960s, the bucket hat was adapted as a ladies' fashion item, in common with the pillbox, bakerboy, and cloche styles, suiting the fashion for more bouffant hair. Milliners such as Lilly Daché created designs in felt or other stiffer fabrics to capture the "mod" look. The older tweed Irish walking hat remained popular among professional men until the 1970s, and was notably worn by Sean Connery's character in Indiana Jones and the Last Crusade.

The hat became popular with rappers in the 1980s and remained part of street fashion into the 1990s. In the 2010s, it has re-emerged as a fashion catwalk item after being sported by celebrities such as Rihanna. Since then, luxury bucket hats have been produced by brands such as Gucci, Loewe, and Prada. The bucket-hat has also been associated with the hip-hop scene. The trend was set-off by LL Cool J and Run-DMC, and since then many musical sensations have used it.

The bucket hat, known as the piluso in Argentina, has become associated with South American association football supporter culture, particularly in Argentina and Uruguay, where it is worn in stadium terraces and around matchdays.

== Regional names and variations ==
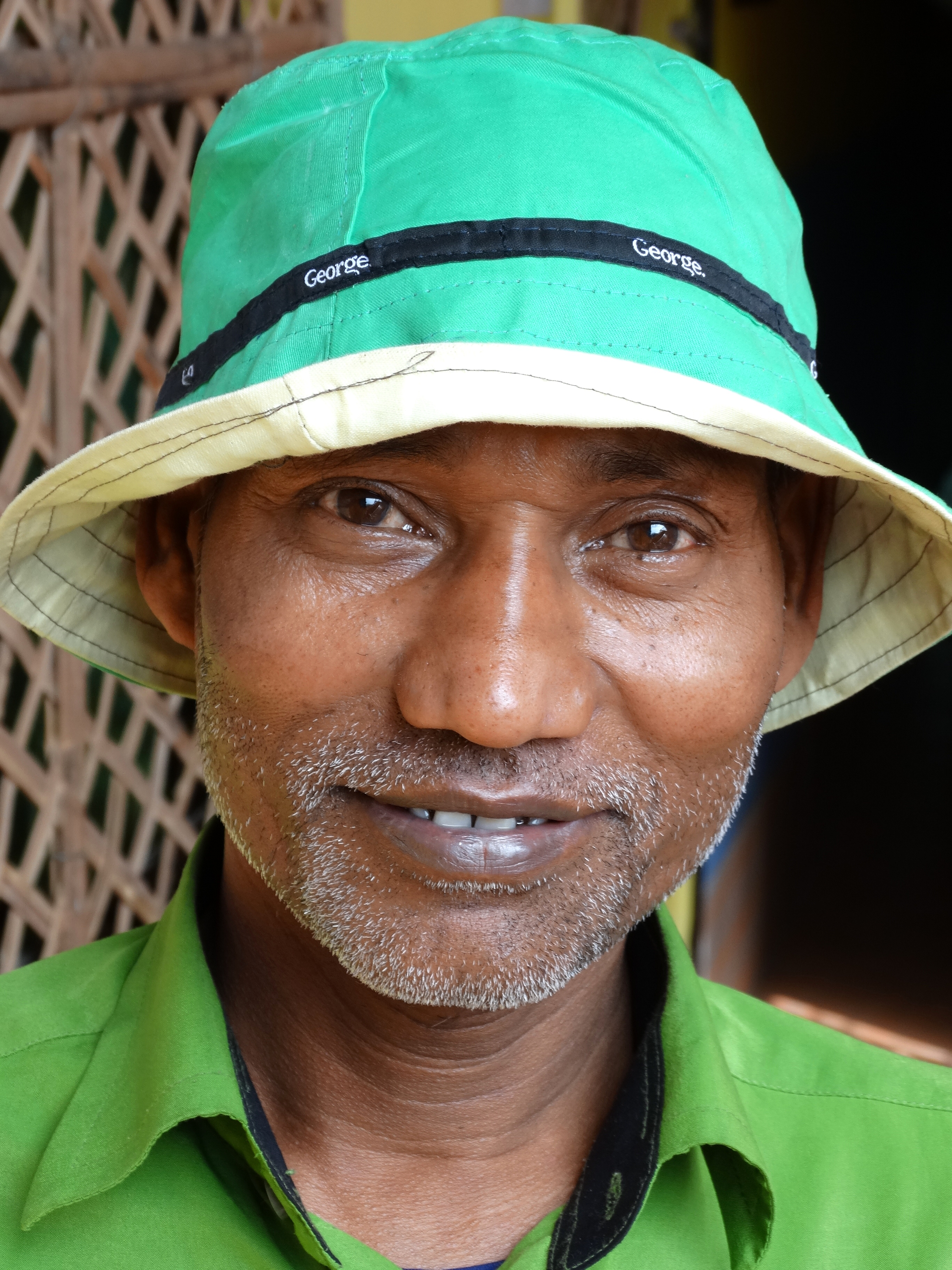
A Bengali man wearing a bucket hat

- In Bulgaria it is popular as "idiotka" (Bulgarian: идиотка), which means "idiot hat".
- In Australia the version worn by the Australian Defence Force is referred as a "Giggle Hat".
- In Israel, it is known as a tembel hat or "Rafael hat", after Rafael Eitan, an Israeli general, politician, and former Chief of Staff of the Israel Defense Forces, who used to wear one. A similar type of hat called a tembel hat is dubbed the national hat of Israel as it was worn by Israeli Halutzim to protect from sunburn.
- In Sweden, it is known as a "Beppehatt" or "Beppemössa", since Beppe Wolgers, a Swedish author and artist, used to wear it and made it popular in the 1970s.
- In Denmark, it is known as "bøllehat" (troublemaker hat) since the 1880s, when a group of young delinquents would gather every Sunday in Bøllemosen in Jægersborg Dyrehave, from where they made trips to a popular dance restaurant in Charlottenlund to steal the ladies' hats.
- In Argentina, it is known as "sombrero Piluso" (Piluso hat), after Alberto Olmedo's character, where its popularity rose after the 2022 FIFA World Cup.
- In Russia, it is called Panamka(Russian: панама). The name came from misconception of panama hat, known as hat of Ecuadorian workers in Panama.
- In South Africa, it is known as an "ispoti" and is very popular with urban black youth, representing being streetwise without copying foreign hip-hop trends.
- In Tanzania, it is very popular among elders, especially among the Iraqw people.
- In the United States, a similar hat is used officially by the US Navy for enlisted service dress uniforms, commonly referred to as a Dixie Cup hat, as in the manufacturer brand of paper cups.
- In France, it is called a "Bob".
- In Germany, it is called "Anglerhut" (fisher's hat). It is popular as an accessory in German hip hop.
- In the United Kingdom, it is sometimes called "Reni hat", after Stone Roses drummer Reni who frequently wore the hat. There is also a version known as the Welsh bucket hat, which is yellow, red and green and worn to show support for the Wales national football team.
- In Italy, it's called a "fisherman's hat" (cappello da pescatore).
- In Brazil and Mexico, it's widely known as "chapéu do Seu Madruga" (Don Ramón's hat) and respected due to being worn by the character. Cosplayers may be casually seen in some cities wearing the iconic hat.
- In the Netherlands, it's referred to as a vissershoed.
- In Turkey it is known as "balıkçı şapkası" (fisherman's hat) and "kova şapka" (bucket hat).

=== In popular culture ===
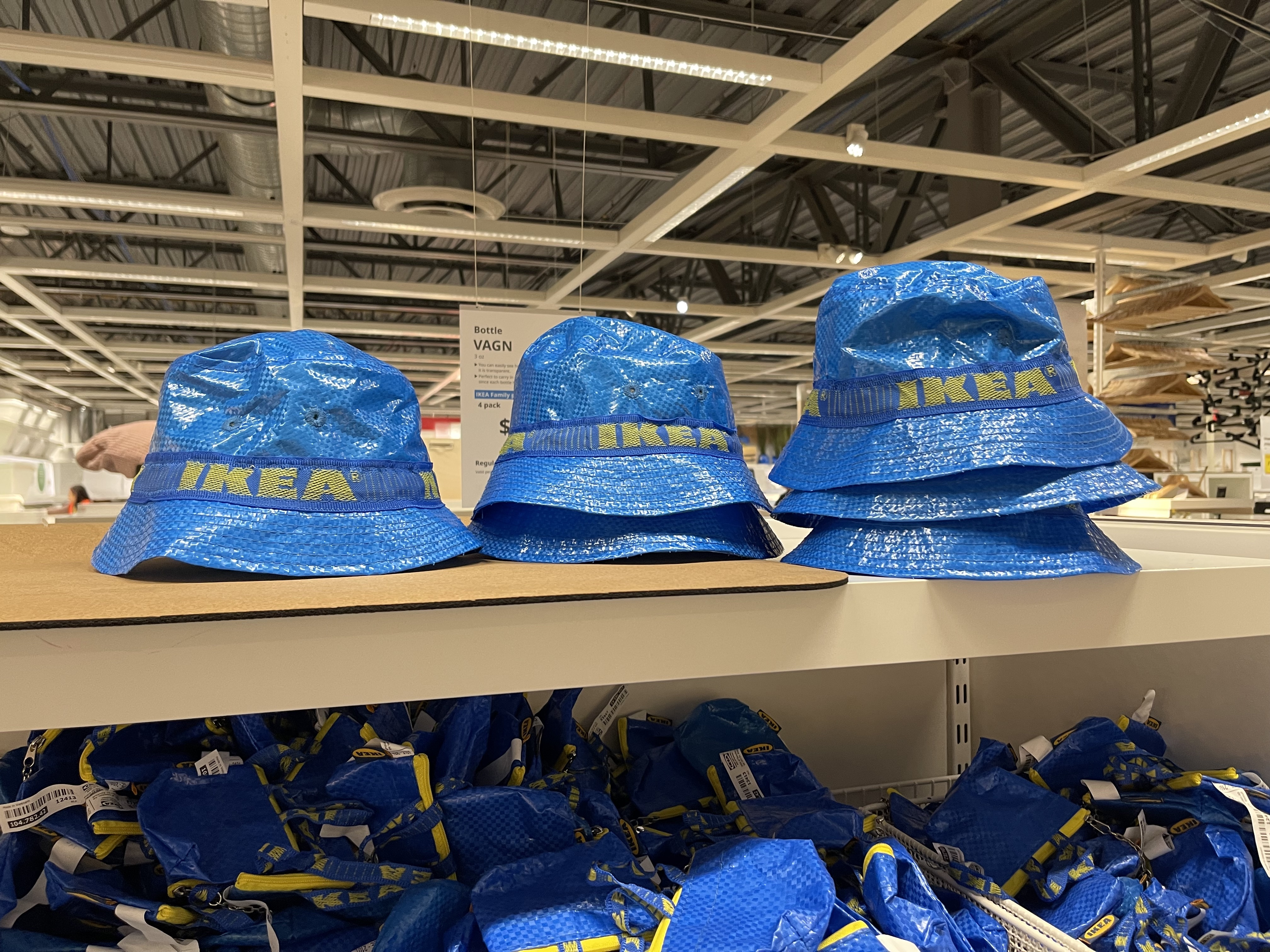
IKEA branded bucket hats at an IKEA store in Emeryville, California in 2022.

- Both fictional characters Inspector Clouseau from The Pink Panther film series and Detective Lieutenant Louie Provenza of the television series The Closer and Major Crimes frequently wear bucket hats: for Peter Sellers' portrayal of Clouseau, a grayish-shade Irish tweed fabric variety, with Provenza wearing a white bucket hat while at crime scenes.
- Female sleuths wear them too. Dame Margaret Rutherford wore bucket hats from her own wardrobe when she starred as Miss Jane Marple in four films, beginning with Murder She Said in 1961. Brenda Blethyn also wears bucket hats in her role as Detective Chief Inspector Vera Stanhope in ITV crime drama Vera (TV series) from 2011 to 2025.
- Don Ramón (played by Ramón Valdés) always don his signature blue bucket hat in Mexican sitcom El Chavo del Ocho.
- The character Gilligan in the TV series Gilligan's Island ubiquitously wears a cream-colored bucket hat throughout its episodes.
- During the 1990s Liam Gallagher, lead vocalist of the rock band Oasis, was photographed multiple times wearing a bucket hat.

== See also ==
- List of hat styles
  - Boonie hat
  - Wales bucket hat
  - Sun hat
  - Tembel hat
  - Legionnaire hat
