= Boonie hat =

Wide-brim hat commonly used by military forces in hot tropical climates

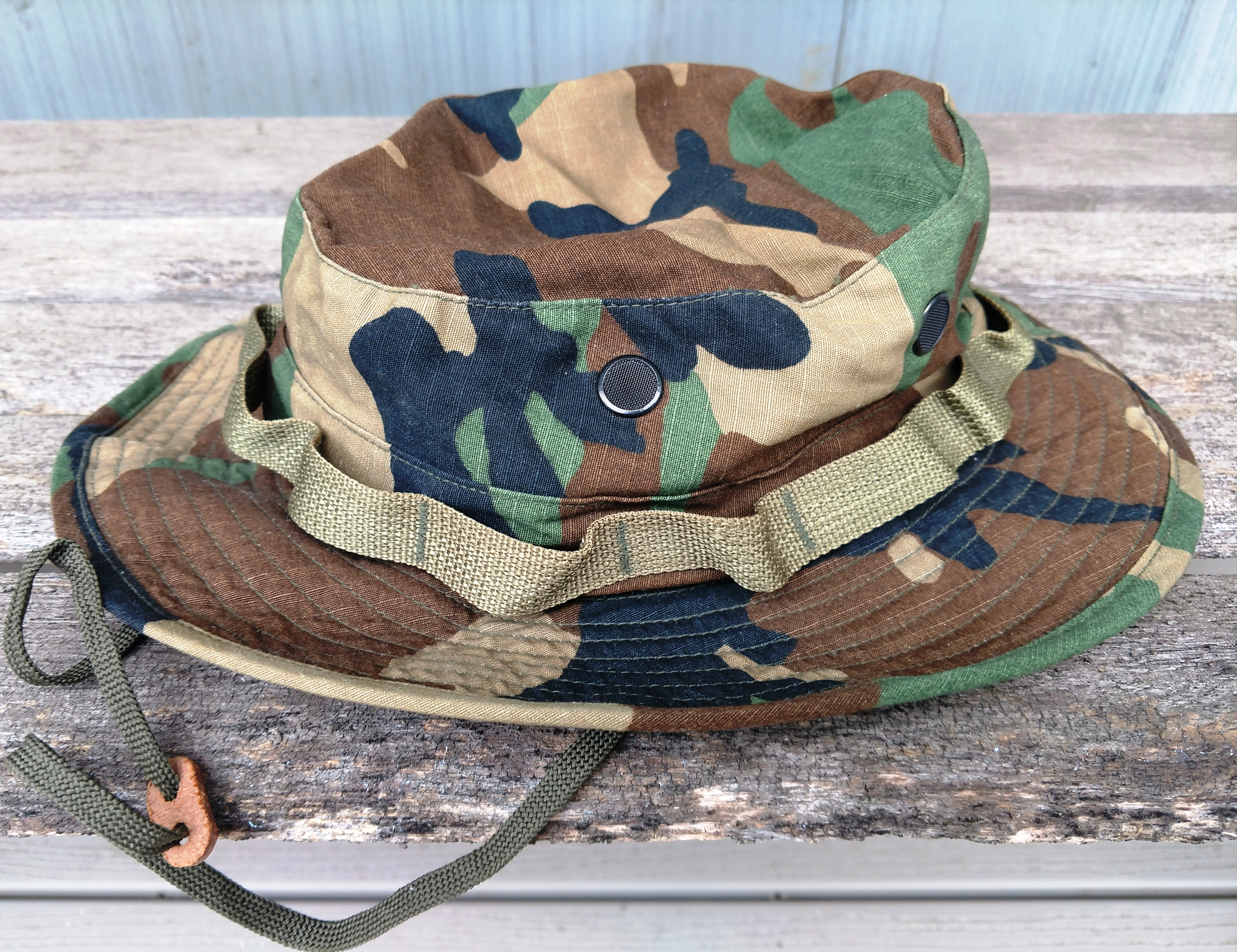
U.S. Army issue boonie hat in the BDU camouflage pattern, circa 1994

A boonie hat or booney hat is a type of wide-brim sun hat commonly used by military forces in hot tropical climates. Its design is similar to a bucket hat but with a stiffer brim.

The Australian giggle hat has a thinner brim. Often a fabric tape band of "branch loops" is sewn around the crown of the hat. This "foliage ring" is meant to hold additional vegetation as camouflage. A strap provides stability. The crown may be vented with eyelets or small mesh panels. Snaps may also be provided with which to fix the brim in the style of an Australian bush hat.

== U.S. military boonie hat ==
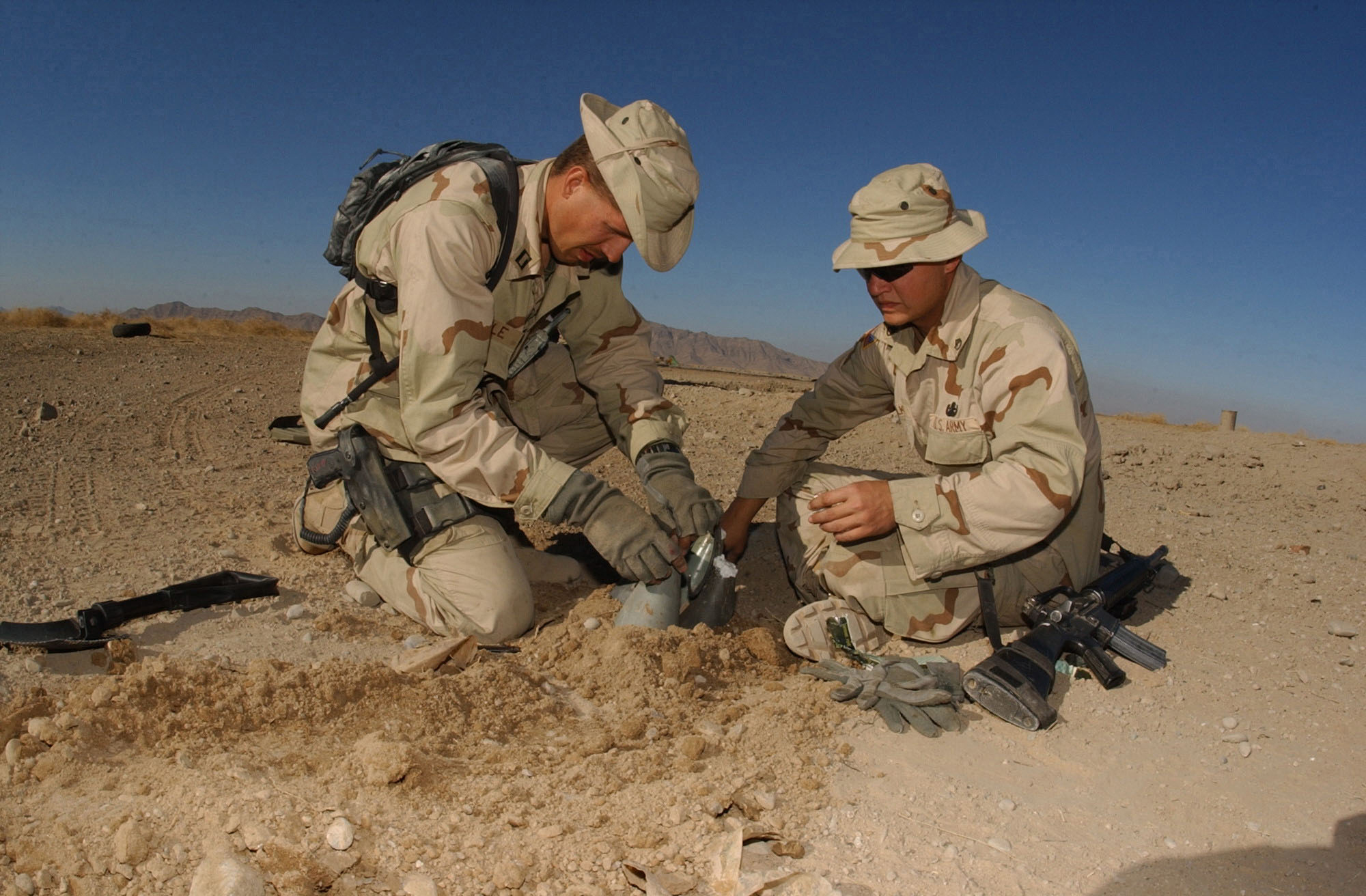
Two U.S. military servicemen wearing boonie hats in 2001

A blue cap with an all-around brim was issued as part of the 1937 blue denim fatigue uniform that was nicknamed the "Daisy Mae hat". The M1941 green herringbone twill cloth fatigue uniform featured the same hat. The military caps inspired "Johnny Jeep" hats (or "Johnny Jeepers") which were featured on the cover of the August 24, 1942 issue of LIFE magazine and mocked in the accompanying article. The cover features two female models wearing the hats in style, while the article notes that the fashion accessory costs $25 at John-Frederic's (from a famous milliner known as Mr. John) and the "Army hat" costs 45¢. Photos of GIs demonstrating various ways to wear the hat are included in the tongue-in-cheek article. Lord & Taylor produced licensed copies for a reduced price; cheap knockoffs ("bootleg imitations") soon followed.

The boonie hat was introduced to the United States Armed Forces during the Vietnam War, when U.S. Army Green Berets of the 5th Special Forces Group began wearing them in the field, along with Australian and Army of the Republic of Vietnam units. These leopard spots or tigerstripe boonie hats were locally procured, and the camouflage cloth was usually salvaged from other uniform items or parachutes, and were fabricated by a tailor in the style of the French chapeau de brousse Mle 1949. The name is derived from "boonie", the abbreviated form of boondocks (originally American military slang derived from Tagalog bundok, "mountain", during the Philippine–American War). The hat was similar to the hat worn with the pattern 1941 HBT fatigue uniform.

In 1967, the U.S. Army began issuing boonie hats, such as the "Hat, Jungle, with Insect Net", made of cotton and wind-resistant poplin, in olive drab, tigerstripe, and ERDL pattern. It was meant to supplement and replace the patrol and baseball caps that had been in service since World War II. As the U.S. military evolved away from a garrison mentality, the boonie hat found a permanent place as part of the uniform of all services. The boonie hat has changed little through the decades since the Vietnam War and was used in both the Iraq War and the War in Afghanistan as an alternative to the patrol cap. The U.S. military boonie hat has come in a variety of camouflage patterns; the current assortment includes Woodland, three-color desert, UCP, MultiCam, and both desert and woodland versions of MARPAT, as well as the Air Force ABU pattern. The boonie hat is often worn with the wearer's rank insignia pinned or sewn to the front, above the branch loops.

=== Hat, Camouflage (Tropical Combat) Type II ===
In 1968 the U.S. Army authorized the use of the woodland ERDL pattern (Engineer Research & Development Laboratory) material, used in 1969 and later production of hats in cotton ripstop material. These were labeled, "Hat, Camouflage (Tropical Combat) Type II" with contract dates starting in 1968. They were in use from 1968 for both the Army and Air Force, and from 1969 to 1970 for the Marine Corps and Navy.

=== Hat, Sun, Hot Weather ===
Later boonies are called "Hat, Sun" or "Hat, Sun, Hot Weather", which is still the designation for this type of cover. They are made in various patterns, in cotton ripstop or nylon blend cloth.

== Australian Army giggle hat ==
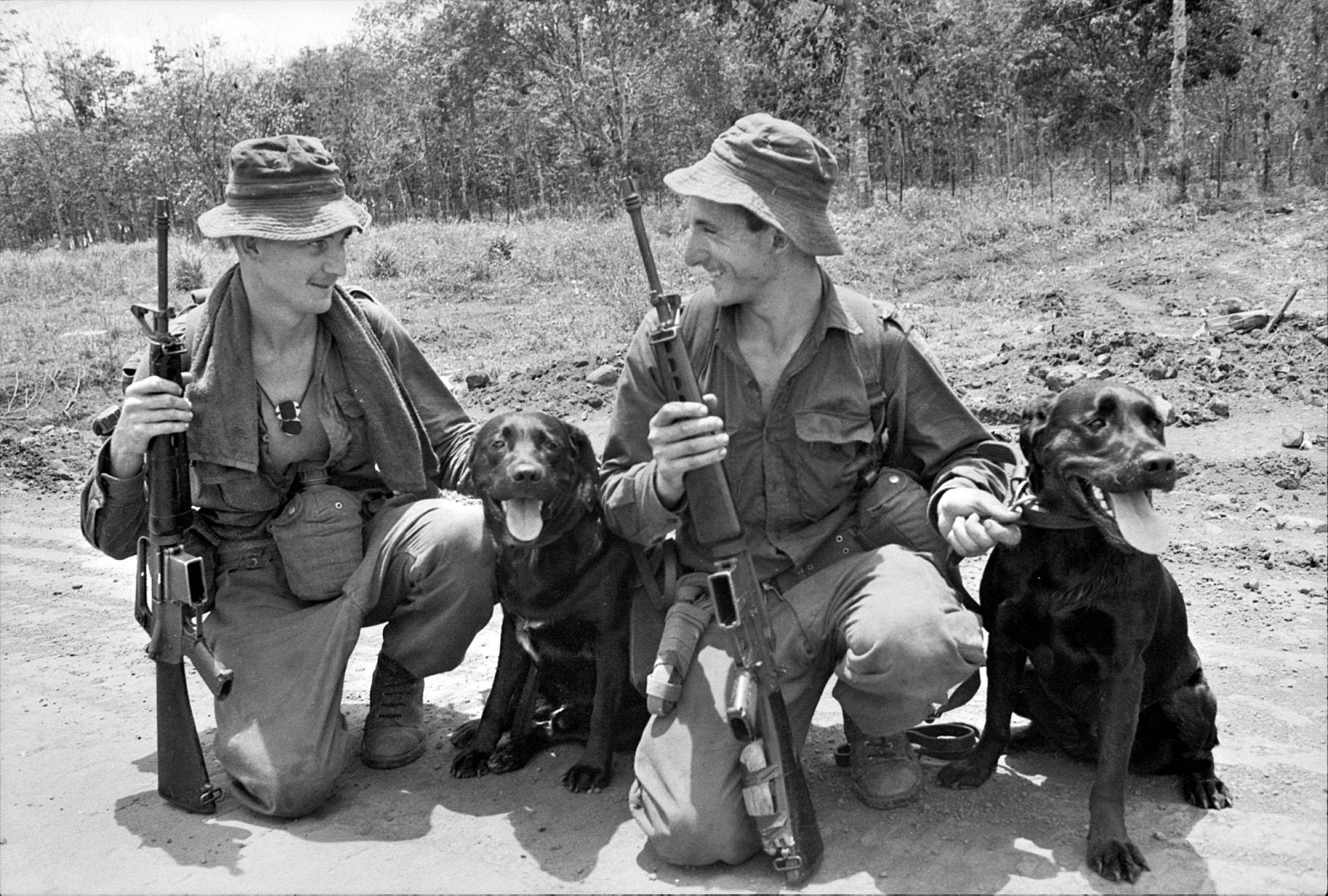
Two Australian soldiers wearing "giggle hats" in South Vietnam

Similar wide-brimmed hats in the Australian Army are known as giggle hats although today most Australian soldiers refer to them as bush hats, unlike in the past where a slouch hat with the brim down was referred to as a bush hat. Along with slouch hats, giggle hats were issued as the standard uniform of Australian troops fighting in the South West Pacific theatre, during the Second World War. The design apparently originated from an earlier British uniform intended for fighting in hot and humid conditions. They were nicknamed "giggle hats" (as well as "hat ridiculous-for-the-use-of") by the Australian troops due to their appearance.

The giggle hat gained popularity during the Malayan Emergency. Protection from the searing heat of Malayan conditions and heavy rain proved to be necessary. Alongside the British, the Australian Army started issuing this type of hat, which had a steeper and shorter brim than its earlier counterparts. It was made with the same materials as the hot weather combat uniforms, unlike the slouch hat, which was beginning to take on a more ceremonial role rather than being field gear.

These hats gained popularity during the Vietnam War, where they were called 'hats utility, jungle green', although they were colloquially known by Australians as giggle hats. Their New Zealand counterparts referred to them as "J hats." During this conflict, most Australian soldiers were issued the hat. The army created several regulations: the hat was not allowed to be modified or cut whatsoever, and it had to be worn when outdoors at all times. The hat had also served to break up the recognizable outline of the soldier's head. It was made with cotton twill and was issued in olive drab, the standard colour of Australian combat uniforms at the time.

Australian soldier wearing a giggle hat, Afghanistan, 2013

Current giggle hats are issued in Multicam Pattern. They continue to be heavily used by the Australian Defence Force, and are issued to every person serving in the Australian Army and Royal Australian Air Force (RAAF).

== See also ==
- List of hat styles
- Bucket hat
- Legionnaire hat
- Panamka
- Patrol cap
- Peaked cap
- Pith helmet
- Side cap
- Slouch hat
- Headgear of the United States Army
