= Neighborhoods of Tel Aviv =

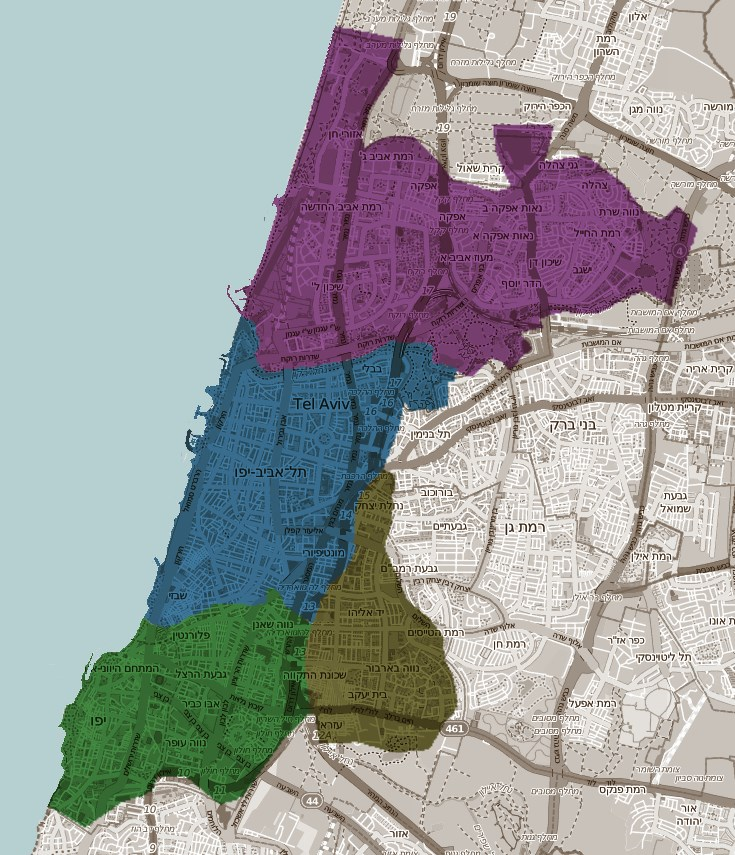
Map of Tel Aviv with the four quarters.

The city of Tel Aviv-Yafo is subdivided into four quarters, which are further divided into neighborhoods.

== Quarters ==
The quarters of Tel Aviv are as follows.

Name	In Hebrew	Area	Population (estimated, ca. 2021)	Density per sq. km
North / Trans-Yarkon	צפון / עבר הירקון	22 km^{2} (8.5 mi^{2})	123,000	5,591
Center	מרכז	13 km^{2} (5.0 mi^{2})	170,000	13,077
Jaffa and South	יפו ודרום	10 km^{2} (3.9 mi^{2})	85,000	8,500
East	מזרח	8.5 km^{2} (3.3 mi^{2})	82,000	9,647

== Neighborhoods ==

Below is the list of neighborhoods, arranged geographically from north to south, then from west to east.

=== Northwest ===
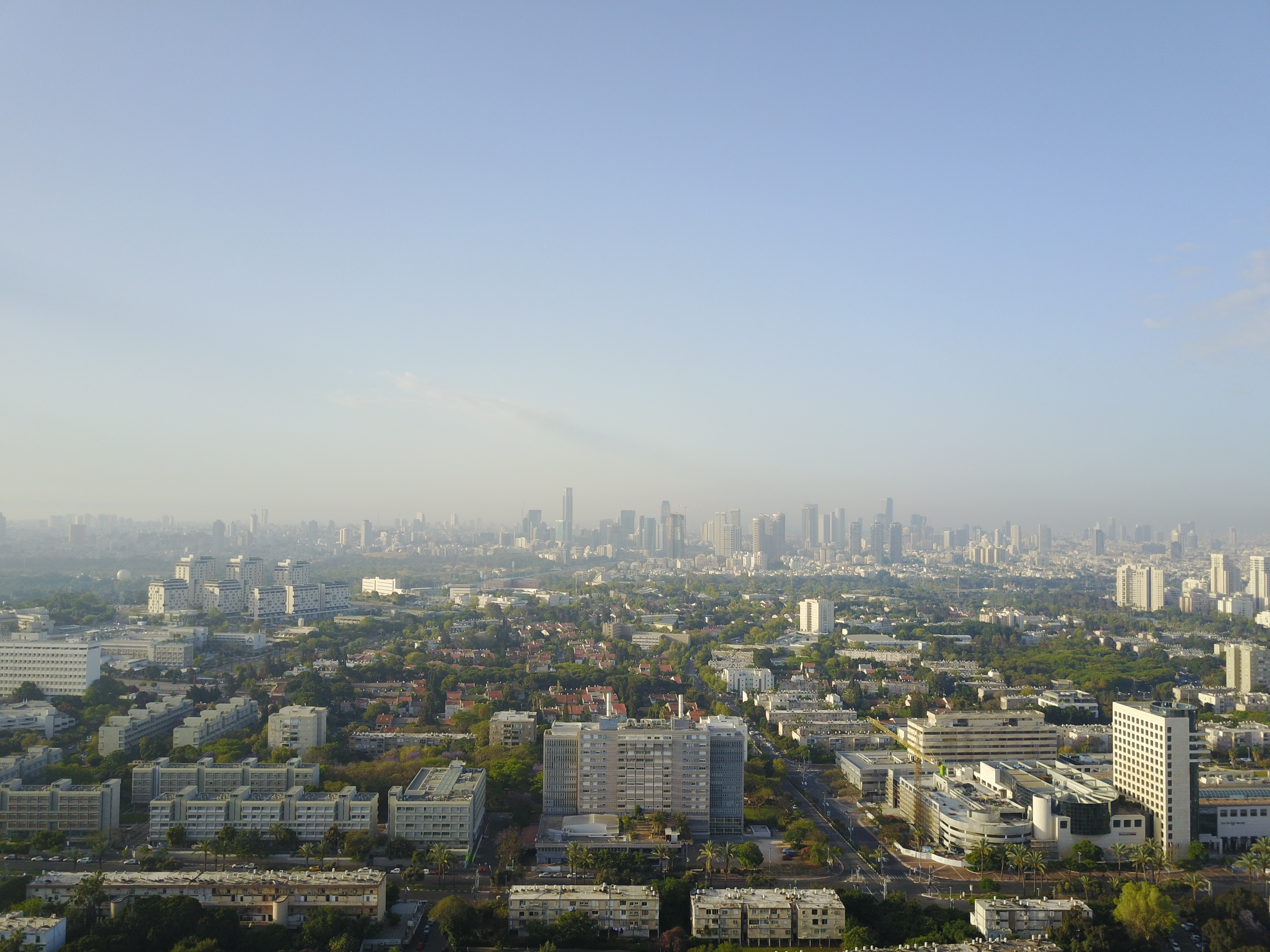
Ramat Aviv

Residential

- Azorei Hen (אזורי חן), Areas of Grace
- Kokhav HaTzafon (כוכב הצפון), Northern Star
- Tokhnit Lamed (תָּכְנִית לָמֶד), Plan 30
- Migdalei Ne'eman (מגדלי נאמן) Faithful Towers
- Neve Avivim (נווה אביבים), Springs Oasis (also known as Ramat Aviv Bet/ 2)
- Nofei Yam (נופי ים) Sea view
- Ramat Aviv (רמת אביב), Spring Height
- Ramat Aviv Gimmel (רמת אביב ג), Spring Height 3
- Ramat Aviv HaHadasha (רמת אביב החדשה), New Spring Height

Non-residential regions

- Museum campus
- Tel Aviv University Campus
- Yarkon Park (Park Ha-Yarkon officially Ganei Yehoshua/ Joshua Gardens)

=== Northeast ===
Residential

- Ganei Tzahala (גני צהלה), Gardens of Joy
- HaMishtalah (המשתלה), The [Plant] Nursery
- Hadar Yosef (הדר יוסף), Glory of Joseph (Elishar)
- Ma'oz Aviv (מעוז אביב), Spring Fortress
- Ne'ot Afeka (נאות אפקה), Beautiful Pastures
- Neve Sharret (נוה שרת), (Moshe) Sharett Oasis
- Ramat HaHayal (רמת החייל), Soldier's Hill (also known as (רמת החי"ל), HIL (acronym for the Jewish Brigade) Height)
- Ramot Tzahala (רמות צהלה), Heights of IDF-Joy (Portmanteau from IDF and Joy)
- Revivim (רביבים),Mild rainstorms
- Shikun Dan (שיכון דן), Dan Neighborhood
- Tel Baruch (תל ברוך), (Mordechai Joseph) Baruch Hill
- Tzahala (צהלה), Portmanteau from IDF and Joy
- Yisgav (ישגב), He will be Great

Non-residential regions

- Kiryat Atidim (קריית עתידים), Campus of the Future

=== Central ===
Residential

- Old North (הצפון הישן)
- Yehuda HaMaccabi (יהודה המכבי) Judah the Maccabi
- Montefiore (מונטיפיורי), (Moses) Montefiore
- Lev HaIr (לב העיר), The City Center/Core, lit. Heart of the City
- Kerem Hatemanim (כרם התימנים), Yemenites Vineyard
- Bavli, (בבלי) Babylonian (Talmud)
- Tzamarot Ayalon (צמרות איילון), Ayalon Treetops
- Giv'at Amal Bet (גבעת עמל ב'), Workers Hill B
- Neve Tzedek (נווה צדק), Oasis of Justice
- Shabazi (שבזי), (Shalom) Shabazi
- Ohel Moshe (אהל משה), Moshe Tent (merged with Neve Tzedek)

Non-residential regions

- HaRakevet (הרכבת), The Train
- HaKirya (הקרייה), The (Government) Campus
- Menashiya (מנשייה)

=== Southwest ===
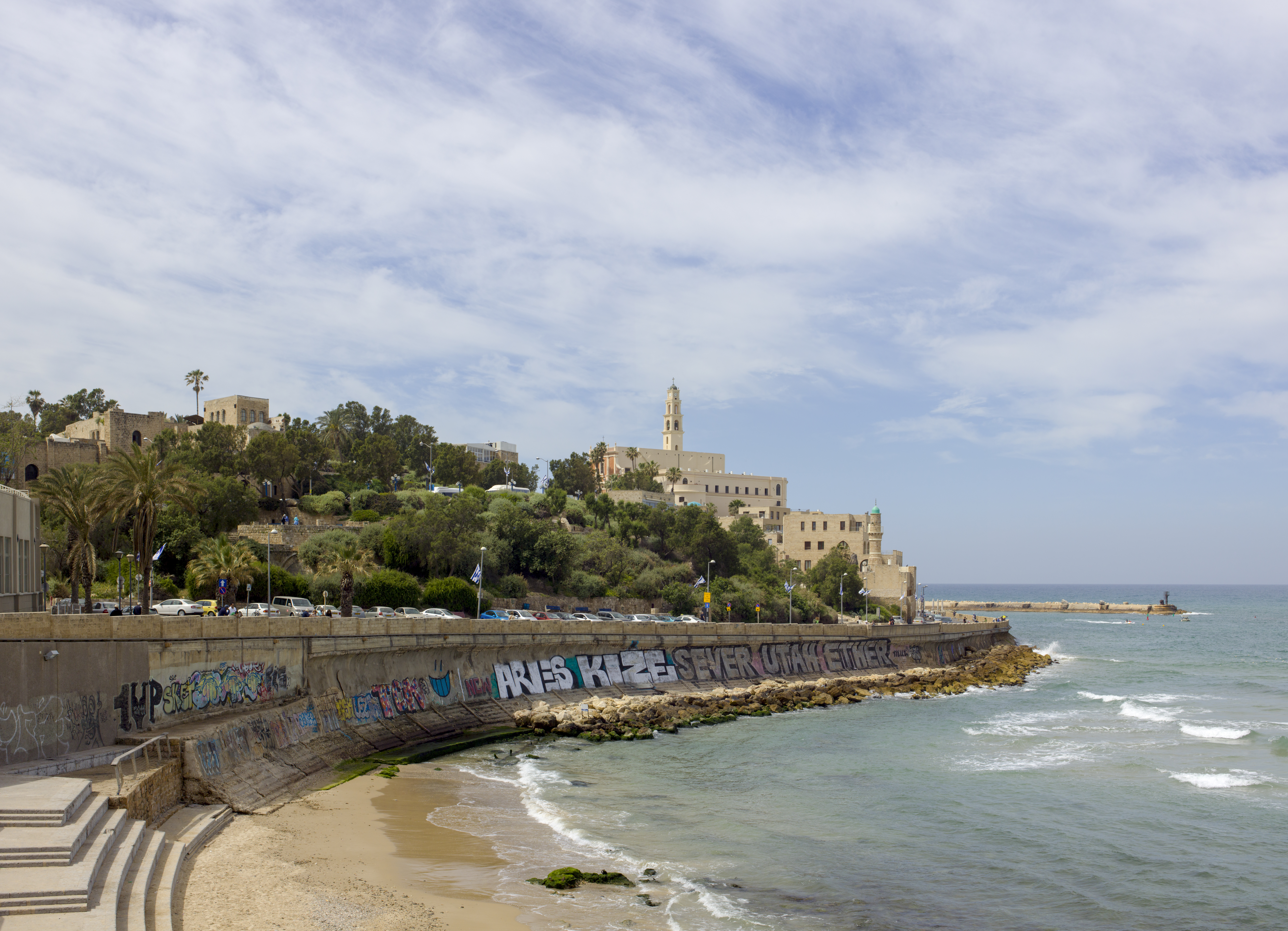
Old Jaffa

- Old Jaffa (יפו העתיקה), Old Jaffa
- Yafo C (יפו דרום), Jaffa South
- Giv'at HaTmarim (גבעת התמרים), Dates Hill
- Ajami (עג'מי), (Ibrahim) al-Ajami
- Tzahalon (צהלון), Rejoice
- Givat Aliyah (גבעת עלייה), Aliyah Hill = Elevation's Hill

=== South ===
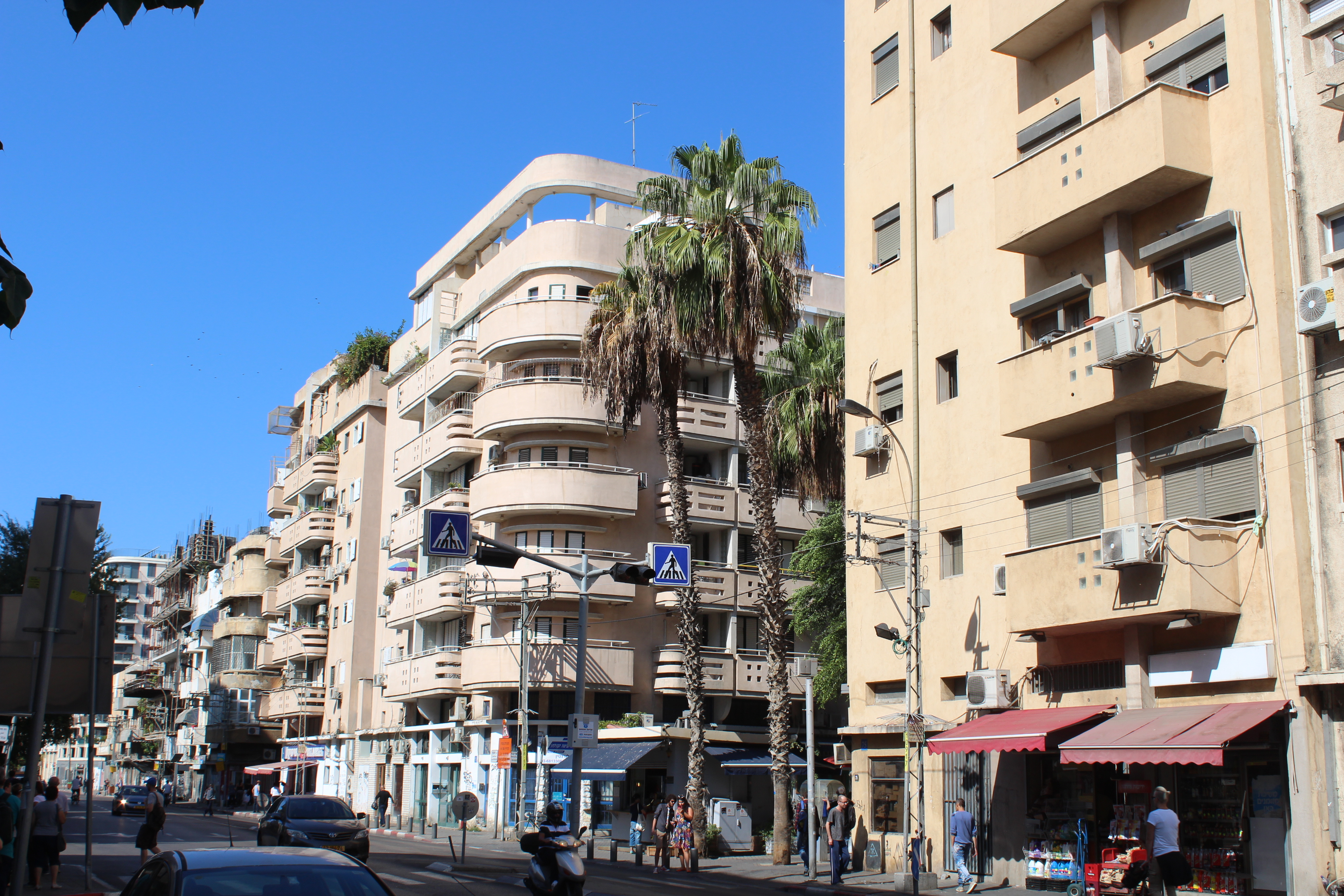
Florentin, Tel Aviv

- Florentin (פלורנטין)
- Neve Sha'anan (נווה שאנן), Serenity's Oasis / Peaceful Abode
- Neve Ofer (נווה עופר), (Avraham) Ofer Oasis, also Tel Kabir
- Kiryat Shalom (קריית שלום), City of Peace
- Shapira (שפירא), (Meir Gezl) Shapira
- Giv'at Herzl (גבעת הרצל), Herzl Hill
- Abu Kabir (אבו כביר), named after Tall al Kabir, Egypt
- American–German Colony (המושבה האמריקאית-גרמנית)

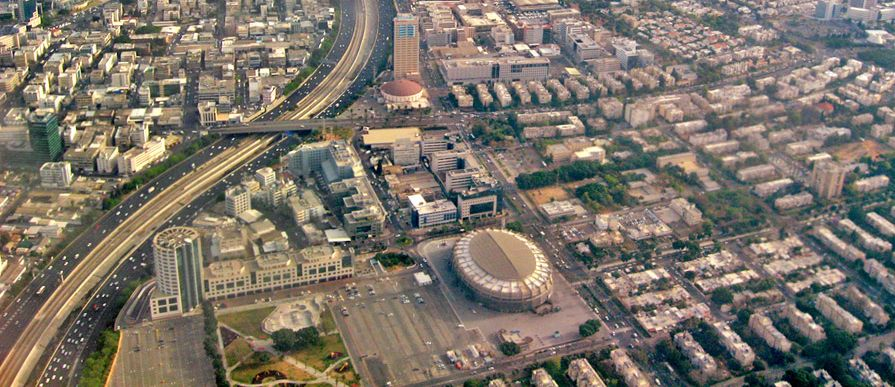
Aerial view of Yad Eliyahu

=== Southeast ===
- Nahalat Yitzhak (נחלת יצחק), Yitzchak's (Spektor) Estate
- Bitzaron (ביצרון), Little Fortress
- Ramat Yisrael (רמת ישראל), Israel (Rokach) Heights
- Tel Haim (תל חיים), Haim (Chisin) Hill
- Yad Eliyahu (יד אליהו), Eliyahu (Golomb) Memorial
- Ramat HaTayasim (רמת הטייסים), Pilots' Height
- Neve Tzahal (נוה צה"ל), Oasis of the IDF
- Kfar Shalem (כפר שלם), Peaceful Village
- HaArgazim (הארגזים), The Crates
- Shkhunat HaTikva (שכונת התקווה), The Hope Quarter
- Neve Barbur (נווה בארבור), Swan Oasis / Swan's Abode
- Ezra (עזרא), named after biblical Ezra, the scribe
