= Afeka =

Neighborhood in Tel Aviv, Israel

- Neighborhood of Tel Aviv
- Interactive map of Afeka
- Coordinates: 32.114167°N 34.796944°E
- Country: Israel
- City: Tel Aviv
- Quarter: 1st Quarter of Tel Aviv

Area
  - Total: 2.321 km^{2} (0.896 sq mi)

Median Age

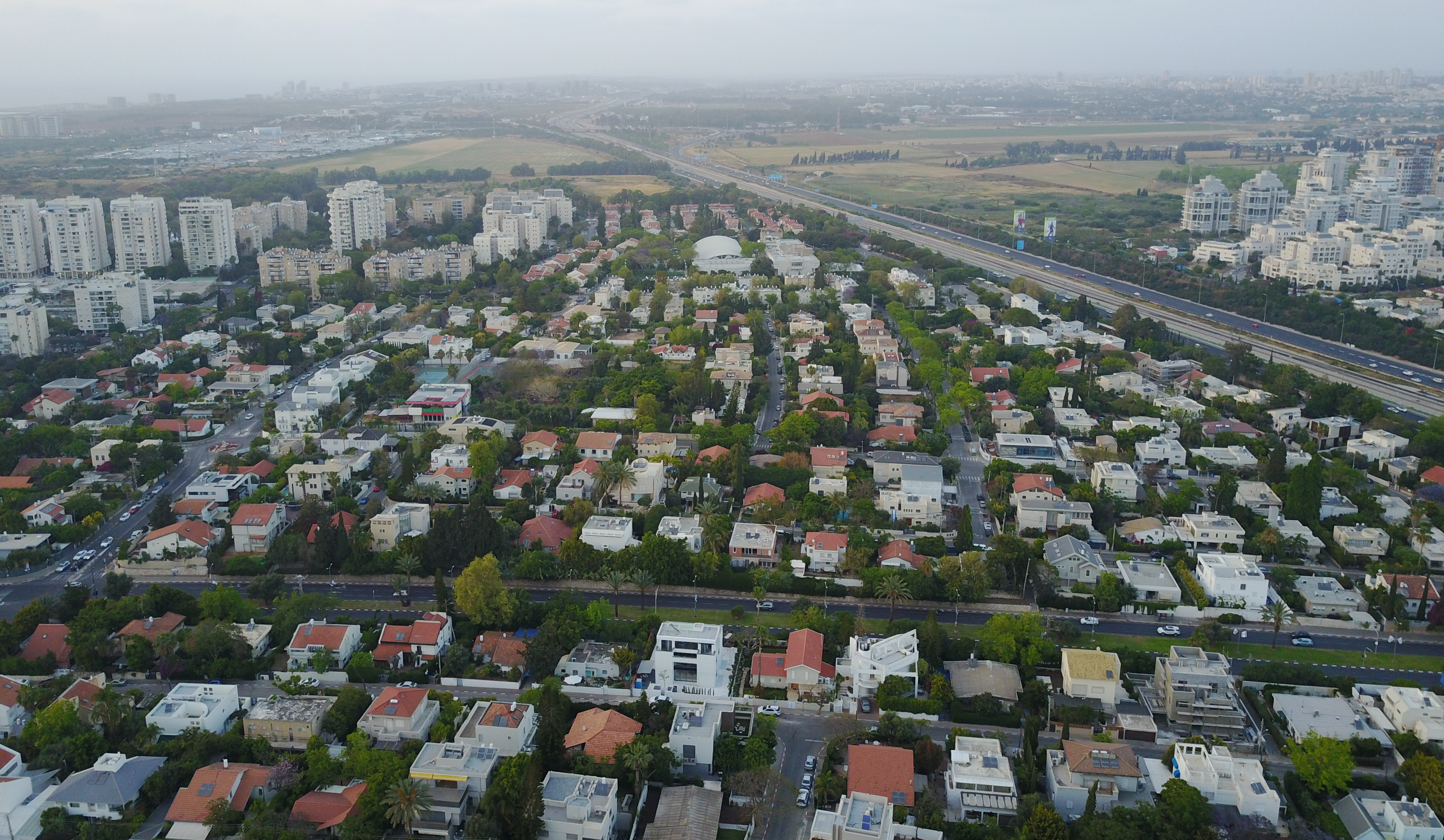
Aerial photo of Afeka

Afeka is a neighborhood in the north of the city of Tel Aviv, located north of the Yarkon River, which was established by the commanders of the Haganah for their families.

The neighborhood is bordered in the east by the Tel Baruch neighborhood, in the south by the Tel Aviv University, in the west by the Neve Avivim neighborhood and in the northwest by the Ramat Aviv Gimel neighborhood.

== Name origin ==
During the planning stages of the neighborhood, a proposal was received from KKL to replace the neighborhood's land and place the Hagana Commanders neighborhood in Tel Afek. Following the proposal that was later rejected, the name of the Hagana Commanders' Association that established the neighborhood was changed to "Afeka Hagana Commanders' Housing, Cooperative Association". The name "Afeka" means "to Tel Afek" (in Hebrew, the addition of the letter "a" at the end of a location means "to" that location).

== History ==
Afeka was built in 1954–1955 north of the Yarkon river and north of the core of the village Sheikh Munis. It began with a cooperative association that purchased land back in the days of the British Mandate of Palestine. The first settler nucleus was organized in the summer of 1943 at a course for the Haganah commanders in the Tel Aviv area. The Haganah in those days was an illegal military organization, so the organization for the construction of the housing project was done separately from the Haganah. The association was headed by Dr. Zvi "Charlie" Levin, head of the Haganah's communication force. The cooperative association had 140 members. Most of them were commanders in the Haganah.

To save costs, the association decided that the first 107 houses would be built centrally. Residents were given the option to choose from several models of houses. The first houses were inhabited in 1955 and in October 1955 it was published in the Davar newspaper that "120 of the 250 houses of the Afeka neighborhood (the neighborhood of the Haganah commanders) have already been built. In April, names were determined for 15 streets in the new neighborhood. Most of the names are related to the operations of the Haganah.

== Demographics ==
The neighborhood is considered one of the most expensive and richest in Israel and its ranking in the socio-economic index is 10 out of 10.

Afeka was marked as a neighborhood of high socio-economic status from its first days. The communist newspaper Kol Ha'am noted in its issue of 3 September 1958 that the highest revenue per capita in the branches of the Cooperative Consumers Association in Tel Aviv (which operated eighty consumer associations that year) was recorded in the Afeka consumer association (which was located on Chaish St, next to the synagogue) – 304 lira per capita per year. The newspaper also noted that, for comparison, "in the shops in the Hatikva neighborhood and in the shops of the teachers association in King George Street, the average revenue per capita per year did not exceed 43 lira in 1957". Afeka's image as a wealthy neighborhood continued to grow stronger in recent decades, when impressive villas were built there in place of the original houses that were destroyed.

The founding residents of the neighborhood included members of the public, the military, and the Mossad (Zvi Malchin, Mike Harari, Mota Gur, Shlomo Lahat, Rafi Eitan, Smuel Barkai and more) alongside artists and intellectuals (Abraham Dasha (Pashnel), Ephraim Kishon, the duo "Ilka and Aviva", Batya Uziel, and others).

Until the end of the 1990s the philanthropist Bat Sheva de Rothschild, a daughter of the Rothschild family and founder of Batsheva Dance Company, lived in the neighborhood.

== Sports ==
In the garden on the volunteer street there are two tennis courts and a basketball court.

There are public fitness facilities in the Carter Garden on Kommiam Street.

The sports center of Tel Aviv University is located south of the neighborhood.

In the northeast of the neighborhood is the Beit HaLochem, which is a sports-rehabilitation and social activity center for the disabled IDF and their families, operated by the IDF Disabled Organization.

== Public Gardens ==
There are public gardens in the neighborhood, including "Gan Carter" on Kommiam Street, which includes playgrounds and spacious lawns.

An urban grove of trees called Drezner Grove that covers about 1500 dunams is located adjacent to the north of the neighborhood near Afka Caves. The grove is also used for planting trees that have been uprooted from other places in the city of Tel Aviv-Yafo. The trees in the grove are therefore numbered.

== Monuments ==
In Carter Garden, there is a memorial to Rabbi Firefighter Shalom Sharabi, who was killed by falling into a deep well inside an abandoned building that was within the garden, on 5 March 2000.

The "Haganah Square" is a monument commemorating the members of the Haganah and its commanders in Tel Aviv who founded the Afka neighborhood in 1943.

== Education ==
In the neighborhood there are state kindergartens on the volunteer street.

The children of the neighborhood attend schools in the nearby neighborhoods.

"Yad Avner" is the building of the Geography department of Tel Aviv University, named after General Elimlech Avner. The building, designed by the architect Sam Barkai, was originally designed as the community house of the neighborhood, and since 1971 is used by Tel Aviv University.

Tel Aviv University is located south of the neighborhood.

Afeka College is not located in the Afeka neighborhood but in the Naot Afeka neighborhood, several kilometers further east.

== Policing ==
In the Community Policing Center neighborhood, at 10 Zelig Street, the 'Yad Avner' building, where the Geography department of Tel Aviv University is also located.

== Archaeology ==
At the northern border of the neighborhood, an archaeological site was discovered in 1951 with burial caves from the Roman and Byzantine periods attributed to the Samaritan tribe. The site became known as Caves of Afka.

== Religion ==
The Afeka Synagogue was established in the early 1970s. The cornerstone was laid in 1966. The synagogue is still active today.

In the neighborhood there is a Beit Chabad managed by the local Chabad emissary.

== See also ==
- History of Tel Aviv
