= Ramat Aviv =

Ramat Aviv רָמַת אָבִיב
- Neighborhood of Tel Aviv
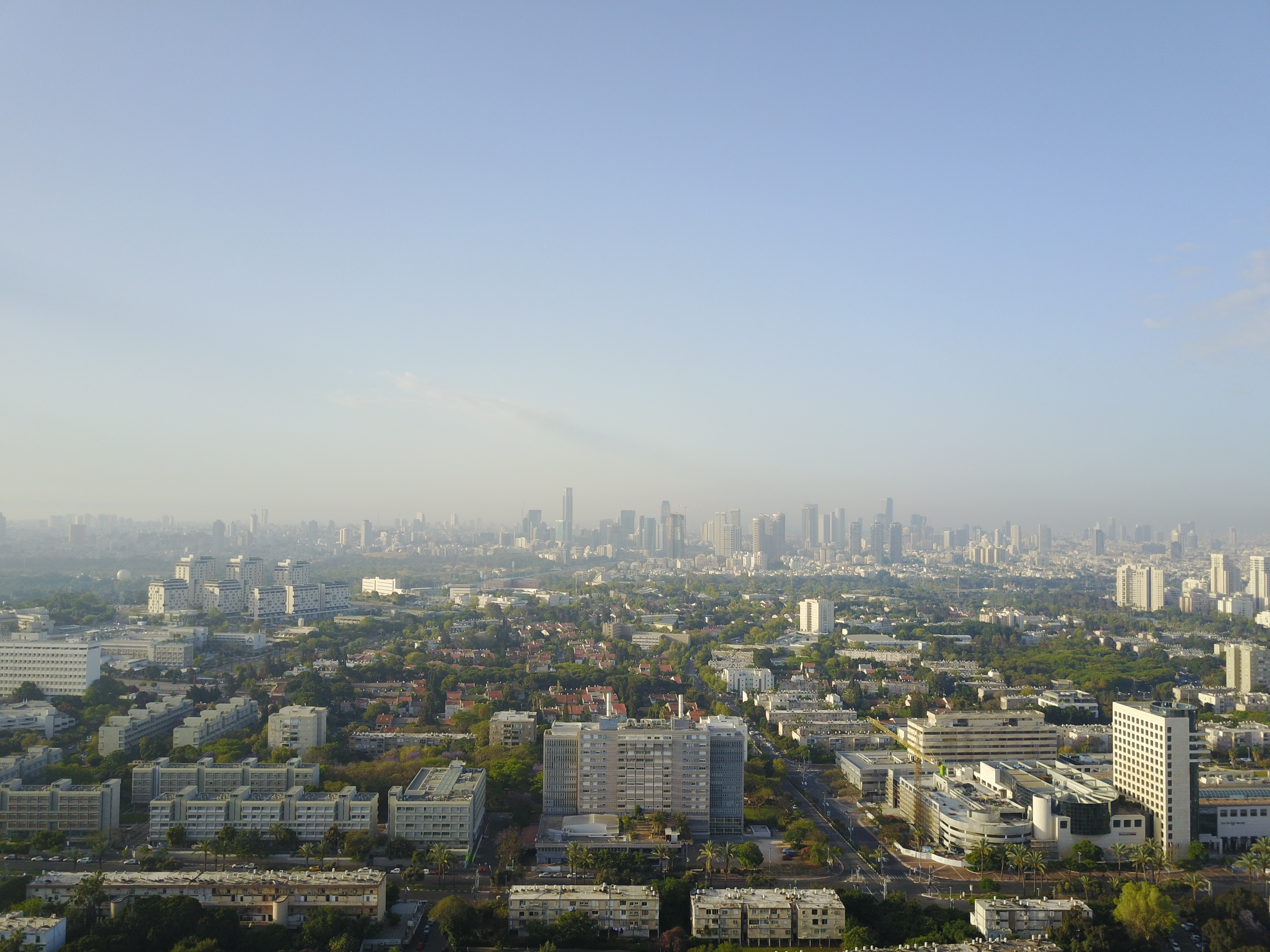
- Ramat Aviv Alef
- Interactive map of Ramat Aviv
- Coordinates: 32.114167°N 34.796944°E
- Country: Israel
- City: Tel Aviv
- Quarter: 1st Quarter of Tel Aviv

Area
  - Total: 2.321 km^{2} (0.896 sq mi)

Population (2012)
  - Total: 8,170
  - Density: 3,520/km^{2} (9,120/sq mi)

Median Age
  - Total: 33
  - Male: 31
  - Female: 36

Ramat Aviv Alef or Ramat Aviv HaYeruka, and originally plainly Ramat Aviv (Hebrew: רָמַת אָבִיב, lit. Spring Heights), is a neighborhood in northwest Tel Aviv, Israel. Ramat Aviv is bordered by Einstein Street in the north, Chaim Levanon Street to the east and south, and Namir Road in the west. The main streets in the neighborhood are Brodetzki and Reading. These five arterials are served by several bus lines each.

In the neighborhood are the Alliance High School and Ramat Aviv Mall. In the northeast of the neighborhood, opposite university campus, are student dorms of Tel Aviv University. Landmarks opposite the roads bordering the neighborhood are the main campus of Tel Aviv University, the Eretz Israel Museum, the Palmach Museum, and Anu – Museum of the Jewish People.

== History ==
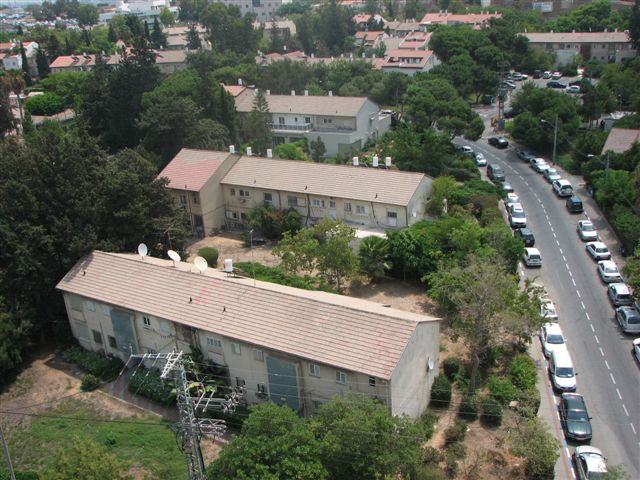
Buildings from the 1950s

In January 2011 it was published that remains of a building, believed to be 7,800–8,400 years old, were discovered in an archaeological excavation carried out in 8 Fichman Street in Ramat Aviv, by the Israel Antiquities Authority. The findings attest to permanent habitation on the northern bank of the Yarkon River.

Remains of a Samaritan synagogue were uncovered in Ramat Aviv and first reported in 1978 by archaeologist Haya Kaplan. The structure is dated to the early 7th century CE. The site yielded several mosaic inscriptions: one in Samaritan script naming two donors, and two in Greek — a donor inscription and a blessing on Israel and the house of worship.

Ramat Aviv was founded in 1950s following the great influx of immigrants from Eastern Europe. Golda Meir lived in the neighborhood from 1959 to 1978.

== Other neighborhoods of Tel Aviv with Ramat Aviv in the name ==
- Ramat Aviv Bet (Ramat Aviv B), usually referred to as Neve Avivim – north of Ramat Aviv Alef
- Ramat Aviv Gimel (Ramat Aviv C) – to the north of Neve Avivim.
- Ramat Aviv HaHadasha (New Ramat Aviv) – to the west of Neve Avivim

== See also ==
- History of Tel Aviv
