= Neve Sharret =

Neighborhood in Tel Aviv, Israel

Coordinates: 32.119°N 34.841°E

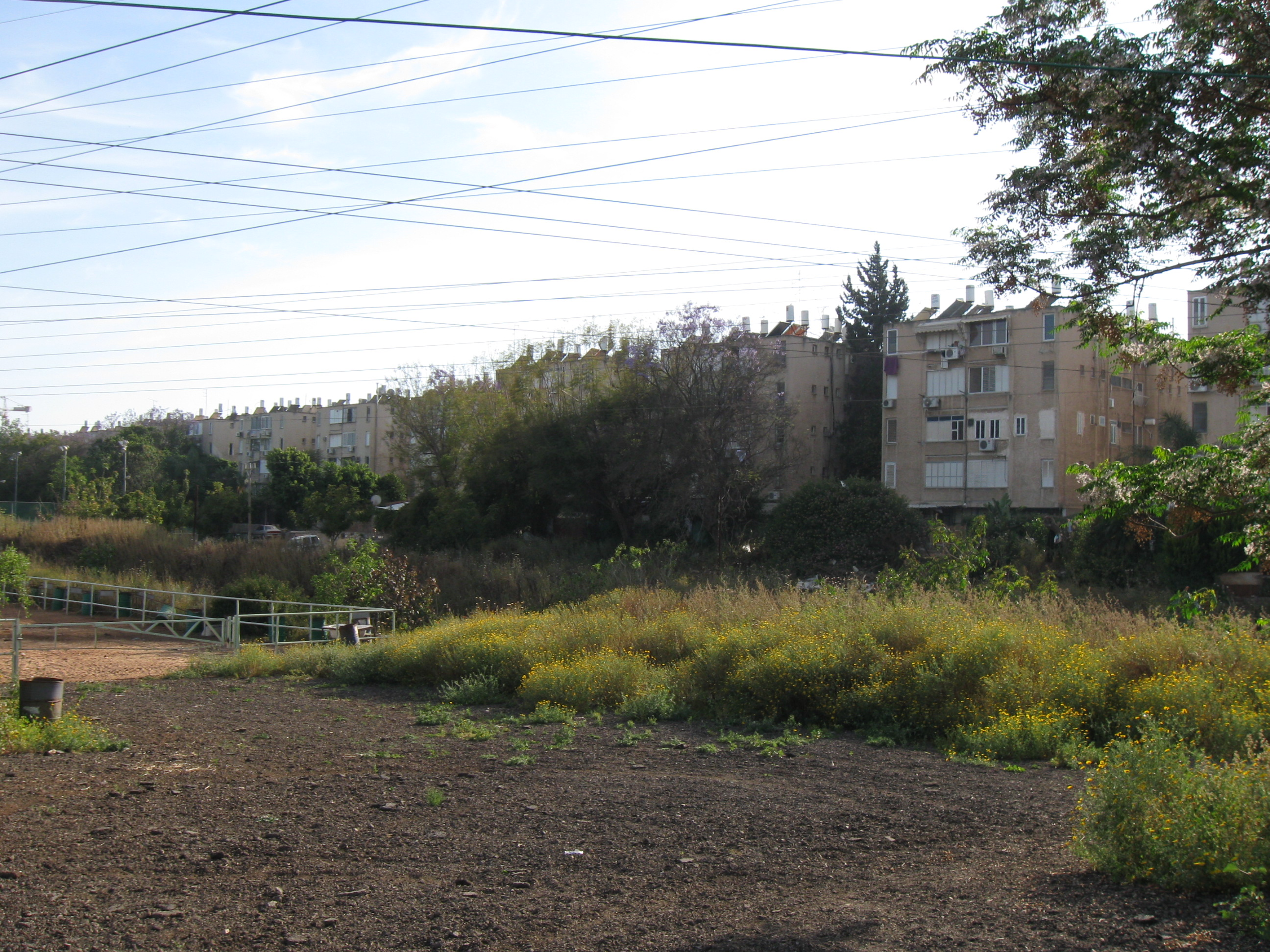
A view of northern Neve Sharet

Neve Sharett is an Israeli neighborhood in the Northeastern corner of Tel Aviv. It was founded in 1950 as the "Yad Hamavir" maabara transit camp and has a population of 7,200 people.

== History ==
Neve Sharett neighborhood, named after Israel's second prime minister, Moshe Sharett, was populated at first by North African immigrants, and like most neighborhoods that were founded in former ma'abarot (transit camps for immigrants) was mainly working class and low income. Beginning in the 1970s, the neighbourhood began a process of gentrification beginning with Prime Minister Menachem Begin's Shikum Schunot urban renewal project. Due to its location near the Atidim high tech park and the building of a neighborhood sports center ("country club"), beginning in the 2000s there has been a steep increase in construction and an influx of more affluent residents from the surrounding North Tel-Aviv neighborhoods. Today it is populated by its original inhabitants and their children, along with professionals and high tech workers who are new to the neighborhood and it is beginning to take up the look of its surrounding areas. Neve Sharett was the first neighborhood in Tel Aviv to host urban renewal. The first project was completed and populated in 2015, in Beit El Street. Two more projects have been populated since then.

== Transportation ==
Neve Sharett is situated right next to the Atidim high tech park which has a bus terminal with bus lines that serve the majority of the Tel Aviv Metropolitan Area. A station on the Green Line of the Tel Aviv Light Rail is planned to be constructed in the coming years.

== Population ==
Neve Sharett's population consists of descendants of the immigrants who moved there in the 1950s and '60s, the newer residents, and the Gur Chassidic group which has a community of about a thousand people in the neighborhood. Its population is 7,200.

== Urban Renewal ==
Neve Sharett was the first neighborhood in Tel Aviv to host urban renewal. The first project was completed and populated in 2015, in Beit El Street. Two more projects have been populated since then. Another project is currently under construction (2022), and more are in the planning stage. These projects have improved the living situations of the original inhabitants of the projects, giving them modern apartments, much larger and safer than their original homes, with underground parking, elevators and in-apartment security rooms. A large proportion of the additional apartments built, were bought by small investors, and are rented to young couples. Thus, the neighborhood has seen an influx of young families, which has served to rejuvenate the neighborhood school, kindergartens, the main commercial center between Beit El and Hatzanhanim streets (there is also a smaller one on Almagor Street with a cafe), and the neighborhood park, which incorporates a community park and a dog park. Besides the renewal of the park, additional children's playgrounds have been erected in walkways between neighborhood buildings. A renovation of the larger park that connects Neve Sharett and neighboring Tzahala, is planned by the municipality.

== See also ==
- History of Tel Aviv
