= 1938 Liga Gimel =

Liga Gimel
- Season: 1938

The 1938 Liga Gimel season was the third tier league of the Palestine League organized by the EIFA.

Ten teams played in the South division. As the Arab revolt intensified in fall 1938 and with the High commissioner issuing restrictive orders on travel throughout Palestine, the EIFA created a two-tiered league for the Tel Aviv region, with matches played in the league counting towards the national league. The Tel Aviv League was completed on 14 January 1939 and in February 1939 a new league season began, with teams playing in regionalized divisions instead a national league.

== North division ==
A north division was organized by the North League Committee, and matches in the division were due to start on 19 March 1938, However, it seems that matches in this division didn't start at all.

== South division ==
Pos	Team	Pld	W	D	L	GF	GA	GR	Pts
1	Montifiore Sport Club	9	7	1	1	27	10	2.700	15
2	Maccabi Herzliya	9	6	2	1	23	11	2.091	14
3	Maccabi Netanya	9	5	1	3	26	11	2.364	11
4	HaTehiya Tel Aviv	9	4	2	3	19	18	1.056	10
5	Hapoel Nes Tziona	9	4	1	4	20	21	0.952	9
6	Hapoel Petah Tikva	9	3	2	4	26	20	1.300	8
7	Hapoel Nahalat Yitzhak-Ramat Gan	9	3	2	4	20	20	1.000	8
8	Bait VeGan Sport Club	9	2	2	5	14	24	0.583	6
9	Hapoel Netanya	9	3	0	6	11	19	0.579	6
10	Hapoel Rehovot	9	1	1	7	4	36	0.111	3

Updated to match(es) played on 30 April 1938. Source: Protocol No. 38/15 IFA (in Hebrew)
Rules for classification: 1) points; 2) goal difference; 3) number of wins; 4) goals scored; 5) head to head; 6)deciding match.
