= Ramat Aviv HaHadasha =

Neighborhood in Tel Aviv, Israel

Coordinates: 32°7′5.66″N 34°47′31.15″E

Ramat Aviv HaHadasha רמת אביב החדשה
- Neighborhood of Tel Aviv
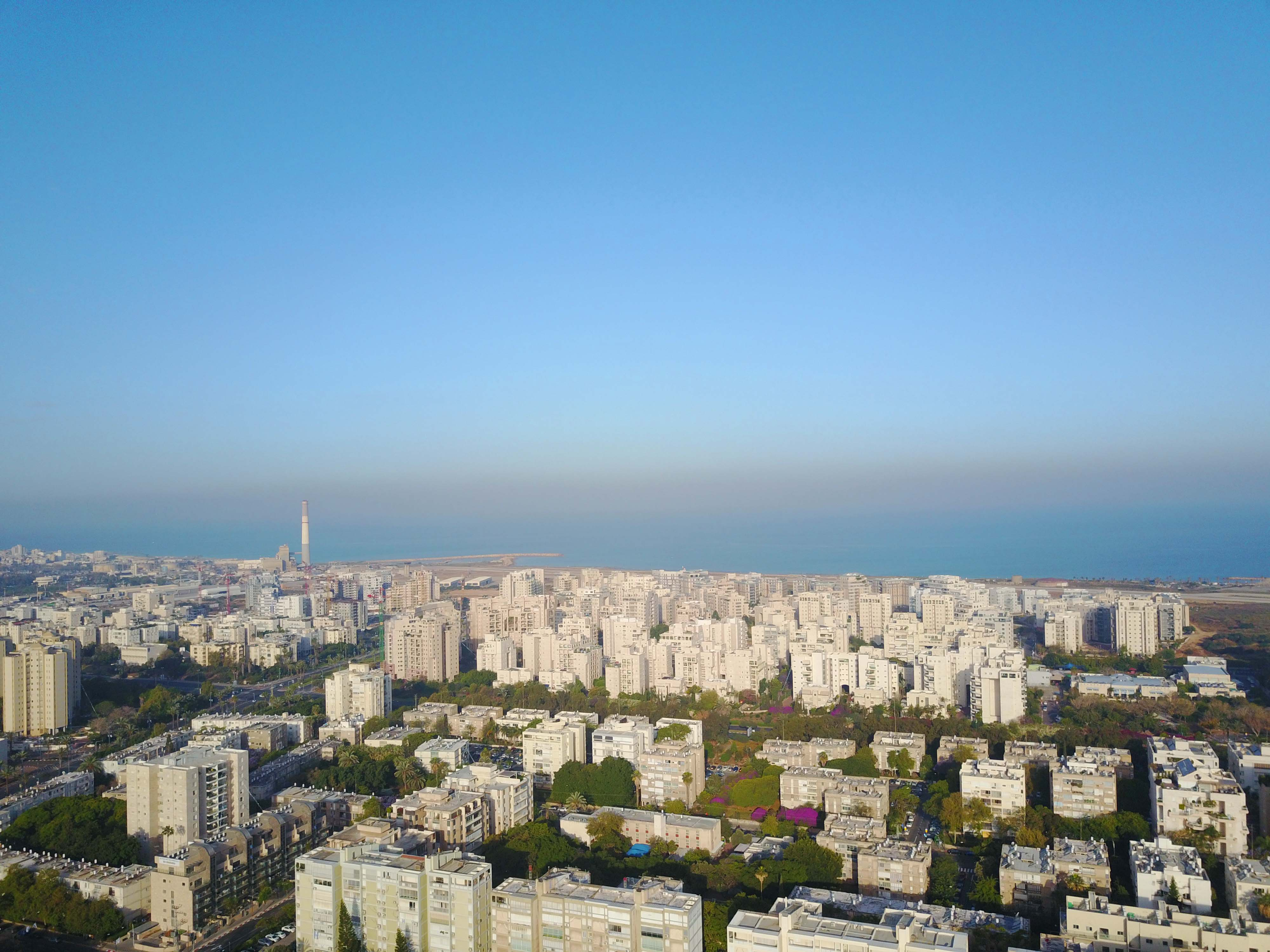
- Aerial view of the neighborhood
- Interactive map of Ramat Aviv HaHadasha
- Country: Israel
- City: Tel Aviv
- Established: 1990s

Ramat Aviv HaHadasha (Hebrew: רמת אביב החדשה, lit. 'New Ramat Aviv') is a residential neighborhood in Tel Aviv, Israel. It is located in the northwestern part of the city, north of Shikun Lamed and to the west of Neve Avivim.

Built in the 1990s, it is a relatively modern portion of the city, with white, cream and beige apartment buildings.

== See also ==
- History of Tel Aviv
