= Hadar Yosef =

Neighborhood in Tel Aviv, Israel

Coordinates: 32°6′37″N 34°49′13.57″E

Hadar Yosef הַדָר יוֹסֶף
- Neighborhood of Tel Aviv
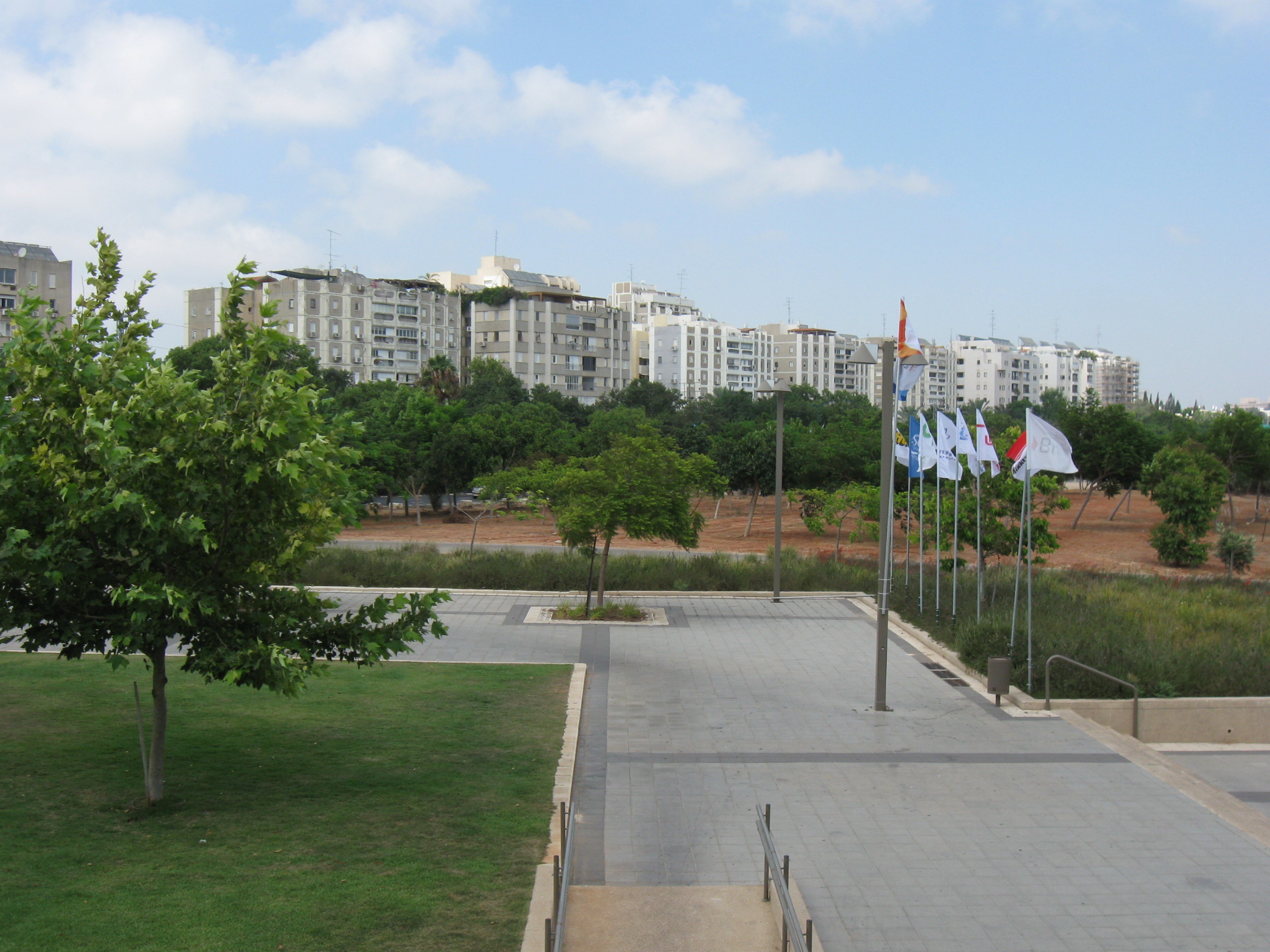
- Hadar Yosef
- Interactive map of Hadar Yosef
- Country: Israel
- City: Tel Aviv
- Established: 1946

Hadar Yosef (Hebrew: הַדָר יוֹסֶף, lit. 'Glory of Joseph') is a residential neighborhood in northeastern Tel Aviv, Israel. The neighborhood is located to the north of the Yarkon River and near the National Sport Center Tel Aviv.

== History ==
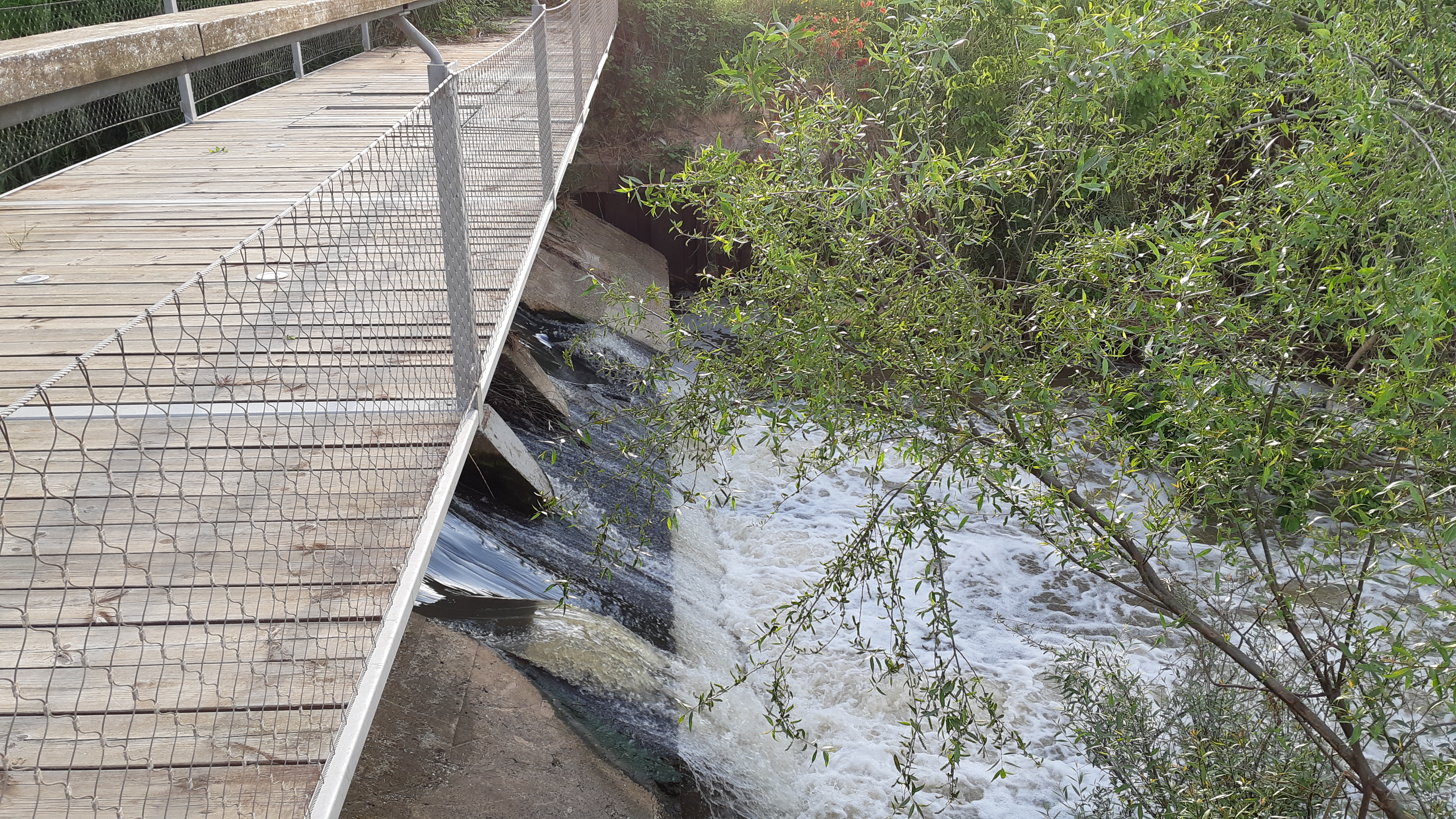
Ten Windmills/Hadar Yosef Bridge, showing the Ten Mills dam on the right side.

Hadar Yosef was established in 1946. The Ten Windmills Bridge (Hebrew: גשר עשר הטחנות, today Hadar Yosef Bridge) was built at the end of 1930s by the British Mandate government as part of a road connecting Kiryat Shaul, Ramat HaSharon and Herzliya to Tel Aviv. The neighborhood is named for Yosef Elisar who purchased the land.

The northern border is Mivtsah Kadesh street, with Bnei Ephraim to the west, Pinhas Rozen to the east and Shitrit street to the south. Neighboring neighborhoods are Shikun Dan, Neot Afeka A, Maoz Aviv, Kiryat Atidim, Ramat HaHayal and the Yarkon River. Most of the streets are named after Jewish communities destroyed in the Holocaust, among them Odessa, Warsaw, Lvov, Budapest, Luz, Bialystok, Chernov and Yassy. There were 7,190 people living in Hadar Yosef in 2014, many of whom worked in the neighboring Kiryat Atidim and Ramat HaHayal.

The headquarters of the Israel Gymnastics Federation are at 2 Shitrit Street, Hadar Yosef.

== See also ==
- History of Tel Aviv
