= Yisgav =

Neighborhood in Tel-Aviv

Yisgav ישגב
- Neighborhood
- Interactive map of Yisgav
- Coordinates: 32°6′40.4″N 34°50′2.78″E

Population (2007)
  - Total: 4,206

Yisgav (Hebrew: ישגב) is a residential neighborhood of Tel Aviv, Israel. It is located in the northeastern part of the city.

== History ==
Construction of the estate began in 1952.

== Geography ==
It is located on the northeastern edge of Tel Aviv, approximately 5 kilometers (3.1 mi) from the Mediterranean coast and less than 1 kilometer (0.62 mi) north of the Yarkon River, at an altitude of approximately 30 meters (98 ft). It borders the Kiryat Atidim business zone to the east, the Ramat Ha-Hayal neighborhood to the north, the Neve Dan neighborhood to the west, and the green belt along the Yarkon River to the south, where the new Asuta Tel Aviv Hospital building stands.
