= Neve Ofer =

Residential neighbourhood in Tel Aviv–Yafo, Israel

Neve Ofer נווה עופר
- Neighborhood of Tel Aviv
- Aerial view of the neighborhood
- Interactive map of Neve Ofer
- Country: Israel
- City: Tel Aviv
- Established: 1960s

Neve Ofer (Hebrew: נווה עופר), previously known as Tel Kabir (Hebrew: תל כביר) and Jaffa B (Hebrew: יפו ב', romanized: Yafo Bet), is a residential neighbourhood in Tel Aviv–Yafo, Israel. It was established in the late 1960s between Abu Kabir from the north, and Tell er-Rish (Tel Giborim in Holon) from the south.

Initially the neighbourhood was named after Tell El Kebir, the Egyptian hometown of the original settlers of Abu Kabir. On 26 April 1983, the neighbourhood was renamed after Avraham Ofer, the Minister of Housing in 1974–1977.

The neighbourhood is frequently considered the southernmost in South Tel Aviv and not part of Jaffa, although the Tel Aviv–Yafo Municipality considers it the easternmost in Quarter 7 (Jaffa).

Neve Ofer is the location of Tasso Cemetery, established in 1943 by the Muslim community of Jaffa. This is the only Muslim cemetery in Tel Aviv–Yafo still in use today.

== Gallery ==
Tel Kabir (Jaffa B) before the renaming, on a map of East Jaffa

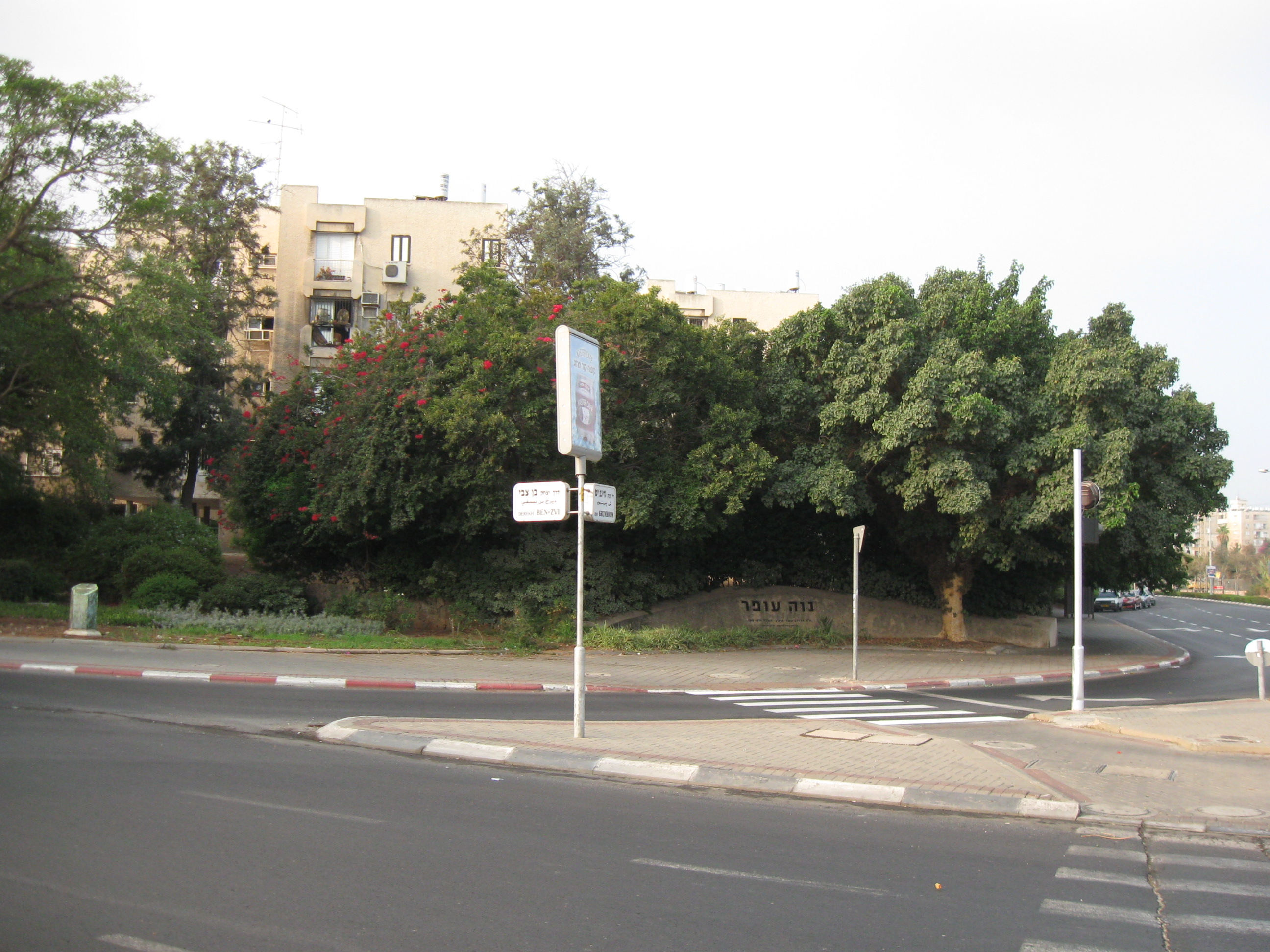
Memorial to Avraham Ofer

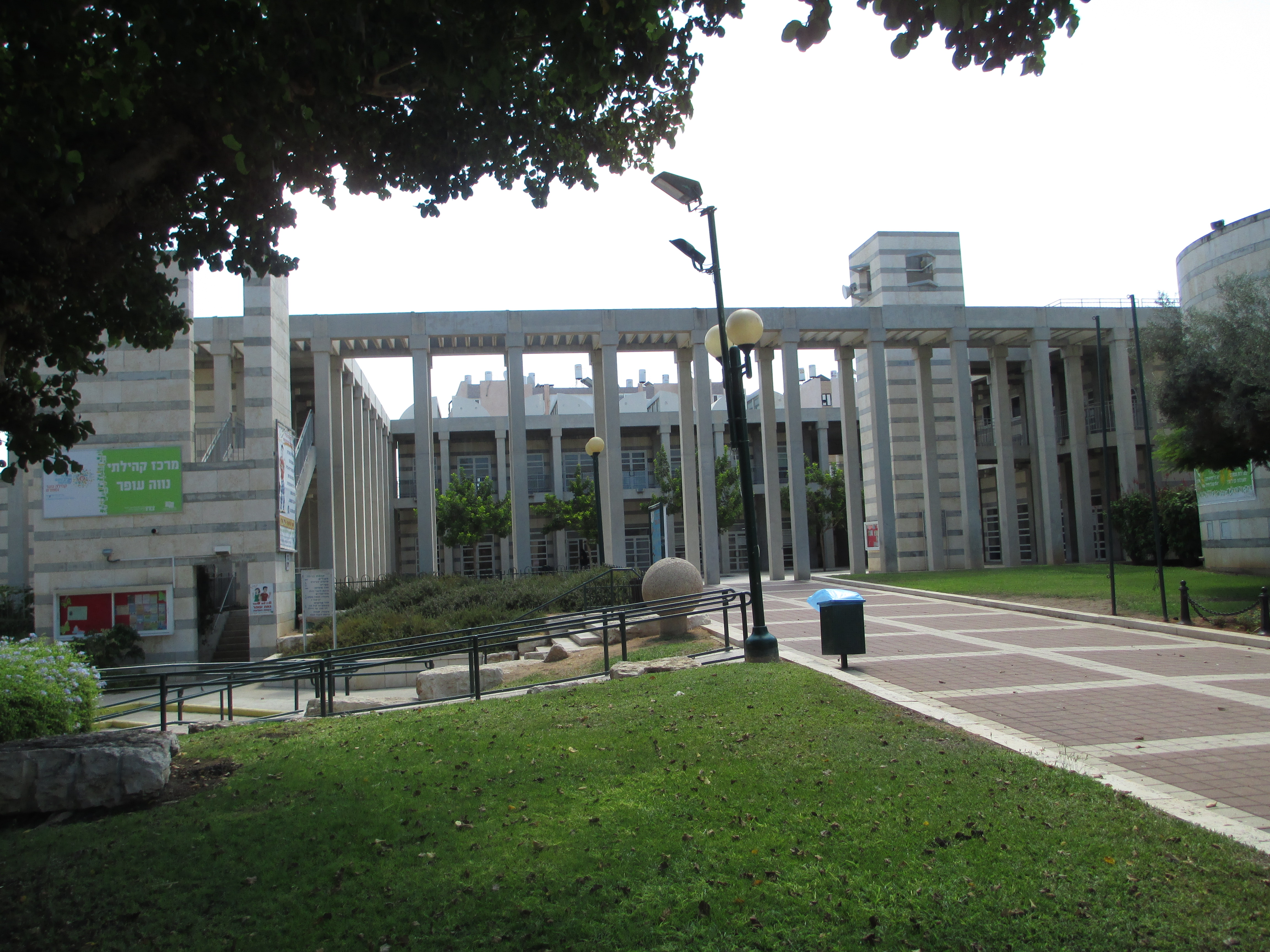
Community centre

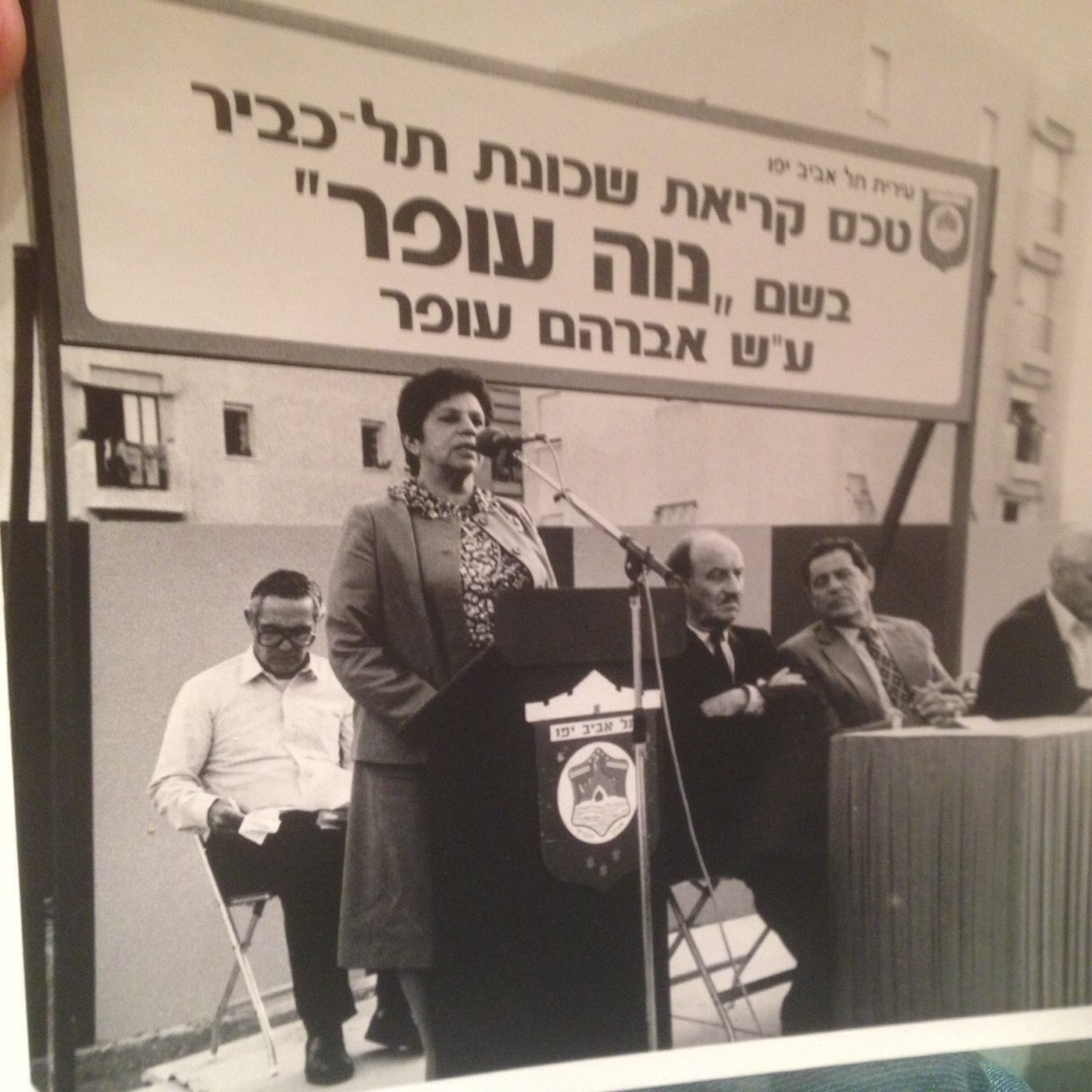
Neighborhood renamed to "Neve Ofer" in 1983

Dedication to Avraham Ofer

Memorial to victims of a helicopter crash

Memorial to fallen soldiers

Kielce Children's park memorial plaque
