= Ohel Moshe, Tel Aviv =

Neighborhood in Tel-Aviv

Coordinates: 32.062776°N 34.768187°E

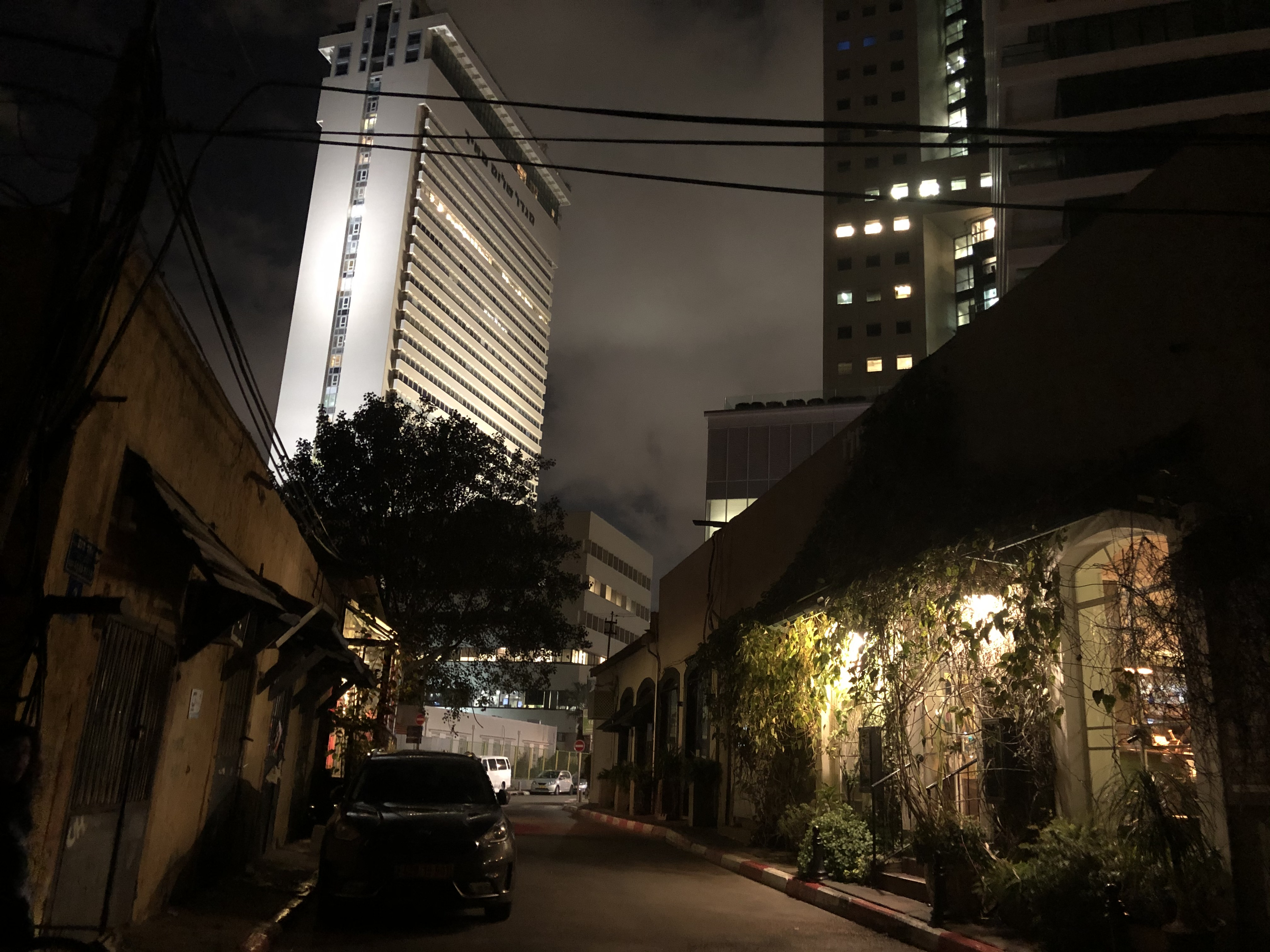

Ohel Moshe was a Jewish neighborhood which located Eastern-Northern to Jaffa, established in 1906. it was founded by Moshe Asulin, Moshe Elbaz and Moshe Attia, therefore its name. The neighborhood was inhabited mainly by Maghrebi Jews, with small numbers of Ashkenazi Jews and Yemenite Jews. It grew quickly and by 1922 its population was 936 inhabitants, living in 82 houses. In the 1920s, it has merged with Tel Aviv municipality.

== See also ==
- Neighborhoods of Tel Aviv
