= Yehuda HaMaccabi, Tel Aviv =

Neighborhood

Coordinates: 32.093791°N 34.788637°E

Yehuda Hamaccabi is a neighborhood in the north-central part of Tel Aviv. It is named after Judas Maccabeus, one of the great warriors in Jewish history, who led the Maccabean Revolt against the Seleucid Empire.

The neighborhood is bound by Pinkas Street to the south, Ibn Gvirol Street to the west, Namir Road to the east and Yarkon Park to the north.

The neighborhood is one of Tel Aviv's most affluent areas with a mix of low-rise apartment buildings and private villas. Once a quiet family residential area, it is now one of the most desirable real estate locations.

== History ==
Tel Aviv expanded north from its roots in Jaffa and the neighborhoods of Florentin and Neve Tzedek. Building began in Yehuda Hamaccabi in the 1960s and lasted through the 1970s. The neighborhood was initially populated with Central European Jewish immigrants, who had previously fled from both the Nazis and Communists. The apartment buildings, which were kept to a maximum of four floors were typically utilitarian style, whilst the villas were much more of the 'Mandate style' with flat roofs, tiled floors, manicured gardens and squared windows.

During the 1980s many of the villas were built over, replaced by luxury family houses, often with off-road parking and roof-top pools.

== Cultural references ==
Yehuda Hamaccabi whilst viewed as possessing a laid back atmosphere, is according to the city guide 'solidly bourgeois and Ashkenazi'.

The neighborhood is home to the Israeli Conservatory of Music and the Hungarian Embassy amongst others. It is still common to hear more elderly residents speaking Hungarian, German or the carefully enunciated old-fashioned Hebrew.

The neighborhood is most famous for its cafe culture, which is especially centered on Milano Square.

== See also ==
- Neighborhoods of Tel Aviv
