= National Sport Center Tel Aviv =

Stadium and sport facility compound in Tel Aviv, Israel

Coordinates: 32.104873°N 34.822463°E

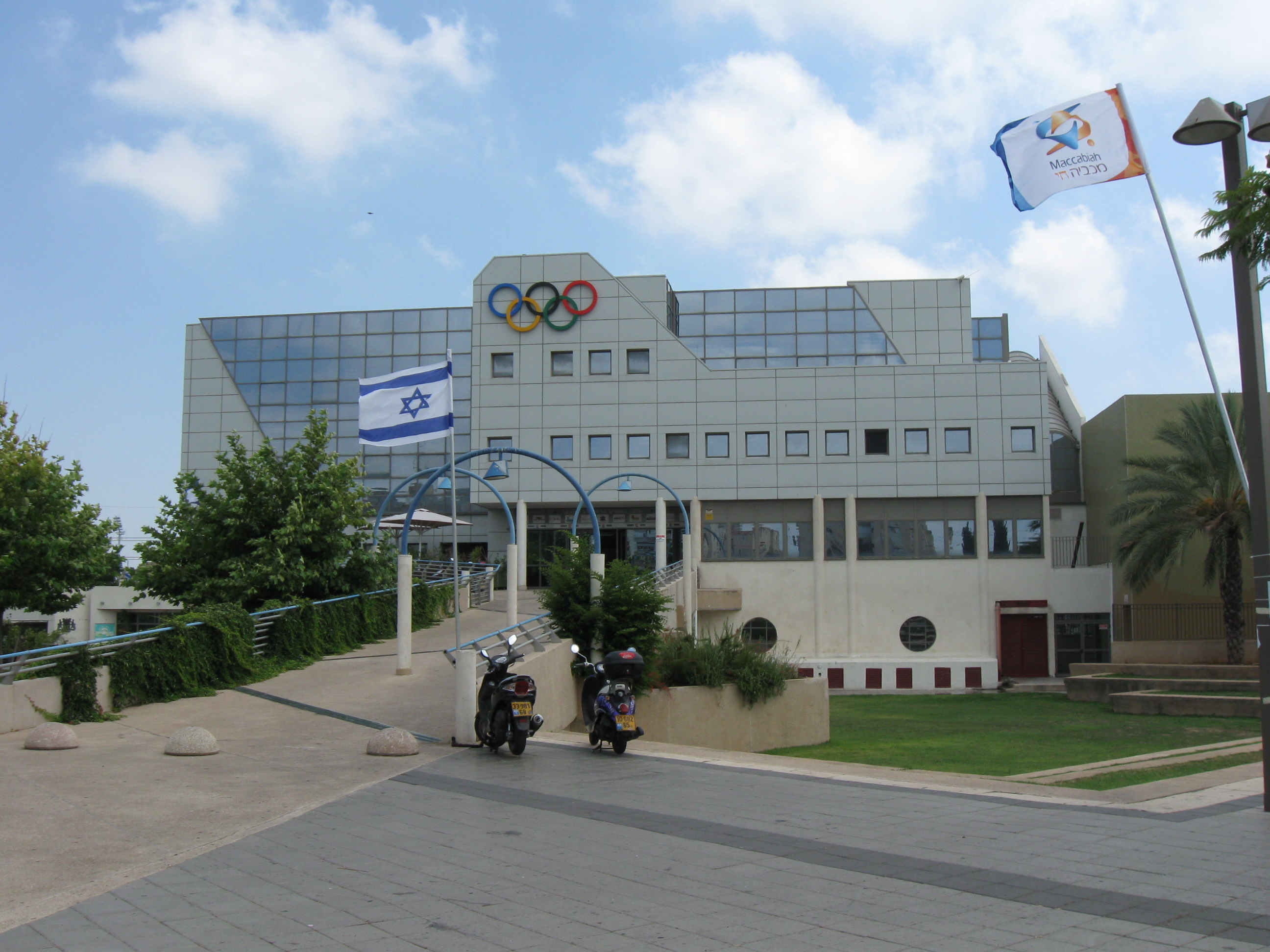
the Olympic Committee of Israel center – National Sport Center Tel Aviv

National Sport Center Tel Aviv (also Hadar Yosef Sports Center) is a compound of stadiums and sports facilities. It also houses the Olympic Committee of Israel and the National Athletics Stadium with the Israeli Athletic Association. Nearby is a multi-purpose sports hall with the Israel Judo Association and several Israeli sports associations. The National Sport Center Tel Aviv is located in the Hadar Yosef neighborhood in north Tel Aviv, in the Yarkon Park. Near the compound is the Ramat Gan Stadium.

National Sport Center Tel Aviv is a supplementary compound to Wingate Institute in Netanya. While most training is done at the Wingate Institute, the National Sport Center oversees sports processes.
