= Israel Gymnastics Federation =

Israel Gymnastics Federation איגוד ההתעמלות בישראל
- Formation: 1995
- Type: not-for-profit organization
- Purpose: Sport governing body
- Headquarters: Tel Aviv, Israel
- Location: 2 Shitrit Street, Hadar Yosef
- President/Chairman: Ziona Haris
- Parent organization: Fédération Internationale de Gymnastique
- Website: www.gym.org.il

The Israel Gymnastics Federation (איגוד ההתעמלות בישראל) is the national governing body for gymnastics in Israel.

The federation was founded in 1995, and is a not-for-profit organization. It promotes all types of gymnastics in Israel.

Its headquarters are at 2 Shitrit Street, Hadar Yosef, Tel Aviv, in Israel. The Federation's President/Chairman is Ziona Haris, its Secretary General/CEO is Sarit Shenar, and its President is Kineret Tzedef (Gancharski).

The Federation is a member of Fédération Internationale de Gymnastique (FIG), and of the European Union of Gymnastics (UEG).
