= Walworth Barbour =

American diplomat

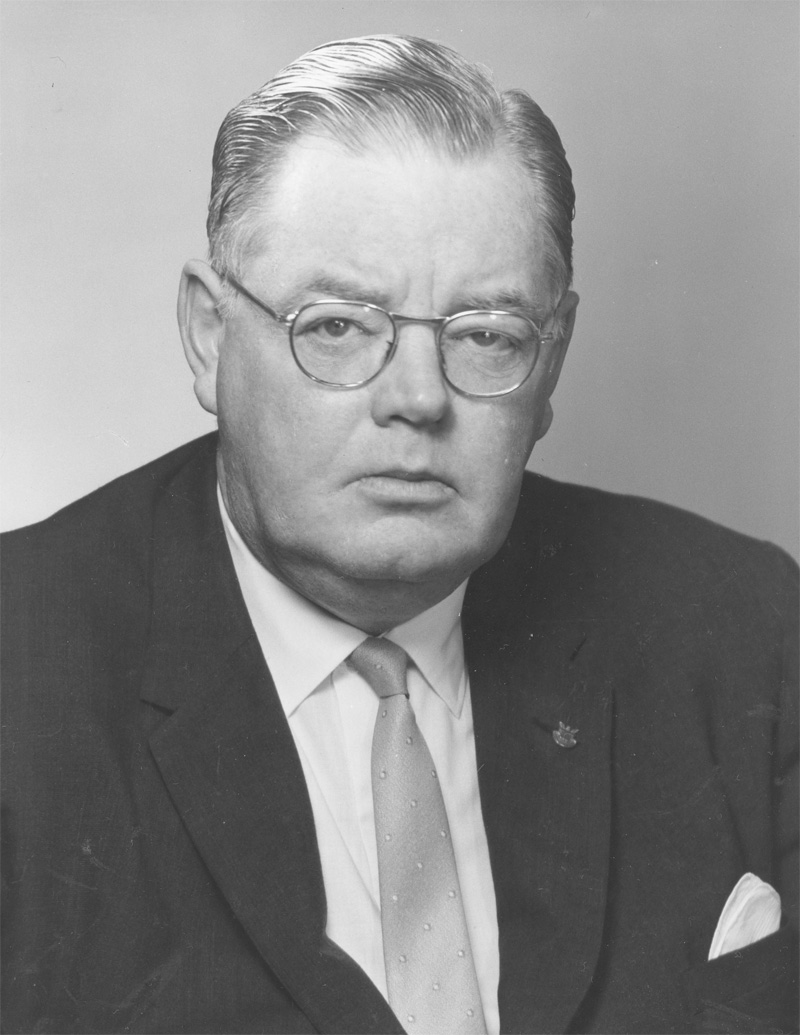

United States Ambassador to Israel
- In office 1961–1973
- President: John F. Kennedy; Lyndon B. Johnson; Richard Nixon

Personal details
- Born: June 4, 1908 Cambridge, Massachusetts
- Died: July 21, 1982 (aged 74) Gloucester, Massachusetts
- Occupation: Diplomat

Walworth "Wally" Barbour (June 4, 1908 – July 21, 1982) was the United States Ambassador to Israel from 1961 to 1973.

== Biography ==
A graduate of Harvard University, Barbour was one of the longest serving American diplomats in a foreign post, and was described by the Jerusalem Post as a "sagacious political intelligence who could continuously and precisely define for his own country and for his hosts the political aims of both, and more specifically the limits and tolerance of both." In 1961 Barbour was appointed as Ambassador to Israel by President John F. Kennedy. He remained at the post through the administration of Lyndon B. Johnson and passed up an appointment as Ambassador to the Soviet Union by Richard Nixon.

He was considered as a diplomat who was sensitive to the needs of Israel. At a dinner in his honor, Israel Prime Minister Golda Meir said about Barbour "There's no big deal in having an Israel-American friendship society when you have friends like Nixon in the White House and Wally in Israel."

After the USS Liberty incident during the 1967 Six-Day War, Barbour played a crucial part in determining that the Israeli government had lied regarding certain aspects of their explanation as to how the attack happened. After an Israeli claim appeared in The Washington Post that they had inquired about the presence of US. ships in the area before the attack, Secretary of State Dean Rusk telegrammed the U.S. embassy in Tel Aviv and demanded “urgent confirmation.” Barbour confirmed that Israel’s story was bogus: “No request for info on U.S. ships operating off Sinai was made until after Liberty incident. Had Israelis made such an inquiry it would have been forwarded immediately to the chief of naval operations and other high naval commands and repeated to dept.”

Barbour also arrived at a time of extreme US sensitivity over Israel's burgeoning nuclear weapons development at Dimona in the Negev desert.

He was also a diplomat in Greece, Bulgaria, Italy, Iraq and Egypt, and in the early 1950s he was counselor of the U.S. Embassy in Moscow. He retired from the Foreign Service after he left Israel in 1973.

The Walworth Barbour American International School in Israel (WBAIS) in Even Yehuda, Israel, as well as a neighborhood and a youth center in Tel-Aviv, are named after him.

== Positions held in the United States Diplomatic Service ==
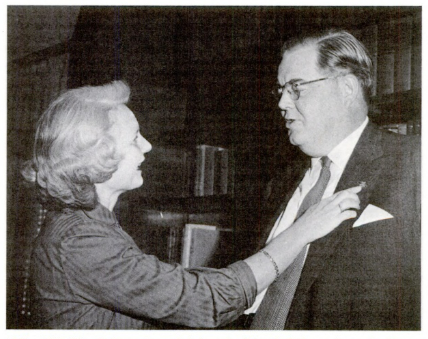
Ellen Barbour admires the 30-year Length of Service Award pinned on the lapel of her brother, Ambassador Walworth Barbour

- US Ambassador to Israel (1961–73)
- US State Department Deputy Chief of Mission, London, England (1955–60)
- US State Department Deputy Assistant Secretary for European Affairs (1954–55)
- US State Department Consul, Moscow, USSR (1949–51)
- US State Department Chief, Division of South European Affairs (1947–49)
- US State Department Assistant Chief, Division of South European Affairs (1945–46)
- US State Department Second Secretary-Vice Consul, Athens, Greece (1944–45)
- US State Department Second Secretary, near Govts. in exile of Greece and Yugoslavia at Cairo (1943–44)
- US State Department Second Secretary-Vice Consul, Cairo, Egypt(1942–43)
- US State Department Third Secretary-Vice Consul, Sofia, Italy (1939–41)
- US State Department Third Secretary-Vice Consul, Baghdad (1936–39)
- US State Department Vice Consul, Athens, Greece (1933–36)
- US State Department Vice Consul, Naples, Italy (1931–32)

== See also ==
- Origins of the Six-Day War
- Samu Incident

Diplomatic posts
Preceded by Ogden Rogers Reid	U.S. Ambassador to Israel; 1961–1973	Succeeded by Kenneth B. Keating
