= Tzahalon =

Neighborhood in Tel-Aviv

Coordinates: 32°2′40.97″N 34°45′19.05″E

Tzahalon צהלון
- Neighborhood of Tel Aviv
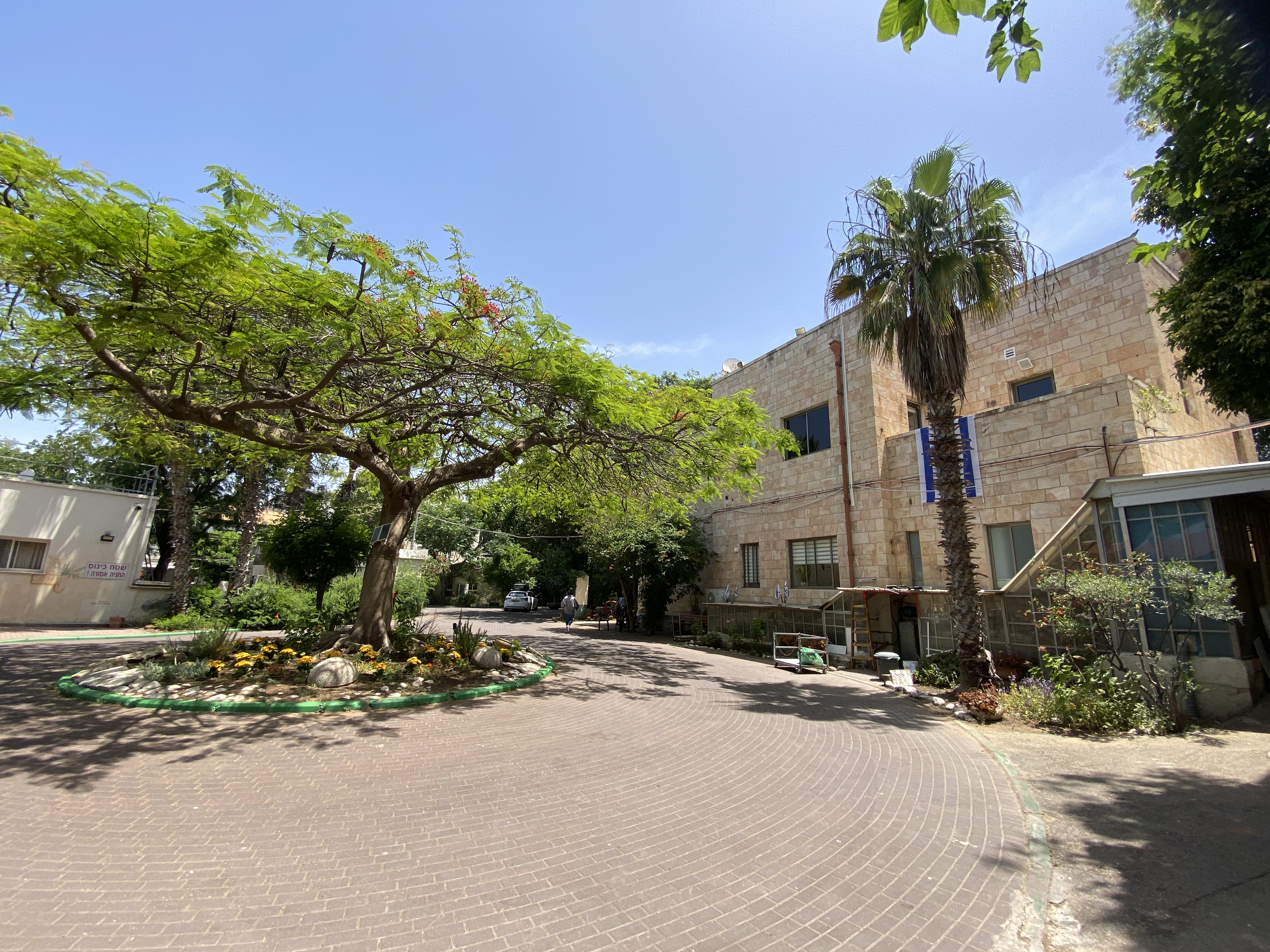
- Tzahalon hospital
- Interactive map of Tzahalon
- Country: Israel
- City: Tel Aviv
- Established: 1950s

Tzahalon (Hebrew: צהלון) is a residential neighborhood of Tel Aviv, Israel. It is located just south of central Jaffa and just east of the Ajami neighborhood. Notable buildings include the music hall the East West House, featuring world music on a regular basis.

The neighborhood has been noted for its steady population.

== Geography ==
Tzahalon is located on the southwestern edge of Tel Aviv, about 1 km (0.62 mi) from the Mediterranean coast and from the historic center of Jaffa, at an altitude of about 20 m (66 ft). It is bordered by the Dakar district to the southeast, and Shikunei Hisachon to the south.
