= Tokhnit Lamed =

Neighborhood in Tel-Aviv

Coordinates: 32°6′28.69″N 34°47′24.5″E

Tokhnit Lamed תָּכְנִית לָמֶד
- Neighborhood of Tel Aviv
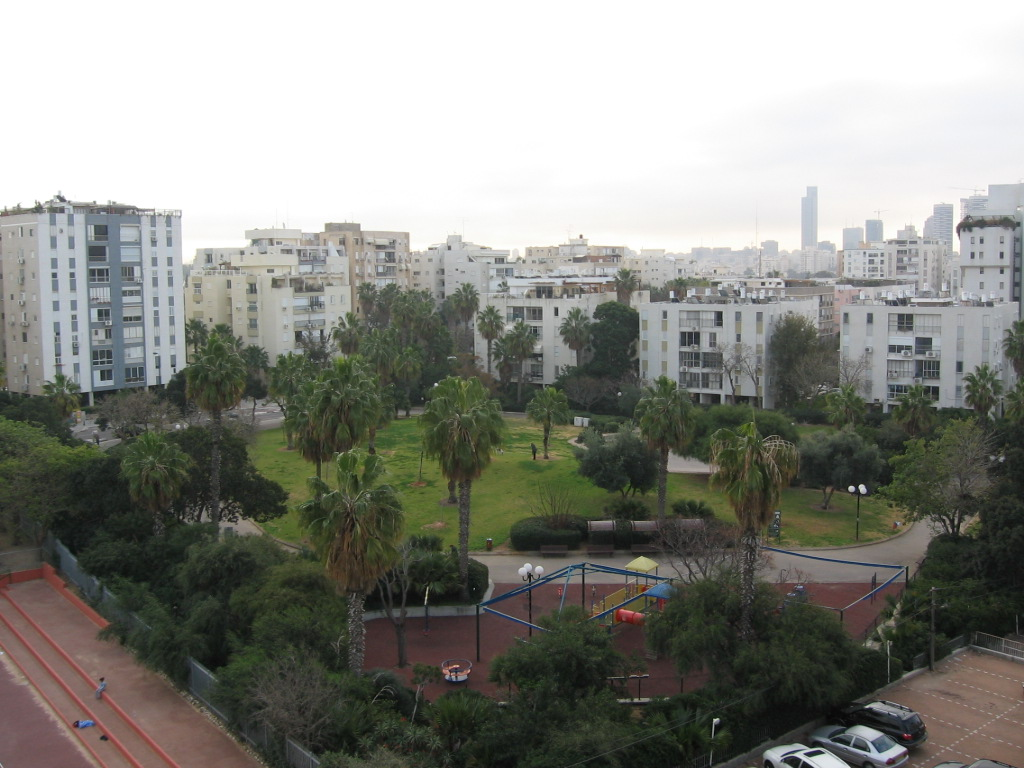
- Shikoon Lamed
- Interactive map of Tokhnit Lamed
- Country: Israel
- City: Tel Aviv
- Established: 1970s

Area
  - Total: 0.873 km^{2} (0.337 sq mi)

Population (2012)
  - Total: 5,370
  - Density: 6,150/km^{2} (15,900/sq mi)

Tokhnit Lamed (Hebrew: תָּכְנִית לָמֶד, lit. 'Plan 30'), also known simply as Lamed (Hebrew: לָמֶד, lit. '30'), is a residential neighborhood in the northwestern part of Tel Aviv, Israel.

In 2012, Lamed's population was 5,370, and its area was 873 dunams (0.873 km^{2}), of which about 254 dunams (0.254 km^{2}) were built up. Most of its structures were built in the 1970s.

A 2016 poll by Walla! ranked Lamed as Israel's most beloved urban neighborhood.

== See also ==
- History of Tel Aviv
