= Neve Dan =

Residential neighborhood

Coordinates: 32°6′42.56″N 34°49′44.71″E

Neve Dan נווה דן
- Neighborhood of Tel Aviv
- A street in Neve Dan
- Interactive map of Neve Dan
- Country: Israel
- City: Tel Aviv
- Established: 1947

Neve Dan (Hebrew: נווה דן), also Shikun Dan (Hebrew: שיכון דן), is a residential neighborhood of Tel Aviv, Israel. It is located in the northeastern part of the city. It is named after the tribe of Dan, whose first living place was here.

== History ==
Neve Dan was founded as Yad HaMa'avir (Hebrew: יד המעביר). Construction started in 1947 and completed in 1950. The neighborhood was built to house the employees of the Dan Bus Company.

In 1953 Yad HaMa'avir was incorporated into Tel Aviv. In 1957 the neighborhood's housing, previously owned by the Israeli government, was handed over to the residents.

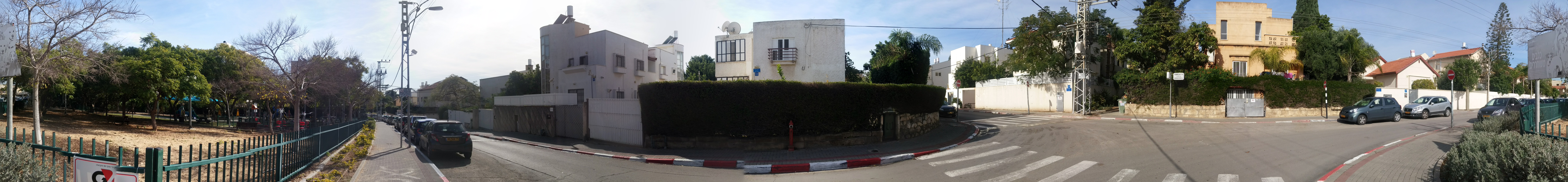
Streets in Neve Dan

== See also ==
- History of Tel Aviv
