= Neve Tzahal =

Neighborhood in Tel-Aviv

- Neighborhood
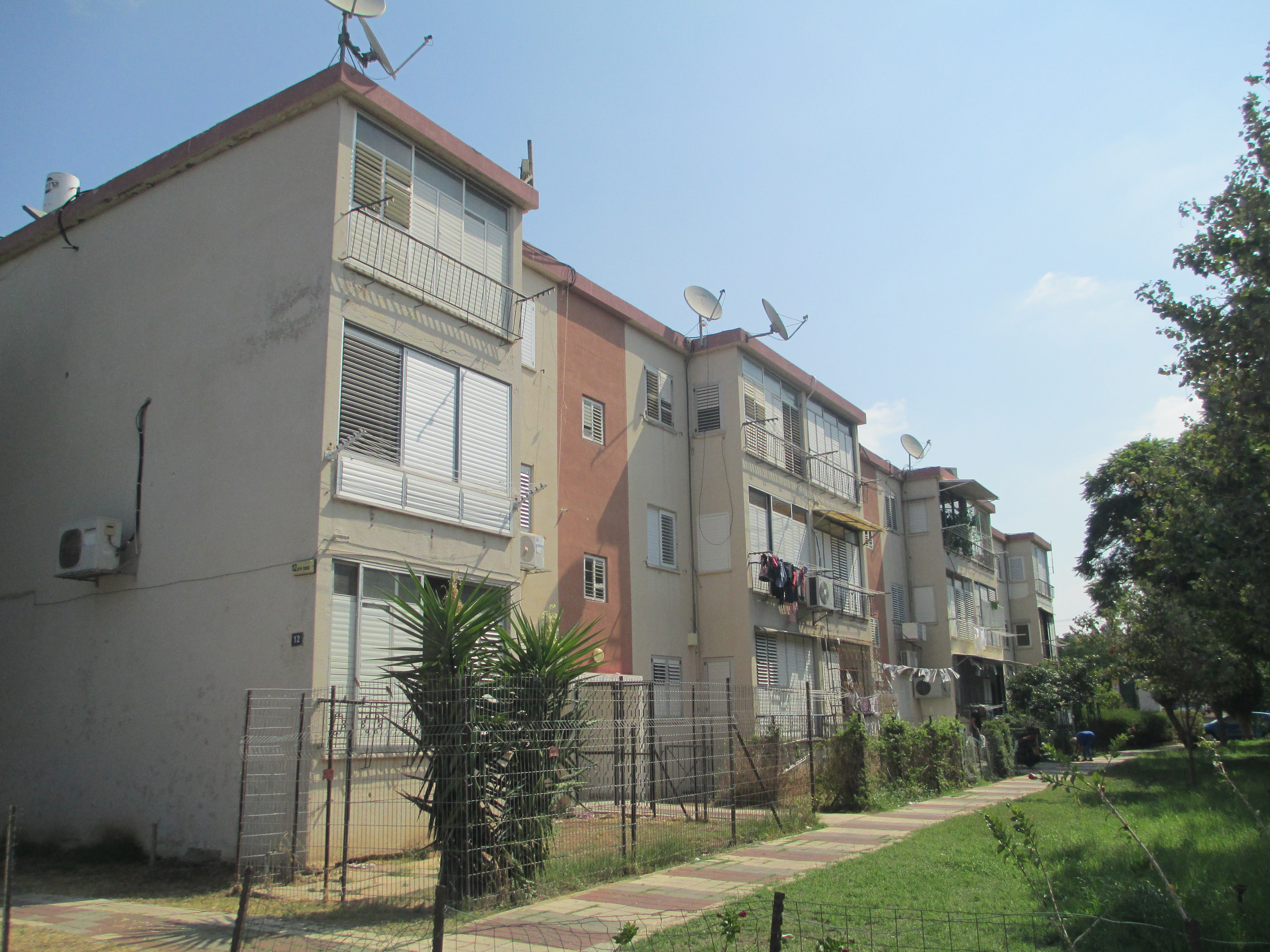
- Apartments at Neve Tzahal
- Interactive map of Neve Tzahal
- Coordinates: 32°3′5.92″N 34°47′52.85″E
- Country: Israel

Neve Tzahal is a neighborhood of Tel Aviv, Israel. It is located in the southern part of the city. The neighborhood was built 1950-1951 between Kfar Shalem and Shechunat Hatikva and originally housed military families.
