= Nahalat Yitzhak =

Neighborhood in Tel Aviv, Israel

Coordinates: 32°04′32″N 34°47′55″E

Nahalat Yitzhak נחלת יצחק
- Neighborhood of Tel Aviv
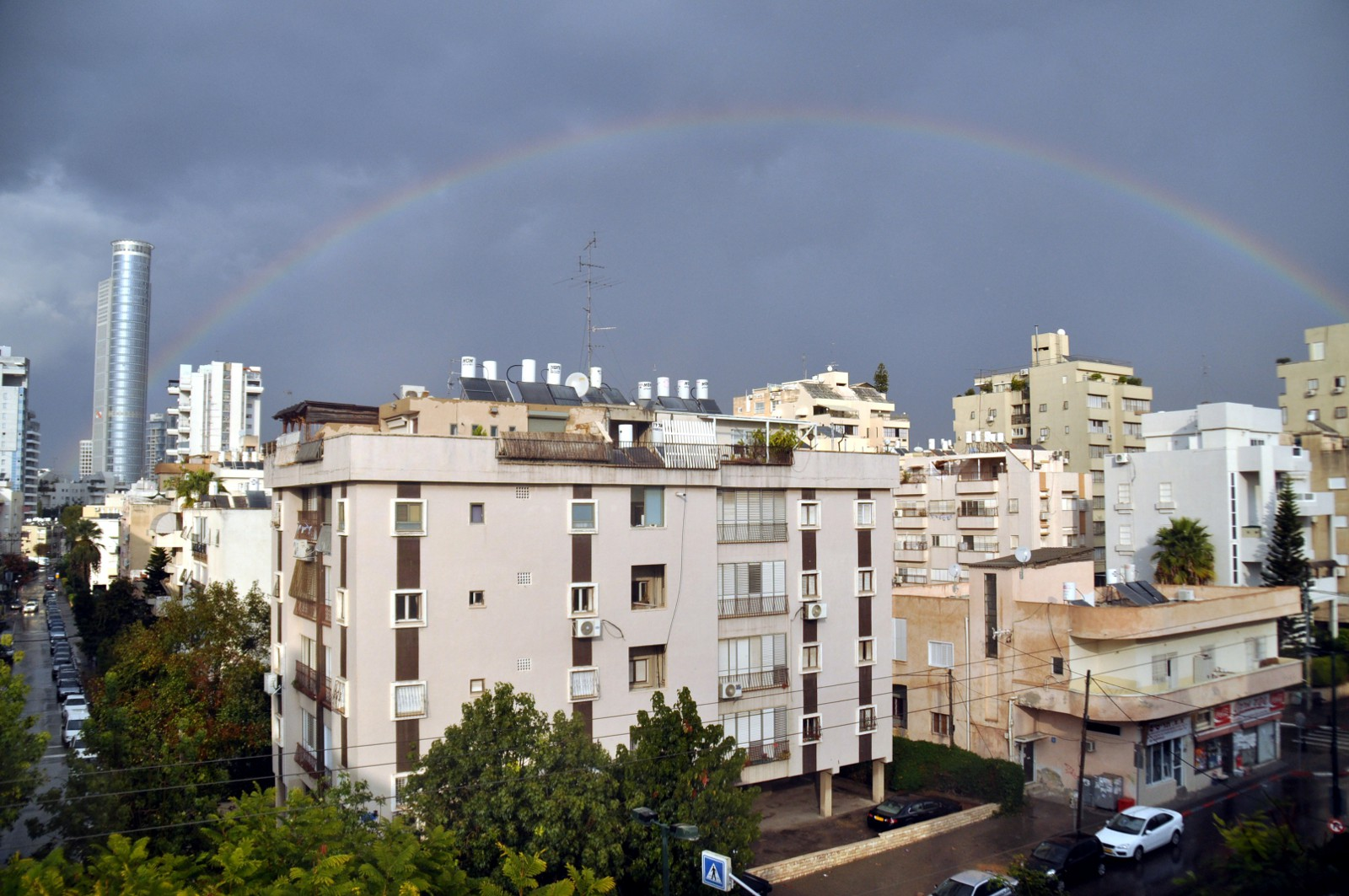
- Rainbow over Emek Bracha and Ziman Streets in Nahalat Yitzhak
- Interactive map of Nahalat Yitzhak
- Country: Israel
- City: Tel Aviv
- Established: 1925

Nahalat Yitzhak (Hebrew: נחלת יצחק) is a neighborhood of Tel Aviv, Israel.

== Name ==
Nahalat Yitzhak literally means "Yitzhak's Estate" in Hebrew. The neighborhood is named after Rabbi Yitzchak Elchanan Spektor, Chief Rabbi of Kovno, who wrote a book called Nachal Yitzchok (River of Yitzchok). The Hebrew word Nahala (נחלה), meaning heritage or estate, is widely used for toponyms in Israel.

== History ==
Nahalat Yitzhak was founded in 1925, east of the Ayalon River, by a group of Jews who came from Kaunas (Kovno), Lithuania.

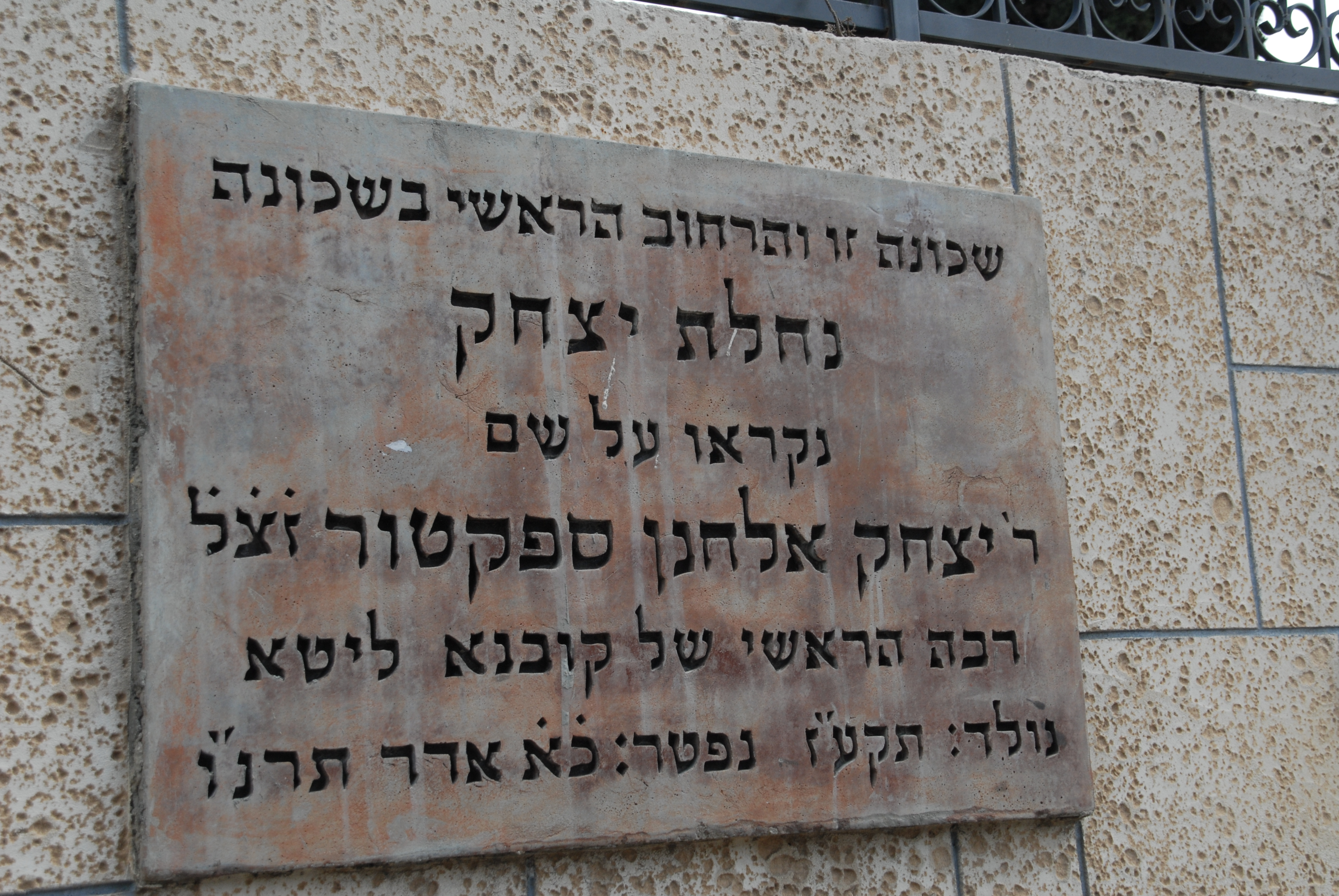
Hebrew plaque citing the name of the neighborhood

In 1931, the neighborhood had 36 houses and a population of 134 people. It was established on the border of the German Templer colony of Sarona, adjacent to the Borochov neighborhood, the first neighborhood of Giv'atayim. At the beginning it was a farming neighborhood of homesteads. Later a number of industrial plants were built on the neighborhood's outskirts, among them "Tara Dairies", "Yitzhar" factory (the area where Tel Aviv Towers stand), and a number of flour mills.

Nahalat Yitzhak became part of Tel Aviv on 10 January 1946. In 1958 the interior minister annexed the neighborhood to Giv'atayim, but the Israel Supreme Court reversed the decision after it became clear that the position of opponents of the annexation were not heard, and the neighborhood remained in the jurisdiction of Tel Aviv.

== See also ==
- Nahalat Yitzhak Cemetery
