= Azorei Hen =

North-Western neighborhood in Tel Aviv

Azorei Hen אזורי ח"ן
- Neighborhood
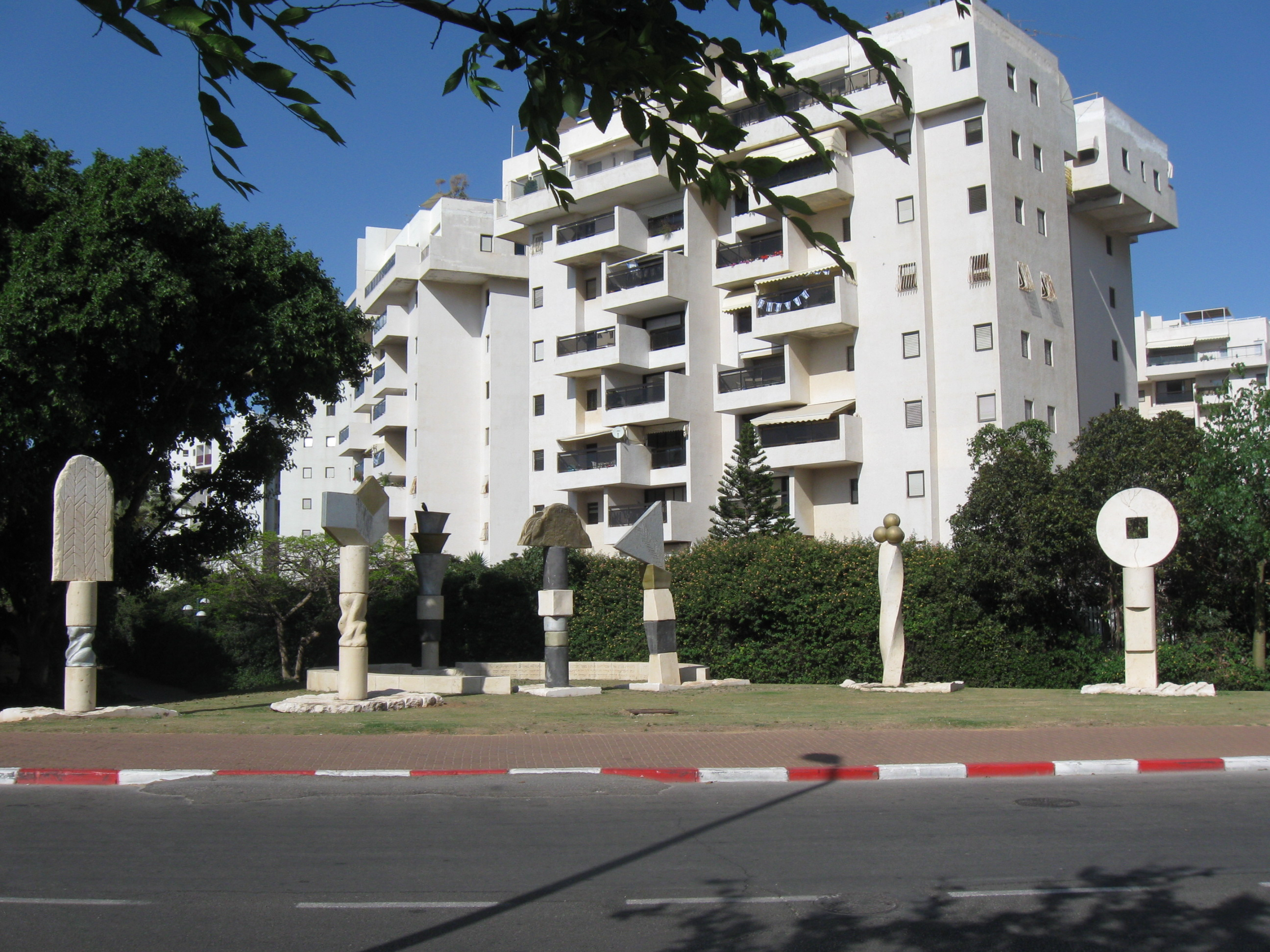
- Residential buildings in Azorei Hen
- Interactive map of Azorei Hen
- Coordinates: 32°07′45″N 34°47′53″E
- Country: Israel
- City: Tel Aviv

Population
  - Total: 3,000

Azorei Hen (Hebrew: אזורי ח"ן) is a residential neighborhood of Tel Aviv, Israel. It is located in the northwestern part of the city, and houses about 3,000 residents. It is named after Hannah Ne'eman (initials "hen").

== History ==
Azorei Hen was founded in the 1980s on an empty and isolated area, as a closed neighborhood, by the Azorim development company. The main part of the neighborhood was built in the 1990s and 2000s.
