= Tel Baruch =

Neighborhood of Tel Aviv, Israel

Coordinates: 32°07′N 34°49′E

Tel Baruch תל ברוך
- Neighborhood of Tel Aviv
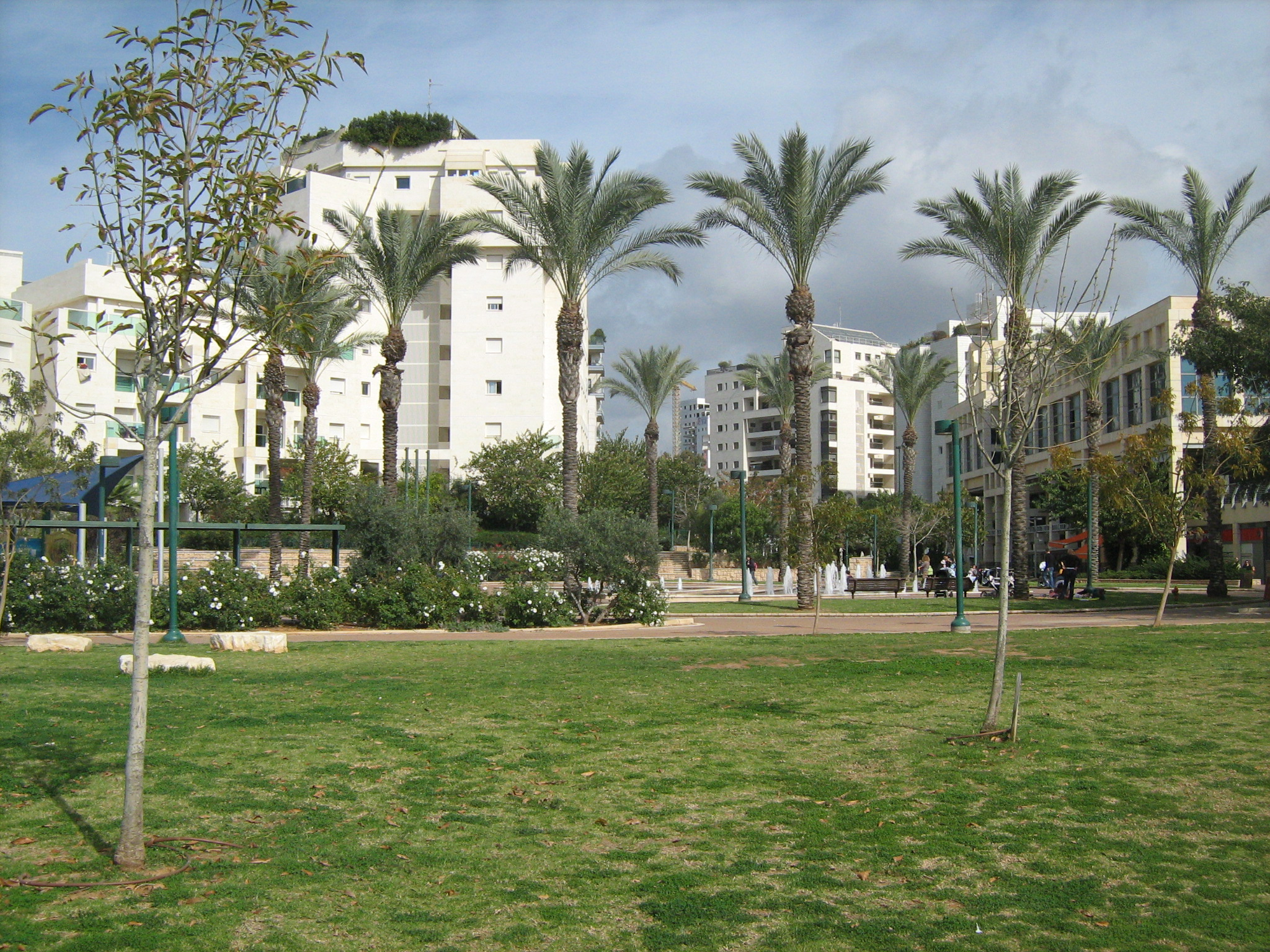
- Northern Tel Baruch
- Interactive map of Tel Baruch
- Country: Israel
- City: Tel Aviv
- Established: 1940s

Tel Baruch (Hebrew: תל ברוך) is a luxury neighborhood dating back to 1947, located on the northern side of the Yarkon River, in the northeast of Tel Aviv, Israel.

== History ==
The areas of Tel Baruch south of KKL-JNF Boulevard was founded in 1946, and was the first neighborhood built north of the Yarkon River. It was named after Mordechai (Marko) Yosef Baruch (1872–1899), a Zionist activist in Algeria, Bulgaria, Egypt and Italy. The first inhabitants of the neighborhood were immigrants from Turkey and Bulgaria, and were resettled in October 1947. In the first stage, 32 housing units were built in the neighborhood, and the neighborhood continued north of KKL-JNF Boulevard in 1949–1950. The elementary school of the poet Yehuda Alharizi was inaugurated in 1951. At the beginning of the Six-Day War, Tel Baruch was hit by an artillery shell from Qalqiliya.

Then in the 1990s, the neighborhood began to expand northwards, known as Tel Baruch North. More than 70% of the construction in this area is made up of saturated residential buildings of 4-8 floors, and the rest are villas. It has a shopping center called Mikado Center, a Naomi Shemer elementary school and a boarding school for children from families that can not grow them normatively. During the British Mandate there was a military camp.

The two parts of the neighbourhood are considered luxurious and combine large areas of public parks and woods, and a beach.

== Notable residents ==
- Ron Huldai
- Galit Gutmann
- Avi Gabbay
- Quentin Tarantino

== See also ==
- History of Tel Aviv
