= Project Renewal (Israel) =

Project Renewal (Hebrew: פרויקט שיקום שכונות, Proyect shikum shchunot) is the joint program of the government of Israel and the Jewish Agency for Israel for rehabilitation of distressed neighborhoods. It was announced in 1977 by the Eighteenth government of Israel headed by Prime Minister Menachem Begin, in which 160 underprivileged areas in Israel were upgraded.

Since the decision was taken on the project, 210 neighborhoods were identified as underprivileged neighborhood, in 70 neighborhoods the project was completed, and will be performed in dozens of other neighborhoods. In the 160 of the first neighborhoods in which the project was implemented, the Population is about one million. Among the neighborhoods that participated in the project one may find: Pat, Baka, Talpiot, and Ramat Amidar.
