= Neve Barbur =

Neighborhood in Tel-Aviv

Neve Barbur נווה ברבור
- Interactive map of Neve Barbur
- Coordinates: 32°3′7.03″N 34°48′5.98″E
- Country: Israel

Neve Barbur is a neighborhood of Tel Aviv, Israel, named after Walworth Barbour, and located in the southeastern part of the city.

Neve Barbur was built in the 1970s, along with similar neighborhoods, after parts of Kfar Shalem (formerly Salama) were evicted of their Jewish population. In contrast to now neighboring Kfar Shalem, Neve Barbur is a high rise neighborhood.
