= Tzahala =

Neighborhood in Tel-Aviv

Coordinates: 32°7′21.42″N 34°50′12.82″E

Tzahala צהלה
- Neighborhood
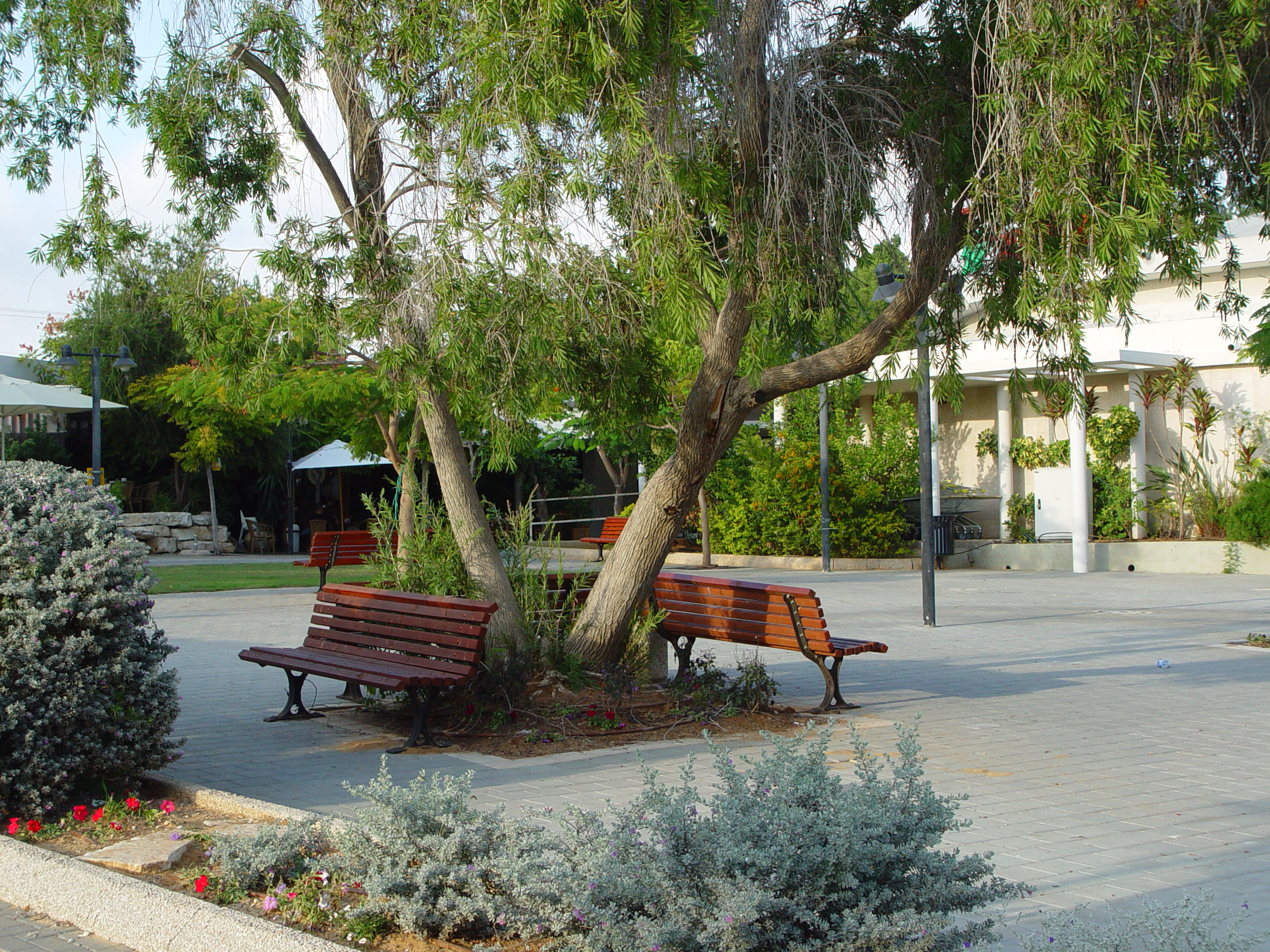
- Interactive map of Tzahala

Area
  - Total: 0.557 km^{2} (0.215 sq mi)

Population
  - Total: 2,120 (2012)

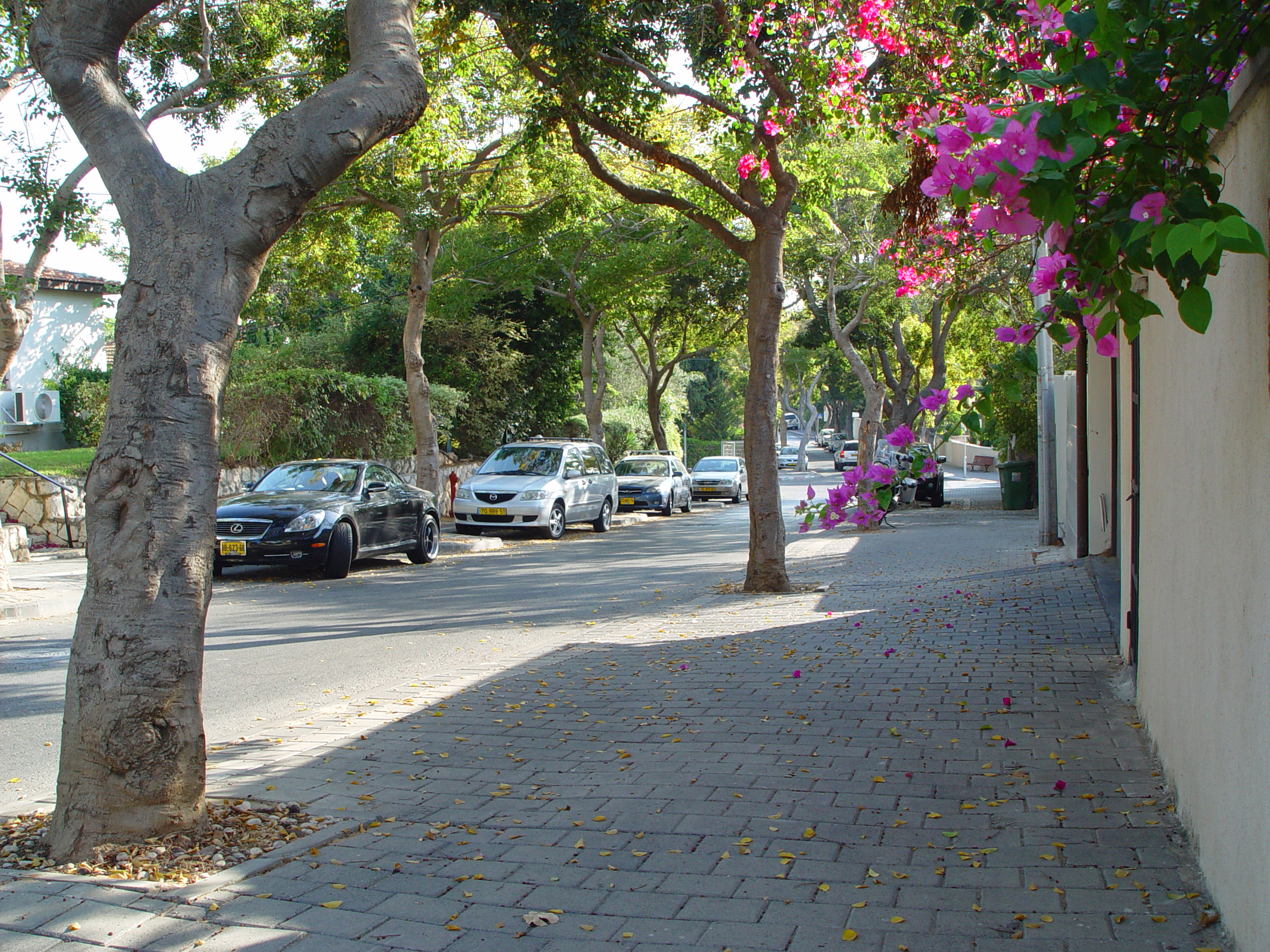
Street in Tzahala

Tzahala (Hebrew: צהלה) is an upmarket residential neighborhood of Tel Aviv, Israel. It is located in the northeastern part of the city. The neighborhood was established in 1951, and is named after the Israel Defense Forces (IDF). It was established to house IDF officers and veterans of the 1948 War. It is known for having a unique security system in that there are no security checks or fences surrounding it. Instead, the security is "based on a combination of a profiling-identification technique" to tell the difference between locals and strangers which relies on "an intensive cooperation from the local residents."

In 2015, the neighborhood was the second wealthiest in Israel. The neighborhood is organized as a cooperative society for housing.

Isaac Herzog grew up and lives in the neighborhood.

The most noticeable villa in the neighborhood is the modernist Orange House, built by the Ginzburg family.
