= Ramat Aviv Gimel =

Residential neighborhood in northwest Tel Aviv, Israel

Coordinates: 32°7′30.91″N 34°47′56.94″E

Ramat Aviv Gimel רמת אביב ג
- Neighborhood of Tel Aviv
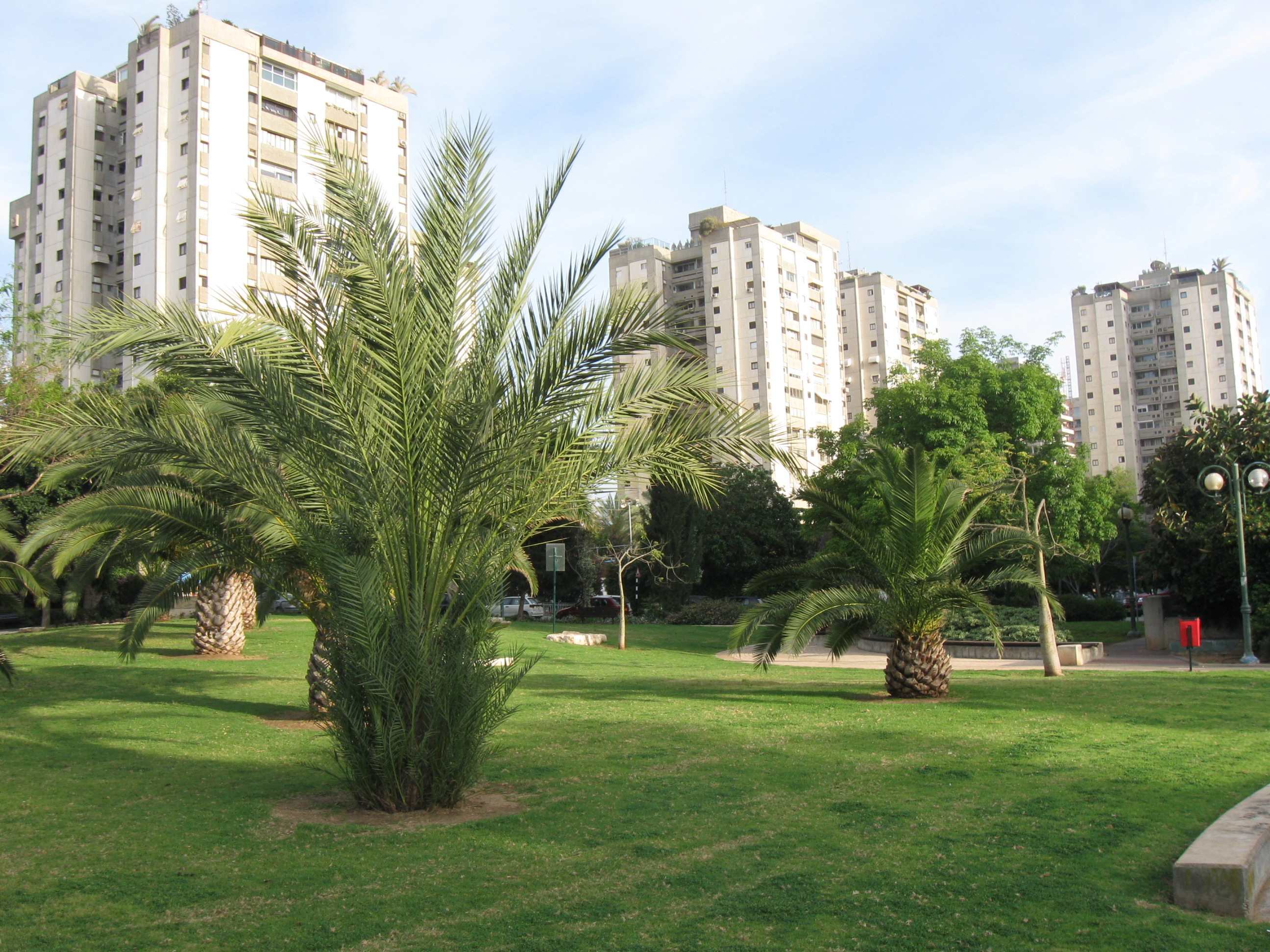
- Interactive map of Ramat Aviv Gimel
- Country: Israel
- City: Tel Aviv
- Established: 1970s

Ramat Aviv Gimel (Hebrew: רמת אביב ג') is a residential neighborhood in northwest Tel Aviv, Israel.

== History ==
Ramat Aviv Gimel is an affluent neighborhood with higher than average real estate prices. The neighborhood was planned and built in the 1970s.

== Cultural references ==
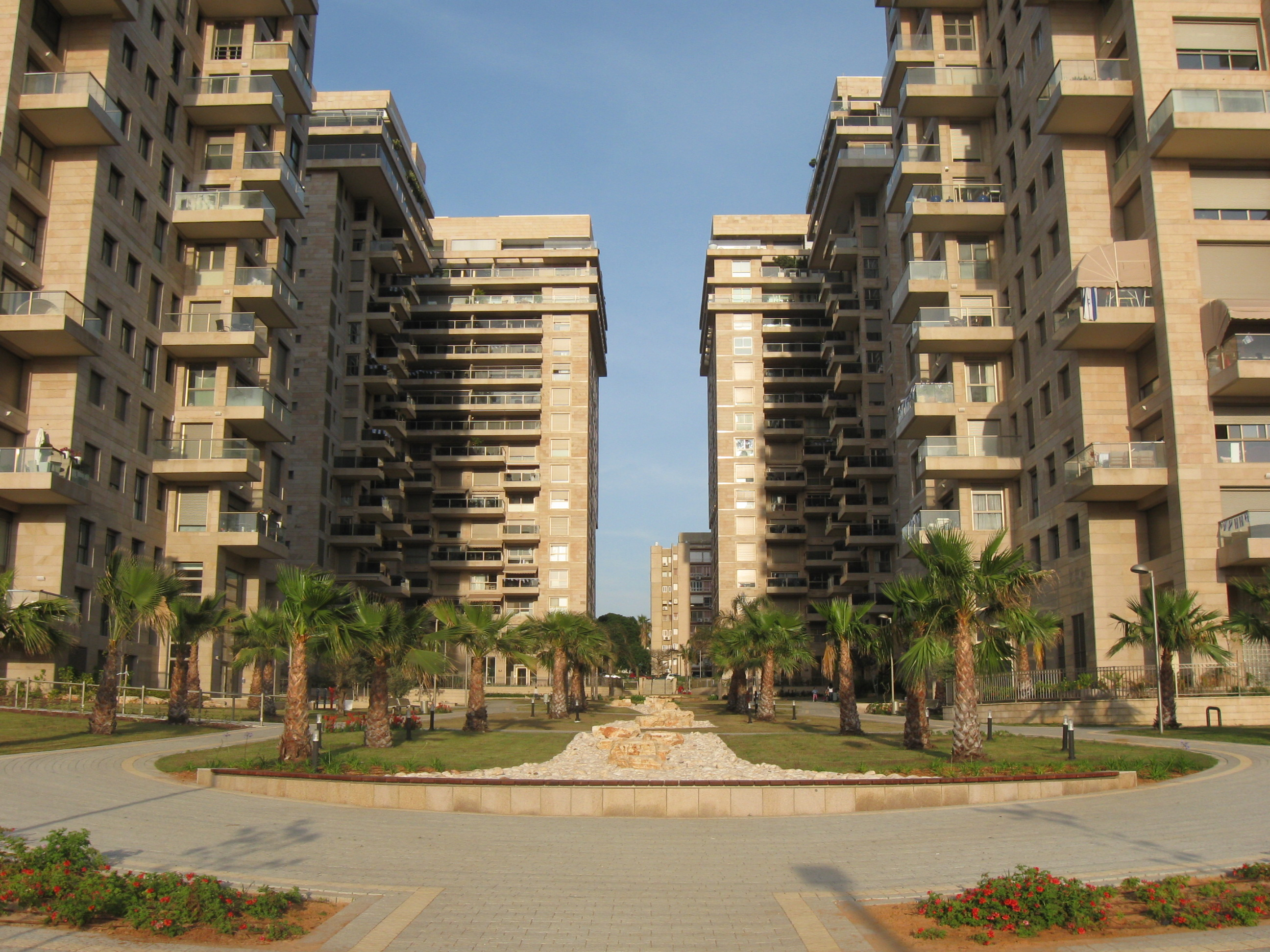
Towers in Ramat Aviv Gimel

- Ramat Aviv Gimel was a soap opera on Israeli TV in the late 1990s.
- A luxury residential complex in Kyiv, Ukraine is modelled after Ramat Aviv Gimel.

== Notable residents ==
- Lihi Lapid
- Yair Lapid
- Daniella Pick
- Quentin Tarantino

== See also ==
- History of Tel Aviv
