= Neve Avivim =

Neighborhood in Tel-Aviv

- Neighborhood of Tel Aviv
- Interactive map of Neve Avivim
- Coordinates: 32.117711°N 34.797972°E
- Country: Israel
- City: Tel Aviv
- Quarter: 1st Quarter of Tel Aviv

Area
  - Total: 0.776 km^{2} (0.300 sq mi)

Population (2012)
  - Total: 12,560
  - Density: 16,200/km^{2} (41,900/sq mi)

Median Age
  - Total: 38
  - Male: 36
  - Female: 40

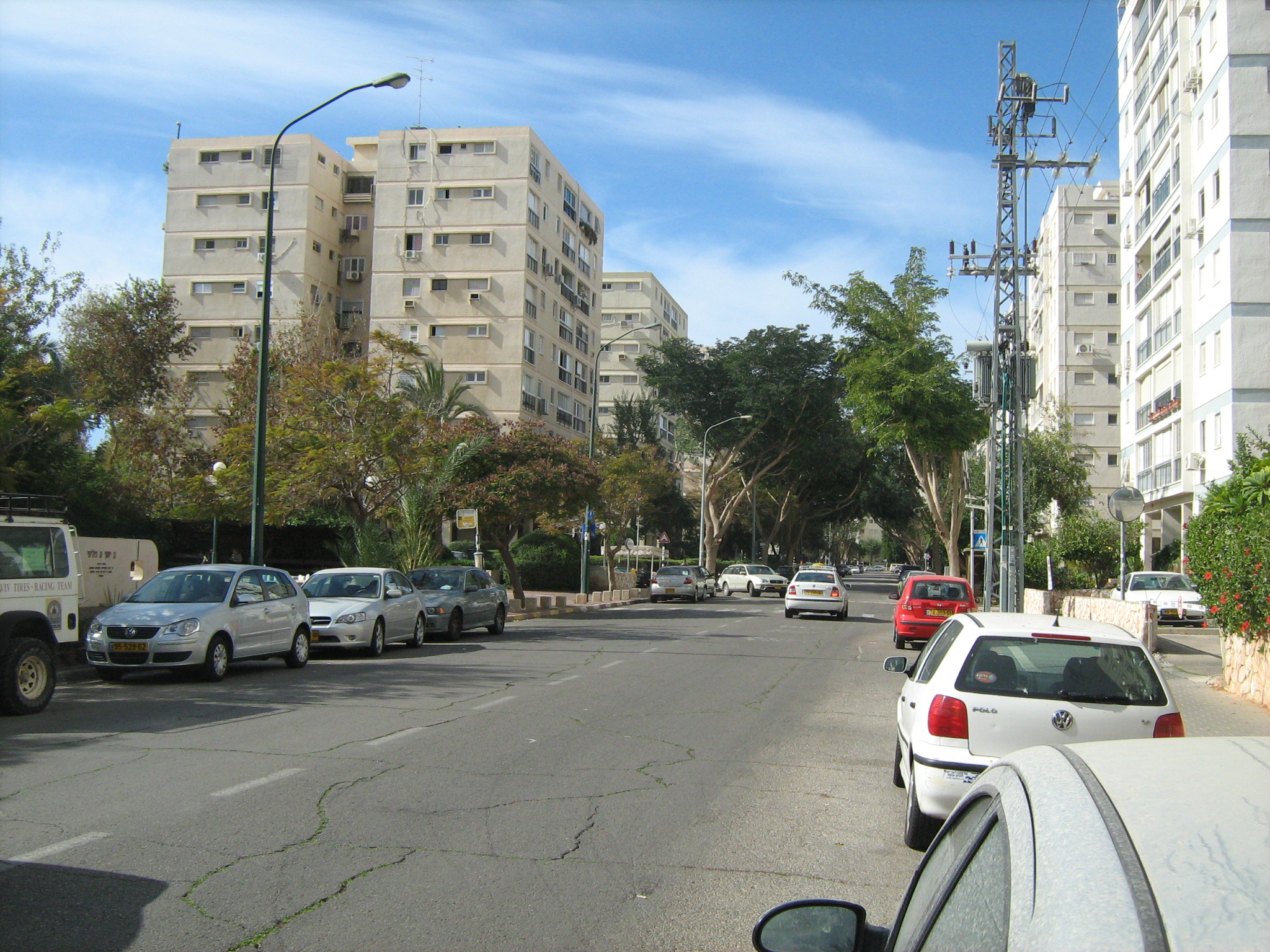
Houses in Neve Avivim

Neve Avivim (Hebrew: נווה אביבים) is a residential neighborhood of Tel Aviv, Israel. It is located in the northwestern part of the city.

== History ==
Neve Avivim was founded in the 1960s, and nearly half of the existing structures were built in this decade. Neve Avivim is home to the Israel Chess Federation.

== Notable residents ==
- Yakir Aharonov
- Shimon Peres
- Itzhak Rabin
- Dalia Rabin-Pelossof
- Itamar Rabinovich
- Zvi Sherf

== See also ==
- History of Tel Aviv
