= Kiryat Atidim =

High tech district of Tel Aviv, Israel

Coordinates: 32°6′53.23″N 34°50′36″E

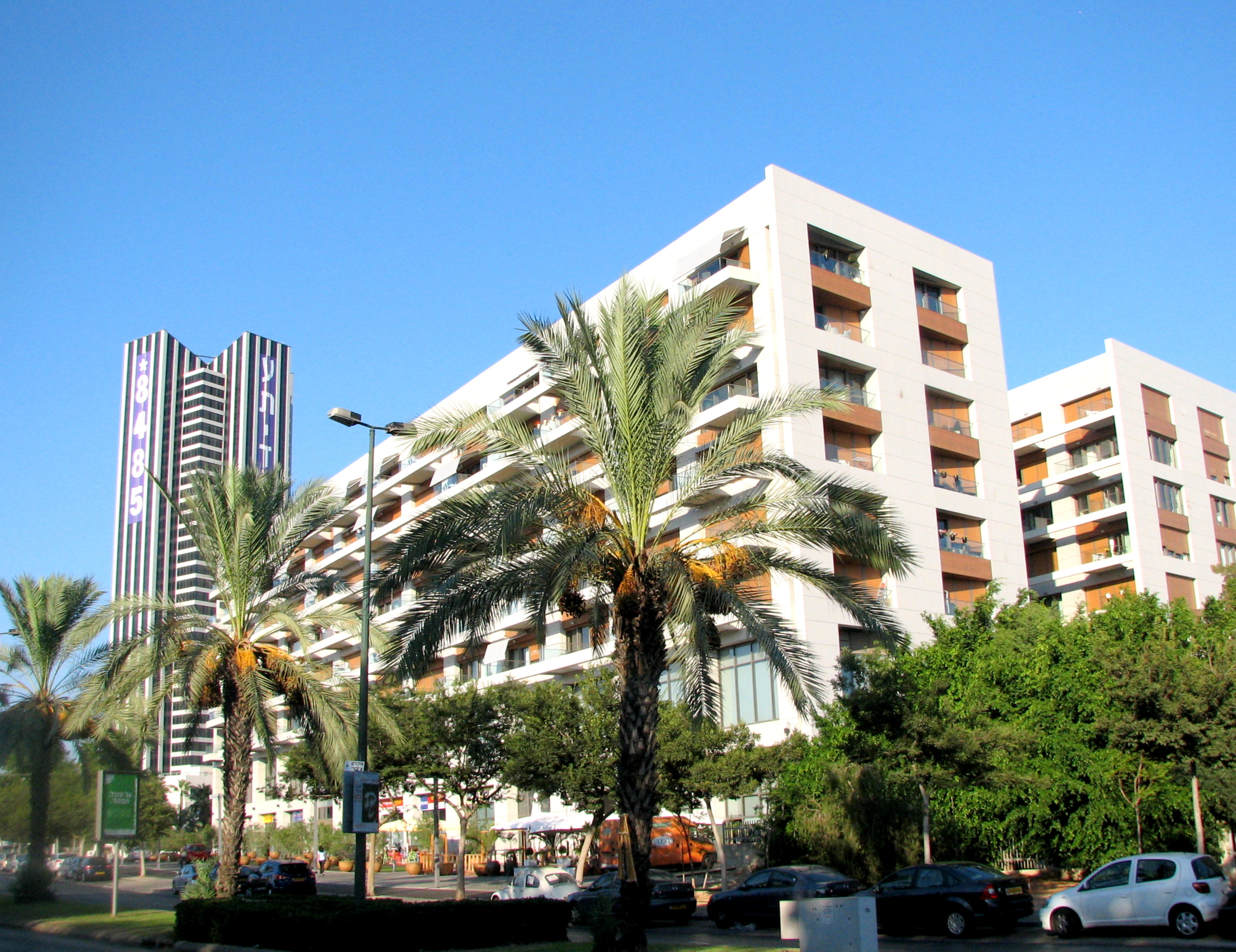
Kiryat Atidim

Kiryat Atidim (Hebrew: קרית עתידים) is a high tech district of Tel Aviv, Israel.

== History ==
Kiryat Atidim is located in North East of Tel Aviv near the Petah Tikva industrial zone. The zone was opened in 1972 as a project of Tel Aviv University and Tel Aviv City Hall. Tel Aviv City Hall, led at the time by Yehoshua Rabinovich, provided the founding company, Atidim, with 85 dunams (85,000 m^{2}), to build the district.

== See also ==
- History of Tel Aviv
