= HaYarkon 96 =

- הירקון 96
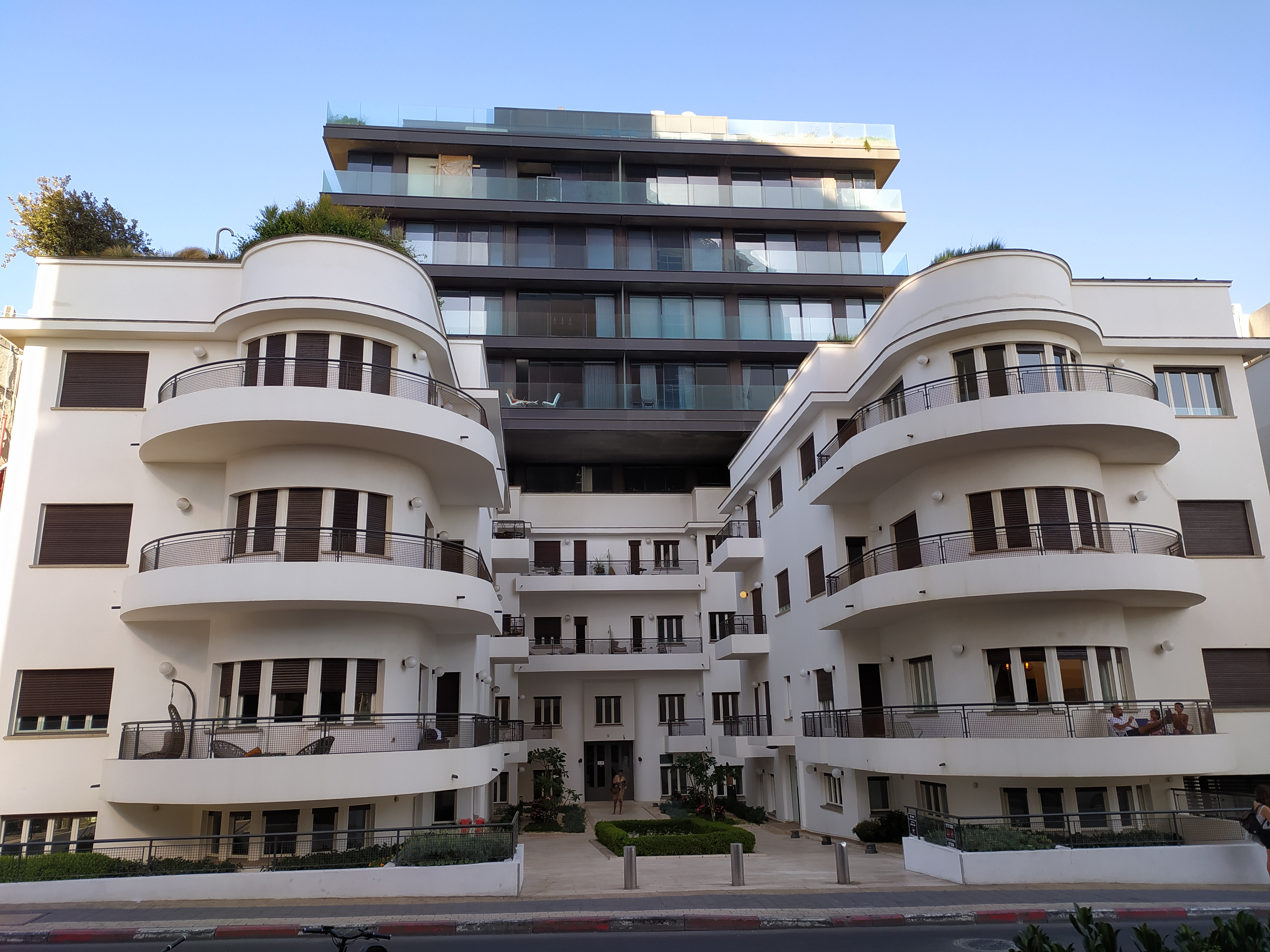
- Interactive map of the HaYarkon 96 area

General information
- Status: Completed
- Type: Apartments
- Location: HaYarkon 96, Tel Aviv, Israel
- Coordinates: 32.078761°N 34.767794°E
- Construction started: 2008 (original building, 1935)
- Opening: 2012
- Owner: Shlomo Grofman and Zalman Shoval

Design and construction
- Architects: Pinchas Bieżoński (1930s), Gidi Bar Orayen
- Other designers: Amnon Bar Or (preservation architect)

Website
- Official website

HaYarkon 96 is a historic International Style building in Tel Aviv, Israel, built in 1935 and reconstructed in 2012. Its penthouse with sea-views, was at one point, considered to be the most expensive property in the country. The building was built by Pinchas Bieżoński, while its reconstruction was led by Shlomo Grofman (former chairman of Africa-Israel) and Zalman Shoval (a former Israeli ambassador).

== History ==
HaYarkon 96 is a historic Bauhaus-influenced International-Style building with a modern extension built in.

The original building was constructed in 1935 by architect Pinchas Bieżoński (1885–1992), shaped like the Hebrew letter "ח" (or an English "n") and surrounding a narrow front courtyard. Zalman Shoval, who was involved in its preservation, lived there with his family from the 1940s through the 1970s.

In 2012, the building was reopened following a careful preservation project. During the preservation, an extension was added, bringing the building's floor count to nine stories. Along with the additional floors, the building has 45 residential units - some with views of the Mediterranean Sea. It is located on HaYarkon Street, a short distance from the Tel Aviv Promenade.

== Gallery ==
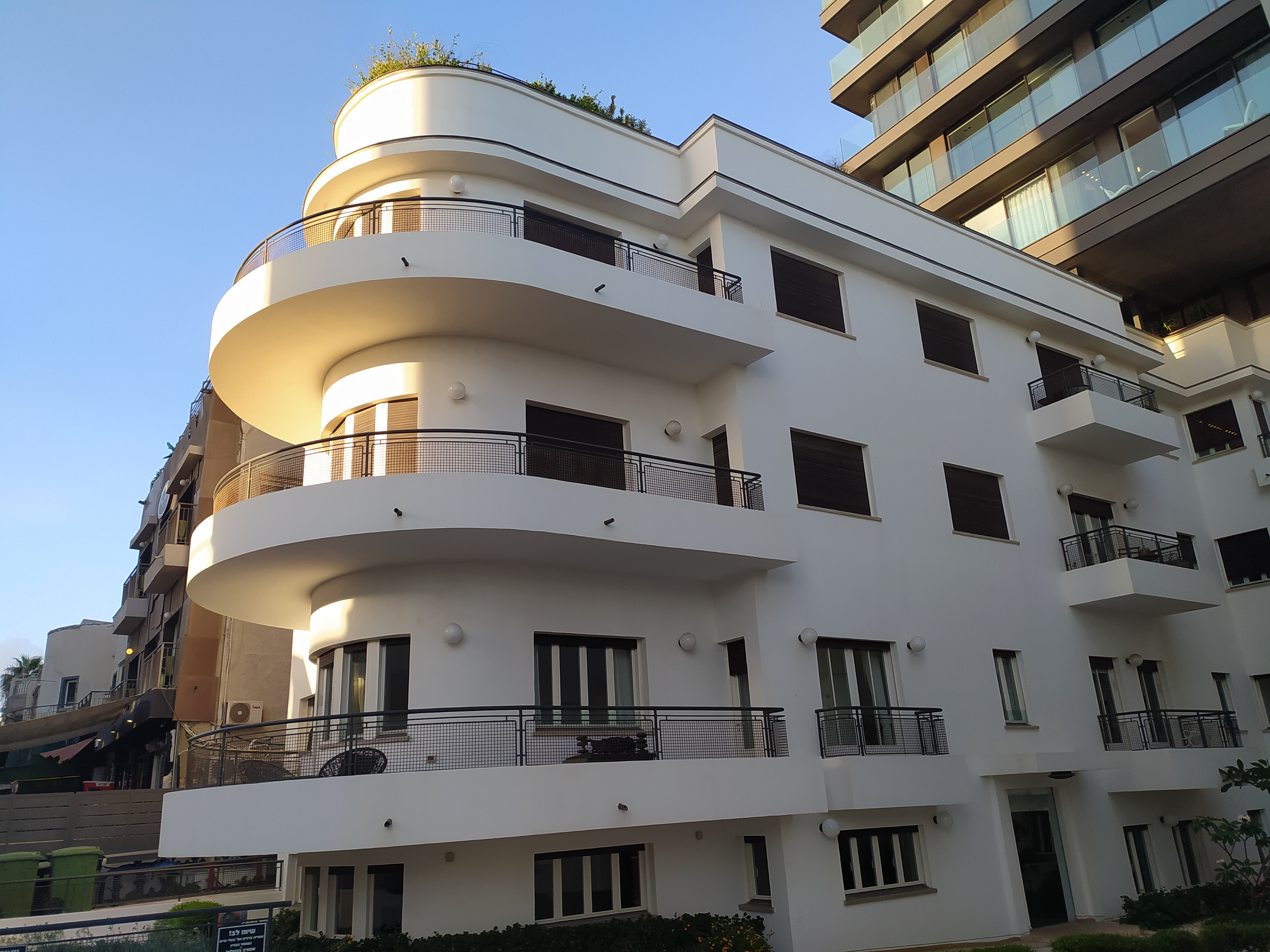
One wing of the HaYarkon 96 building

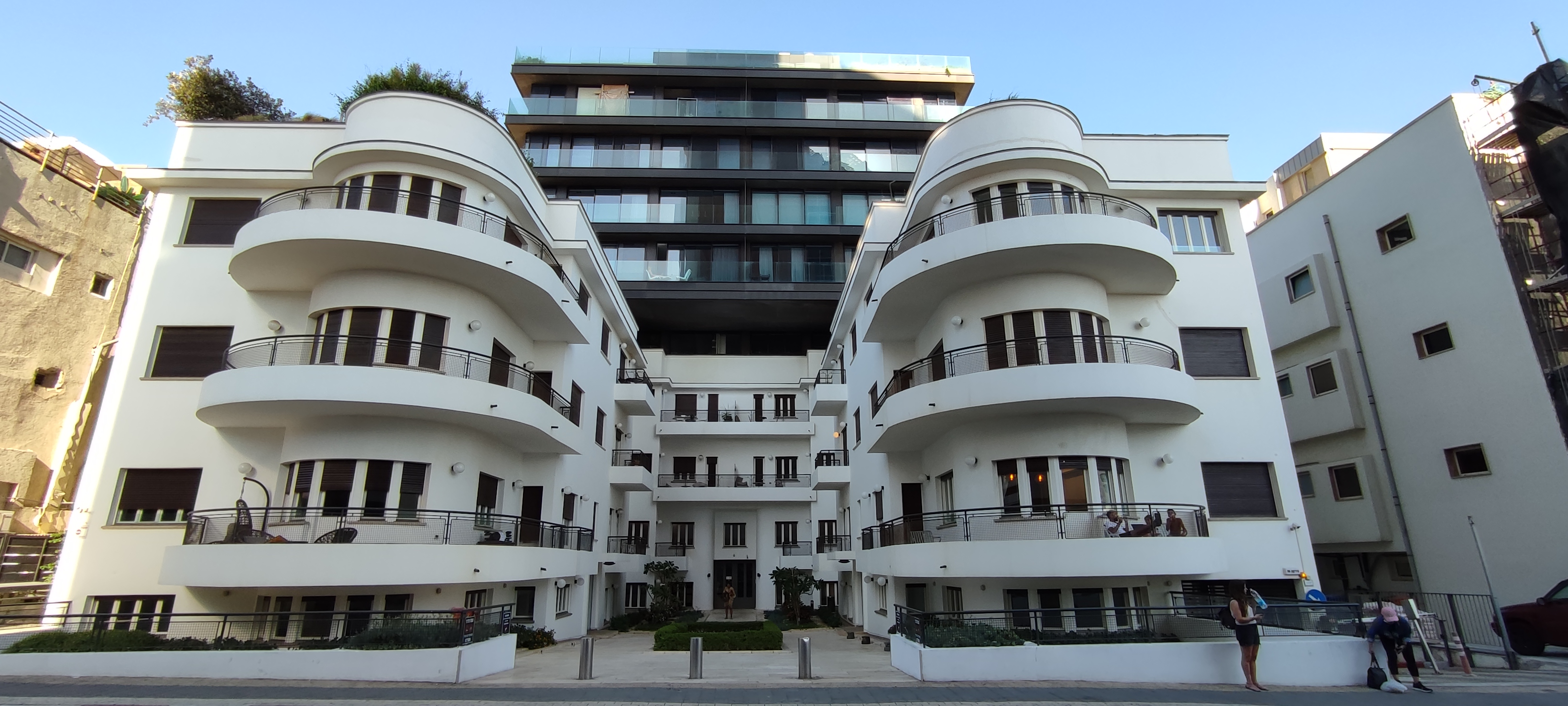
HaYarkon 96
