= Grofman =

Grofman (Hebrew: גרופמן) is a surname. Notable people with the surname include:

- Bernard Grofman, American political scientist
- Shlomo Grofman, Israeli businessman
