= HaYarkon Street =

Street in Tel Aviv, Israel

Coordinates: 32.084011°N 34.769298°E

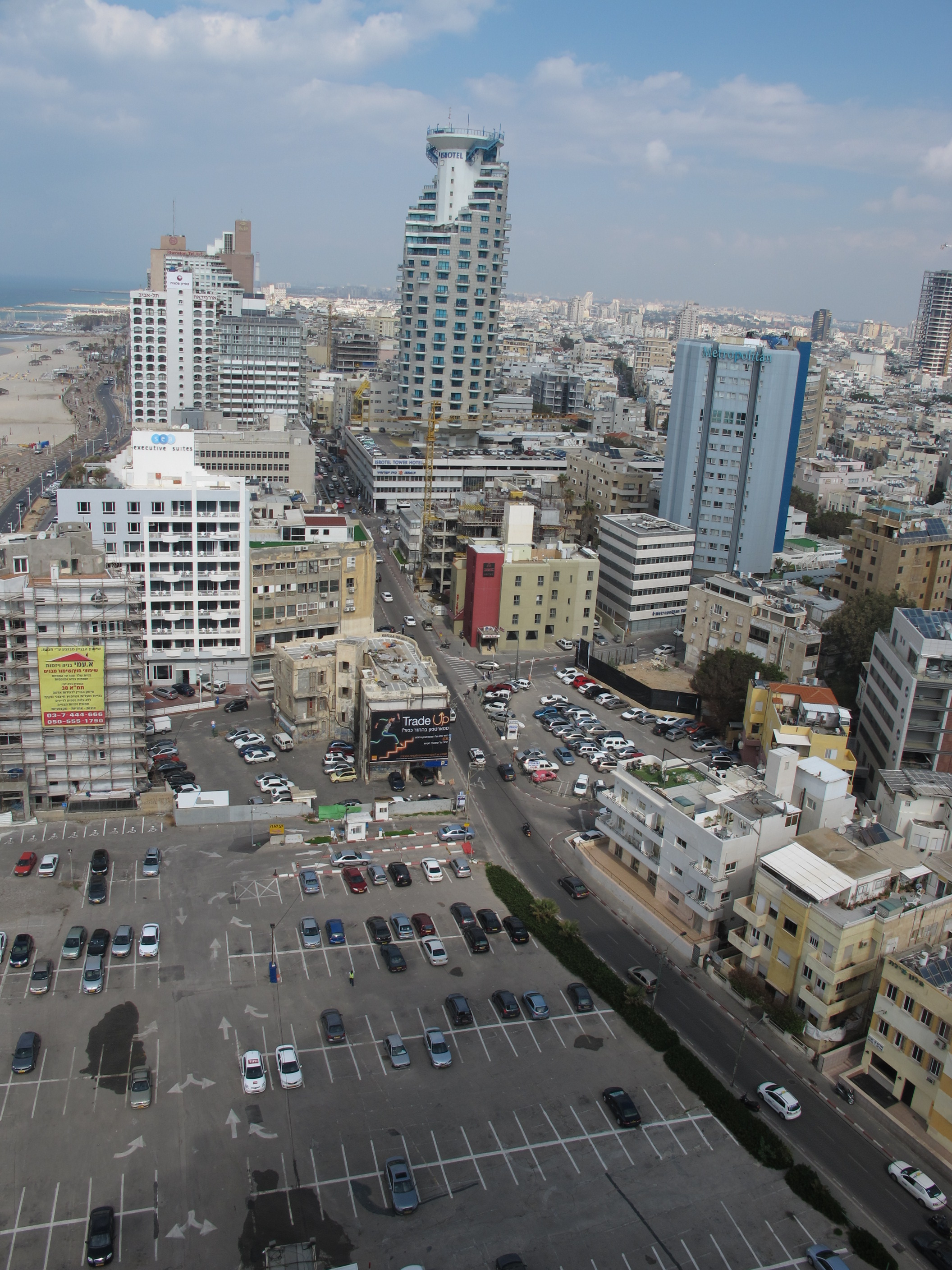
View of HaYarkon Street from Opera Tower

HaYarkon Street is a major street which runs roughly parallel with the coastline in Tel Aviv, Israel, carrying traffic north and south.

The Opera Tower on HaYarkon Street replaces a building from 1945 that housed the Kessem Cinema. In 1948, it became the home of Israel's First Knesset. Sessions were held there until the end of 1949, when the parliament moved to Jerusalem.

The HaYarkon Street has several examples of Bauhaus, or International Style architecture. One of the important examples is a building by HaYarkon 96, built in 1935 and reconstructed in 2012.

The Embassy of the United States was located on HaYarkon Street before its move to Jerusalem in May 2018. It continues to operate as a branch office.

Other notable sites (selection):

- Dan Hotel, Tel Aviv
- New Sheraton Tel Aviv Hotel
- Cinema Paris (one of the oldest cinemas in the city)
- The "Crazy House" at No. 181 (1985, by French architect Léon Gaignebet), considered an "architectural curiosity" and inspired by the Paris Métro's 1900 Art Nouveau style
- The Embassy of the United Kingdom
- The Embassy of Russia
- Isrotel Tower
- London Square, a public park and town square
- HaGra Synagogue, founded in 1934 by Rabbi Yosef Zvi HaLevy
- The Levant Fair complex
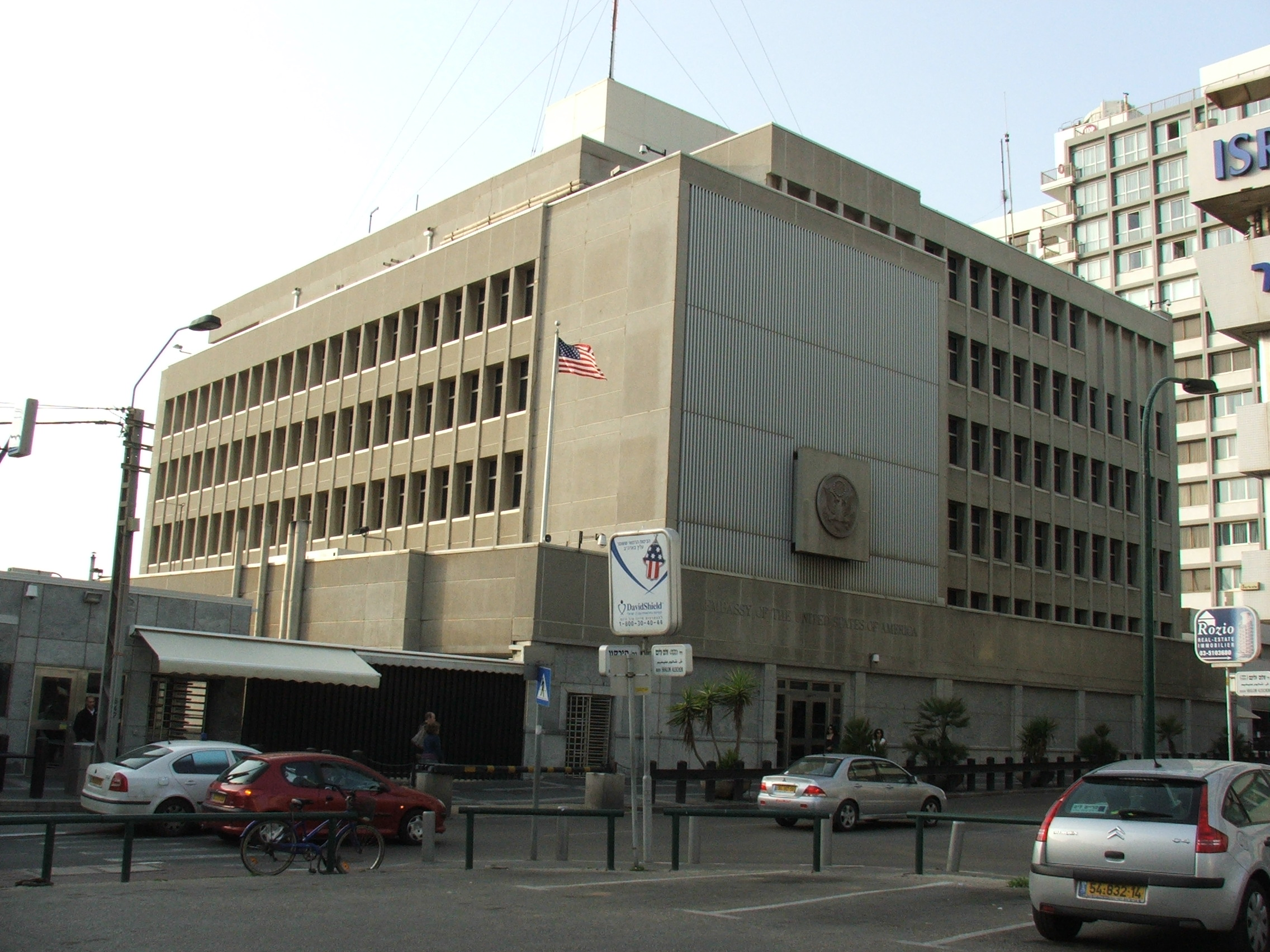
Branch office of the US embassy

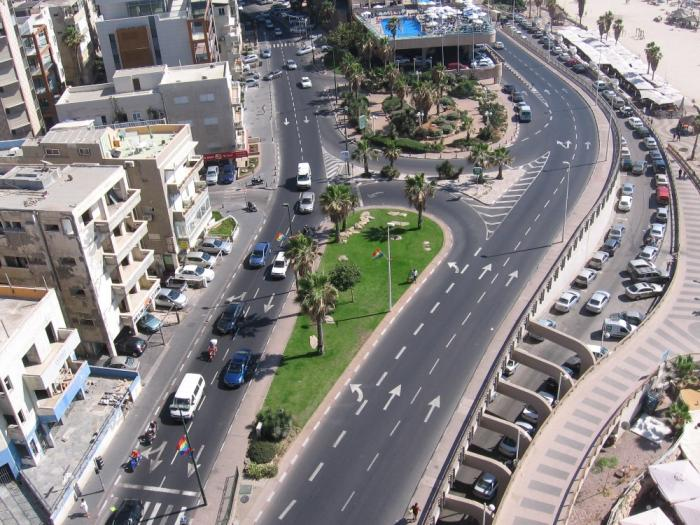
Meeting point between Hayarkon Street (left) and Herbert Samuel Street (right)

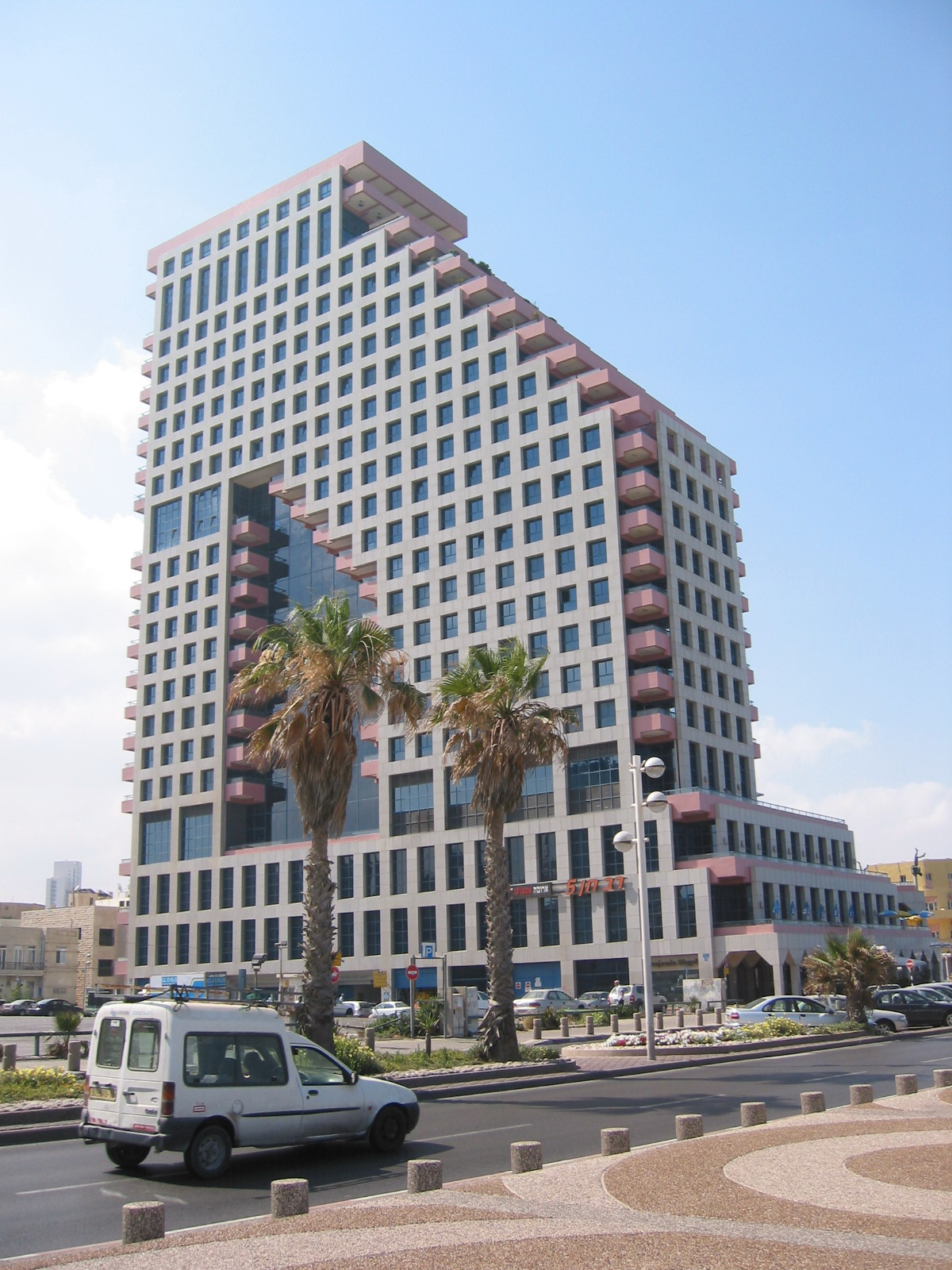
Opera Tower

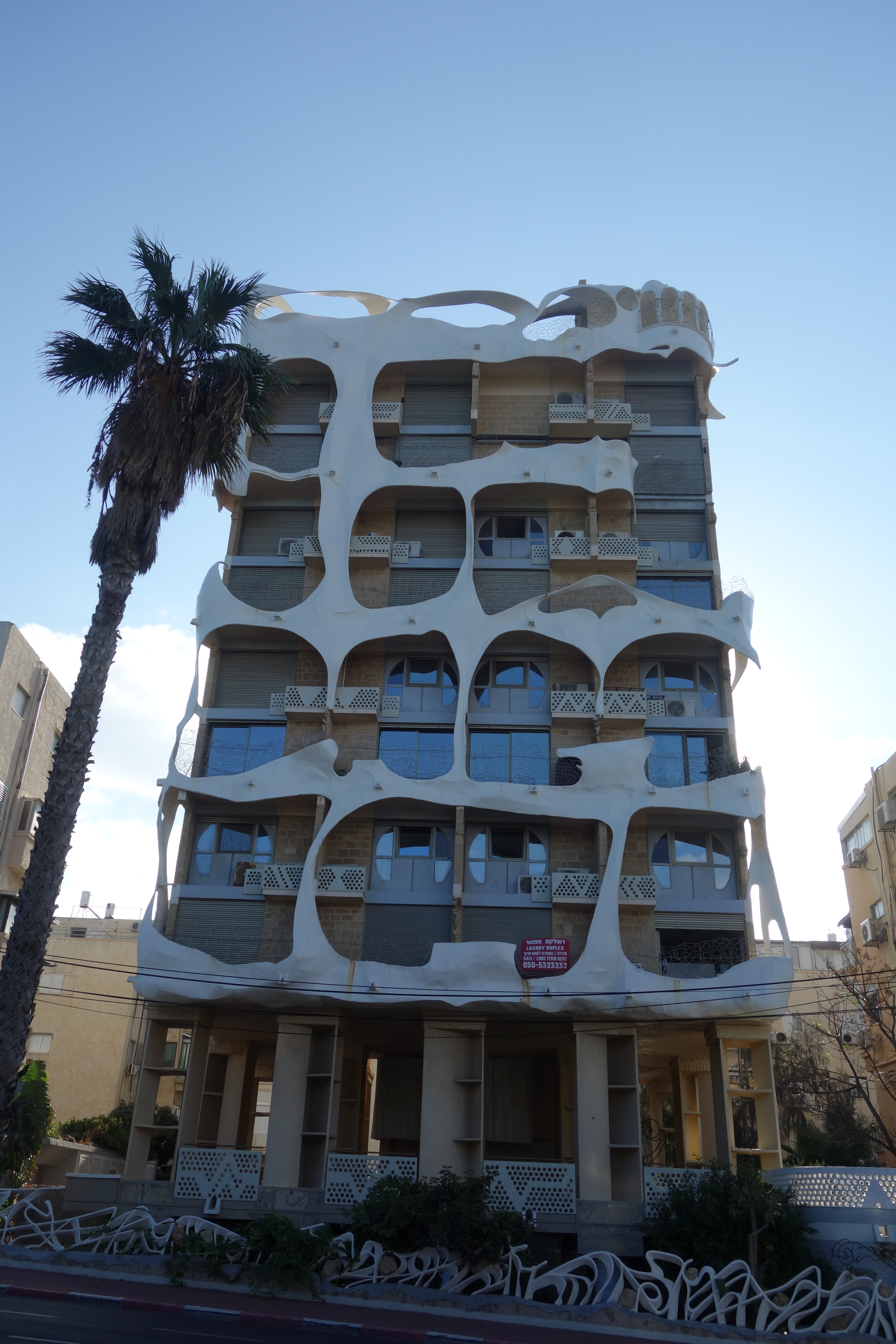
"Crazy House"

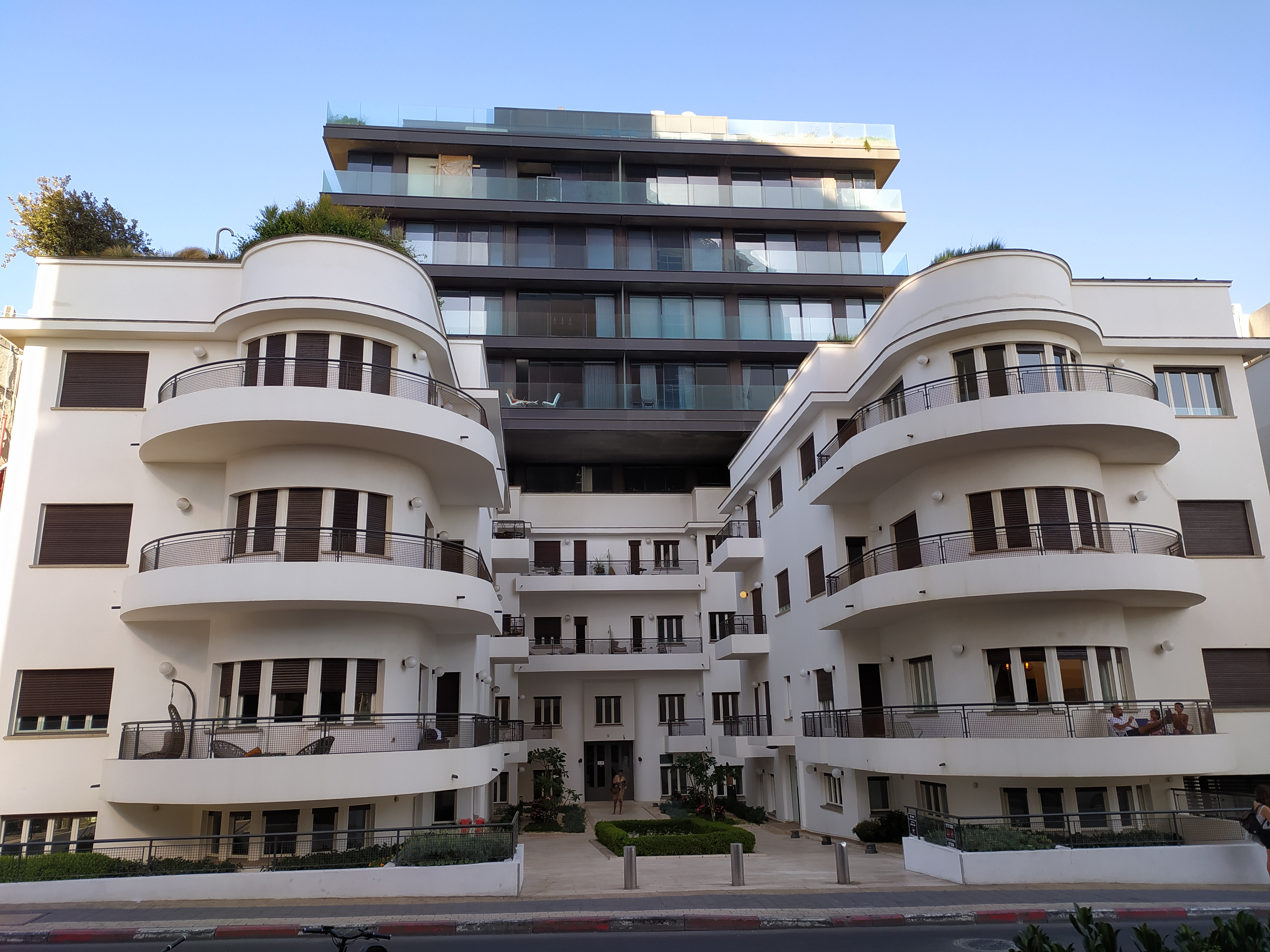
HaYarkon 96

== See also ==
- Culture of Israel
- Architecture of Israel
