= Tel Aviv Branch Office of the Embassy of the United States =

Tel Aviv Branch Office of the US Embassy
- סניף תל אביב של שגרירות ארצות הברית (Hebrew)
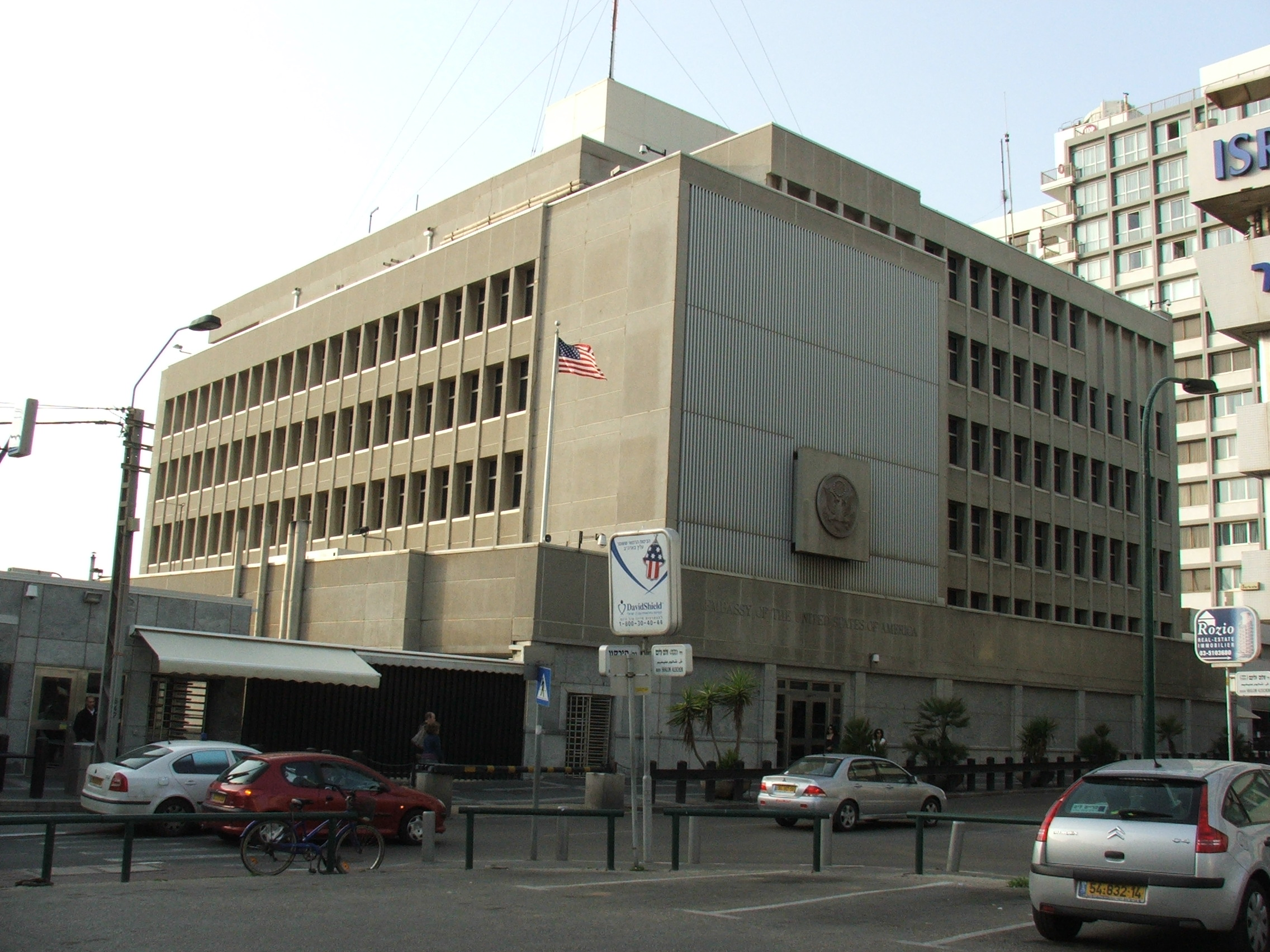
- Chancery Building as viewed from the street

- Location within Israel
- 32.0766°N 34.7667°E
- Location: 71 Hayarkon Street; Tel Aviv, Israel

The Branch Office of the Embassy of the United States of America in Tel Aviv is part of the diplomatic mission of the United States in the State of Israel. The complex opened in 1966, and is located at 71 HaYarkon Street in Tel Aviv. It served as the United States Embassy until May 14, 2018, when the seat of embassy was relocated to Jerusalem.

In December 2017, President Donald Trump recognized Jerusalem as the capital of Israel and ordered that the US Embassy be moved there. The US Embassy in Israel relocated to Arnona, the site of the consular section of the US Consulate General on May 14, 2018. A space was carved out in that building for office space for the Ambassador and a small staff. This move coincided with the 70th anniversary of the Israeli Declaration of Independence.

== History ==
The United States was the first country to recognize the newly founded state of Israel on 14 May 1948, immediately following Israel's proclamation of independence. U.S. President Harry S. Truman subsequently announced that there would be an exchange of missions:

Agreement has been reached between the Government of the United States and the Provisional Government of Israel on the establishment of a mission of the United States in Israel and a mission of the Provisional Government of Israel in the United States. Agreement has also been reached on the exchange of special representatives.

On 22 June, Clark Clifford, President Truman's aide, called James G. McDonald telling him that the President wanted McDonald to be the United States' first representative to Israel. During his ambassadorship, McDonald helped strengthen relations between the two governments. For example, in 1950, the United States and Israel entered into an "Aviation Agreement" that allowed Trans World Airlines (TWA) to operate fully out of Israel and El Al to send regular flights to the United States. Ambassador McDonald hoped the signing of the first formal agreement between the two governments would be the first in a series of similar agreements that would gradually bind the two countries and peoples closer together in creative co-operative work.

For many years, there was controversy surrounding the Tel Aviv location of the United States embassy because Israel has identified Jerusalem as its capital while the United States had not recognised Jerusalem as Israel's capital. In late 2017, however, United States President Donald Trump recognized Jerusalem as the capital, subject to further definition, and announced the intention to relocate the United States embassy, which occurred on May 14, 2018.

Walworth Barbour served as Ambassador of the United States to Israel from 1961 to 1973, which is when the Embassy re-located to its present location of 71 Hayarkon Street. He assumed his post already very familiar with the Middle East and South Eastern Europe but with "no particular interest in Israel one way or another." Nevertheless, Barbour was Ambassador to Israel for 12 years, and when asked why he stayed so long he answered, "I like it." The American International School in Even Yehuda, Israel is named after him.

Before the embassy moved to Jerusalem in 2018, the embassy in Tel Aviv was one of the few American embassies not located in the national capital (others included the Embassy of the United States, The Hague and the Embassy of the United States, Attard). Congressman Tom Lantos and Senator Daniel Patrick Moynihan contrasted this with the fact that, during the Cold War, the American Embassy to East Germany was located in its de facto capital of East Berlin, even though the United States never recognized that city as the capital.

== Organization ==
The U.S. Embassy Branch Office in Tel Aviv maintains and promotes diplomatic and people-to-people relations between the United States and Israel. The Branch Office has as a large staff of officers and specialists who are responsible for all aspects of economic, political, commercial, military, media, educational, cultural, and humanitarian relations. Tel Aviv operates one of the State Department's busiest Non-Immigrant Visa sections, which produces the highest volume of nonimmigrant visas in the Middle East. The US Citizens Services Unit is the State Department's third largest ACS office overseas, and the volume of U.S. passports issued makes Tel Aviv the second largest passport operation in the world.

There is also an American Consular Agent in Haifa.

=== Press and Cultural Affairs at the U.S. Embassy Branch Office in Tel Aviv ===
The Office of Press and Cultural Affairs is responsible for Branch Office communication through its public website and popular social media platforms. The office maintains a Facebook page, a YouTube page, and a Flickr page (see External links). It is also responsible for all communication with media organizations in Israel. The office invites Israelis to participate in professional visits to the United States, conducts exchange programs, showcases American culture through visits of visual and performing artists, and invites academics to speak with students, experts and general audiences. The Branch Office reaches thousands of young Israeli Jews and Arabs through English language programs, and provides grants to many non-government organizations involved in co-existence activities.

==== The American Center in Jerusalem ====
A public-access American Center in Jerusalem was established in 1968. The staff of the American Center design and oversee educational seminars, exchanges, performances, and grant programs in a wide variety of areas, including cultural diplomacy, sports diplomacy, legal issues, diversity, coexistence, women's issues, human rights, religious tolerance, and English instruction. These activities take place at the Center itself or at partner institutions. The American Center also operates an Information Resource Center, which is open to the public and offers 6,000 reference and circulating books, 1,000 DVDs, 80 periodicals and journals, and access to news and scholarly databases.

==== Middle East Partnership Initiative ====
The Middle East Partnership Initiative (MEPI) is a U.S. State Department program that supports political and economic reform efforts in the Middle East and North Africa. Run out of the Public Diplomacy office of the Embassy Branch Office in Tel Aviv.

==== The Fulbright Commission for Israel ====
The United States-Israel Educational Foundation (USIEF) was established by the governments of the United States and Israel in 1956 and given responsibility for the administration of Israel's participation in the Fulbright program. The Ambassador of the United States serves as Honorary Chair of the 8-member USIEF Board. The primary activity of the Fulbright commission for Israel is to strengthen mutual understanding between the people of the United States and the people of Israel through academic and professional exchanges. In 2011, a total of 73 Fulbright Israel Fellowships were awarded, 40 to Israeli citizens and 33 to American citizens.

The United States-Israel Educational Foundation also operates an EducationUSA Counseling Center which distributes information on post-secondary educational opportunities in the United States. The Counseling Center assists interested candidates in the selection of suitable programs and offers advice in the preparation of application files. The Center provides both group information sessions and individual counseling.

=== United States Commercial Service in Israel ===
The United States Commercial Service (USCS) is the trade promotion arm of the U.S. Department of Commerce International Trade Administration. Located within the Embassy Branch Office in Tel Aviv, the Commercial Service assists hundreds of Americans each year to learn about opportunities in Israel's economy and to expand their sales in the Israeli market. The Commercial Service also works with individual American States to attract Israeli investment. The goal of the Commercial Service is to broaden and deepen the U.S. exporter base, remove export obstacles for small and medium-sized companies in the United States, advance U.S. business interests abroad, and support job creation in Israel and the United States.

=== U.S. Agency for International Development in Israel ===
The United States Agency for International Development (USAID) is the principal U.S. assistance agency that extends help to countries recovering from disaster, trying to escape poverty, and engaging in democratic reforms. Although USAID is separate from the State Department, both report to the United States Secretary of State. Since 1994, USAID has worked in the West Bank and Gaza providing more than $3.4 billion in U.S. economic assistance to Palestinians in the areas of water and sanitation, infrastructure, education, health, economic growth, and democracy. USAID also provides assistance for basic human needs in both the West Bank and Gaza, including emergency food, health care, and access to safe water.

=== U.S. Immigration and Customs Enforcement in Israel ===
U.S. Immigration and Customs Enforcement (ICE) has a Homeland Security Investigations (HSI) Office located within the U.S. Embassy Branch Office Tel Aviv. As the largest investigative arm of the United States Department of Homeland Security (DHS), HSI enhances U.S. national security by conducting international law enforcement operations. The HSI Office in Tel Aviv partners with their Israeli counterparts to combat criminal organizations and prevent terrorist activities. They are charged with enforcing a wide array of laws, including those related to financial crime, trade fraud, and narcotics and cash smuggling. Aside from Tel Aviv, HSI works with 69 offices in 47 countries around the world.

=== Federal Bureau of Investigation in Israel ===
For nearly seven decades, the FBI has stationed special agents and other personnel overseas to help protect Americans back home by building relationships with principal law enforcement, intelligence, and security services around the globe that help ensure a prompt and continuous exchange of information. The FBI Legal Attaché in Israel works with the Israeli law enforcement and security agencies to coordinate investigations of interest to both countries.

=== U.S. Defense Attaché Office in Israel ===
U.S. Senior Defense Official/Defense Attaché represents the U.S. Secretary of Defense, the Chairman of the Joint Chiefs of Staff, and the Commander of U.S. Central Command in Israel (European Command prior to 2021). To accomplish this mission U.S. Defense Attaché Office (DAO) personnel advise the U.S. Ambassador to Israel on military matters, implement a variety of bi-lateral military engagement programs, and thoroughly report political-military developments in a timely manner. The USDAO serves as the primary point of contact for all joint U.S.-Israeli military activities and communications on defense matters between the U.S. government and the Government of Israel.

== Jerusalem Embassy Act ==
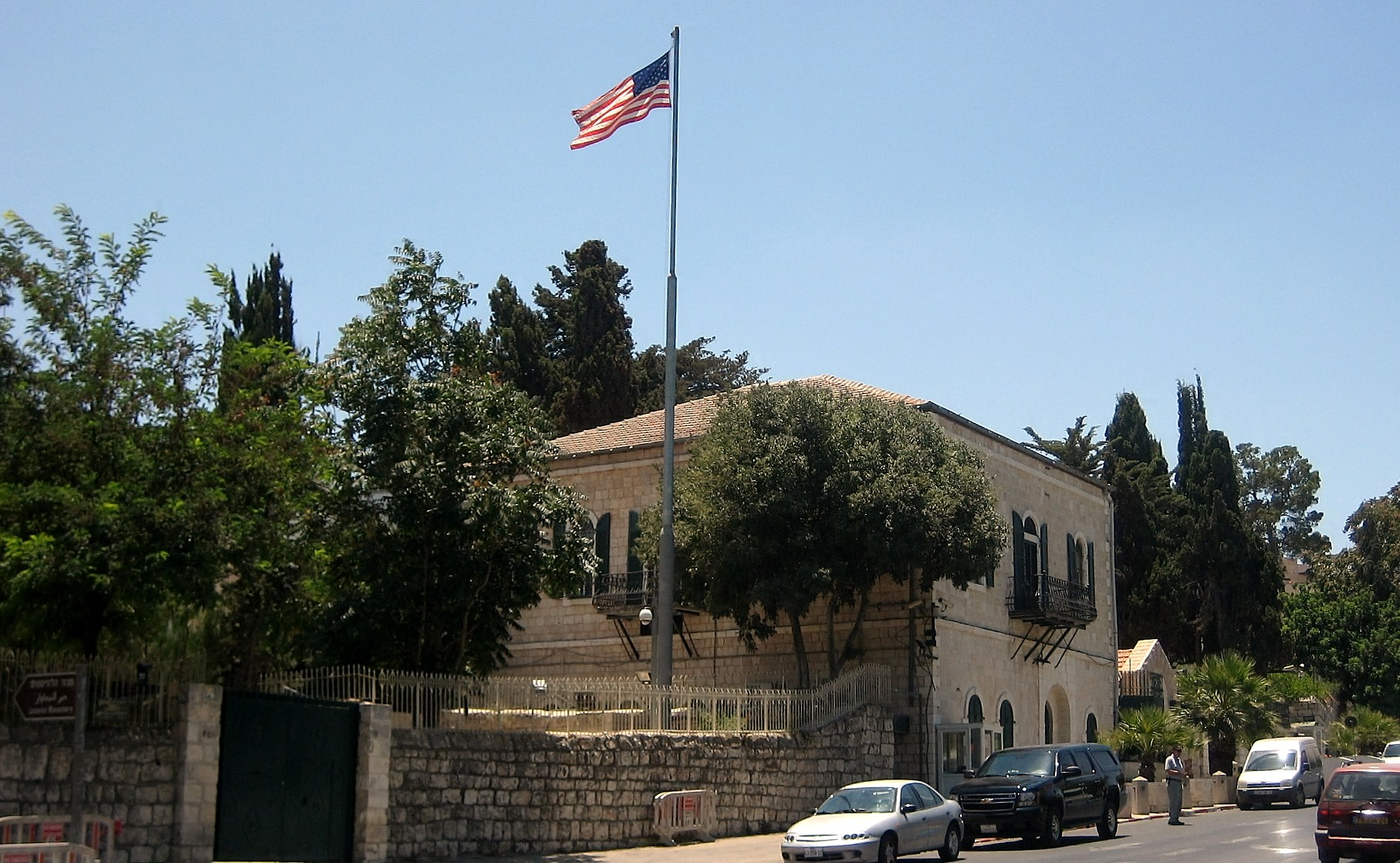
Consulate-General at Agron Street, Jerusalem

The Jerusalem Embassy Act, passed by a bipartisan supermajority of Congress in 1995, required the United States to relocate its embassy in Israel from Tel Aviv to Jerusalem by December 31, 1999, and that Jerusalem be recognized as the capital of Israel. The embassy remained in Tel Aviv because the Act also allowed for the president to "delay the implementation of the law indefinitely if the move presents national security concerns." Presidents Bill Clinton, George W. Bush, and Barack Obama regularly invoked the clause, delaying the move of the embassy to Jerusalem.

On December 6, 2017, President Donald Trump recognized Jerusalem as the capital of Israel subject to further definition as to boundaries and ordered the embassy moved to Jerusalem. The relocation process was originally expected to take around 4 years. On February 23, 2018, it was announced that the US Embassy in Israel would move to the Arnona Consular Section facility of the US Consulate General on May 14, 2018.

Until early March 2019, the United States maintained a separate Consulate General in Jerusalem for conducting relations with Jerusalem, West Bank, and Gaza Strip. The Consulate General dates back to 1844 during the Ottoman period. On October 18, 2018, United States Secretary of State Mike Pompeo announced the merger of the US Embassy and consulate general in Jerusalem into a single diplomatic mission. On March 4, 2019, the US Consulate General ceased operating as an independent mission and was formally integrated into the US Embassy. Its former Agron Street premises will be occupied by a special Palestinian Affairs Unit, which will assume many of its former functions but reports directly to the embassy.

In July 2020, the United States sold the ambassador's residence in Herzliya for more than $67 million to Sheldon Adelson.

== See also ==
- Israel – United States relations
- United States Ambassador to Israel
