= London Square =

Square in Tel Aviv, Israel

Coordinates: 32°04′42″N 34°46′2″E

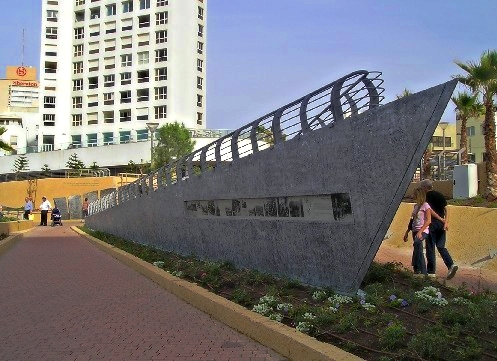
A monument in London Square

London Square (Hebrew: כיכר לונדון, Kikar London) is a public plaza in the center of Tel Aviv, Israel located at the western end of Bograshov Street, between Herbert Samuel Promenade ("The Promenade") and Hayarkon Street.

The square was named in honor of the citizens of London, England who withstood the bombing of the United Kingdom by Nazi Germany during World War II—The Blitz.

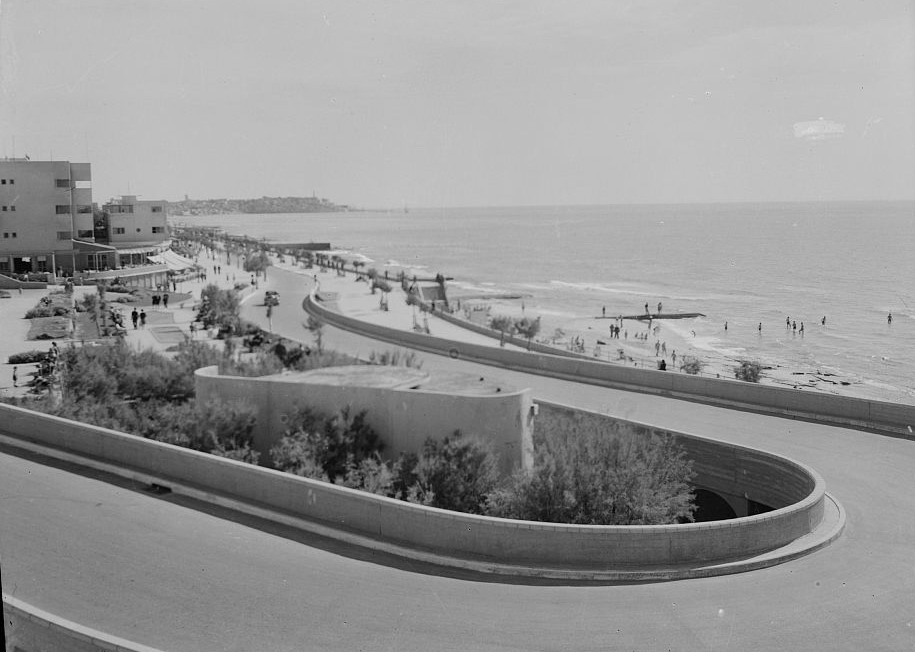
An older photo of London Square

== History ==
The square is named after London, the capital of England and the United Kingdom, and was inaugurated on May 24, 1942. The square was named as a tribute and honor to the resilience of the British people and the residents of London during the heavy bombings by Germany during World War II (The Blitz).

In April 2000, a project began to develop the garden into an urban square, with an underground parking lot containing 500 parking spaces. Additionally, a gas station was built at the entrance to the parking lot and a café on the upper level. The project was completed in July 2003.

== Design ==
The area of the square is about 10 dunams, redesigned by landscape architect Bruce Levin. The square is built on different levels (due to slight elevation differences between Herbert Samuel Promenade along the promenade and Hayarkon Street, which is a few meters higher). At the center of the square stands a monument in the shape of an immigrant ship, commemorating the struggle of the Aliyah Bet against British rule. The monument includes explanations and impressions alongside pictures about the history of the Aliyah Bet, the hardships faced by the immigrants, and their ships. Additionally, six plaques are placed in the square with the names of all the immigrant ships.

In the building with the rounded balcony that borders the square to the south, the Pilz Café was located (as of 2012, it is a McDonald's branch).

== Gallery ==
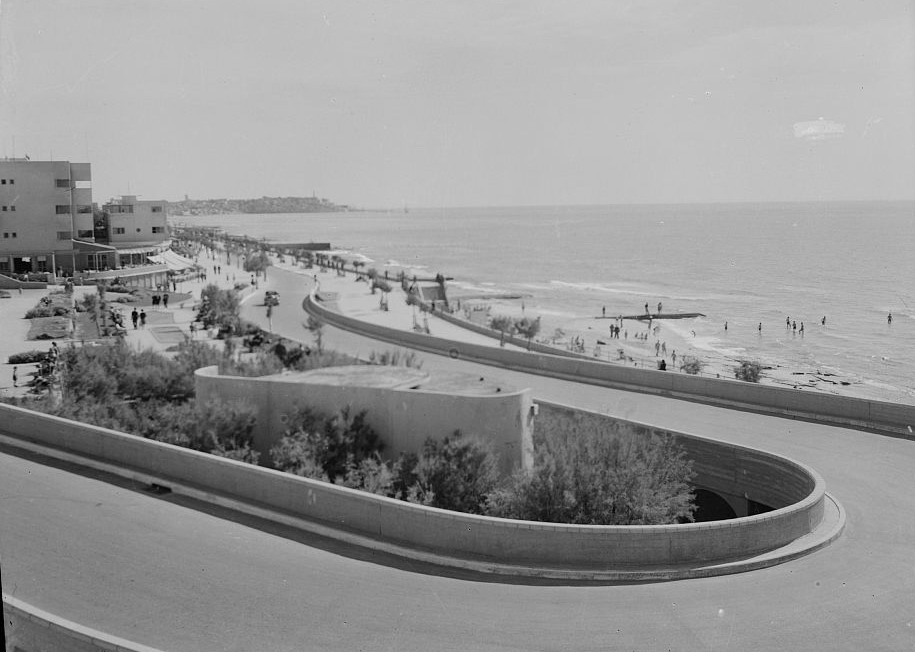
London Square during its establishment, 1941

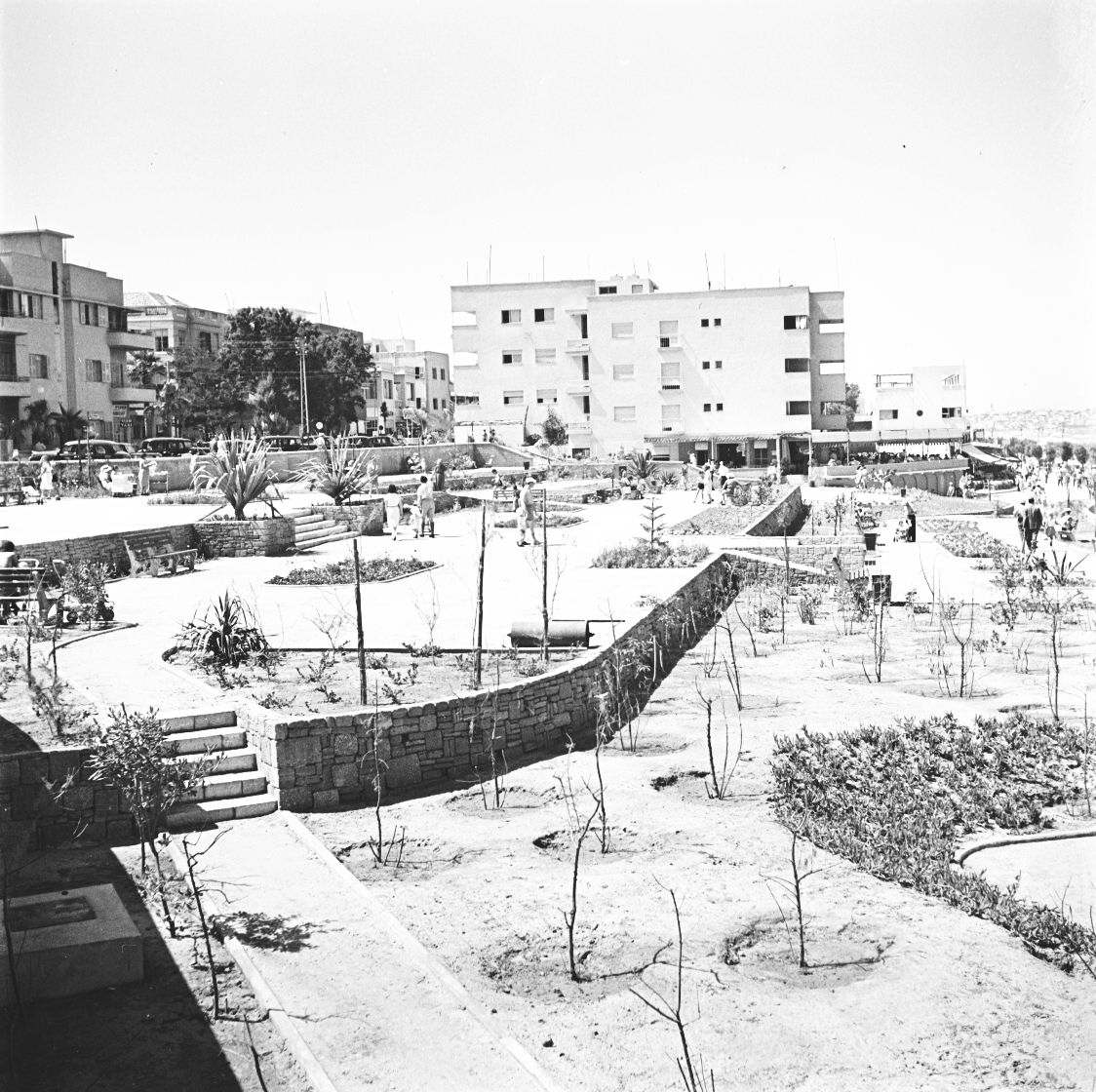
London Square in 1942

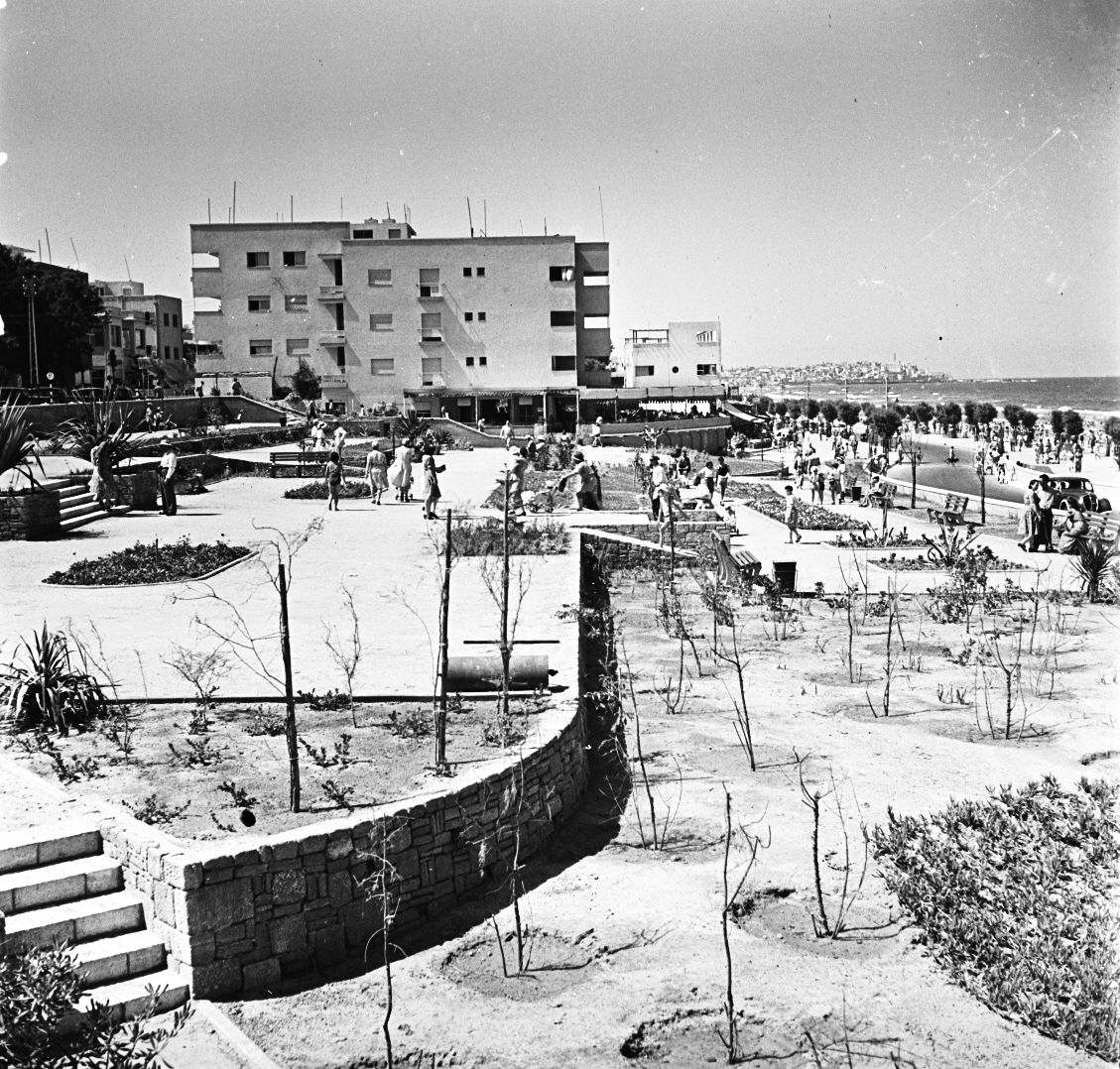
London Square in 1942

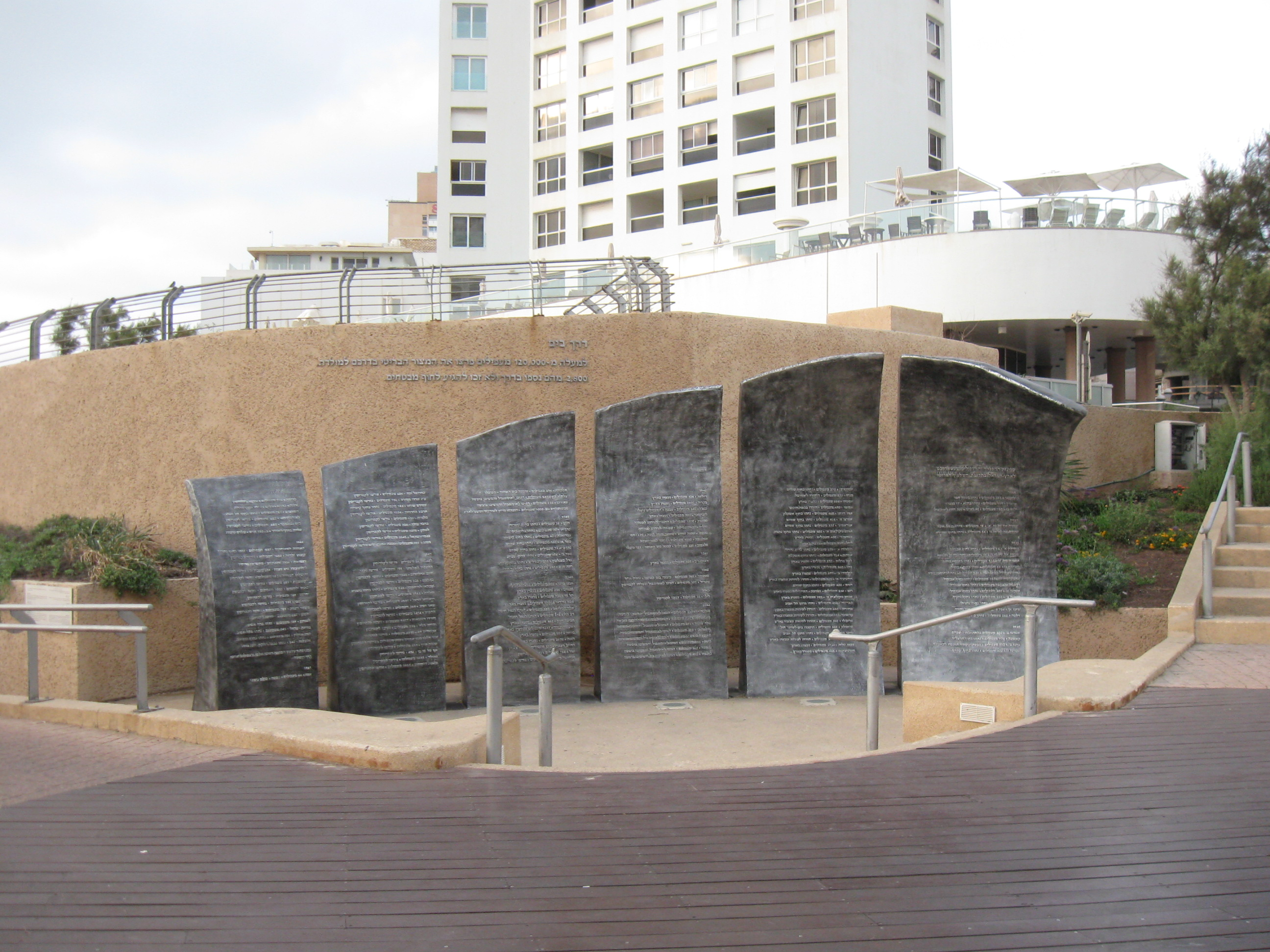
The six plaques with the names of the immigrant ships

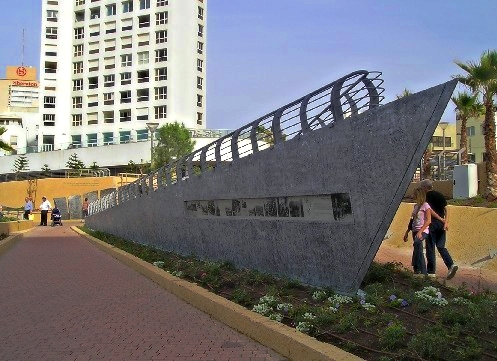
London Square

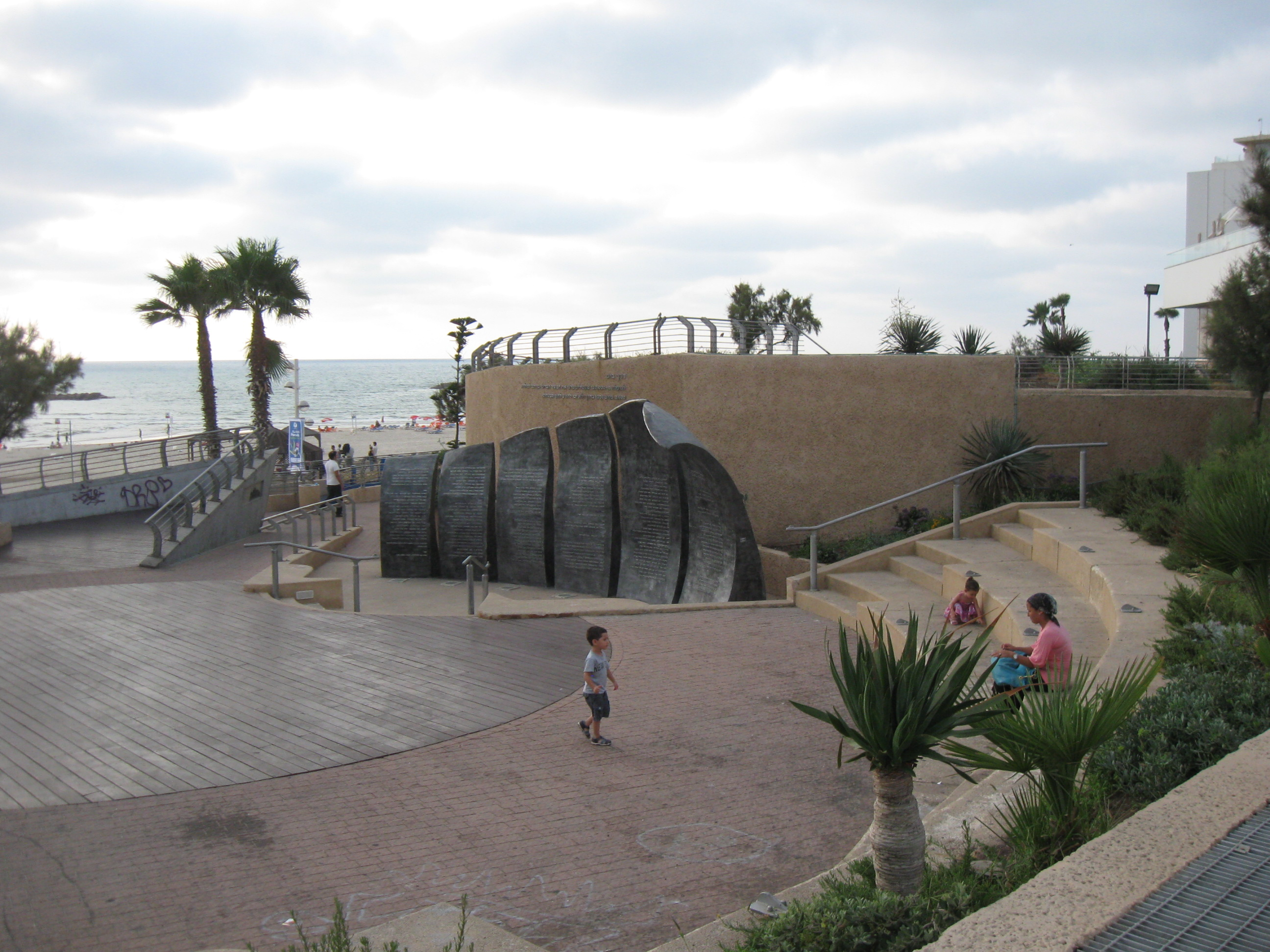
The square from Hayarkon Street
