= Sheraton Grand Tel Aviv Hotel =

Hotel in Tel Aviv, Israel

Coordinates: 32.0817°N 34.7678°E

Sheraton Grand Tel Aviv
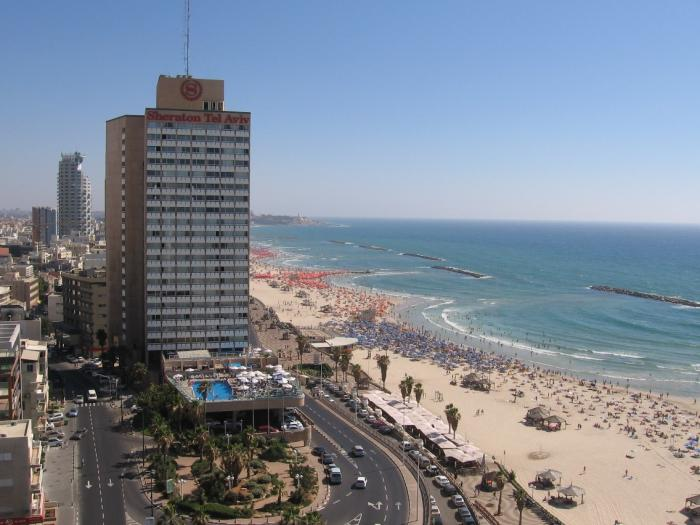
- Interactive map of the Sheraton Grand Tel Aviv area

General information
- Location: Tel Aviv, Israel, 115 Hayarkon Street
- Opening: March 12, 1977

Height
- Height: 81m

Technical details
- Floor count: 22

Design and construction
- Architects: Werner Joseph Wittkower, Yaakov Rechter

Other information
- Number of rooms: 318

The Sheraton Grand Tel Aviv is a large hotel on Hayarkon Street in Tel Aviv, Israel.

== History ==
=== First Hotel ===
The first Sheraton-Tel Aviv Hotel was located 1 mile north of today's hotel, on the north side of Independence Park. The hotel was originally designed in 1948 as the Nordau Plaza Hotel, and construction was 80 percent completed in 1952, when it was halted. The incomplete shell was acquired by Chicago-based investors in 1957, who planned to complete it, but that project collapsed. It was finally bought by a Milwaukee-based group, which completed the $4,500,000, 220-room, 7-story hotel. It opened in March 1961 as the Sheraton-Tel Aviv Hotel, the first Sheraton hotel outside the US and Canada. The 16th Chess Olympiad was held at the Sheraton-Tel Aviv in 1964. A 136-room wing was added to the hotel in November 1970. The Sheraton was renamed the Pal Hotel in 1974 and demolished in 1991. The site remains vacant today, but the adjacent beach is still known locally as Sheraton Beach.

=== Current Hotel ===
The current hotel was built by Ignatz Bubis and Emilio Bruns, and designed by Werner Joseph Wittkower (who had also designed the 1961 hotel) and Yaakov Rechter. It opened on March 12, 1977 as the Tel Aviv-Sheraton Hotel and was later known as the Sheraton Tel Aviv Hotel & Towers and then the Sheraton Tel Aviv Hotel. It was extensively renovated in 2022 and was renamed the Sheraton Grand Tel Aviv in 2023.

=== The site ===
A structure known as the Red House previously stood on the site of the current hotel. It was constructed in 1926 and served as the seat of the city council, and later the headquarters of the Haganah and the Mossad LeAliyah Bet, which coordinated the smuggling of illegal Jewish immigrants into British Mandatory Palestine. During the 1948 Arab–Israeli War, the Red House served as the headquarters of David Ben-Gurion and the supreme command of the Israel Defense Forces. After the war, it was briefly the seat of the Ministry of Foreign Affairs. The Red House was demolished to build the hotel. A plaque at the entrance to the hotel commemorates its history.

== Gallery ==
Sheraton Grand Tel Aviv

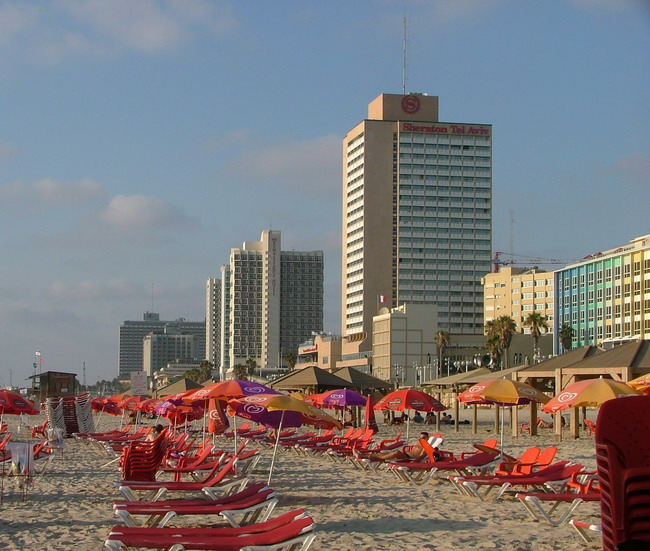
Sheraton Grand Tel Aviv seen from the beach

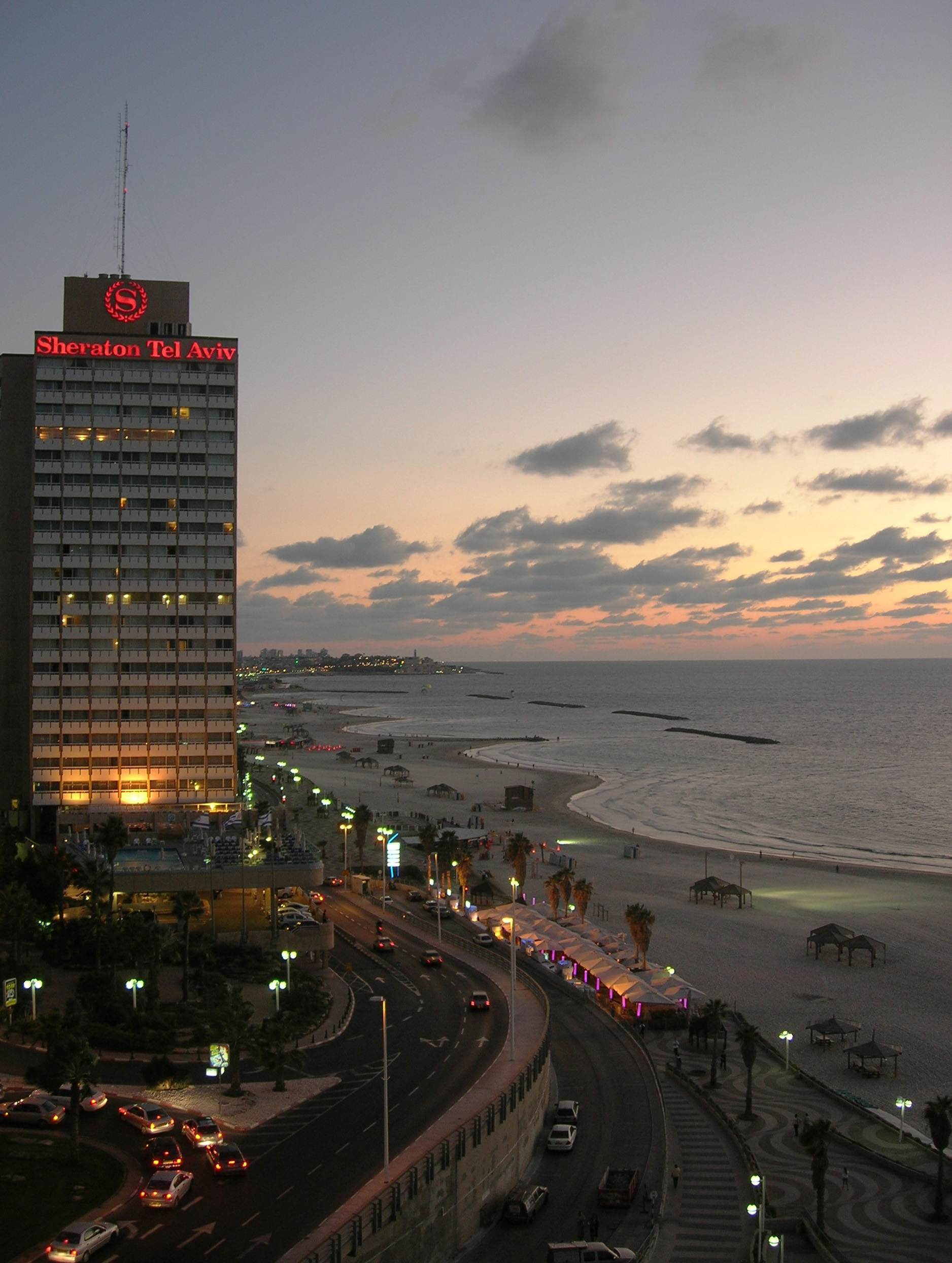
Sheraton Grand Tel Aviv

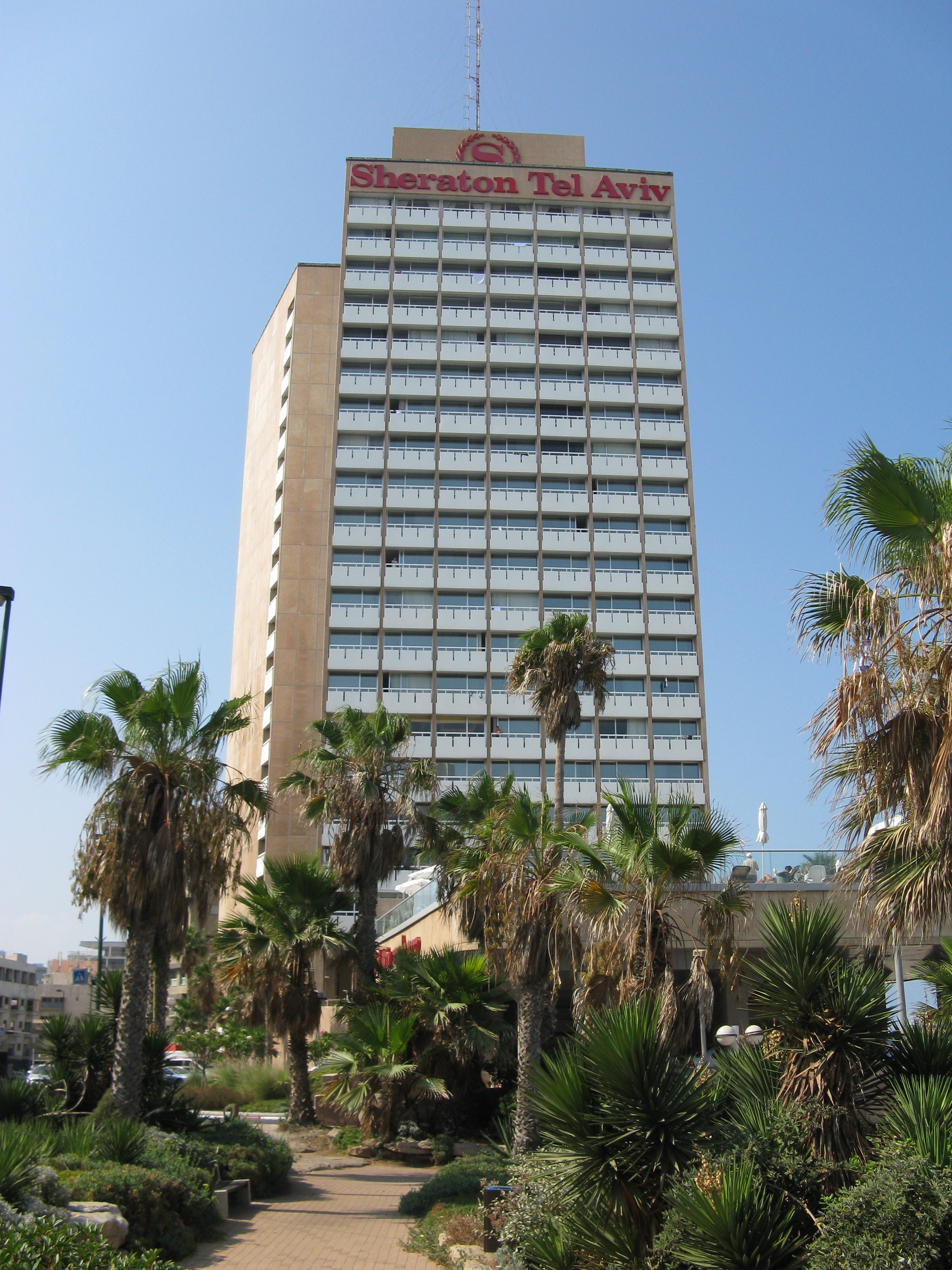
Sheraton Grand Tel Aviv

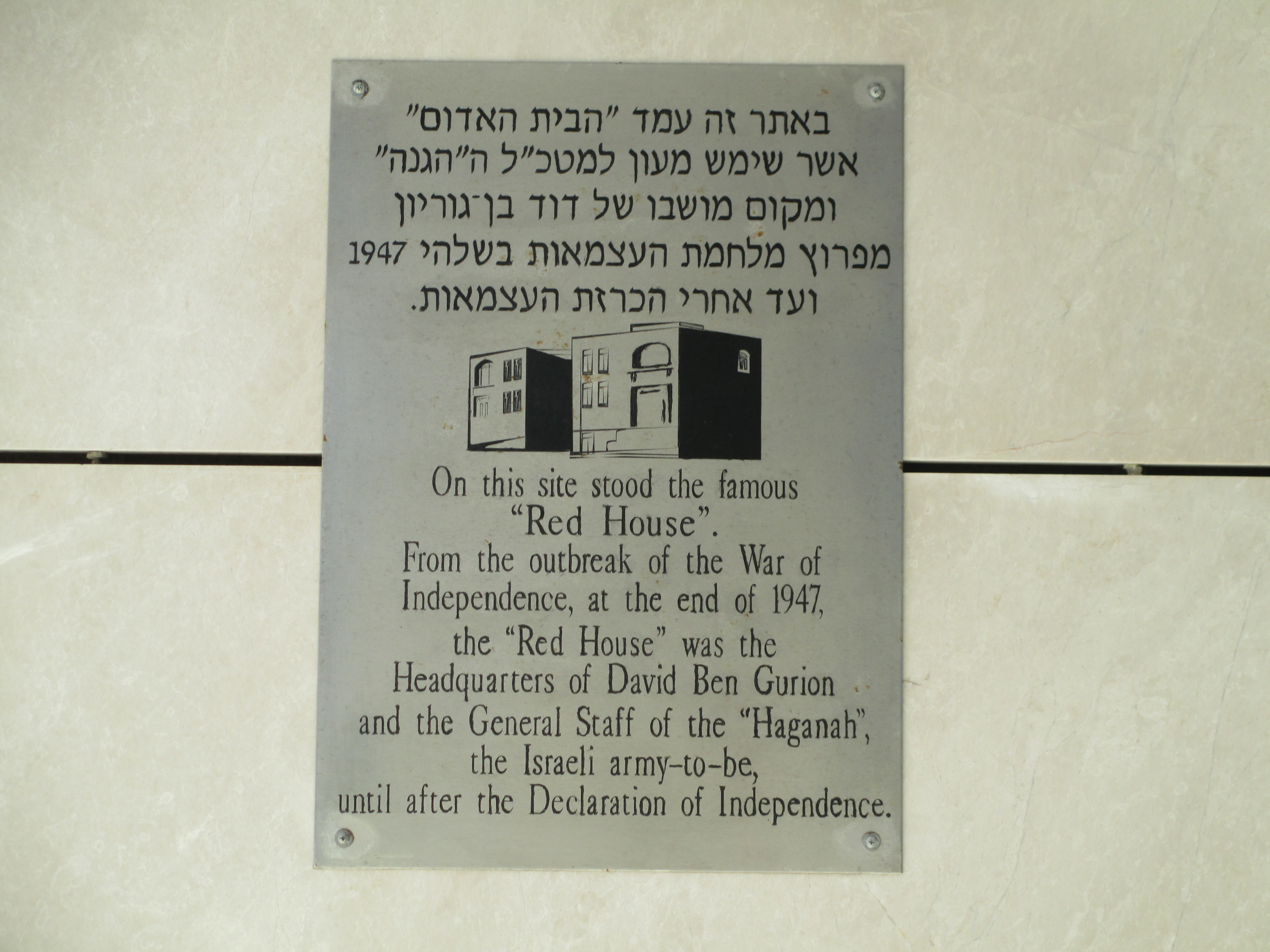
Memorial plaque to the Red House at the entrance of Sheraton Grand Tel Aviv

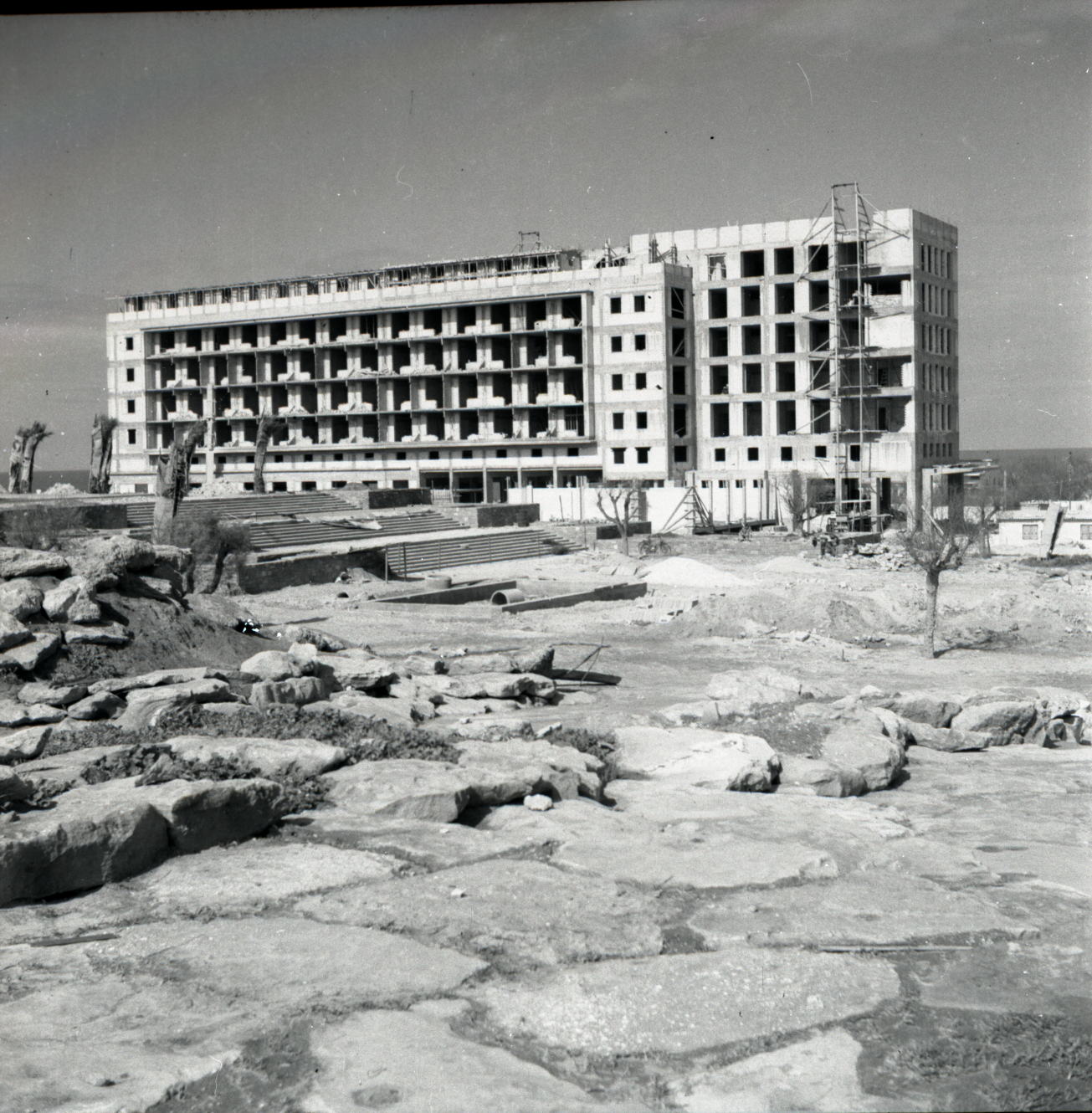
The partially completed Nordau Plaza Hotel, 1952. Later completed as the first Sheraton-Tel Aviv Hotel

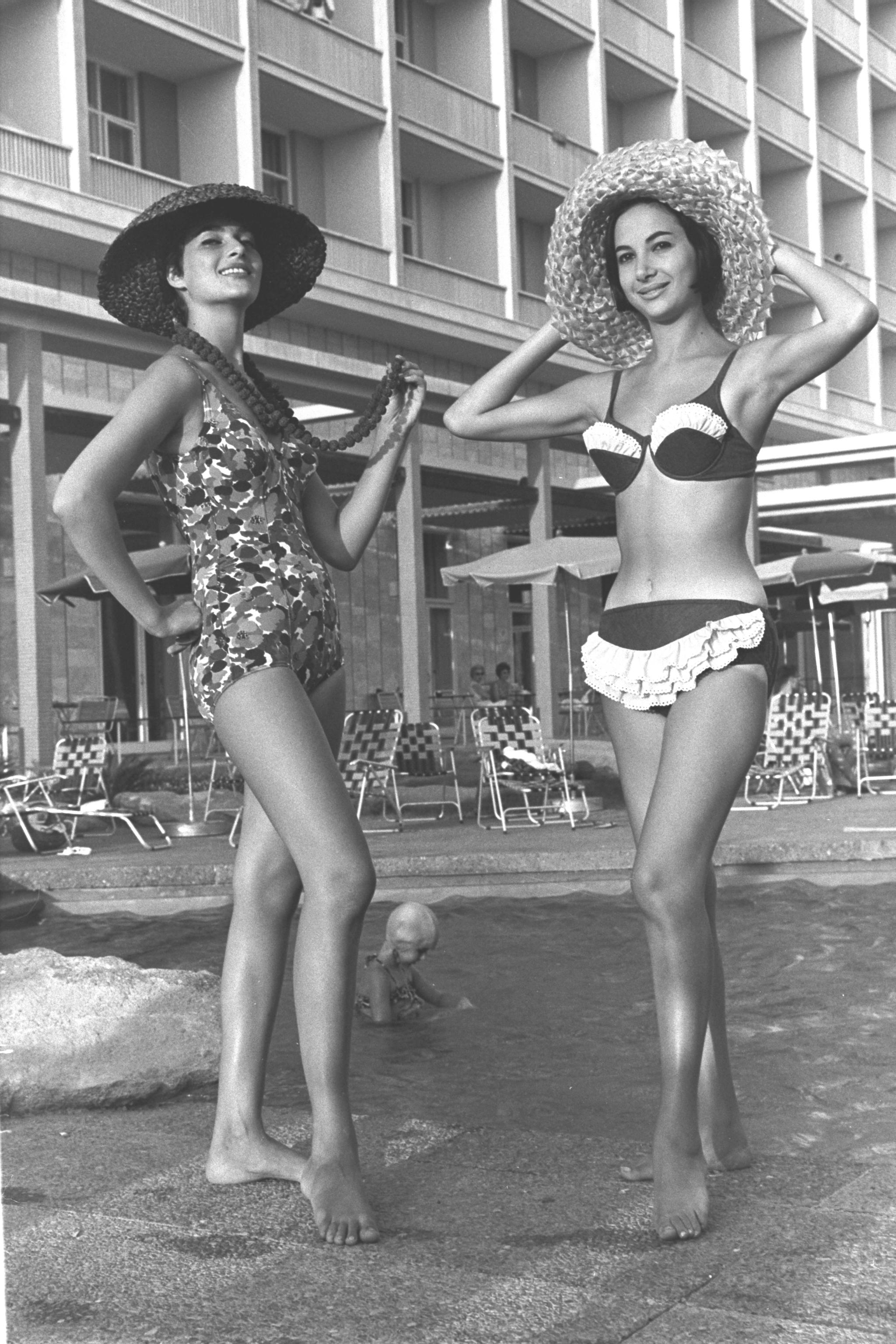
Models posing by the pool of the first Sheraton-Tel Aviv Hotel, July 1961

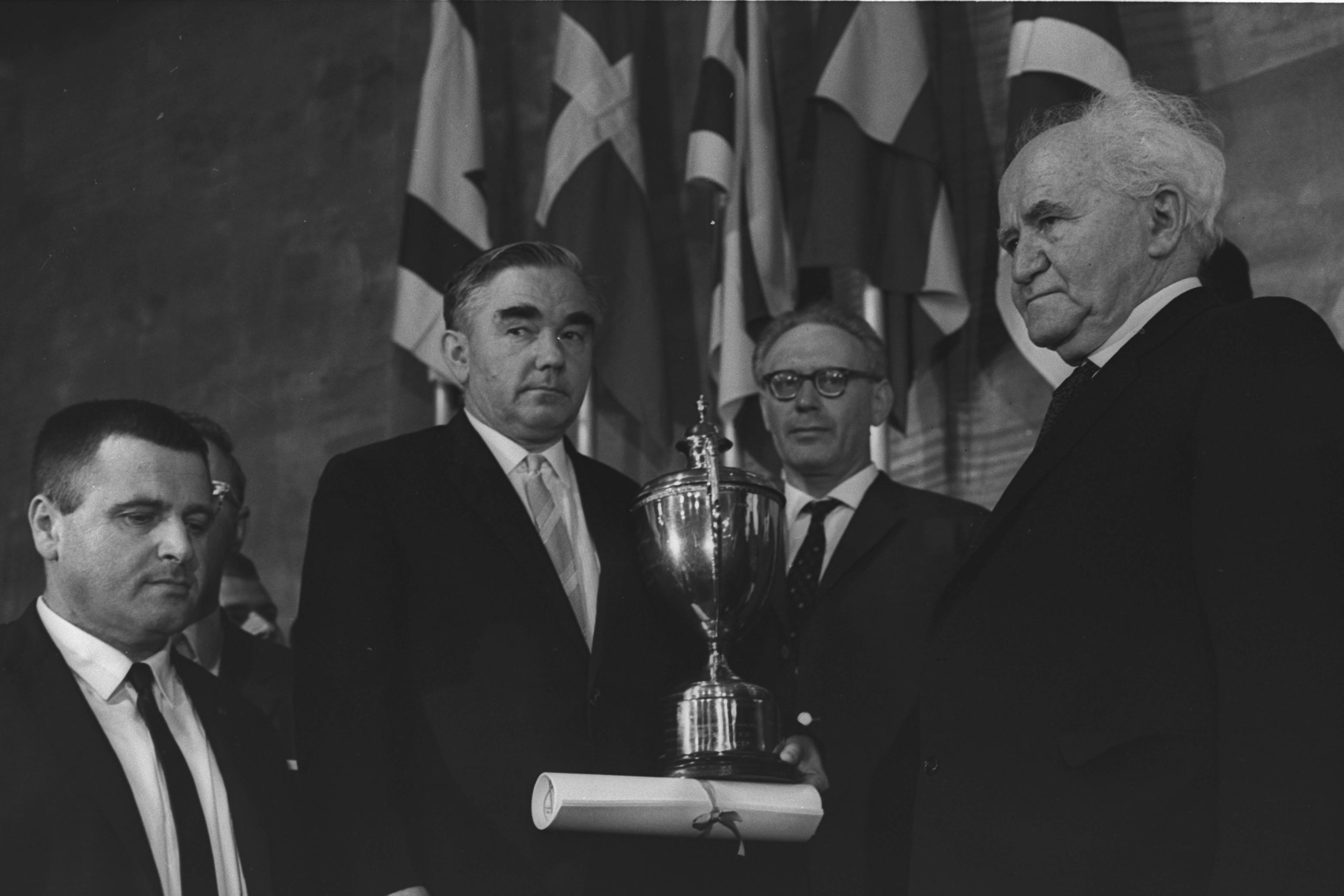
David Ben-Gurion with the winning Soviet team at the 16th Chess Olympiad, held at the first Sheraton in 1964

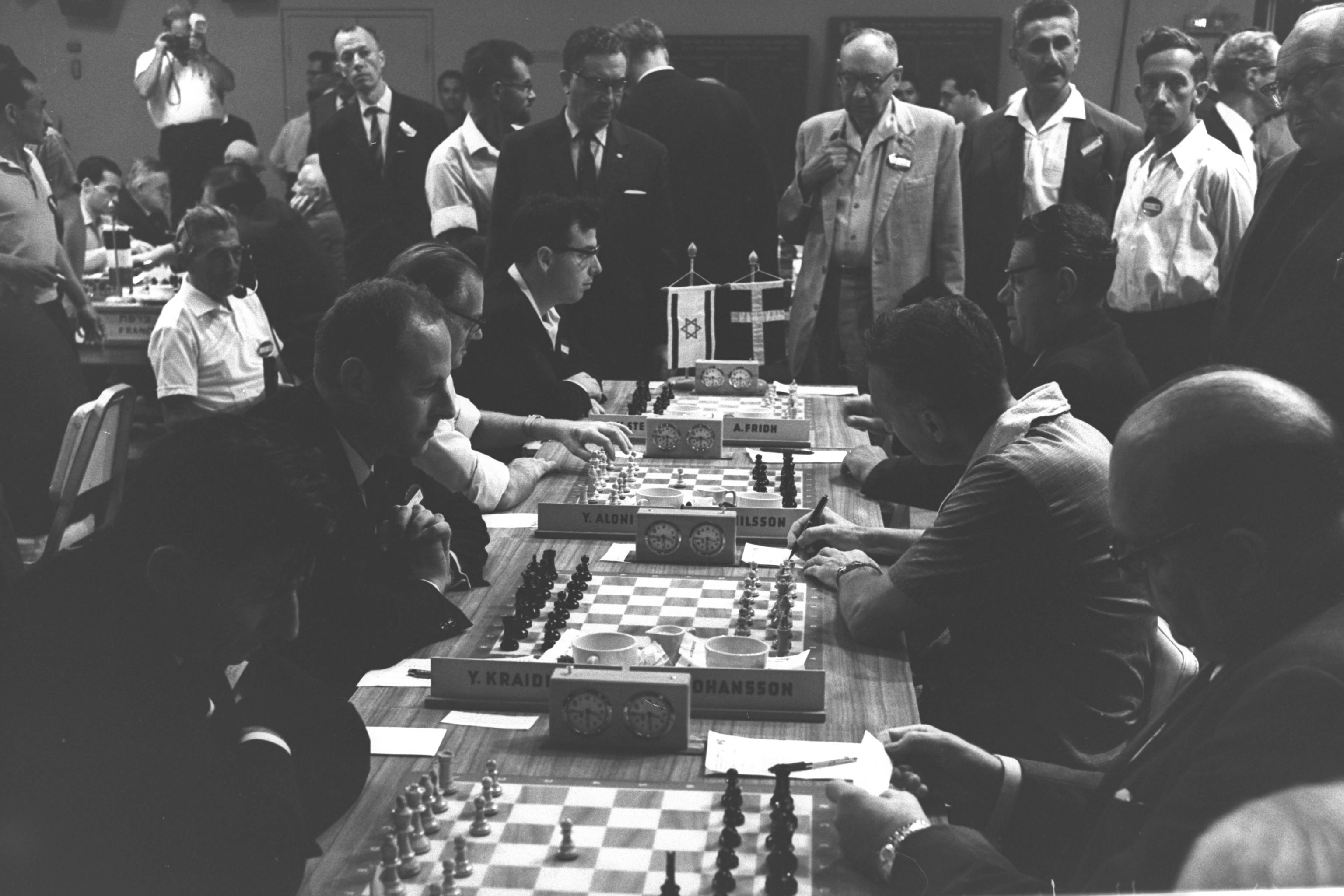
Sweden playing Israel at the 16th Chess Olympiad, held at the first Sheraton in 1964
