= Tel Aviv Promenade =

Structures built along the shore of the Israeli city

Coordinates: 32°4′36.65″N 34°45′57.44″E

- The Tayelet, הטיילת
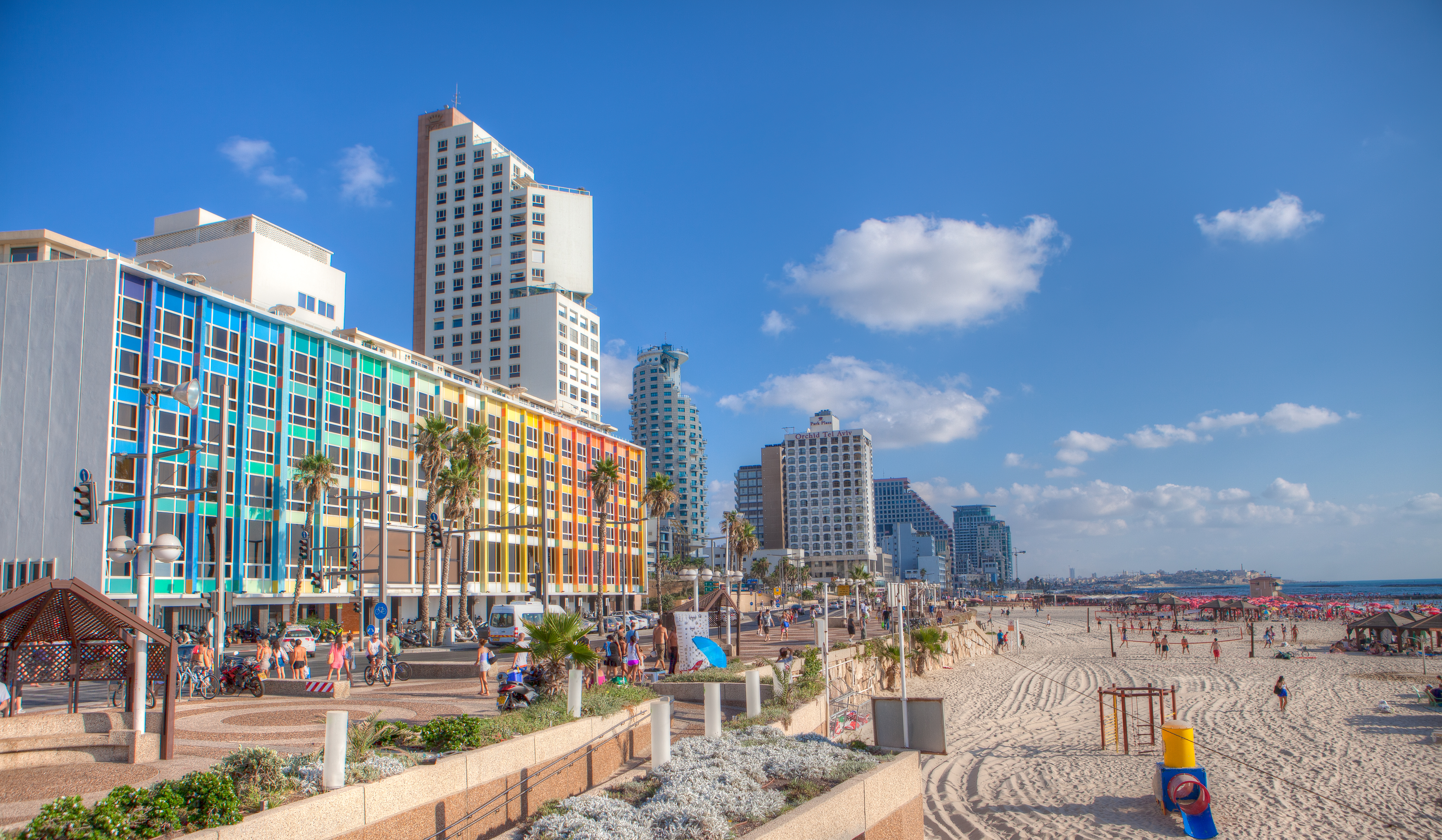
- Interactive map of Tel Aviv Promenade
- Location: Tel Aviv, Israel
- North end: Tel Baruch Beach
- South end: Jaffa Port

Construction
- Completion: 1930s

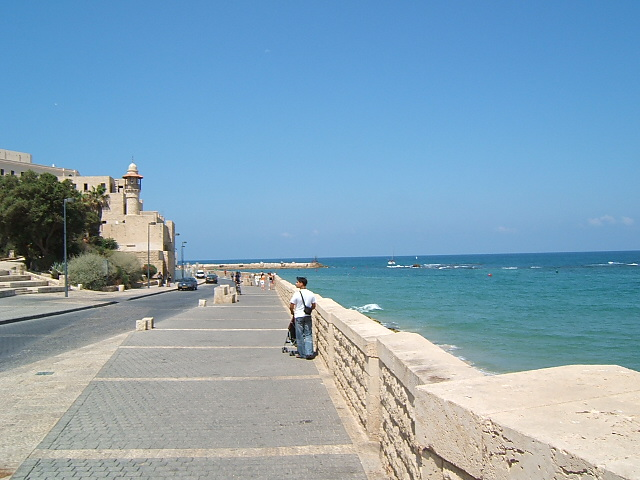
Yafo city walls promenade

Tel Aviv Promenade (Hebrew: טיילת תל אביב-יפו, commonly referred to in Hebrew simply as the Tayelet, הטיילת - "The Promenade") runs along the Mediterranean seashore in Tel Aviv, Israel.

== History ==
In the late 1930s, the city council decided to build a promenade for separation between bathing areas and hiking or promenading paths. It extended from Bograshov Beach to where Jerusalem (formerly Geula) Beach is located now. The introduction of the promenade was a turning point in common perception of the city's coastline.

At the same time, World War II started in September 1939, and the British Mandate Regime prohibited bathing in the beach. As a result of that, the city's beaches were abandoned and neglected. In addition, the developing new city was pouring its sewage to the sea and the beaches were banned for bathing for sanitary reasons. Seaside hotels and cafés were turning into questionable bars, gambling joints and brothels. The public abstained from the area, and the city's recreational centers were transferred to the city center, to areas such as Dizengoff Street.

In 1942, London Square was founded in the northern part of the promenade. In 1953, Gan-haAtsmaut (Independence Garden) was founded on the gravel hill above Hilton Beach. In 1965, at the time of the opening of the port of Ashdod, the ports of Tel Aviv and Jaffa were closed.

In the 1980s Shafdan, the Dan District sewage treatment facility, was founded, and the sewage was transferred to the plant and not to the sea. That enabled the cleansing of the beaches and preparations to be made in order to open them again to the public for bathing. During that period, tombolo breakwaters were placed, causing significant expansion of the beaches allowing a greater number of people to enter. In the scope of the project, beach facilities were restored and reopened.

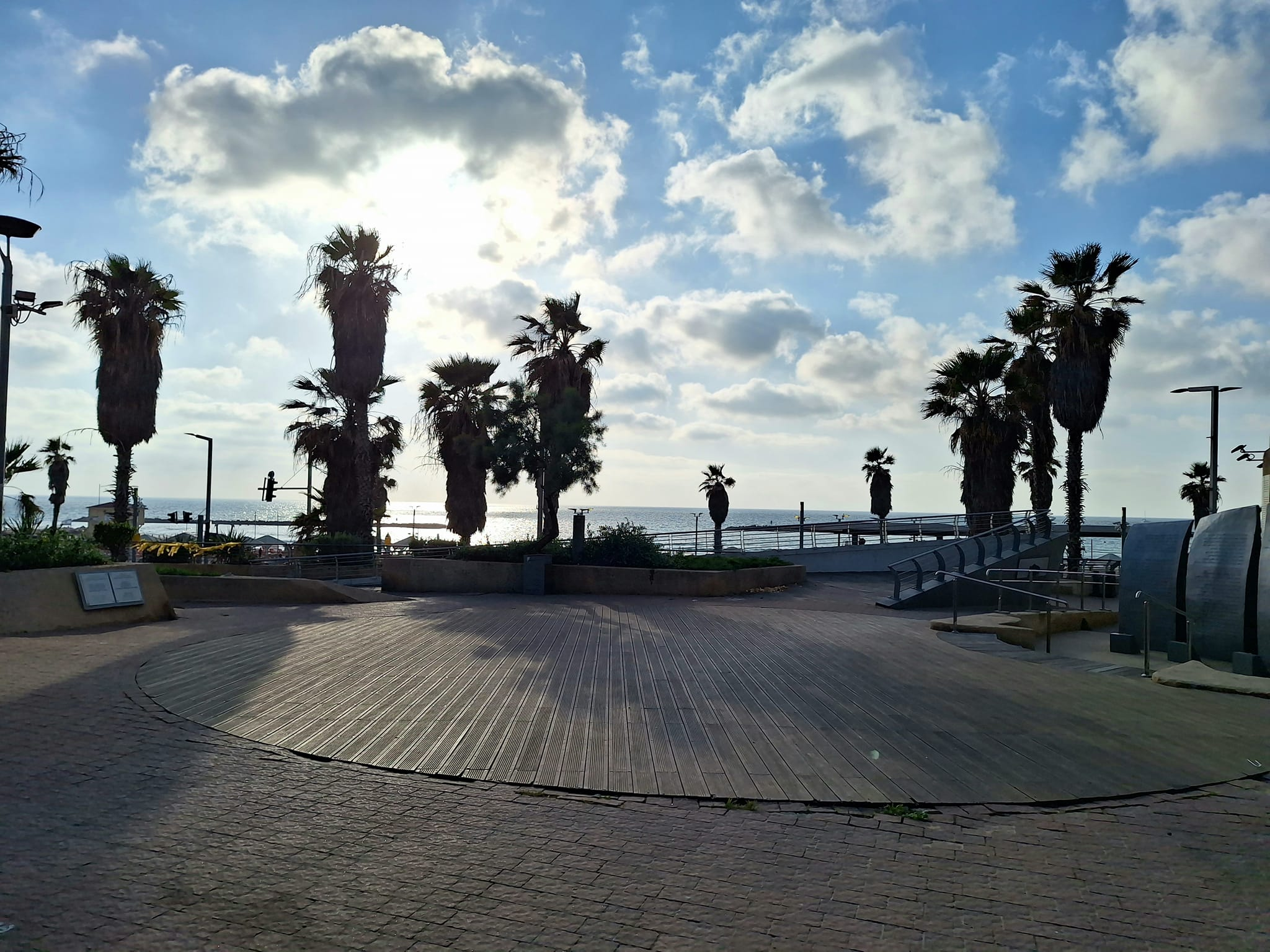
A view of the beach from Bogarshov St

In 2011, the municipality of Tel Aviv restored and renovated the promenade, and today it runs from the port of Tel Aviv to the port of Jaffa.

== Sections ==
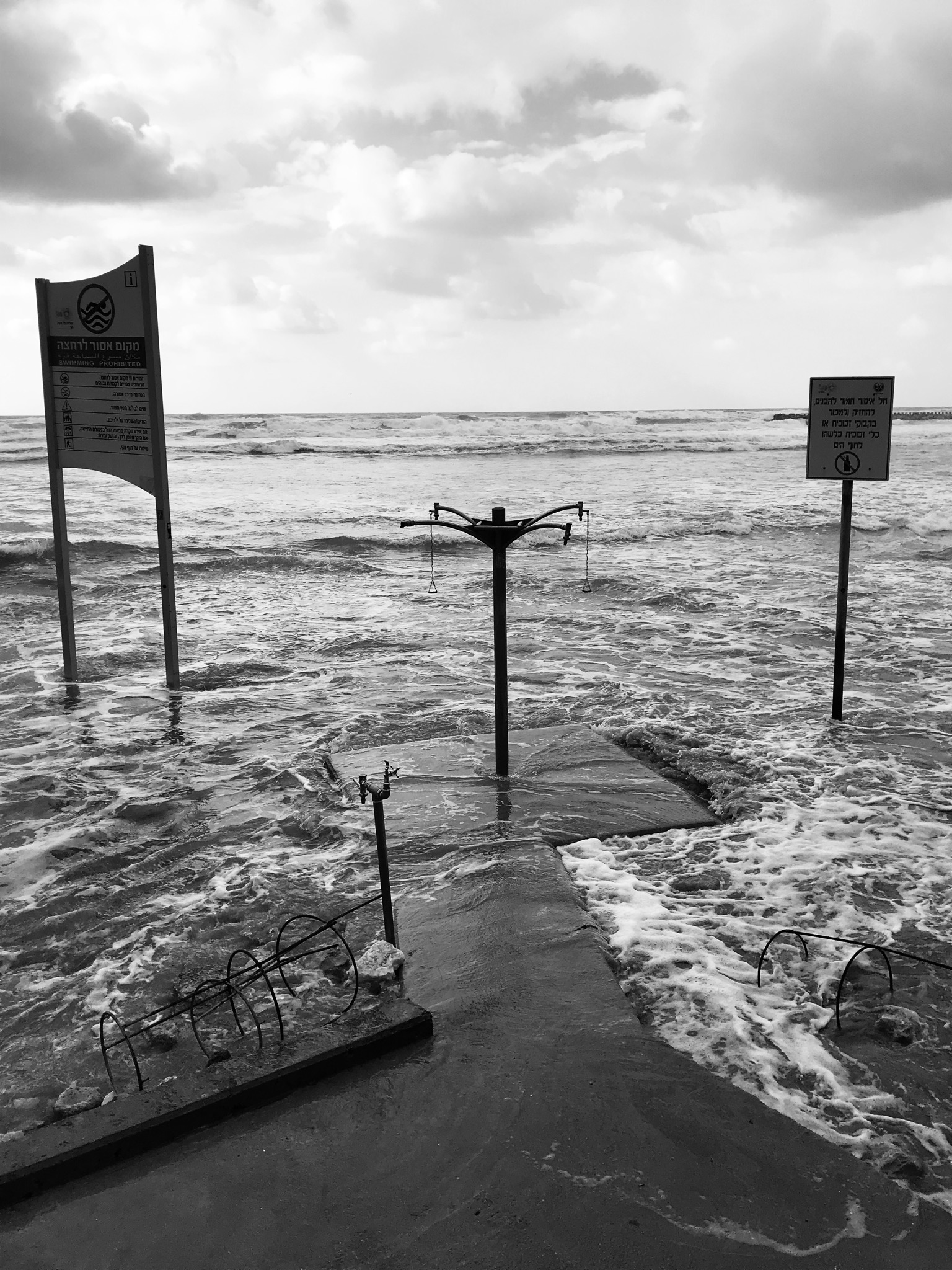
Tel Aviv Promenade, Metzizim winter flooding

- Tel Baruch Promenade - Tel Baruch Promenade runs between Tel Baruch Beach in the north and the Yarkon River in the south. It opened in 2009 in an area previously belonging to Reading Power Station and Sde Dov Airfield. The construction of the promenade required a long pedestrian bridge over the power station's docks. It is paved with concrete, with separate trails for pedestrians and bicyclists. The eastern side, adjacent to Sde Dov, is lined with shore vegetation, while the western side allows access to the undeclared beach along it. This section of the promenade is mostly secluded from the city, although there are plans for significant construction along it, should the airfield be relocated.
- Port Promenade - The Port Promenade runs along the restored Tel Aviv Port, between the mouth of the Yarkon River and Metzizim Beach. It opened in 2005, and it is made up of a wooden deck built along the Port's old sea wall. It is mostly commercial in nature, with many coffee houses, restaurants and shops, but without any bathing beaches.
- Metzizim/Hilton Promenade - This promenade runs between Metzizim Beach in the north and Gordon Beach in the south. This promenade has two distinct sections: an older one between Metzizim and Hilton Beaches and a newer one between Hilton and Gordon. It is somewhat narrower than Lahat Promenade because of its location between the kurkar (lithified sea sand) bluffs and the beach.
- Lahat Promenade (Herbert Samuel St.) - The main promenade in Tel Aviv, leading from Gordon beach to Aviv beach. The promenade was built in 1939 as a narrow promenade, elevated above sea level. In the 1980s it was demolished in preparation for reconstruction. In 1982, the first section was opened for public. The new promenade is broad and paved with pebbles. It is separated from the beach by a narrow strip of shore vegetation. On the promenade are several artistic sculptures and memorial plaques. In 1998, the promenade was renamed in honor of former mayor Shlomo Lahat, who was in office during the construction years and promoted the process.
- Sha'ar Le'Yafo Promenade (Gate to Jaffa promenade) - The section that links Charles Clore Park and Jaffa.
- Khomot ha'Yam Promenade (Sea barriers promenade) The section that links Sha'ar Le'Yafo Promenade and the Jaffa Port. The outline of the demolished ancient walls of Jaffa are marked out on the promenade pavement.

== See also ==
- History of Tel Aviv
