= Opera Tower (Tel Aviv) =

Building in Tel Aviv, Israel

Coordinates: 32.0740°N 34.7660°E

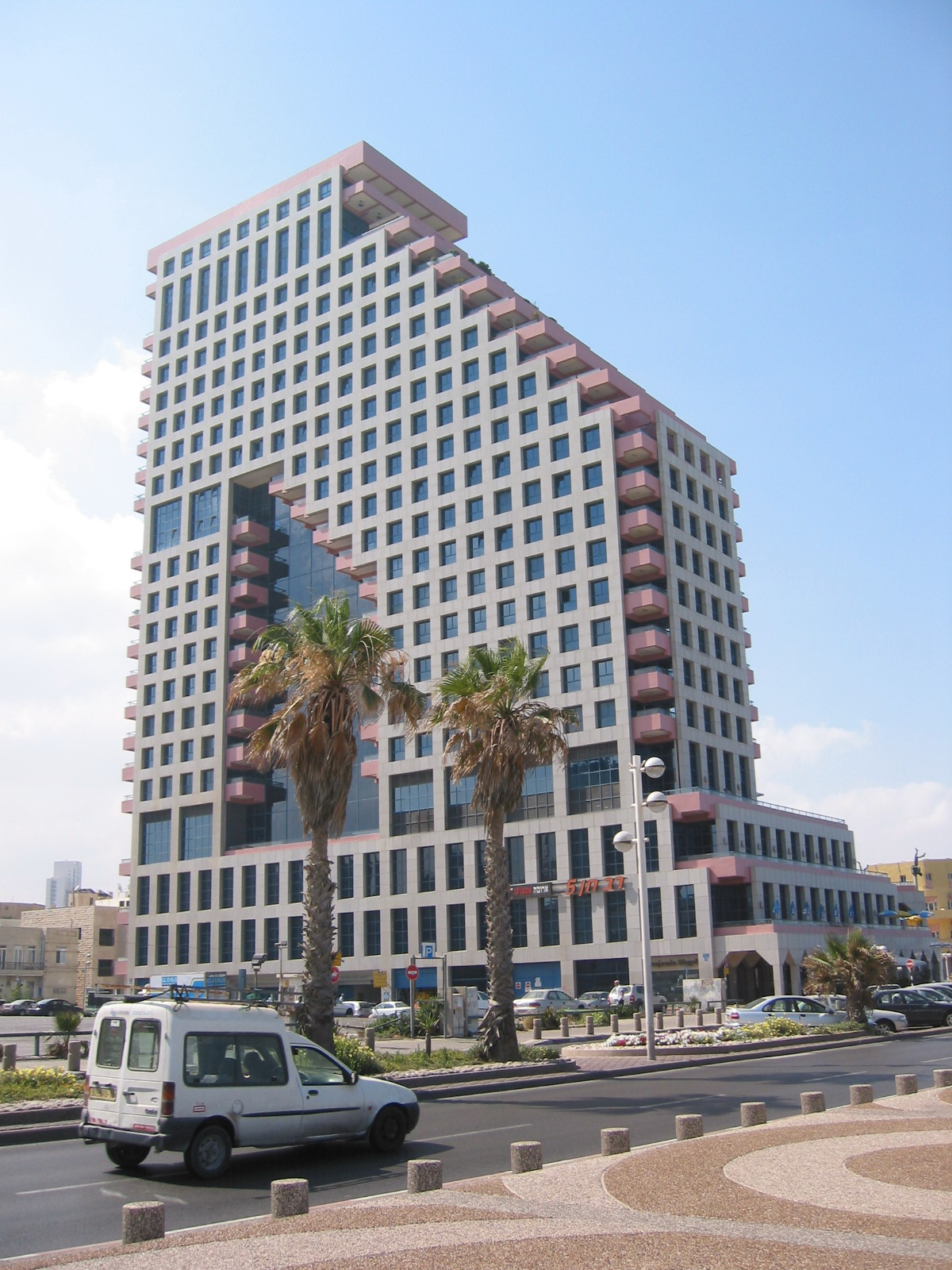
- The Opera Tower in June 2007
- Interactive map of the Opera Tower area

General information
- Location: 1 Allenby Street, Tel Aviv, Israel

Height
- Roof: 82 metres

Technical details
- Floor count: 23

The Opera Tower is a 23-story building in Tel Aviv, Israel completed in 1993. It has 25 floors, mostly used as a hotel and residential apartments. It was constructed in the post-modern style.

It is located on 1 Allenby Street in the western part of Tel Aviv.
