= Africa Israel Investments =

Investment company

Africa Israel Investments Ltd.
- Type: Public
- Traded as: TASE: AFIL
- Industry: Holding & Investment
- Founded: 1934; 92 years ago
- Headquarters: Yehud, Israel
- Key people: Lev Leviev, Chairman of the Board; Shaul Gliksberg, CFO
- Website: www.africa-israel.com

Africa Israel Investments Ltd. (AFI Group) is an international holding and investment company based in Yehud, Israel. The group consists of several private and public companies active in areas such as real estate, construction, infrastructure, manufacturing, tourism and leisure. The company’s shares are traded on the Tel Aviv Stock Exchange and are a constitute of the TA-35 Index.

== History ==
=== Early years ===
Africa Israel Investments was founded in 1934, during the British Mandate, by Jewish investors from South Africa who wanted to support development in the local economy of the Yishuv. After the establishment of the state of Israel the company expanded its commercial and financial activities and was one of the first companies in the country whose shares were traded on the Tel Aviv Stock Exchange. In the early 1970s control of the company was acquired by Bank Leumi. From 1978 to 1996 Shlomo Grofman served as President and CEO of the company. In early 1997, Lev Leviev acquired control of the company and Grofman left.

=== Acquisition by Lev Leviev ===
In November 1996, the diamond cutter and diamond merchant Lev Leviev acquired control from Bank Leumi; he soon expanded the group’s activities into new markets and territories. Including: energy – Dor-Alon in Israel, US and Europe. Real Estate – AFI development, Russia, USA and Europe. Manufacturing – AFI Industries (by acquiring Packer Plada).

=== Debt restructuring ===
After the 2008 financial crisis, the company was hurt by the drop of real estate values in the United States, Russia and eastern Europe. It defaulted on a series of bonds and in 2010 it restructured 7.4 billion shekels of debt.

In 2016, the company sought a second debt settlement. In a recorded conversation that was leaked to Israel Channel 10 News, Lev Leviev is heard saying: "I shit on every bank, but they haven't been able to make me move a centimeter because I don't owe any of them money, to no bank in the world. I piss on every bank from above, even Rakefet" (referring to Bank Leumi CEO Rakefet Russak-Aminoach).

=== Controversy ===
The company became the subject of newspaper coverage in 2008, for Leviev's association with the construction of Israeli settlements on the West Bank. The British Embassy in Israel was planning to move into the Kirya Tower, one of its buildings, but cancelled when these ties were revealed in the British media.

In September 2009, Leviev's empire was on the verge of collapse. During the real estate bubble of the early 2000s, he had borrowed huge sums of money to acquire property around the world, including America. As American real estate prices plummeted and market values declined to less than half of what Leviev had paid for properties, so did the value of Africa Israel investments. Leviev said: "Our main mistake was the investments in the U.S."

In 2009, Africa Israel's recently constructed private prison near Beersheba was banned by Israel's High Court of Justice. The prison had not yet been occupied when it was declared unconstitutional.

In 2009, BlackRock divested from the company, allegedly "due to firm's involvement in West Bank settlement construction."

Following campaigning by the Boycott, Divestment and Sanctions movement, in January 2010 Danske Bank added Africa Israel to the list of companies that fail its Socially Responsible Investment policy; a bank spokesman noted that it was acting in the interests of its customers by not 'placing their money in companies that violate international standards'. In October 2011, Africa Israel sold the Metropolitan Life Insurance Company Tower for US$165 million, increasing its cash flow by $88 million. In the third quarter 2011, Africa Israel made a NIS 148 million profit. The company recorded net gains in real estate investment for the first nine months of 2011 in the amount of NIS 712 million ($188 million), of which NIS 599 million ($159 million) were recorded in the third quarter.

On 30 January 2014, the Government Pension Fund of Norway excluded Africa Israel Investments from its portfolio, citing "Serious violations of individuals' rights in situations of war or conflict."

On 17 November 2014, the Cypriot AFI Development Plc, which did not file its 2012 financial results indicator report and delayed filing its 2013 financial results indicator until March 18, 2014, was fined by the Cyprus SEC for lack of transparency a violation of the section 13 (1) Law.

== Major holdings ==
=== Real estate ===
- AFI Development Plc LSE: AFI– Russia: A public company traded in the London Stock Exchange. Founded in 2001, this company is one of the largest real estate developments companies in Russia, focusing on large scale projects in Moscow and other main cities in Russia in the residential, offices, shopping malls, hotels and infrastructure sectors, such as the Mall of Russia and the Tverskaya Zastava site.
- AFI USA: Established in 2002, the company focuses on exclusive residential projects, income producing properties and hotels. The company is active in New York where it owns The Apthorp residential building and formerly 229 West 43rd Street. It is moreover active in Miami, Los Angeles and Phoenix, and was a partner in the Hard Rock amusement park in Myrtle Beach, South Carolina (permanently closed) and holds building rights for a mega project in Las Vegas.
- AFI Europe: The company has been coordinating the group’s activities in Europe since 1998. It owns residential, office and shopping mall projects in the Czech Republic, Serbia, Bulgaria, Romania, Poland, Hungary, Germany and Latvia. Among its outstanding assets is the "Palace Flora" mall in Prague and it is building the "Cotroceni Park" in Bucharest, which upon its completion will become the largest mall in Romania. Cotroceni Park opened on 29 October 2009, as the "AFI Palace Cotroceni".
- Africa Israel Residences Ltd.: TASE: AFRE A public company traded on the Tel Aviv Stock Exchange operating in Israel under the “Savionim” brand name, Africa Israel develops entire neighborhoods including shopping centers, schools, green areas, cultural and sports facilities.
- AFI Properties Ltd.: TASE: AFPR A public company traded on the Tel Aviv Stock Exchange holding shopping centers and office buildings.
- GetResidency Ltd.: A company specializing in real estate brokerage, previously headquartered in Zurich, Switzerland. In January 2025, founder of GetResidency, confirmed the sale of the company to Africa Israel. Africa Israel owns 100% of the company.

=== Construction and infrastructures ===
Danya Cebus TASE: DNYA is the construction and infrastructures arm of Africa Israel, listed on the Tel Aviv Stock Exchange. Danya Cebus is involved in major infrastructure projects in Israel, Russia, Romania and North America.

BOT & PFI Projects: Africa Israel owns 37.5% of the company operating the Cross-Israel Highway (Highway 6), Israel’s first toll road. Other BOT and PFI activities include Highway 431, Israel's first private penitentiary, student dormitories at the Hebrew University and the Tel Aviv Light Rail.

=== Energy and food retail ===
Alon Group: Consists of Dor Alon Oil TASE: DRAL, Israel's largest international energy group; Alon USA Energy, Inc. NYSE: ALJ which operates the Big Spring refinery, 1,700 FINA gas stations in several states, terminals, more than 1,850 miles of oil pipelines, asphalt factories and more than 170 7-Eleven convenience stores. Dor Energy: A national network of gas stations and Super Alonit convenience stores in Israel, controlling also Blue Square, Israel's third largest supermarket chain.

=== Industry ===
AFI Industries: Africa Israel holds a major interest in AFI Industries (formerly Packer Plada), Israel’s largest steel company and Negev Ceramics, the country’s leading company in design and manufacture of building and interior design ceramic products. AFI Industries is also active in Russia and intends to expand its activities to additional countries.

=== Tourism and leisure ===
Africa Israel Hotels holds the Crowne Plaza and Holiday Inn franchise in Israel, operates 10 hotels in Israel (2,250 rooms) a Spa Hotel in Kislovodsk, Russia (400 rooms), a hotel in Germany, and 3 hotels in Bucharest, Romania, and is expanding its operations in Europe. It also holds and operates an amusement park in Eilat, Israel.

=== Fashion ===
The company's fashion Brands include Gottex, Gideon Oberson, Christina (Canada) and other beachwear international brands, and the Zara and Pull & Bear franchises in Israel.

Lev Leviev and the Africa-Israel Group acquired Gottex in 1997, from its founder and chief designer Lea Gottlieb. After about a year heading the design team, Gottlieb left the company.

=== Communications and media ===
The company has a controlling stake in Tadiran Telecom which develops telecom solutions and in Channel 9 (Israel), a TV station serving Russian speakers.

== Recent disposals ==
- In June 2009, Africa Israel Group sold its 50 percent stake in the Gottex swimwear firm to its joint venture partners for 44 million shekel (US$11.3 million).
- In March 2009, Africa Israel Properties sold its stakes in two shopping centres in the Tel Aviv area to Melisron Ltd TASE: MLSR, a company controlled by the Ofer Brothers Group.

== See also ==
- Economy of Israel
