= Shlomo Grofman =

Israeli real estate developer

- שלמה גרופמן
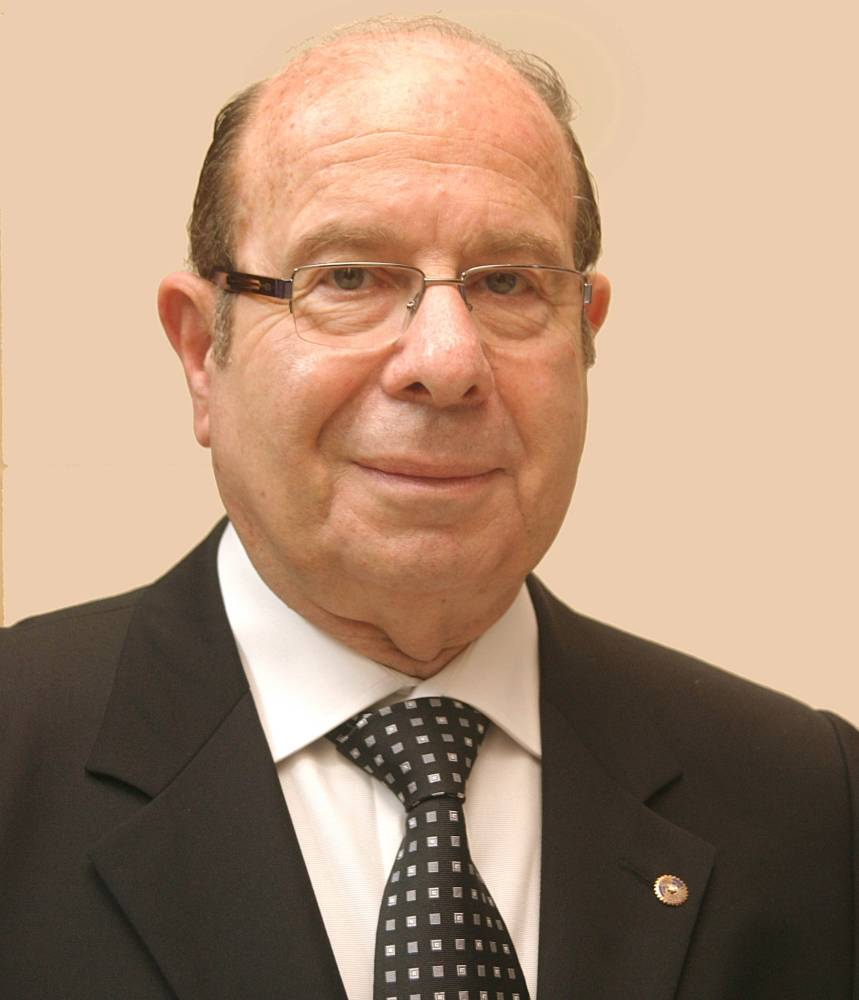
- Occupations: Businessperson, Real Estate Developer
- Known for: Real Estate Development, Business Leadership
- Notable work: Faire Fund, Shoval Grofman Real Estate Limited, Grofman Holdings Ltd.

Shlomo Grofman (Hebrew: שלמה גרופמן) is an Israeli businessperson known for his work in the real estate industry. He serves as the active chairman of the Faire Fund (First American Israeli Real Estate Fund), co-founded with former Israeli Ambassador Zalman Shoval. The fund, with a capital of 90 million US dollars, focuses on real estate development investments in Israel. Additionally, Grofman is the chairman of Shoval Grofman Real Estate Limited.

In addition to his involvement in real estate, Grofman is the chairman of Grofman Holdings Ltd., a private investment company, and Sarel Medical Supplies and Equipment Ltd., which is a medical supplies company in Israel. He also chairs Ayalon Holdings Ltd., the parent company of Ayalon Insurance, a publicly traded company on the Tel Aviv Stock Exchange. In 2016, he was appointed as the Honorary Consul of Kenya in Israel. Grofman's roles extend to the Israel-America Chamber of Commerce where he is a member of the Board of Directors, the International March of the Living as Deputy Chairman of the Board, and he is an ambassador for the Sheba Medical Center in the United States.

== Biography ==
Shlomo Grofman is the active chairman of Faire Fund (First American Israeli Real Estate Fund), which he established together with former Israeli Ambassador Zalman Shoval. A private equity fund with a capital of 90 million US dollars, Faire Fund is involved in locating and managing investments such as HaYarkon 96 in real estate development in Israel. Additional, Mr. Grofman is chairman of Shoval Grofman Real Estate Limited.

Shlomo Grofman is currently acting also as chairman of Grofman Holdings Ltd. (a private investment company), Sarel Medical Supplies and Equipment Ltd. (Israel's largest medical supplies company) and Ayalon Holdings Ltd (the mother company of Ayalon Insurance a company listed on the Stock Exchange).

In July 2016 Shlomo Grofman was endorsed by the Governments of Kenya Israel to serve as the Honorary Consul of Kenya in Israel.

Shlomo Grofman serves as a member of the Board of Directors of the Israel-America Chamber of Commerce; Deputy Chairman of the Board of Directors of the International March of the Living; and as the Ambassador of the Sheba Medical Center in the United States, and member of the Board of Directors of the Sheba Medical Center New York.

From 1978 to 1996 Shlomo Grofman served as managing director and CEO of Africa Israel Investment Company Ltd. During Mr. Grofman's tenure, Africa Israel has developed into a conglomerate with substantial holdings and interests in real estate development and construction, insurance, industry, energy, hotels and tourism. While Mr. Grofman led Africa Israel, he initiated and supervised highly prosperous investments in residential development, office buildings, shopping malls, industrial parks and hotels. One of the highlights in Africa Israel's diversified real estate activity was the development of new neighborhoods: Savion, Givat Savion, Savioney Aviv, Savioney Gan, Kiryat Hasvionim, Neve Savion and Savioney Yam. These neighborhoods and the brand name Savion have become a synonym for a modern, high standard, fully equipped residential environment. Shlomo Grofman has also served as the Chairman of the Board of Denya Cybus Ltd., wholly owned subsidiary of Africa Israel and one of Israel's leading construction and infrastructure companies.

Shlomo Grofman established and developed two major hotel chains in Israel – Holiday Inn and Howard Johnson. As an appreciation for his achievements in introducing those chains to the Israeli market he was awarded several prizes. From 1992 to 1996 he served as chairman of the board of Holiday Inn Hotels EMEA (Europe, Middle East, Mediterranean & Africa), and member of the World Board of Directors of Holiday Inn International. From 1996 to 1999 he was a member of the World Board of Directors of Howard Johnson Hotels & Inns.

Shlomo Grofman is closely acquainted with the banking and insurance industries. From 1986 to 1988 he was a member of the executive committee of Bank Leumi LeIsrael Ltd. (Israel's second largest bank) and head of the bank's non-banking and financial services division. From 1986 to 1995 he served as the chairman of the board of Migdal Insurance Group. (Israel's largest insurance group) in which the Italian insurance giant Generali held a controlling stake.

Mr. Grofman was a member of the board of directors of Carmel Investment Group Ltd (public investment company) and of Ayalon Holdings Ltd. (investment, properties, holdings and insurance) and as the Chairman of Mayanei Hayeshua Medical Center.

Shlomo Grofman has been involved in numerous voluntary and nonprofit activities. Among other things, he was governor of Rotary Israel and a special advisor of the World President of Rotary International. He also served as the Chairman of the Friends of the Weitzman Institute. Mr. Grofman is currently chairman of the Board of Trustees of the Interdisciplinary Center for Law, Politics and Business in Herzliya, Chairman of Yuval – the Ensemble for Jewish and Cantorial Music and Member of the Israel-America Chamber of Commerce.
