= Bauhaus =

German art school and art movement

Bauhaus and its sites in Weimar, Dessau and Bernau
UNESCO World Heritage Site
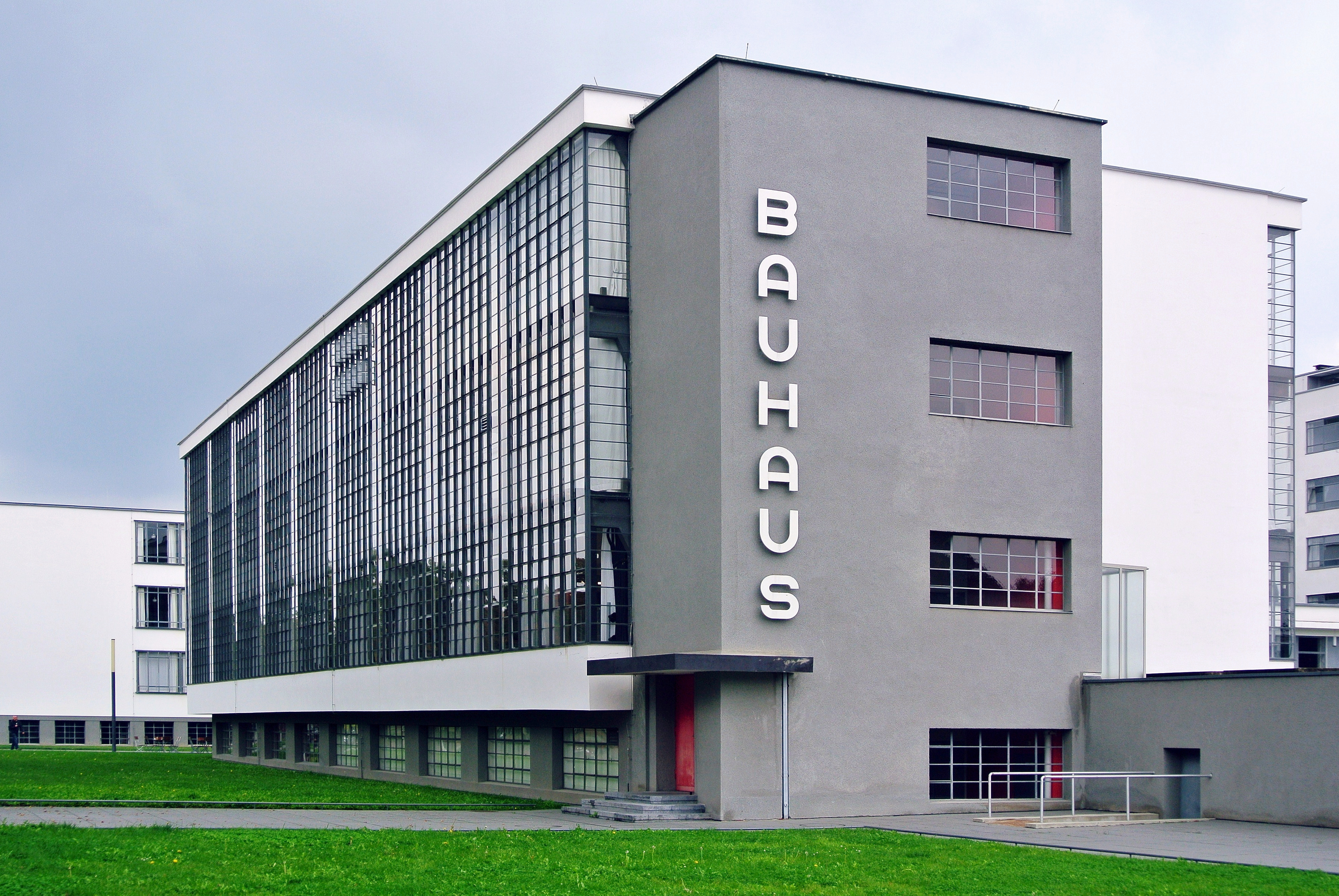
- The Bauhaus building in Dessau was designed by Walter Gropius. It was the longest-serving of the three Bauhaus locations (1925–1932).
- Location: Germany
- Criteria: Cultural: ii, iv, vi
- Reference: 729
- Inscription: 1996 (20th Session)
- Area: 8.1614 ha (20.167 acres)
- Buffer zone: 59.26 ha (146.4 acres)
- Bauhaus (Germany)

The Bauhaus emblem, designed by Oskar Schlemmer, was adopted in 1922.

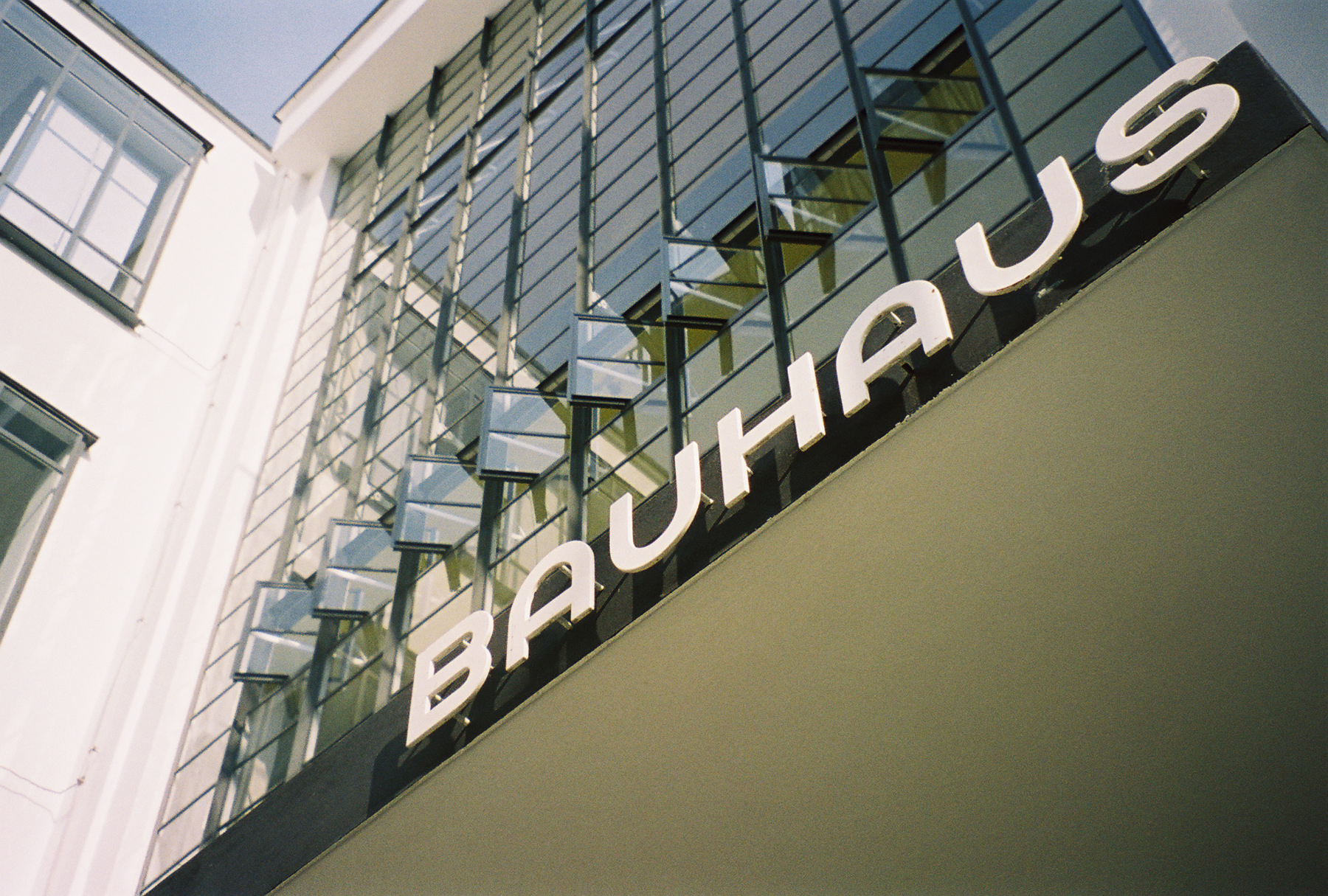
Typography by Herbert Bayer above the entrance to the workshop block of the Bauhaus Dessau, 2005

The Staatliches Bauhaus (German: [ˈʃtaːtlɪçəs ˈbaʊˌhaʊs]), commonly known as the Bauhaus (German for 'building house'), was a German art school operational from 1919 to 1933 that combined crafts and the fine arts. The school became famous for its approach to design, which attempted to unify individual artistic vision with the principles of mass production and emphasis on function.

The Bauhaus was founded by architect Walter Gropius in Weimar. It was grounded in the idea of creating a Gesamtkunstwerk ("comprehensive artwork") in which all the arts would eventually be brought together. The Bauhaus style later became one of the most influential currents in modern design, modernist architecture, and architectural education. The Bauhaus movement had a profound influence on subsequent developments in art, architecture, graphic design, interior design, industrial design, and typography. Staff at the Bauhaus included prominent artists such as Paul Klee, Wassily Kandinsky, Gunta Stölzl, and László Moholy-Nagy at various points.

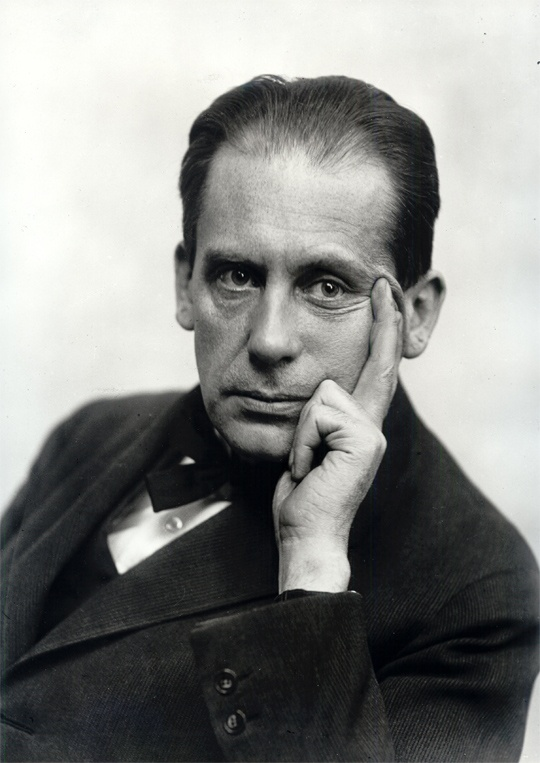
Bauhaus founder Walter Gropius (1883–1969)

The school existed in three German cities—Weimar, from 1919 to 1925, Dessau, from 1925 to 1932, and Berlin, from 1932 to 1933. During this period, it had three architect-directors: Walter Gropius from 1919 to 1928; Hannes Meyer from 1928 to 1930; and Ludwig Mies van der Rohe from 1930 until 1933, when the school was closed by its own leadership under pressure from the Nazi regime, having been painted as a centre of communist intellectualism. Internationally, former key figures of Bauhaus were successful in the United States and became known as the avant-garde for the International Style. The White City of Tel Aviv, to which numerous Jewish Bauhaus architects emigrated, has the highest concentration of the Bauhaus' international architecture in the world.

The changes of venue and leadership resulted in a constant shifting of focus, technique, instructors, and politics. For example, the pottery shop was discontinued when the school moved from Weimar to Dessau, even though it had been an important revenue source. In 1930, the mayor of Dessau Fritz Hesse dismissed Hannes Meyer following a scandal about alleged use of school funds for communist causes, appointing Mies van der Rohe as his successor. van der Rohe transformed the Bauhaus into a private school, and barred supporters of the previous' director Hannes Meyer from the school. Still, the Dessau campus was shuttered in 1932, after the Nazi party took over the local government of the Free State of Anhalt.

== Terms and concepts ==
Several specific features are identified in the Bauhaus forms and shapes: simple geometric shapes like rectangles and spheres, without elaborate decorations. Buildings, furniture, and fonts often feature rounded corners, sometimes rounded walls, or curved chrome pipes. Some buildings are characterized by rectangular features, for example protruding balconies with flat, chunky railings facing the street, and long banks of windows. Some outlines can be defined as a tool for creating an ideal form, which is the basis of the architectural concept.

== Bauhaus and German modernism ==
After Germany's defeat in World War I and the establishment of the Weimar Republic, a renewed liberal spirit allowed an upsurge of radical experimentation in all the arts, which had been suppressed by the old regime. Many Germans of left-wing views were influenced by the cultural experimentation that followed the Russian Revolution, such as constructivism. Such influences can be overstated: Gropius did not share these radical views, and said that Bauhaus was entirely apolitical. Just as important was the influence of the 19th-century English designer William Morris (1834–1896), who had argued that art should meet the needs of society and that there should be no distinction between form and function. Thus, the Bauhaus style, also known as the International Style, was marked by the absence of ornamentation and by harmony between the function of an object or a building and its design.

However, the most important influence on Bauhaus was modernism, a cultural movement whose origins lay as early as the 1880s, and which had already made its presence felt in Germany before the World War, despite the prevailing conservatism. The design innovations commonly associated with Gropius and the Bauhaus—the radically simplified forms, the rationality and functionality, and the idea that mass production was reconcilable with the individual artistic spirit—were already partly developed in Germany before the Bauhaus was founded. The German national designers' organization Deutscher Werkbund was formed in 1907 by Hermann Muthesius to harness the new potentials of mass production, with a mind towards preserving Germany's economic competitiveness with England. In its first seven years, the Werkbund came to be regarded as the authoritative body on questions of design in Germany, and was copied in other countries. Many fundamental questions of craftsmanship versus mass production, the relationship of usefulness and beauty, the practical purpose of formal beauty in a commonplace object, and whether or not a single proper form could exist, were argued out among its 1,870 members (by 1914).

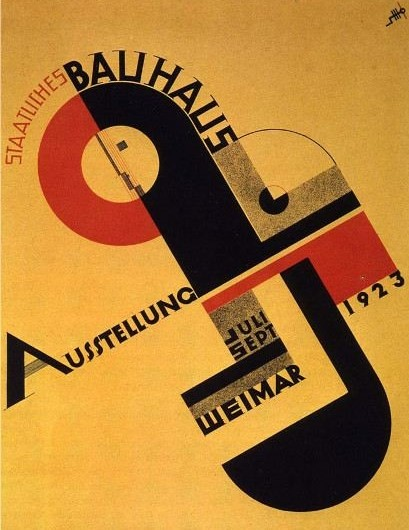
Poster for the Bauhausausstellung (1923)

German architectural modernism was known as Neues Bauen. Beginning in June 1907, Peter Behrens' pioneering industrial design work for the German electrical company AEG successfully integrated art and mass production on a large scale. He designed consumer products, standardized parts, created clean-lined designs for the company's graphics, developed a consistent corporate identity, built the modernist landmark AEG Turbine Factory, and made full use of newly developed materials such as poured concrete and exposed steel. Behrens was a founding member of the Werkbund, and both Walter Gropius and Adolf Meyer worked for him in this period.

The Bauhaus was founded at a time when the German zeitgeist had turned from emotional Expressionism to the matter-of-fact New Objectivity. An entire group of working architects, including Erich Mendelsohn, Bruno Taut and Hans Poelzig, turned away from fanciful experimentation and towards rational, functional, sometimes standardized building. Beyond the Bauhaus, many other significant German-speaking architects in the 1920s responded to the same aesthetic issues and material possibilities as the school. They also responded to the promise "to promote the object of assuring to every German a healthful habitation" written into the new Weimar Constitution (Article 155). Ernst May, Bruno Taut and Martin Wagner, among others, built large housing blocks in Frankfurt and Berlin. The acceptance of modernist design into everyday life was the subject of publicity campaigns, well-attended public exhibitions like the Weissenhof Estate, films, and sometimes fierce public debate.

=== Bauhaus and Vkhutemas ===
The Vkhutemas, the Russian state art and technical school founded in 1920 in Moscow, has been compared to Bauhaus. Founded a year after the Bauhaus school, Vkhutemas has close parallels to the German Bauhaus in its intent, organization and scope. The two schools were the first to train artist-designers in a modern manner. Both schools were state-sponsored initiatives to merge traditional craft with modern technology, with a basic course in aesthetic principles, courses in color theory, industrial design, and architecture. Vkhutemas was a larger school than the Bauhaus, but it was less publicised outside the Soviet Union and consequently, is less familiar in the West.

With the internationalism of modern architecture and design, there were many exchanges between the Vkhutemas and the Bauhaus. The second Bauhaus director Hannes Meyer attempted to organise an exchange between the two schools, while Hinnerk Scheper of the Bauhaus collaborated with various Vkhutein members on the use of colour in architecture. In addition, El Lissitzky's book Russia: an Architecture for World Revolution published in German in 1930 featured several illustrations of Vkhutemas/Vkhutein projects there.

== History of the Bauhaus ==
=== Weimar ===
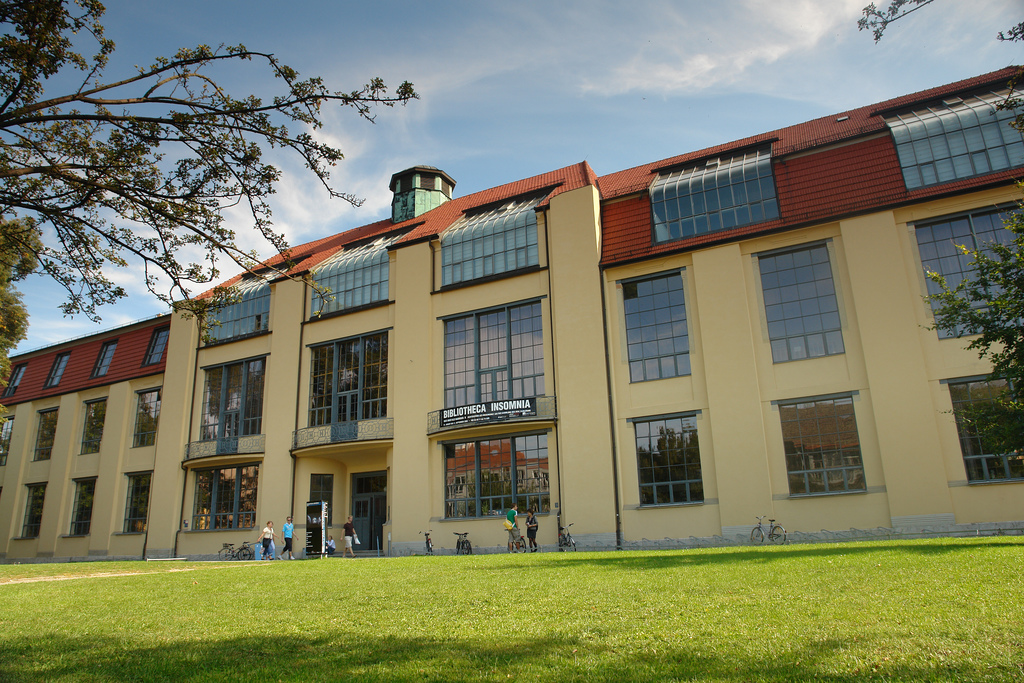
The main building of the Bauhaus-University Weimar. Built between 1904 and 1911 and designed by Henry van de Velde to house the sculptors' studio at the Grand Ducal Saxon Art School, it was designated a UNESCO World Heritage Site in 1996.

The school was founded by Walter Gropius in Weimar on 1 April 1919, as a merger of the Grand Ducal Saxon Academy of Fine Art and the Grand Ducal Saxon School of Arts and Crafts for a newly affiliated architecture department. Its roots lay in the arts and crafts school founded by the Grand Duke of Saxe-Weimar-Eisenach in 1906, and directed by Belgian Art Nouveau architect Henry van de Velde. When van de Velde was forced to resign in 1915 because he was Belgian, he suggested Gropius, Hermann Obrist, and August Endell as possible successors. In 1919, after delays caused by World War I and a lengthy debate over who should head the institution and the socio-economic meanings of a reconciliation of the fine arts and the applied arts (an issue which remained a defining one throughout the school's existence), Gropius was made the director of a new institution integrating the two called the Bauhaus. In the pamphlet for an April 1919 exhibition entitled Exhibition of Unknown Architects, Gropius, still very much under the influence of William Morris and the British Arts and Crafts Movement, proclaimed his goal as being "to create a new guild of craftsmen, without the class distinctions which raise an arrogant barrier between craftsman and artist." Gropius's neologism Bauhaus references both building and the Bauhütte, a premodern guild of stonemasons. The early intention was for the Bauhaus to be a combined architecture school, crafts school, and academy of the arts. Swiss painter Johannes Itten, German-American painter Lyonel Feininger, and German sculptor Gerhard Marcks, along with Gropius, comprised the faculty of the Bauhaus in 1919. By the following year their ranks had grown to include German painter, sculptor, and designer Oskar Schlemmer who headed the theatre workshop, and Swiss painter Paul Klee, joined in 1922 by Russian painter Wassily Kandinsky. The first major joint project completed by the Bauhaus was the Sommerfeld House, which was built between 1920 and 1921. A tumultuous year at the Bauhaus, 1922 also saw the move of Dutch painter Theo van Doesburg to Weimar to promote De Stijl ("The Style"), and a visit to the Bauhaus by Russian Constructivist artist and architect El Lissitzky.

From 1919 to 1922 the school was shaped by the pedagogical and aesthetic ideas of Johannes Itten, who taught the Vorkurs or "preliminary course" that was the introduction to the ideas of the Bauhaus. Itten was heavily influenced in his teaching by the ideas of Franz Cižek and Friedrich Wilhelm August Fröbel. He was also influenced in respect to aesthetics by the work of the Der Blaue Reiter group in Munich, as well as the work of Austrian Expressionist Oskar Kokoschka. The influence of German Expressionism favoured by Itten was analogous in some ways to the fine arts side of the ongoing debate. This influence culminated with the addition of Der Blaue Reiter founding member Wassily Kandinsky to the faculty and ended when Itten resigned in late 1923. Itten was replaced by the Hungarian designer László Moholy-Nagy, who rewrote the Vorkurs with a leaning towards the New Objectivity favoured by Gropius, which was analogous in some ways to the applied arts side of the debate. Although this shift was an important one, it did not represent a radical break from the past so much as a small step in a broader, more gradual socio-economic movement that had been going on at least since 1907, when van de Velde had argued for a craft basis for design while Hermann Muthesius had begun implementing industrial prototypes.

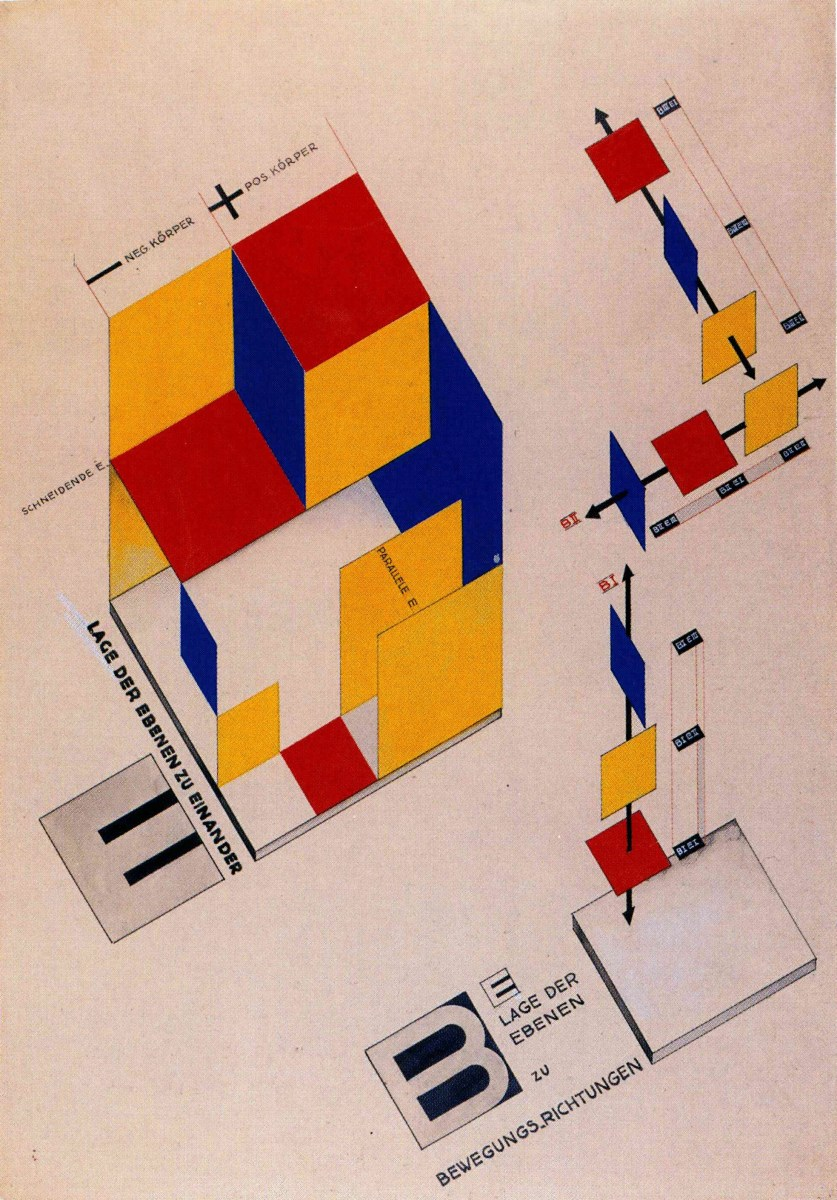
Mechanical Stage Design by Joost Schmidt, 1925

Gropius was not necessarily against Expressionism, and in the same 1919 pamphlet proclaiming this "new guild of craftsmen, without the class snobbery", described "painting and sculpture rising to heaven out of the hands of a million craftsmen, the crystal symbol of the new faith of the future." By 1923, however, Gropius was no longer evoking images of soaring Romanesque cathedrals and the craft-driven aesthetic of the "Völkisch movement", instead declaring "we want an architecture adapted to our world of machines, radios and fast cars." Gropius argued that a new period of history had begun with the end of the war. He wanted to create a new architectural style to reflect this new era. His style in architecture and consumer goods was to be functional, cheap and consistent with mass production. To these ends, Gropius wanted to reunite art and craft to arrive at high-end functional products with artistic merit. The Bauhaus issued a magazine called Bauhaus and a series of books called "Bauhausbücher". Since the Weimar Republic lacked the number of raw materials available to the United States and Great Britain, it had to rely on the proficiency of a skilled labour force and an ability to export innovative and high-quality goods. Therefore, designers were needed and so was a new type of art education. The school's philosophy stated that the artist should be trained to work with the industry.

Weimar was in the German state of Thuringia, and the Bauhaus school received state support from the Social Democrat-controlled Thuringian state government. The school in Weimar experienced political pressure from conservative circles in Thuringian politics, increasingly so after 1923 as political tension rose. One condition placed on the Bauhaus in this new political environment was the exhibition of work undertaken at the school. This condition was met in 1923 with the Bauhaus' exhibition of the experimental Haus am Horn. The Social Democrats lost their majority in the 1924 state election, and the new conservative Ministry of Education placed the staff on six-month contracts and cut the school's funding in half. The Bauhaus issued a press release on 26 December 1924, setting the closure of the school for the end of March 1925. At this point it had already been looking for alternative sources of funding. After the Bauhaus moved to Dessau, a school of industrial design with teachers and staff less antagonistic to the conservative political regime remained in Weimar. This school was eventually known as the Technical University of Architecture and Civil Engineering, and in 1996 changed its name to Bauhaus-University Weimar.

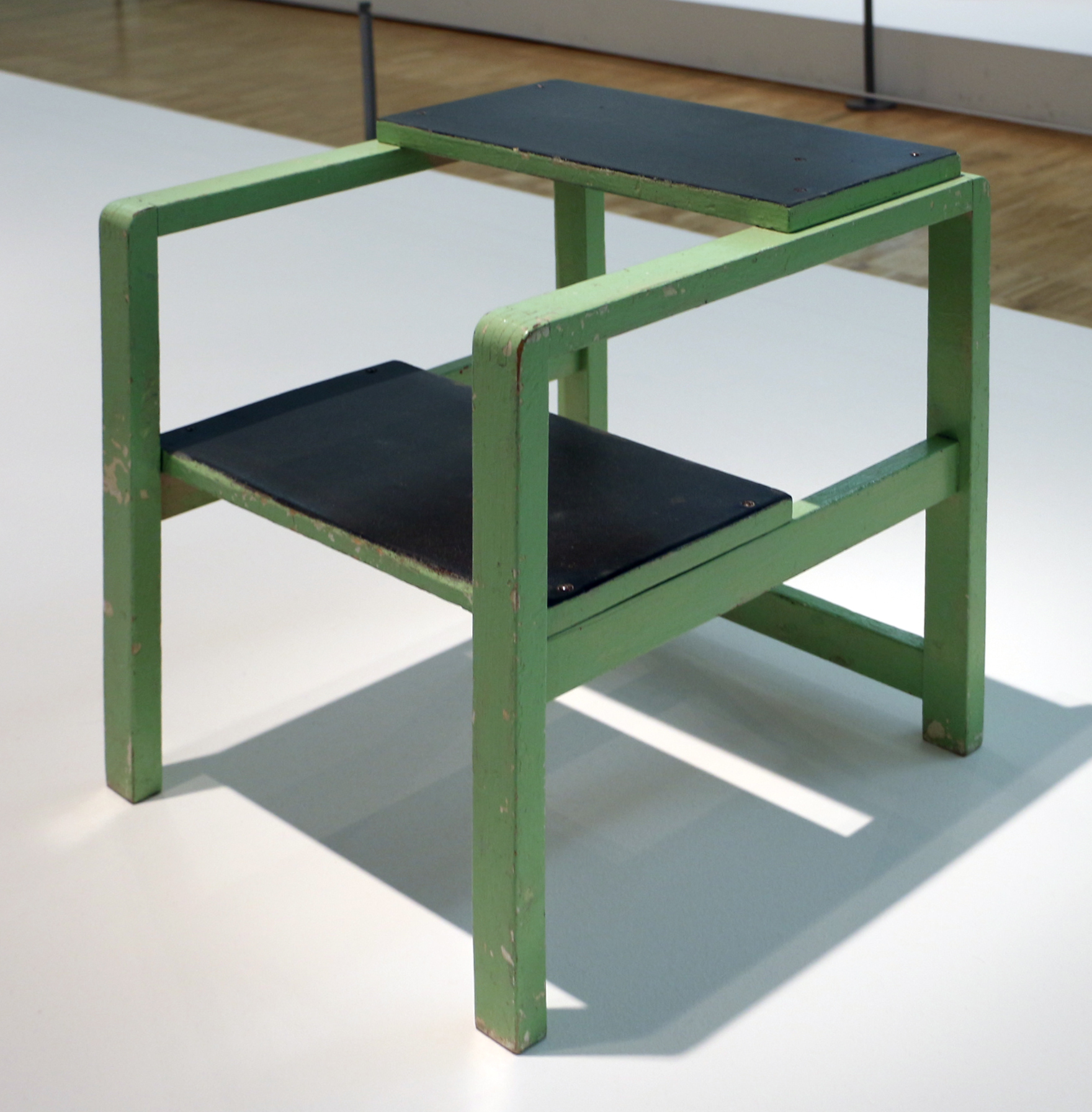
Children's staircase by Erich Dieckmann (furniture designer), 1925

=== Dessau ===
The Bauhaus moved to Dessau in 1925 and new facilities there were inaugurated in late 1926. Gropius's design for the Dessau facilities was a return to the futuristic Gropius of 1914 that had more in common with the International style lines of the Fagus Factory than the stripped down Neo-classical of the Werkbund pavilion or the Völkisch Sommerfeld House. During the Dessau years, there was a remarkable change in direction for the school. According to Elaine Hoffman, Gropius had approached the Dutch architect Mart Stam to run the newly founded architecture program, and when Stam declined the position, Gropius turned to Stam's friend and colleague in the ABC group, Hannes Meyer.

Meyer became director when Gropius resigned in February 1928, and brought the Bauhaus its two most significant building commissions, both of which still exist: five apartment buildings in the city of Dessau, and the Bundesschule des Allgemeinen Deutschen Gewerkschaftsbundes (ADGB Trade Union School) in Bernau bei Berlin. Meyer favoured measurements and calculations in his presentations to clients, along with the use of off-the-shelf architectural components to reduce costs. This approach proved attractive to potential clients. The school turned its first profit under his leadership in 1929.

But Meyer also generated a great deal of conflict. As a radical functionalist, he had no patience with the aesthetic program and forced the resignations of Herbert Bayer, Marcel Breuer, and other long-time instructors. Even though Meyer shifted the orientation of the school further to the left than it had been under Gropius, he didn't want the school to become a tool of left-wing party politics. He prevented the formation of a student communist cell, and in the increasingly dangerous political atmosphere, this became a threat to the existence of the Dessau school. Dessau mayor Fritz Hesse fired him in the summer of 1930. The Dessau city council attempted to convince Gropius to return as head of the school, but Gropius instead suggested Ludwig Mies van der Rohe. Mies was appointed in 1930 and immediately interviewed each student, dismissing those that he deemed uncommitted. He halted the school's manufacture of goods so that the school could focus on teaching, and appointed no new faculty other than his close confidant Lilly Reich. By 1931, the Nazi Party was becoming more influential in German politics, and won a majority on the Dessau city council. The following year, it moved to close the school; only four Communists and Hesse dissented.

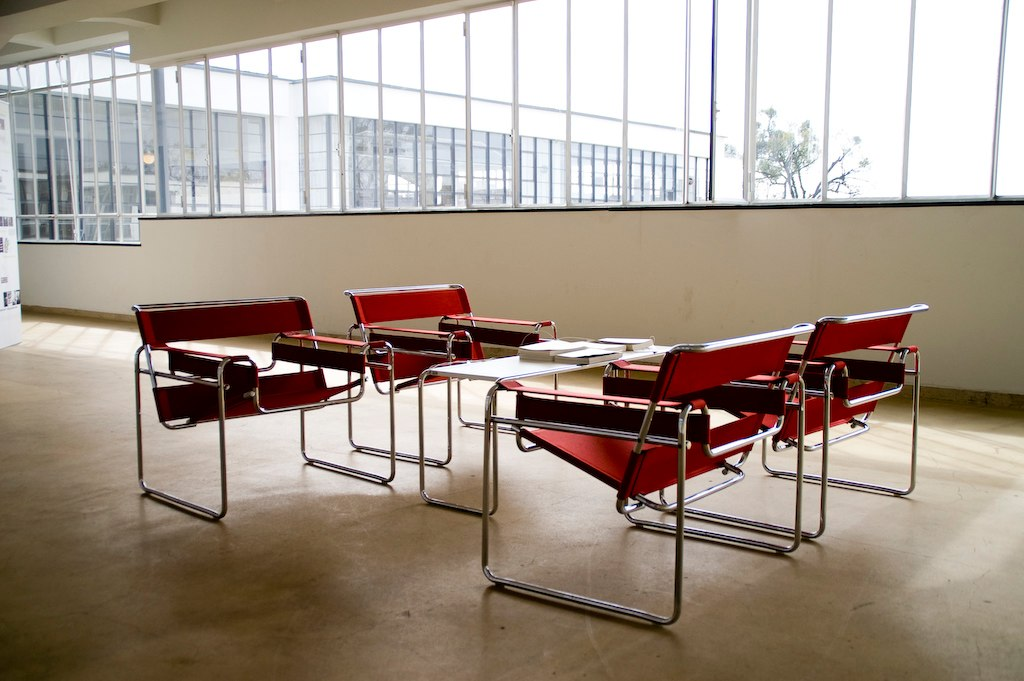
Wassily Chairs by Marcel Breuer (1925–1926)

=== Berlin ===
In late 1932, Mies rented a derelict factory in Berlin (Birkbusch Street 49) to use as the new Bauhaus with his own money. The students and faculty rehabilitated the building, painting the interior white. The school operated for ten months without further interference from the Nazi Party. In 1933, the Gestapo closed down the Berlin school. Mies protested the decision, eventually speaking to the head of the Gestapo, who agreed to allow the school to re-open. However, shortly after receiving a letter permitting the opening of the Bauhaus, Mies and the other faculty agreed to voluntarily shut down the school.

Although neither the Nazi Party nor Adolf Hitler had a cohesive architectural policy before they came to power in 1933, Nazi writers like Wilhelm Frick and Alfred Rosenberg had already labelled the Bauhaus "un-German" and criticized its modernist styles, deliberately generating public controversy over issues like flat roofs. Increasingly through the early 1930s, they characterized the Bauhaus as a front for communists and social liberals. Indeed, when Meyer was fired in 1930, a number of communist students loyal to him moved to the Soviet Union.

Even before the Nazis came to power, political pressure on Bauhaus had increased. The Nazi movement, from nearly the start, denounced the Bauhaus for its "degenerate art", and the Nazi regime was determined to crack down on what it saw as the foreign, probably Jewish, influences of "cosmopolitan modernism". Despite Gropius's protestations that as a war veteran and a patriot his work had no subversive political intent, the Berlin Bauhaus was pressured to close in April 1933.

Under the Nazi regime, about twenty Bauhauslers are known to have been killed in prison or concentration camps. Some emigrated, while others adapted and participated in propaganda exhibitions and design fairs, produced photographic and graphic works such as magazine covers, movie posters, and designed furniture, carpets, household objects and even busts of Hitler. Of 119 teaching staff c. 15 emigrated between 1933 and 1938. Of the c. 1,250 students who were enrolled when Hitler came to power in 1933, approximately 900 are thought to have remained in Germany. Of those, 188 joined the National Socialist Party (170 men and 18 women), 14 were part of the brown shirts, 12 joined the SS, and one was involved in the design of the crematoria at Auschwitz.

Mies emigrated to the United States to assume the directorship of the School of Architecture at the Armour Institute (now Illinois Institute of Technology) in Chicago, and to seek building commissions.^{[a]} The simple engineering-oriented functionalism of stripped-down modernism, however, did lead to some Bauhaus influences living on in Nazi Germany. When Hitler's chief engineer, Fritz Todt, began opening the new autobahns (highways) in 1935, many of the bridges and service stations were "bold examples of modernism", and among those submitting designs was Mies van der Rohe. Emigrants did succeed, however, in spreading the concepts of the Bauhaus to other countries, including the "New Bauhaus" of Chicago:

== Architectural output ==
The paradox of the early Bauhaus was that, although its manifesto proclaimed that the aim of all creative activity was building, the school did not offer classes in architecture until 1927. During the years under Gropius (1919–1927), he and his partner Adolf Meyer observed no real distinction between the output of his architectural office and the school. The built output of Bauhaus architecture in these years is the output of Gropius: the Sommerfeld house in Berlin, the Otte house in Berlin, the Auerbach house in Jena, and the competition design for the Chicago Tribune Tower, which brought the school much attention. The definitive 1926 Bauhaus building in Dessau is also attributed to Gropius. Apart from contributions to the 1923 Haus am Horn, student architectural work amounted to un-built projects, interior finishes, and craft work like cabinets, chairs and pottery.

In the next two years under Meyer, the architectural focus shifted away from aesthetics and towards functionality. There were major commissions: one from the city of Dessau for five tightly designed "Laubenganghäuser" (apartment buildings with balcony access), which are still in use today, and another for the Bundesschule des Allgemeinen Deutschen Gewerkschaftsbundes (ADGB Trade Union School) in Bernau bei Berlin. Meyer's approach was to research users' needs and scientifically develop the design solution. He intended to place emphasis on Gropius' objective analysis of the properties determining an object's use value, known as Wesensforschung. Gropius believed that it was possible to design exemplary products of universal validity that should be standardized.

Mies van der Rohe repudiated Meyer's politics, his supporters, and his architectural approach. As opposed to Gropius's "study of essentials", and Meyer's research into user requirements, Mies advocated a "spatial implementation of intellectual decisions", which effectively meant an adoption of his own aesthetics. Neither Mies van der Rohe nor his Bauhaus students saw any projects built during the 1930s.

The Bauhaus movement was not focused on developing worker housing. Only two projects, the apartment building project in Dessau and the Törten row housing fall into the worker housing category. It was the Bauhaus contemporaries Bruno Taut, Hans Poelzig and particularly Ernst May, as the city architects of Berlin, Dresden and Frankfurt respectively, who are rightfully credited with the thousands of socially progressive housing units built in Weimar Germany. The housing Taut built in south-west Berlin during the 1920s, close to the U-Bahn stop Onkel Toms Hütte, is still occupied.

== Impact ==
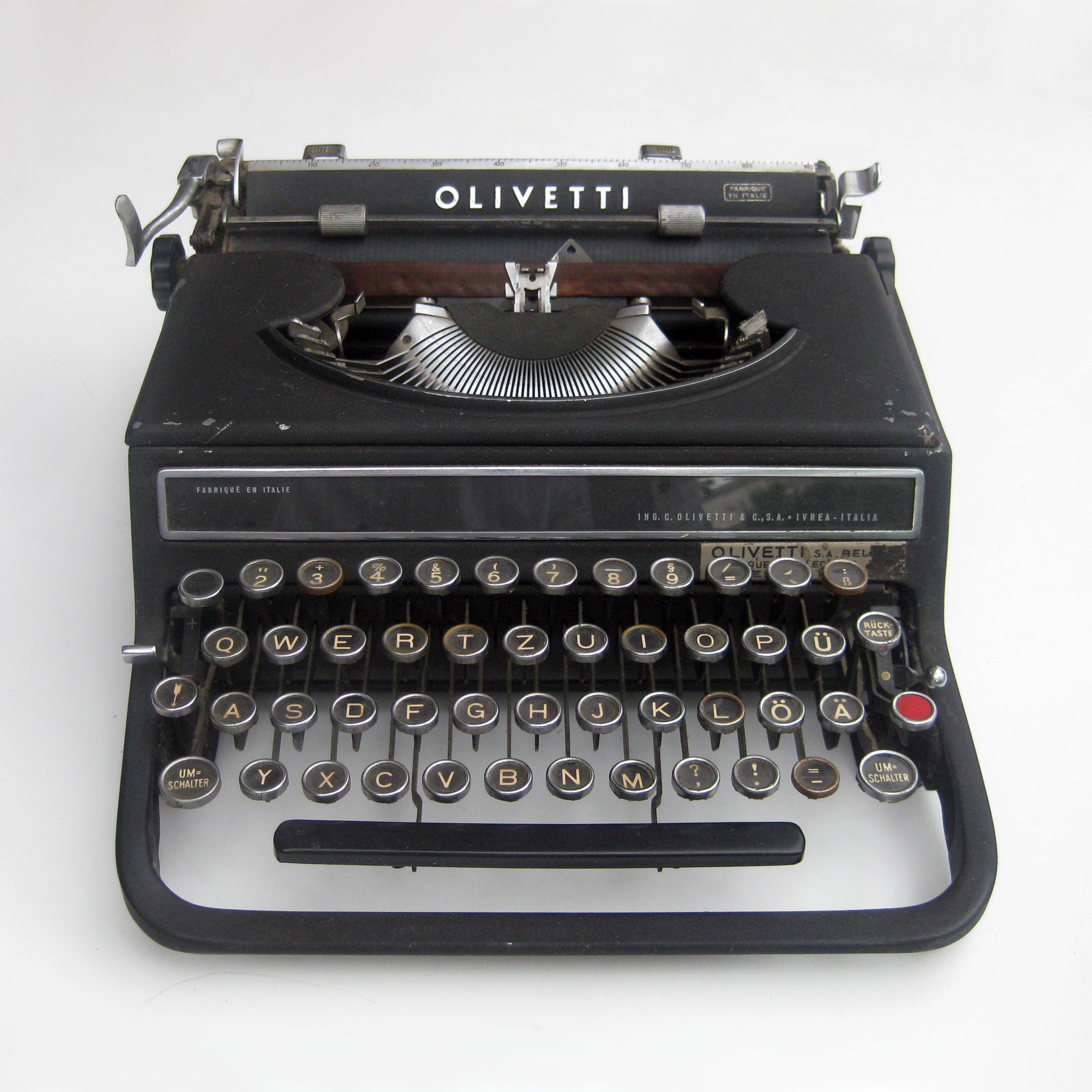
An Olivetti Studio 42 typewriter, designed by Bauhausler Xanti Schawinsky in 1936

The Bauhaus had a major impact on art and architecture trends in Western Europe, Canada, the United States and Israel in the decades following its demise, as many of the artists involved fled, or were exiled by the Nazi regime. In 1996, four of the major sites associated with Bauhaus in Germany were inscribed on the UNESCO World Heritage List (with two more added in 2017).

In 1928, the Hungarian painter Alexander Bortnyik founded a school of design in Budapest called Műhely, which means "the studio". Located on the seventh floor of a house on Nagymezo Street, it was meant to be the Hungarian equivalent to the Bauhaus. The literature sometimes refers to it—in an oversimplified manner—as "the Budapest Bauhaus". Bortnyik was a great admirer of László Moholy-Nagy and had met Walter Gropius in Weimar between 1923 and 1925. Moholy-Nagy himself taught at the Műhely. Victor Vasarely, a pioneer of op art, studied at this school before establishing in Paris in 1930.

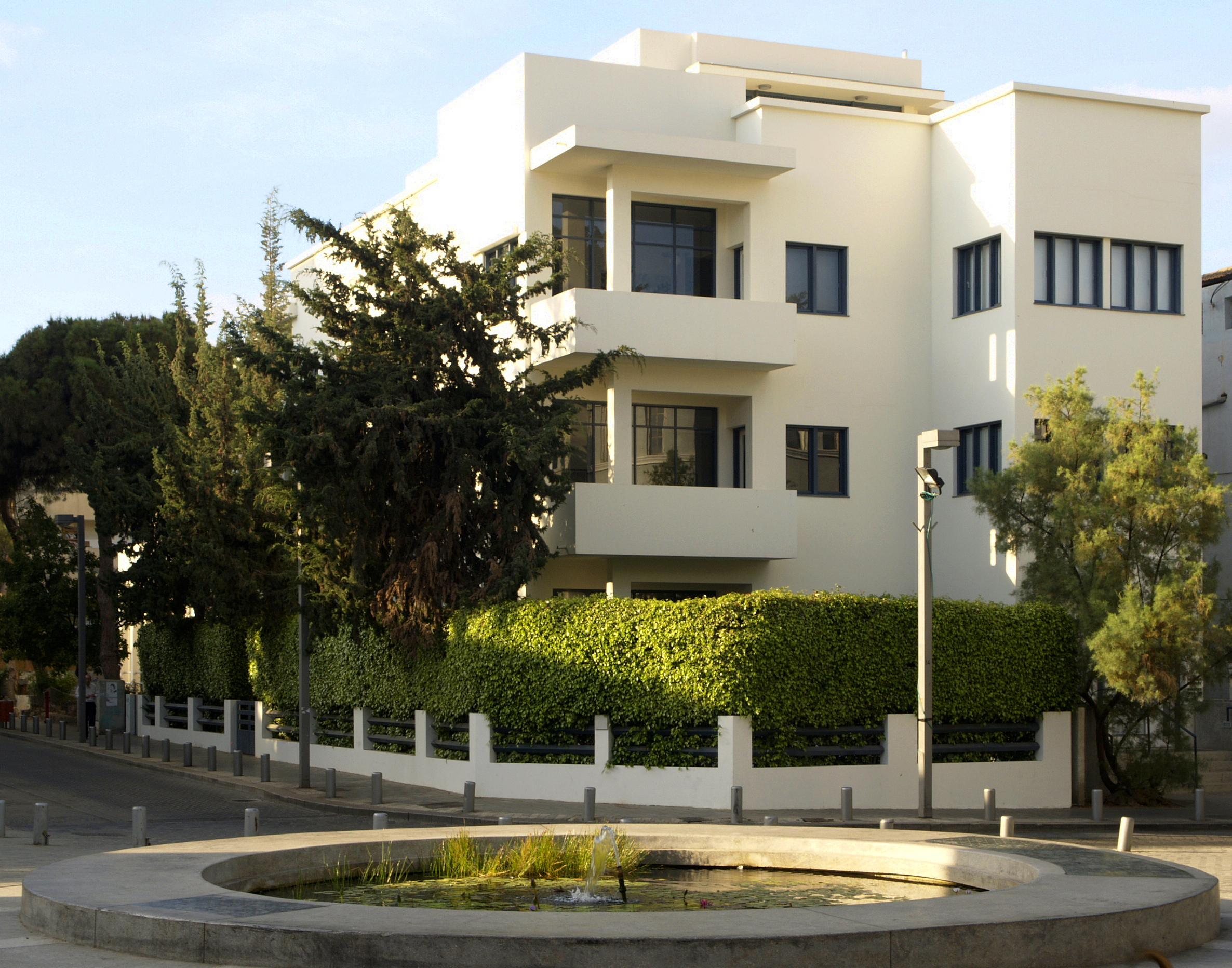
Bauhaus Foundation, Tel Aviv

Walter Gropius, Marcel Breuer, and Moholy-Nagy re-assembled in Britain during the mid-1930s and lived and worked in the Isokon housing development in Lawn Road in London before the war caught up with them. Gropius and Breuer went on to teach at the Harvard Graduate School of Design and worked together before their professional split. Their collaboration produced, among other projects, the Aluminum City Terrace in New Kensington, Pennsylvania and the Alan I W Frank House in Pittsburgh. The Harvard School was enormously influential in America in the late 1920s and early 1930s, producing such students as Philip Johnson, I. M. Pei, Lawrence Halprin and Paul Rudolph, among many others.

In the late 1930s, Mies van der Rohe re-settled in Chicago, enjoyed the sponsorship of the influential Philip Johnson, and became one of the world's pre-eminent architects. Moholy-Nagy also went to Chicago and founded the New Bauhaus school under the sponsorship of industrialist and philanthropist Walter Paepcke. This school became the Institute of Design, part of the Illinois Institute of Technology. Printmaker and painter Werner Drewes was also largely responsible for bringing the Bauhaus aesthetic to America and taught at both Columbia University and Washington University in St. Louis. Herbert Bayer, sponsored by Paepcke, moved to Aspen, Colorado in support of Paepcke's Aspen projects at the Aspen Institute. In 1953, Max Bill, together with Inge Aicher-Scholl and Otl Aicher, founded the Ulm School of Design (German: Hochschule für Gestaltung – HfG Ulm) in Ulm, Germany, a design school in the tradition of the Bauhaus. The school is notable for its inclusion of semiotics as a field of study. The school closed in 1968, but the "Ulm Model" concept continues to influence international design education. Another series of projects at the school were the Bauhaus typefaces, mostly realized in the decades afterward.

The influence of the Bauhaus on design education was significant. One of the main objectives of the Bauhaus was to unify art, craft, and technology, and this approach was incorporated into the curriculum of the Bauhaus. The structure of the Bauhaus Vorkurs (preliminary course) reflected a pragmatic approach to integrating theory and application. In their first year, students learnt the basic elements and principles of design and colour theory, and experimented with a range of materials and processes. This approach to design education became a common feature of architectural and design school in many countries. For example, the Shillito Design School in Sydney stands as a unique link between Australia and the Bauhaus. The colour and design syllabus of the Shillito Design School was firmly underpinned by the theories and ideologies of the Bauhaus. Its first year foundational course mimicked the Vorkurs and focused on the elements and principles of design plus colour theory and application. The founder of the school, Phyllis Shillito, which opened in 1962 and closed in 1980, firmly believed that "A student who has mastered the basic principles of design, can design anything from a dress to a kitchen stove". In Britain, largely under the influence of painter and teacher William Johnstone, Basic Design, a Bauhaus-influenced art foundation course, was introduced at Camberwell School of Art and the Central School of Art and Design, whence it spread to all art schools in the country, becoming universal by the early 1960s.

One of the most important contributions of the Bauhaus is in the field of modern furniture design. The characteristic Cantilever chair and Wassily Chair designed by Marcel Breuer are two examples. (Breuer eventually lost a legal battle in Germany with Dutch architect/designer Mart Stam over patent rights to the cantilever chair design. Although Stam had worked on the design of the Bauhaus's 1923 exhibit in Weimar, and guest-lectured at the Bauhaus later in the 1920s, he was not formally associated with the school, and he and Breuer had worked independently on the cantilever concept, leading to the patent dispute.) The most profitable product of the Bauhaus was its wallpaper.

The physical plant at Dessau survived World War II and was operated as a design school with some architectural facilities by the German Democratic Republic. This included live stage productions in the Bauhaus theater under the name of Bauhausbühne ("Bauhaus Stage"). After German reunification, a reorganized school continued in the same building, with no essential continuity with the Bauhaus under Gropius in the early 1920s. In 1979 Bauhaus-Dessau College started to organize postgraduate programs with participants from all over the world. This effort has been supported by the Bauhaus-Dessau Foundation which was founded in 1974 as a public institution.

Later evaluation of the Bauhaus design credo was critical of its flawed recognition of the human element, an acknowledgment of "the dated, unattractive aspects of the Bauhaus as a projection of utopia marked by mechanistic views of human nature…Home hygiene without home atmosphere."

Subsequent examples which have continued the philosophy of the Bauhaus include Black Mountain College, Hochschule für Gestaltung in Ulm and Domaine de Boisbuchet.

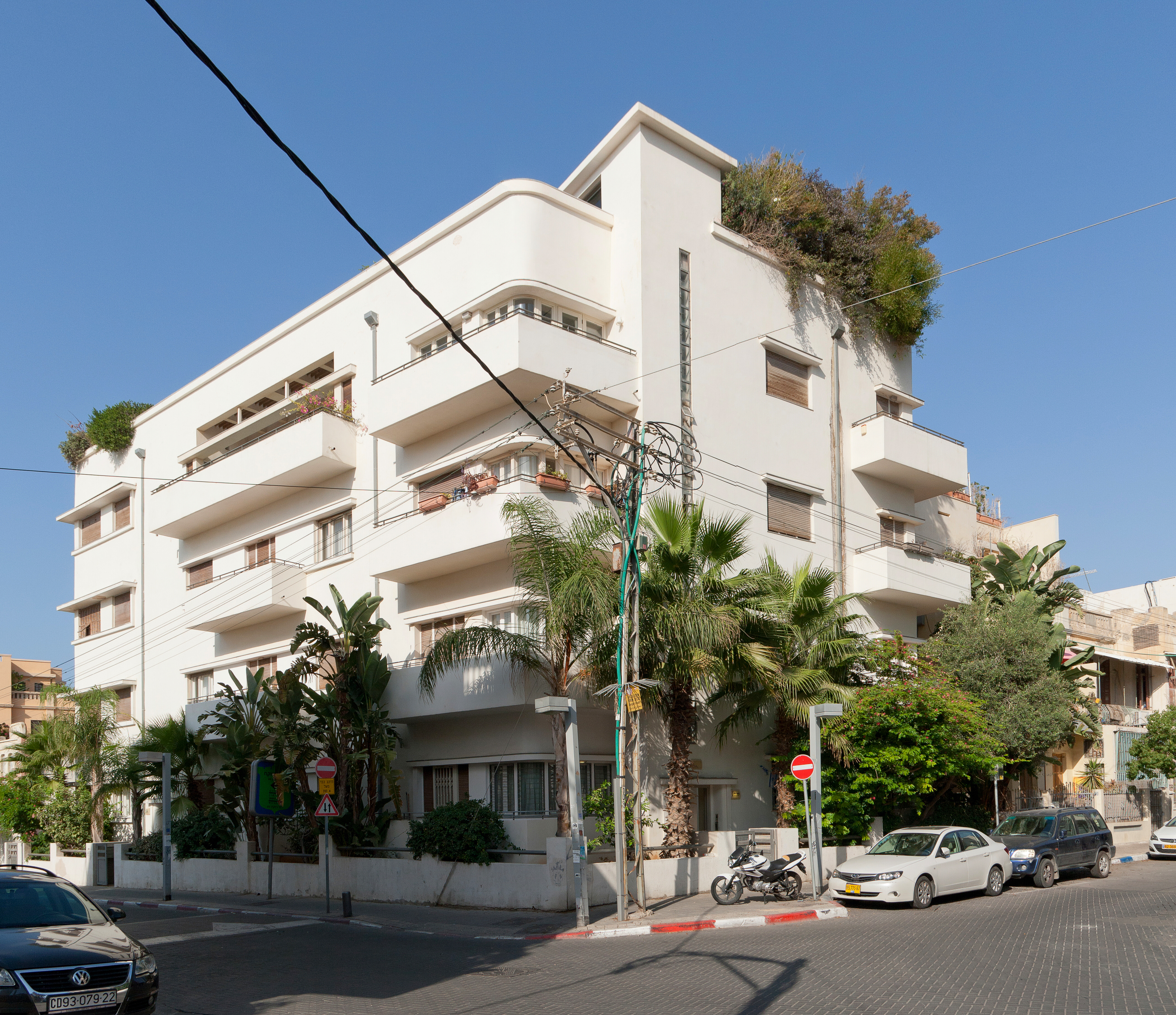
A Bauhaus-style building with "thermometer" windows on Pines Street in Tel Aviv

=== The White City ===
The White City (Hebrew: העיר הלבנה), refers to a collection of over 4,000 buildings built in the Bauhaus or International Style in Tel Aviv from the 1930s by German Jewish architects who emigrated to the British Mandate of Palestine after the rise of the Nazis. Tel Aviv has the largest number of buildings in the Bauhaus/International Style of any city in the world. Preservation, documentation, and exhibitions have brought attention to Tel Aviv's collection of 1930s architecture. In 2003, the United Nations Educational, Scientific and Cultural Organization (UNESCO) proclaimed Tel Aviv's White City a World Cultural Heritage site, as "an outstanding example of new town planning and architecture in the early 20th century." The citation recognized the unique adaptation of modern international architectural trends to the cultural, climatic, and local traditions of the city. Bauhaus Center Tel Aviv organizes regular architectural tours of the city, and the Bauhaus Foundation offers Bauhaus exhibits.

=== Sotsmisto in Zaporizhzhia ===
Sotsmisto, a residential neighborhood built in 1930s in Zaporizhzhia, Ukraine, was strongly influenced by Bauhaus. This neighborhood was among the first Soviet projects of a functional part of a modernized industrial city, and demonstrates the impact of Bauhaus on the development of early Soviet architecture as a whole.

=== Centenary ===
As the centenary of the founding of Bauhaus, several events, festivals, and exhibitions were held around the world in 2019. The international opening festival at the Berlin Academy of the Arts from 16 to 24 January concentrated on "the presentation and production of pieces by contemporary artists, in which the aesthetic issues and experimental configurations of the Bauhaus artists continue to be inspiringly contagious". Original Bauhaus, The Centenary Exhibition, shown at the Berlinische Galerie from 6 September 2019 to 27 January 2020, presented over 1,000 original works from the Bauhaus-Archiv / Museum für Gestaltung. The acclaimed exhibition explored the Bauhaus history and enduring legacy through 14 key objects and case studies. It was accompanied by a comprehensive marketing campaign that positioned the Bauhaus as a living reference, translating its ideas into contemporary fashion, content, and everyday life, and reaching a wide international audience. With more than 130,000 visitors, it became the most successful exhibition in the history of both the Bauhaus-Archiv and the Berlinische Galerie. The Bauhaus Museum Dessau also opened in September 2019, operated by the Bauhaus Dessau Foundation and funded by the State of Saxony-Anhalt and the German Federal government. It is set to be the permanent home of the second-largest Bauhaus collection at 49,000 objects, while paying homage to its strong influence in the city when the Bauhaus arrived in 1925.

In 2024, the German far-right party Alternative for Germany (AfD) sought to attack celebrations of the Bauhaus because of their view that the Bauhaus did not follow tradition. The Bauhaus was also crushed by the Nazis before World War II, and according to political scientist Jan-Werner Mueller, AfD's condemnation seeks to use it in a culture war of far right-wing provocation.

=== The New European Bauhaus ===
In September 2020, President of the European Commission Ursula von der Leyen introduced the New European Bauhaus (NEB) initiative during her State of the Union address. The NEB is a creative and interdisciplinary movement that connects the European Green Deal to everyday life. It is a platform for experimentation aiming to unite citizens, experts, businesses and institutions in imagining and designing a sustainable, aesthetic and inclusive future.

Sport and physical activity were an essential part of the original Bauhaus approach. Hannes Meyer, the second director of Bauhaus Dessau, ensured that one day a week was solely devoted to sport and gymnastics. 1 In 1930, Meyer employed two physical education teachers. The Bauhaus school even applied for public funds to enhance its playing field. The inclusion of sport and physical activity in the Bauhaus curriculum had various purposes. First, as Meyer put it, sport combatted a "one-sided emphasis on brainwork." In addition, Bauhaus instructors believed that students could better express themselves if they actively experienced the space, rhythms and movements of the body. The Bauhaus approach also considered physical activity an important contributor to wellbeing and community spirit. Sport and physical activity were essential to the interdisciplinary Bauhaus movement that developed revolutionary ideas and continues to shape our environments today.

== Bauhaus staff and students ==
People who were educated, or who taught or worked in other capacities, at the Bauhaus.

== Gallery ==
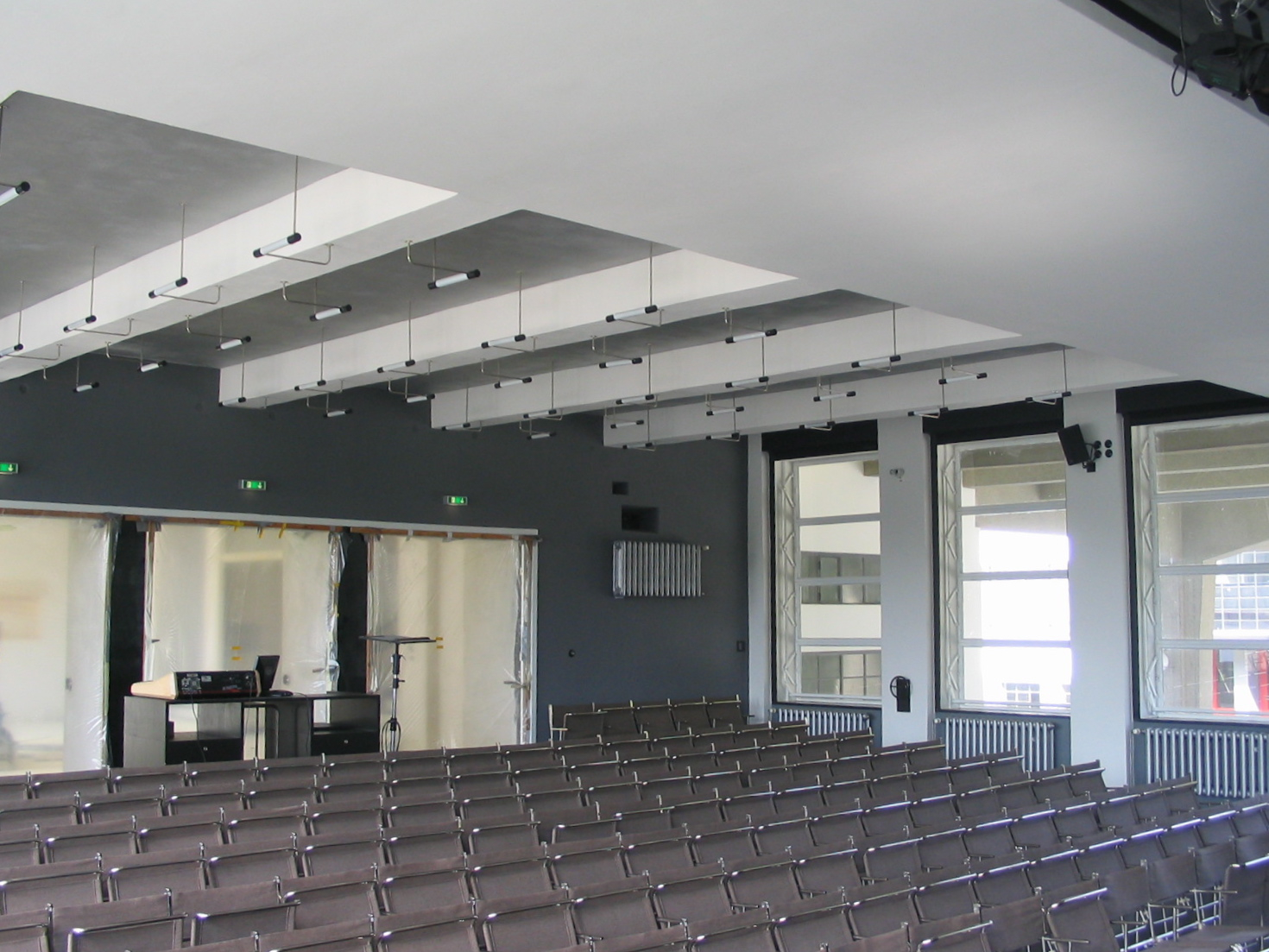
A stage in the Festsaal, Dessau

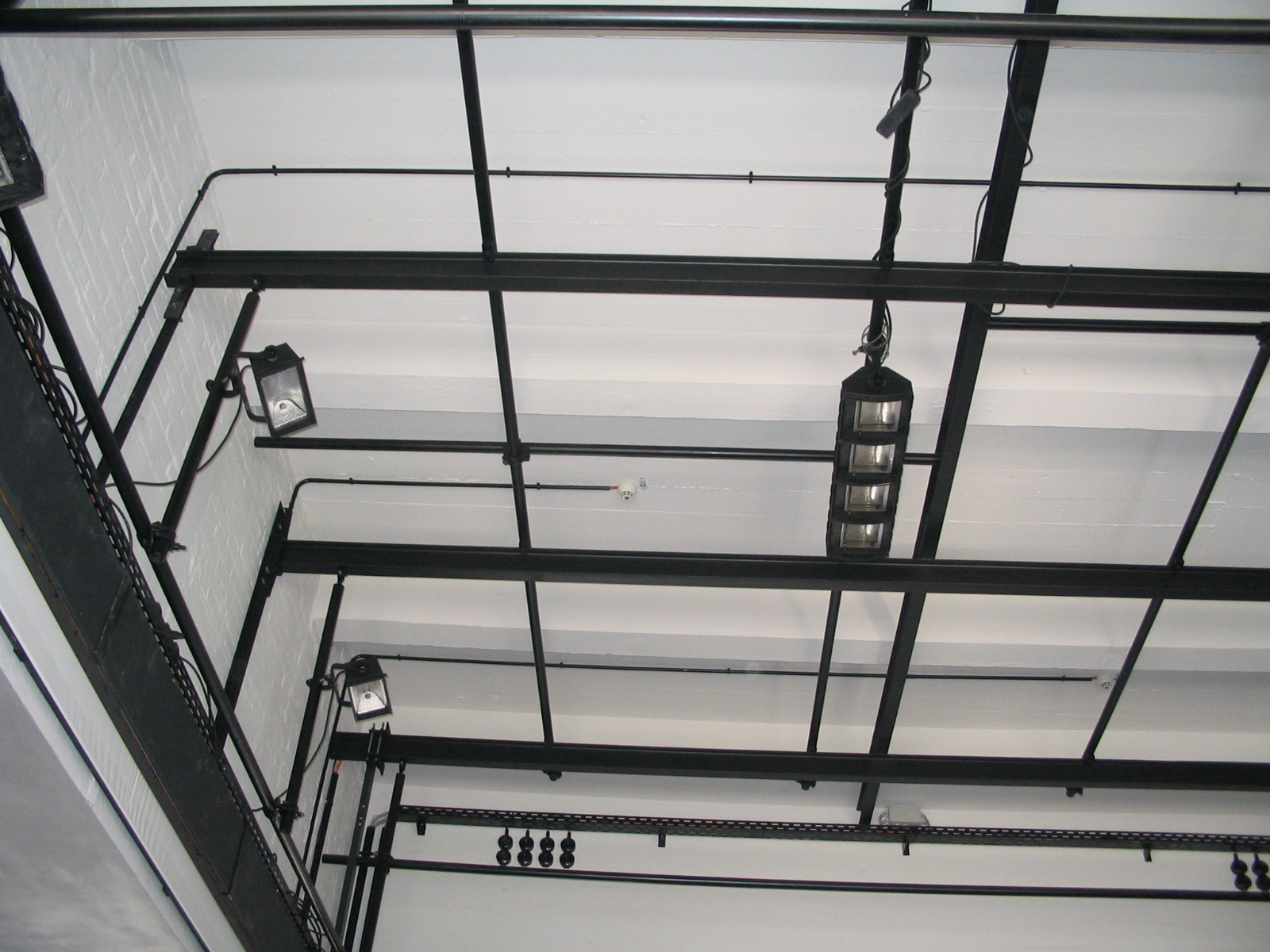
Ceiling with light fixtures for stage in the Festsaal, Dessau

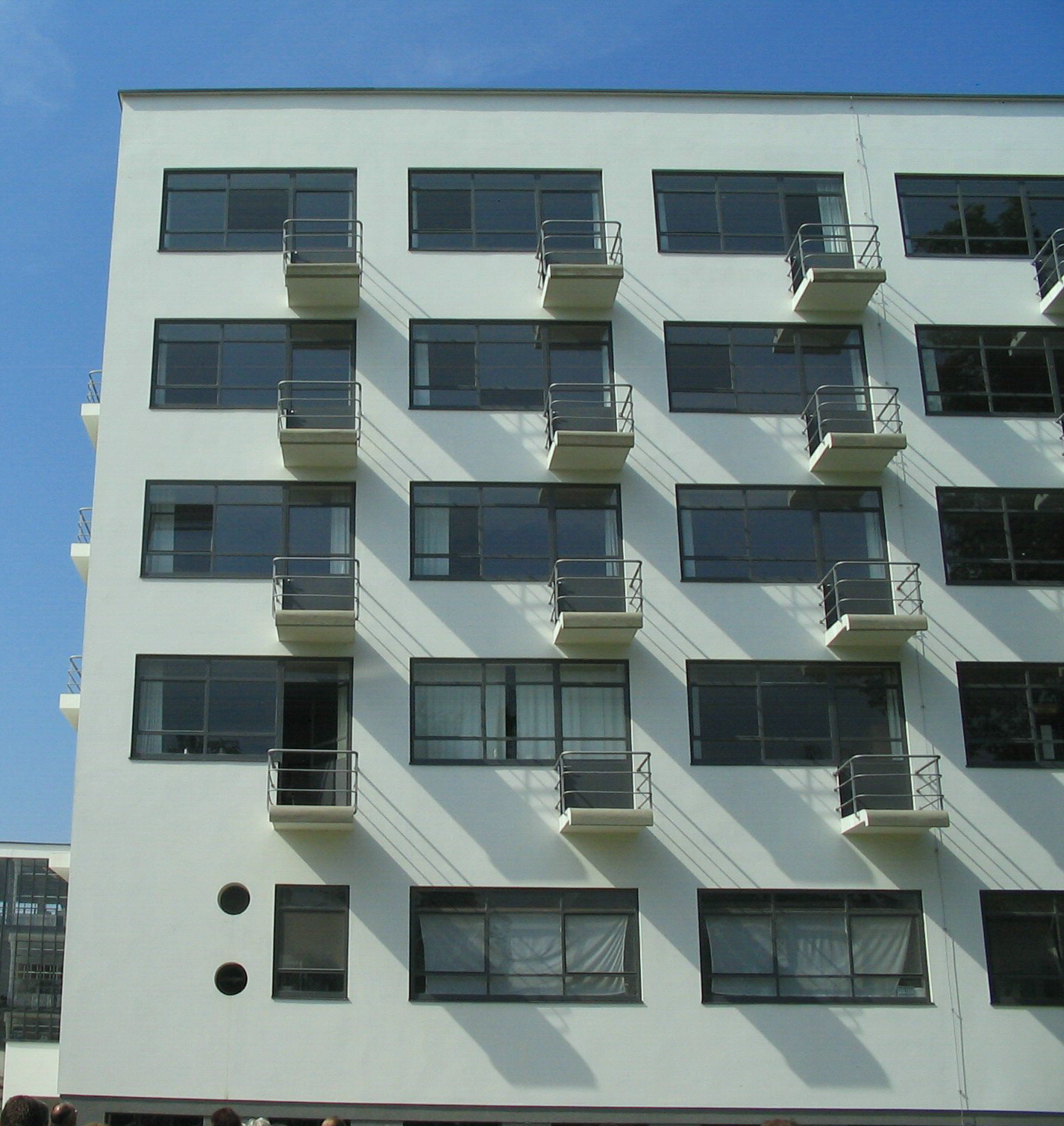
Dormitory balconies in the residence, Dessau

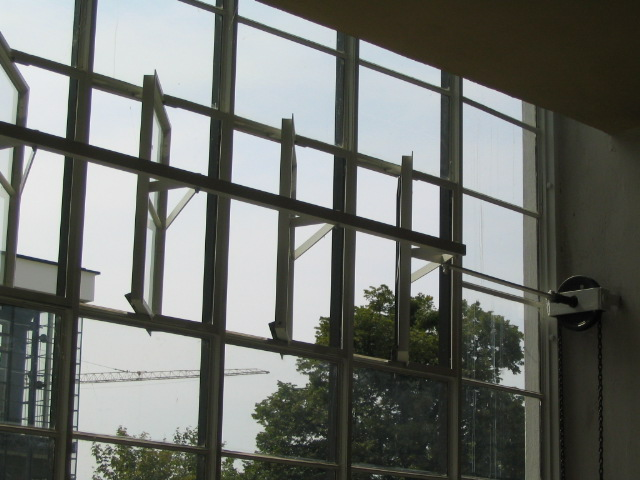
Mechanically opened windows, Dessau

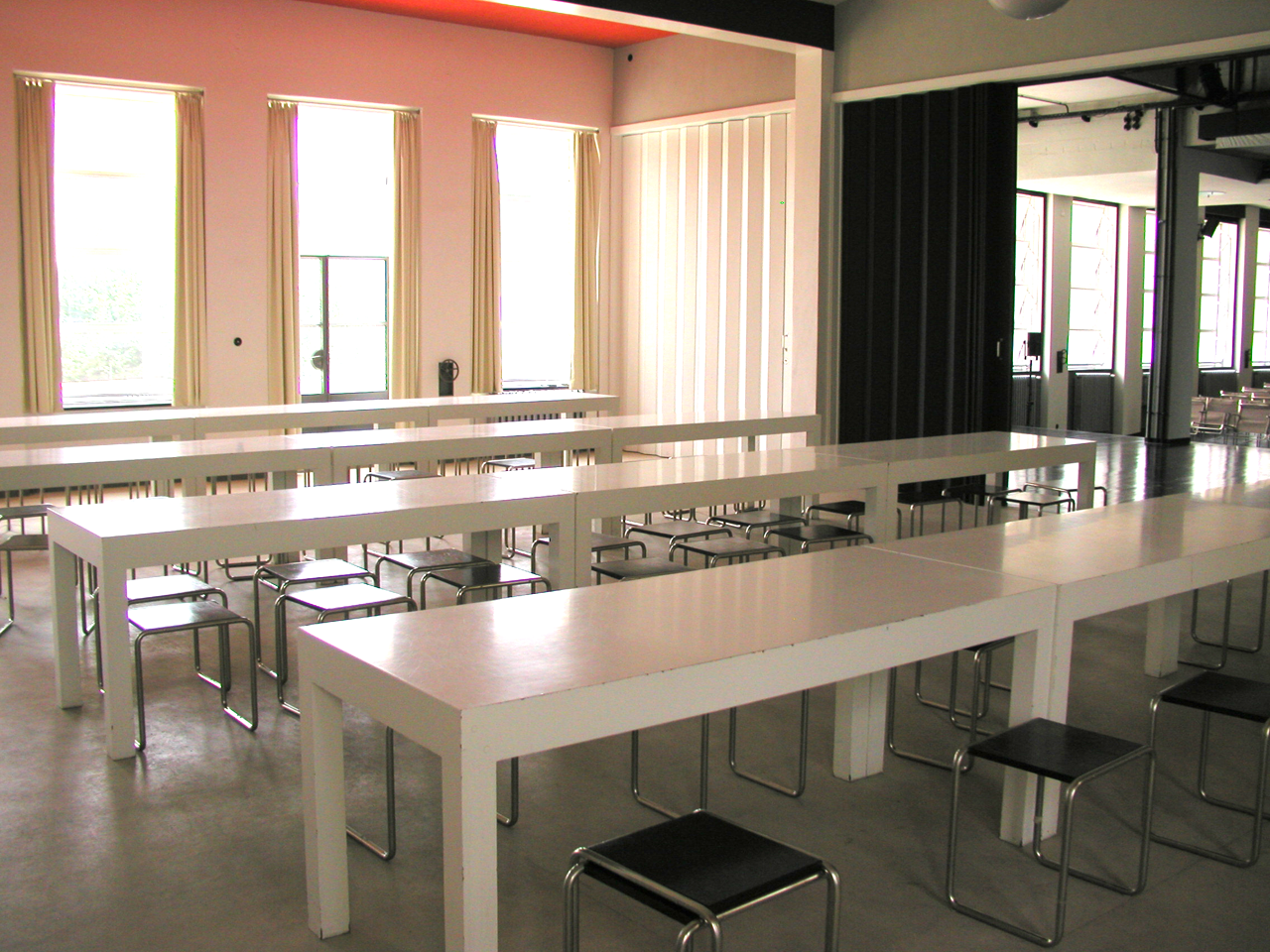
The Mensa (cafeteria), Dessau

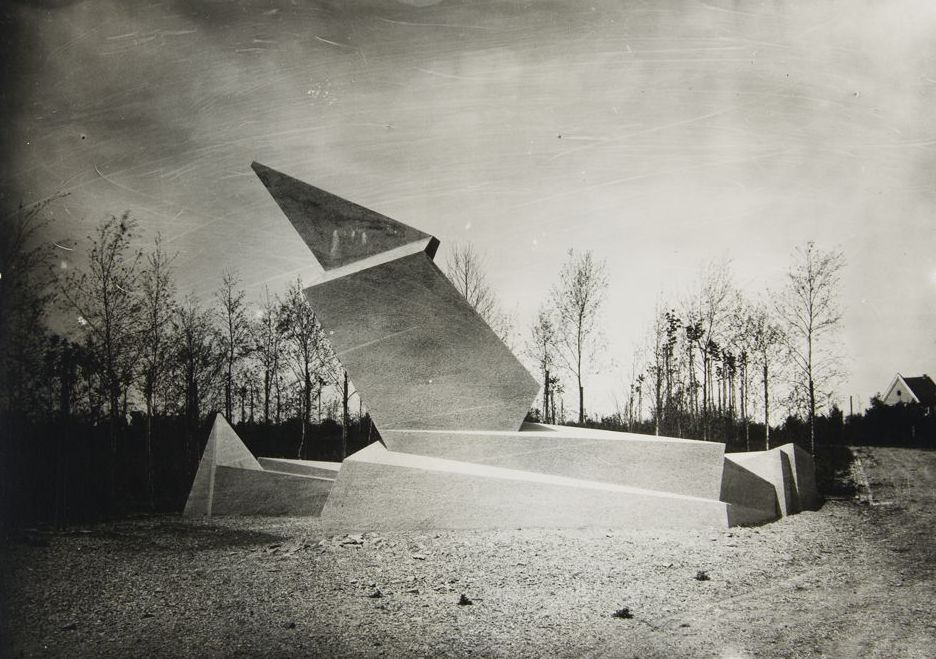
Gropius' Expressionist Monument to the March Dead (1921–1922)

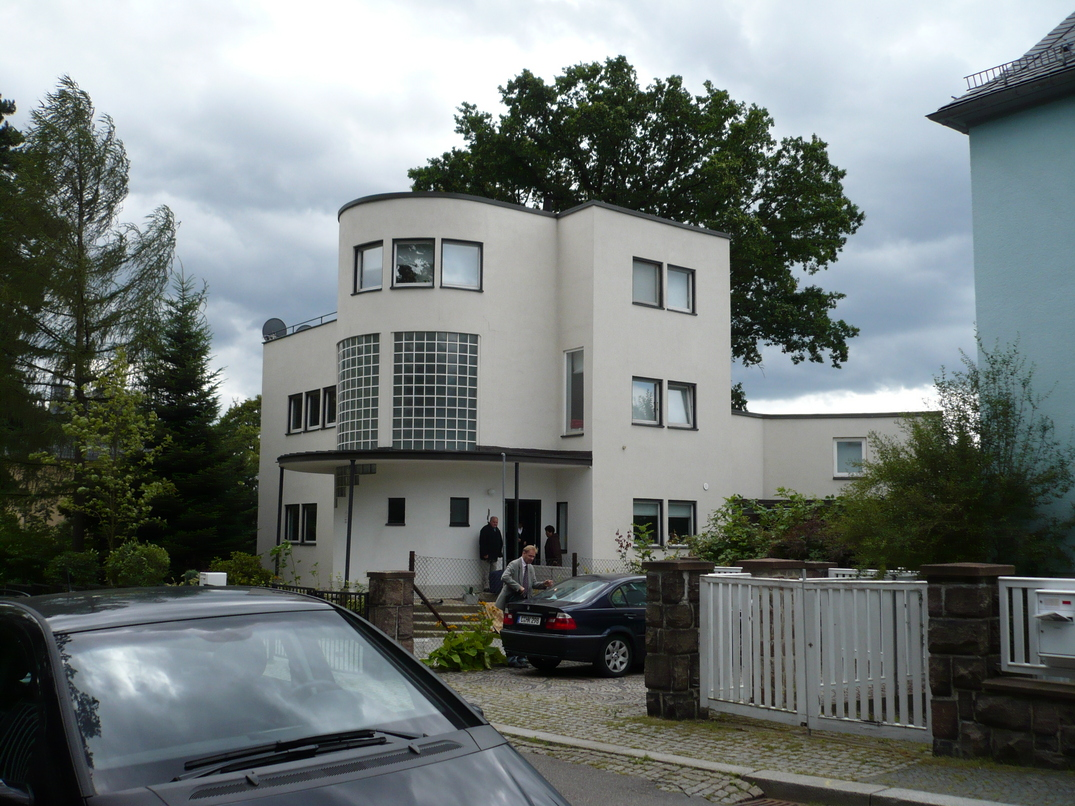
A Bauhaus style building in Chemnitz

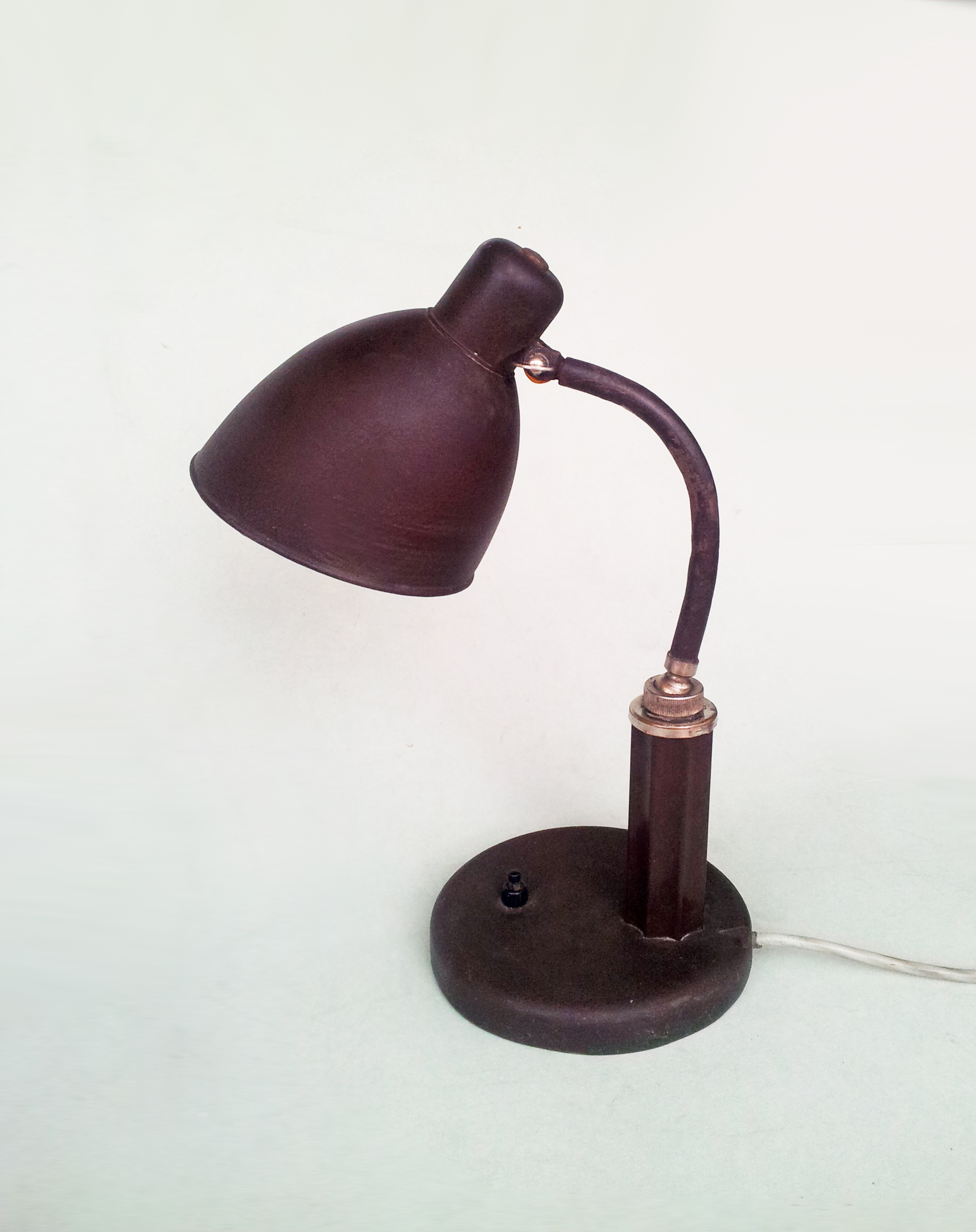
The Molitor Grapholux lamp, by Christian Dell (1922–1925)

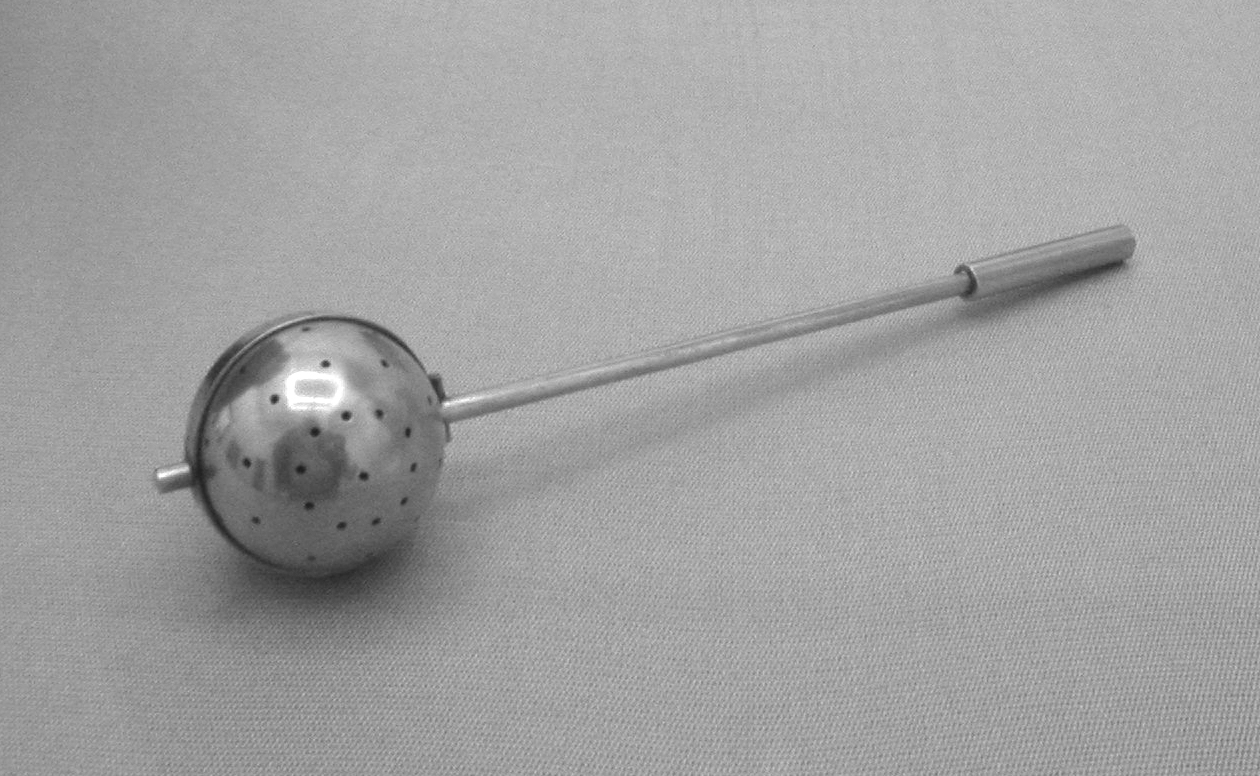
Tea infuser by Otto Rittweger, Josef Knau, and Wolfgang Tümpel (1924)

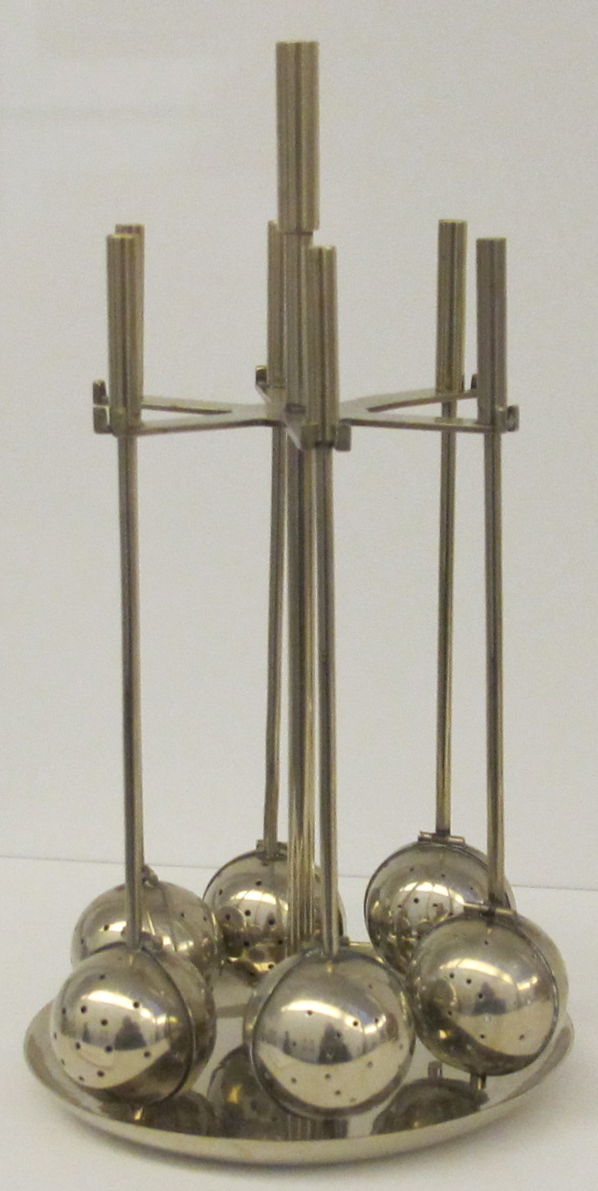
Set of six tea infusers with stand (per previous)

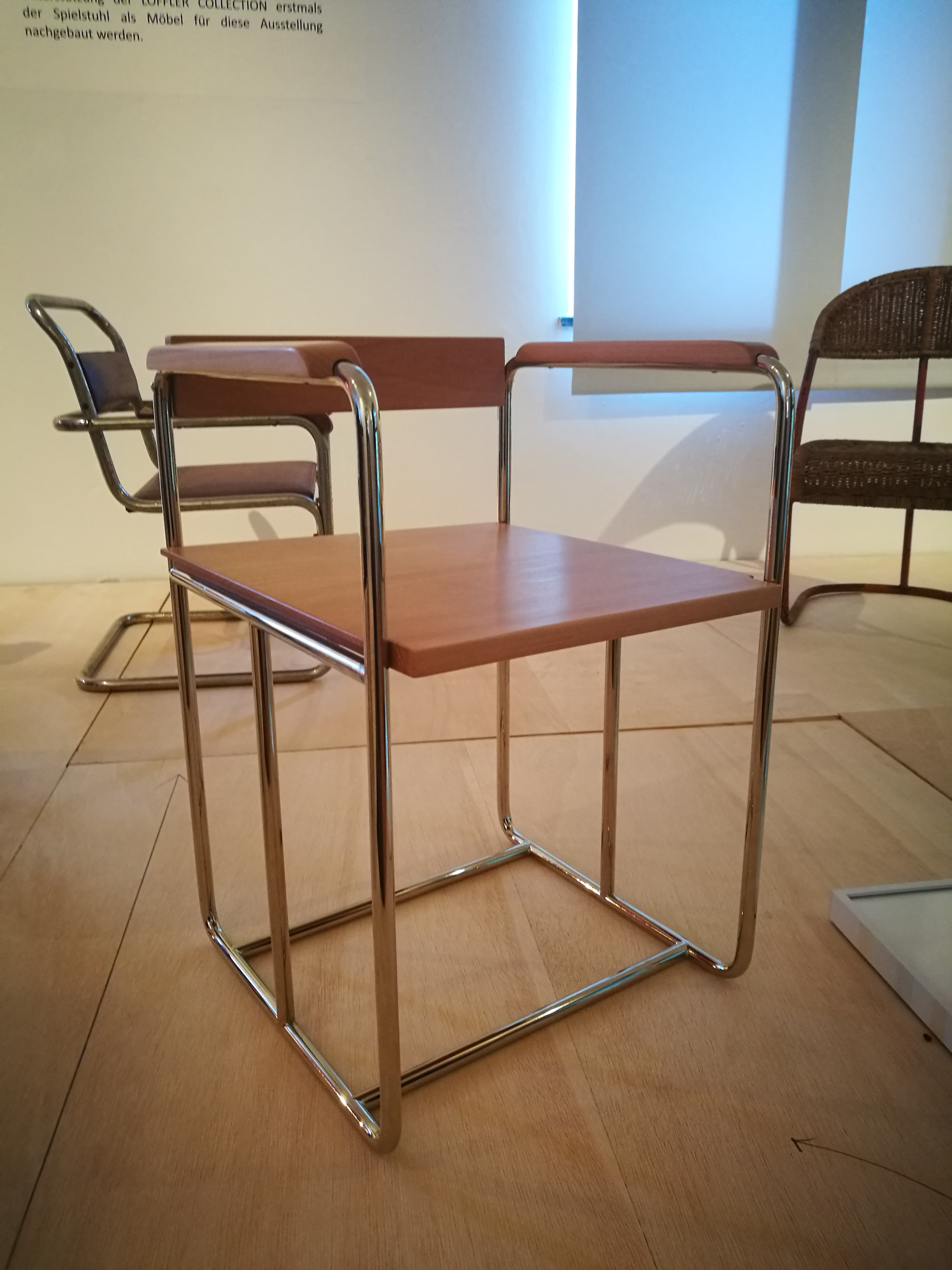
Children's chair by Heinrich Neuy (1930)

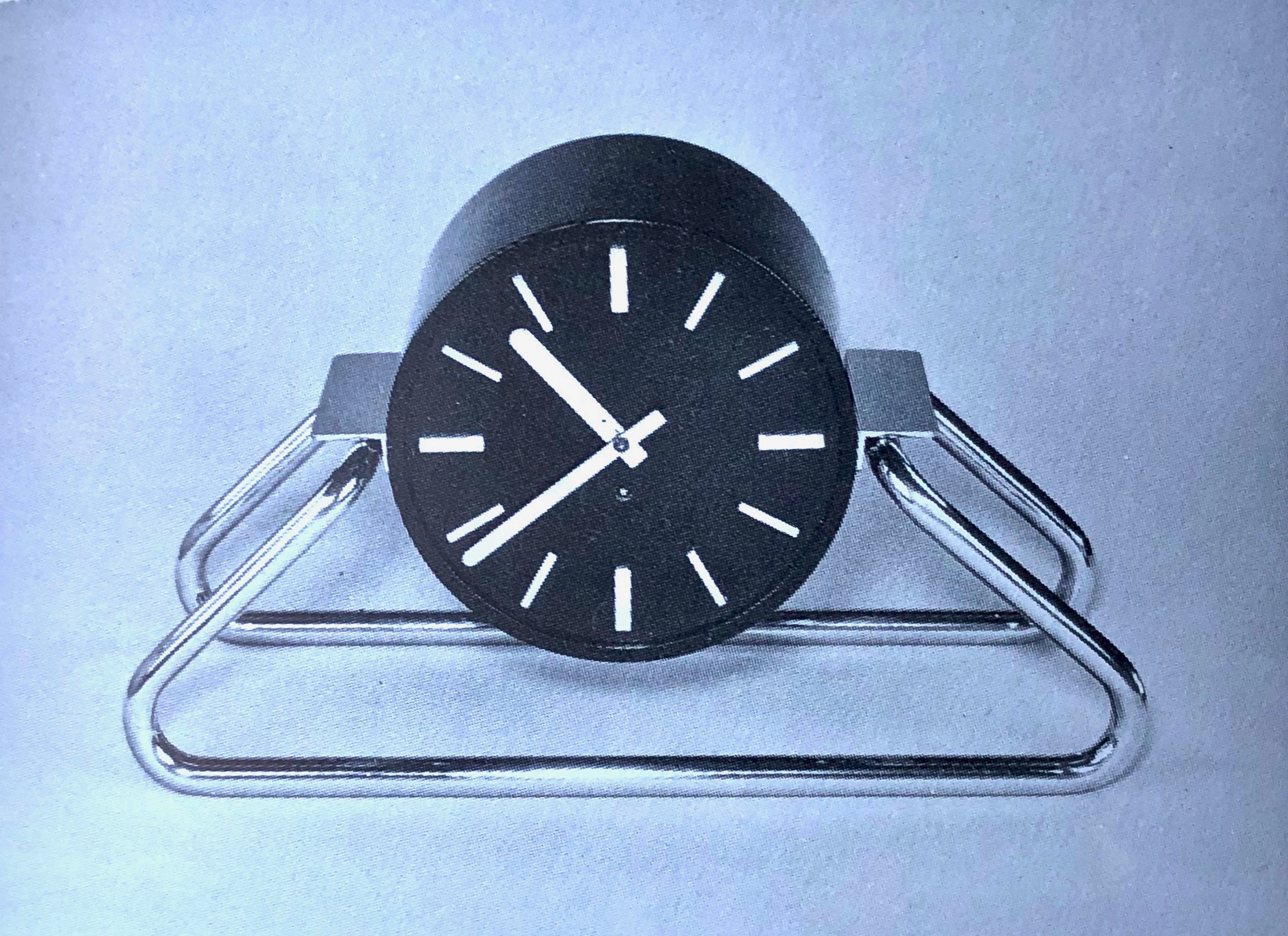
Clock designed by Erich Dieckmann (1931)

== See also ==
- Art Deco architecture
- Bauhaus Archive
- Bauhaus Center Tel Aviv
- Bauhaus Dessau Foundation
- Bauhaus Museum, Tel Aviv
- Bauhaus Museum, Weimar
- Bauhaus Museum, Dessau
- Bauhaus Project (computing)
- Bauhaus World Heritage Site
- Constructivist architecture
- Expressionist architecture
- Form follows function
- Haus am Horn
- IIT Institute of Design
- International style (architecture)
- Lucia Moholy
- Max-Liebling House, Tel Aviv
- Modern architecture
- Neues Sehen (New Vision)
- New Objectivity (architecture)
- Swiss Style (design)
- Ulm School of Design
- Vkhutemas
- Women of the Bauhaus

== Explanatory footnotes ==
- ^{a} The closure, and the response of Mies van der Rohe, is fully documented in Elaine Hochman's Architects of Fortune.
- Google honored Bauhaus for its 100th anniversary on 12 April 2019 with a Google Doodle.

== General and cited references ==
- Oskar Schlemmer (1972). Tut Schlemmer (ed.). The Letters and Diaries of Oskar Schlemmer. Translated by Krishna Winston. Wesleyan University Press. ISBN 0-8195-4047-1.
- Stefan Boness (2012). Tel Aviv – The White City. Berlin: Jovis. ISBN 978-3-939633-75-4.
- Magdalena Droste, Peter Gossel, ed. (2005). Bauhaus. Taschen America LLC. ISBN 3-8228-3649-4.
- Marty Bax (1991). Bauhaus Lecture Notes 1930–1933. Theory and practice of architectural training at the Bauhaus, based on the lecture notes made by the Dutch ex-Bauhaus student and architect J.J. van der Linden of the Mies van der Rohe curriculum. Amsterdam: Architectura & Natura. ISBN 90-71570-04-5.
- Anja Baumhoff (2001). The Gendered World of the Bauhaus. The Politics of Power at the Weimar Republic's Premier Art Institute, 1919–1931. Frankfurt, New York: Peter Lang. ISBN 3-631-37945-5.
- Boris Friedewald (2009). Bauhaus. Munich, London, New York: Prestel. ISBN 978-3-7913-4200-9.
- Catherine Weill-Rochant (2008). Rita H. Gans (ed.). Bauhaus: Architektur in Tel Aviv (in French and German). Zurich: Kiriat Yearim.
- Catherine Weill-Rochant (April 2009). The Tel-Aviv School : a constrained rationalism. DOCOMOMO journal (Documentation and conservation of buildings, sites and neighbourhoods of the modern movement).
- Peder Anker (2010). From Bauhaus to Ecohouse: A History of Ecological Design. LSU Press. ISBN 978-0-8071-3551-8.
- Kirsten Baumann (2007). Bauhaus Dessau: Architecture Design Concept. Berlin: JOVIS Verlag. ISBN 978-3-939633-11-2.
- Monika Markgraf, ed. (2007). Archaeology of Modernism: Renovation Bauhaus Dessau. Berlin: JOVIS Verlag. ISBN 978-3-936314-83-0.
- Torsten Blume / Burghard Duhm (Eds.) (2008). Bauhaus.Theatre.Dessau: Change of Scene. Berlin: JOVIS Verlag. ISBN 978-3-936314-81-6.
- Eric Cimino (2003). Student Life at the Bauhaus, 1919–1933 (M.A.). Boston: UMass-Boston.
- Olaf Thormann: Bauhaus Saxony. arnoldsche Art Publishers 2019, ISBN 978-3-89790-553-5.
- Eugenio Vega: Mito y realidad de la Bauhaus, 1919-1972. Madrid: Experimenta Libros.
