= Bauhaus Museum Dessau =

Bauhaus museum in Dessau, Germany

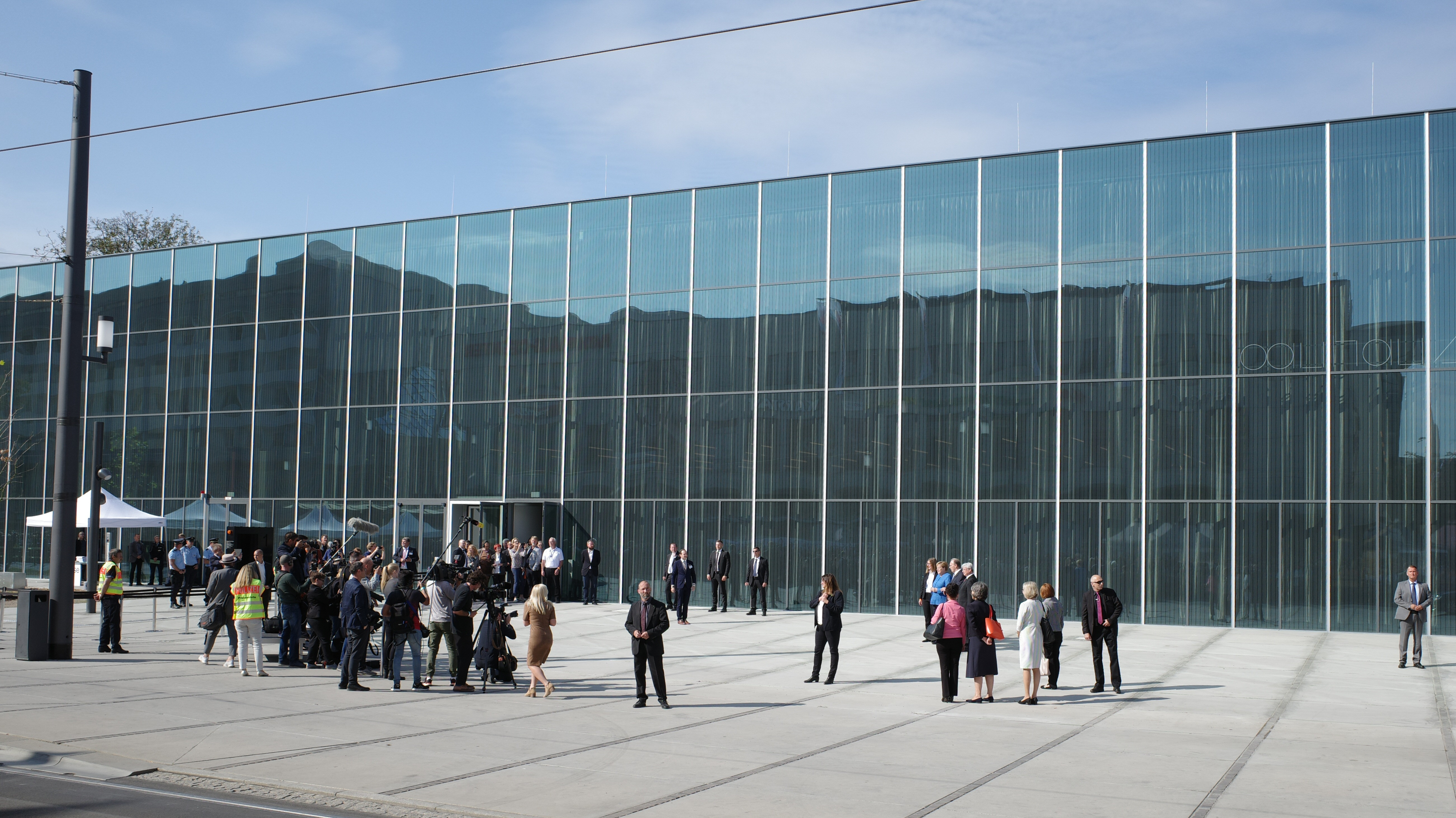
- Established: 2019
- Coordinates: 51.8346°N 12.2421°E
- Type: Art museum Design museum Architecture museum
- Website: bauhaus-dessau.de/en/architecture/bauhaus-museum-dessau.html

The Bauhaus Museum Dessau is a museum dedicated to the Bauhaus design movement located in Dessau, Germany. The museum's collection of 49,000 is the second-largest collection of Bauhaus-related objects in the world. Opened in 2019, it is operated by the Bauhaus Dessau Foundation.

The museum's building was designed by the Spanish architecture firm Addenda Architects. Its lower atrium floor houses temporary exhibitions, while the upper floor is devoted to the permanent collection.
