= Christian Dell =

German silversmith

Christian Dell (24 February 1893 – 18 July 1974) was a German silversmith.

== Biography ==
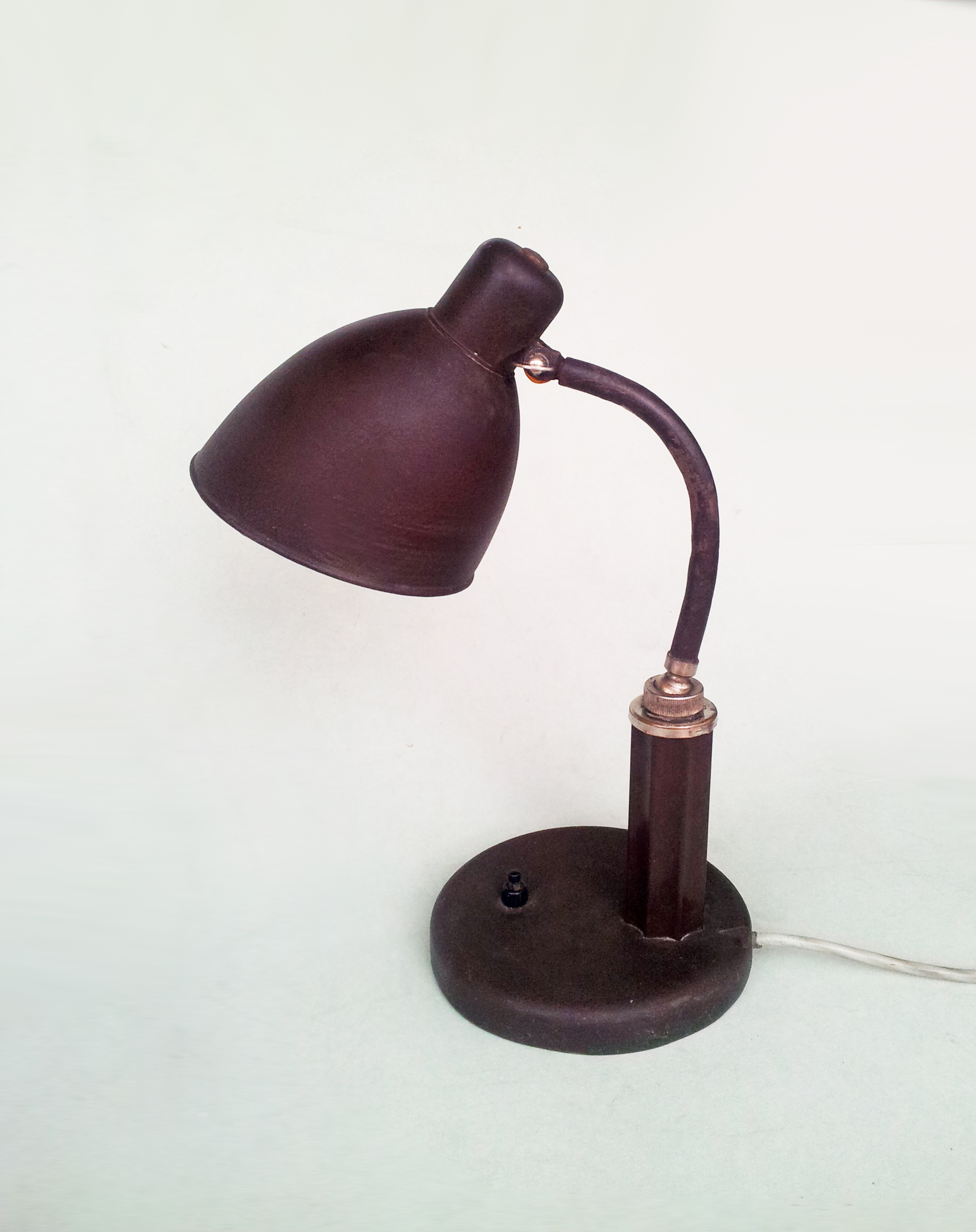
The Molitor Grapholux lamp, painted in the colour of its bakelite stick

Dell was born in Offenbach am Main in Hesse. From 1907 to 1911 he completed the silver forging studies at the academy. In 1912-13 he studied at the Saxon college of arts and crafts in Weimar. From 1922 to 1925 he worked as a foreman of the metal workshop at the Bauhaus in Weimar. In 1926 he changed to the Frankfurt art school (Städelschule). The Nazi Party did not allow him to stay there in 1933, but Walter Gropius offered him a job in the United States. However, Dell decided to remain in Germany.

After World War II, Dell manufactured silver goods and opened a jewellery shop in Wiesbaden in 1948, which he operated until 1955. He died in Wiesbaden in 1974.

Beginning in 1926 Dell sketched lights, at first for the New Frankfurt-project. As an early industrial designer and pioneer of plastic design, Dell used bakelite and aminoplastics as materials for his works for Molitor-Zweckleuchten in 1929–30. Well known are the lights for the lamp factory Gebr. Kaiser & Co. in Neheim Hüsten beginning in 1933–34, which were produced in large quantities. The Kaiser Idell brand and production of lamps are owned by the Danish design company Fritz Hansen

== Bibliography ==
- Marion Godau, Bernd Polster: Design Lexikon Deutschland, Köln 2000, ISBN 3-8321-4429-3
- Peter M. Kleine, Klaus Struve: "Idee Christian Dell" Katalog zur Ausstellung in der Sparkasse Arnsberg-Sundern 1996, ISBN 3-928394-13-4
- Beate Alice Hofmann: Christian Dell. Silberschmied und Leuchtengestalter im 20. Jahrhundert. Katalog zur Ausstellung im Museum Hanau, Hanau 1996, ISBN 3-926011-32-7
- Günter Lattermann: Bauhaus ohne Kunststoffe? - Kunststoffe ohne Bauhaus? In: form+zweck, 2003. Jahrgang, p. 110-127, ISBN 3-935053-03-7
- Klaus Weber, Bauhaus Archiv: Die Metall Werkstatt am Bauhaus, Berlin 1992, ISBN 3-891-81405-4
