= Sotsmisto, Zaporizhzhia =

Neighborhood in Zaporizhzhia, Ukraine

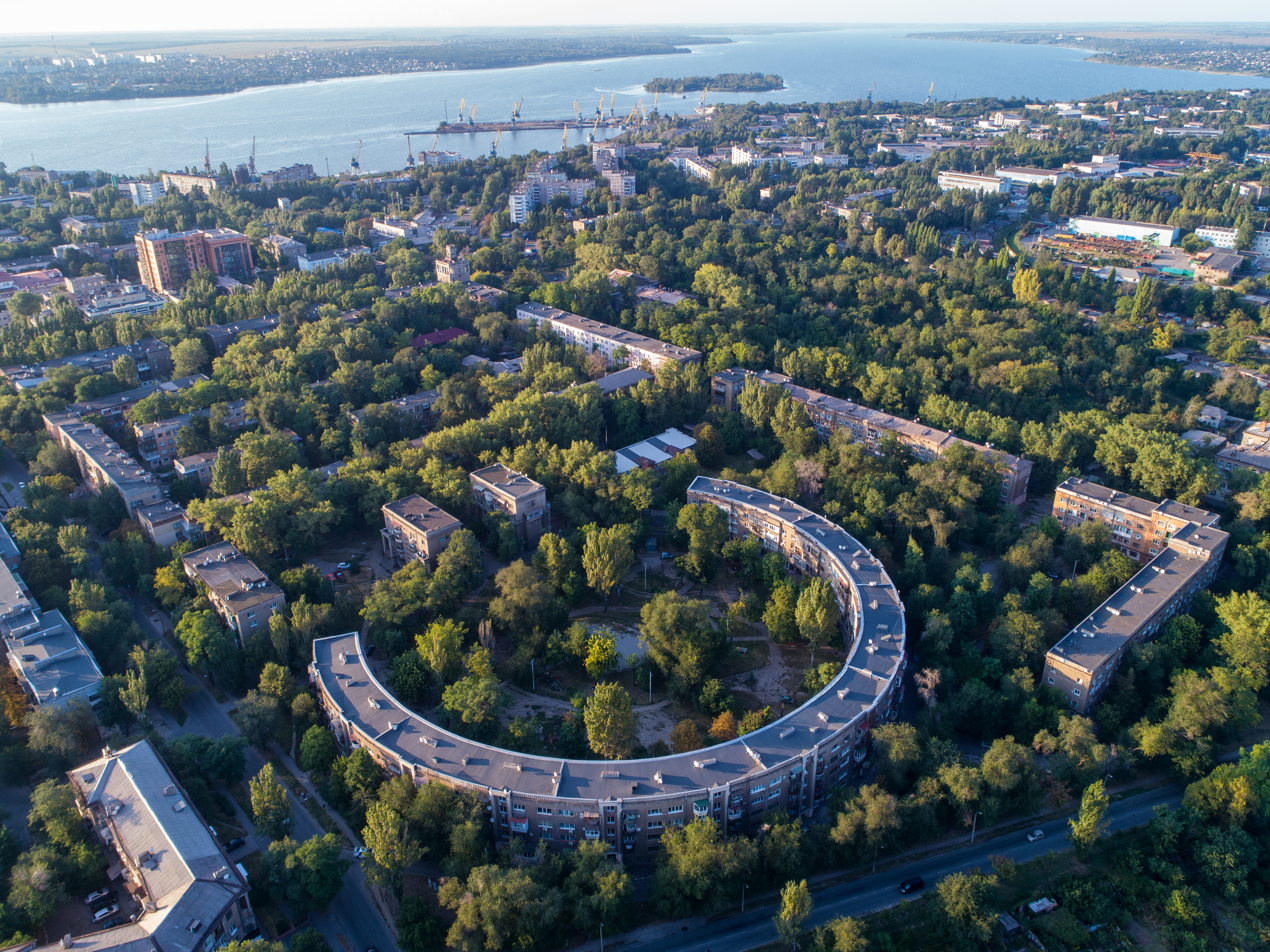
View of Sotsmisto from above. The Round House is in the foreground.

Sotsmisto (Ukrainian: Соцмісто), or Sixth Settlement (Ukrainian: Шосте селище, romanized: Shoste selyshche) is a residential neighborhood built in 1930s in Zaporizhzhia. The ensemble is built in interwar modernist and constructivist style. This neighborhood is an outstanding example of a functional part of a modern industrial city that reflects values of early Ukrainian SSR.

== History ==
The construction of Sotsmisto of Zaporizhzhia was experimental, just like constructivism as a style in the 1920s and 1930s. The constructions reflect the romanticization of socialist ideas of early USSR. For example, the architecture incorporates art that is not characteristic of social realism (the style that gained popularity after constructivism).

Most examples of constructivist architecture are found in the neighborhood known as Sixth Settlement. The construction of Sotsmisto started with the Building of Culture of Metallurgists, but DniproHES is considered the heart of industrial Zaporizhzhia. This is because the neighborhood was built primarily to house workers of DniproHES. The area was planned to embody the ideals of a Soviet proletariat.

== Preservation ==
Sotsmisto is located under a protected zone in Zaporizhzhia together with the city centre. Attempts have been made to inscribe the Sotsmisto and DniproHES on the tentative World Heritage list.

== Famous buildings ==
- The Round House
- The House of Culture of Metallurgists
- Ensemble of four houses designed by Olha Yafa. Its uniqueness lies in the decoration made from Armenian tuff, which is not envisaged by constructivist style.
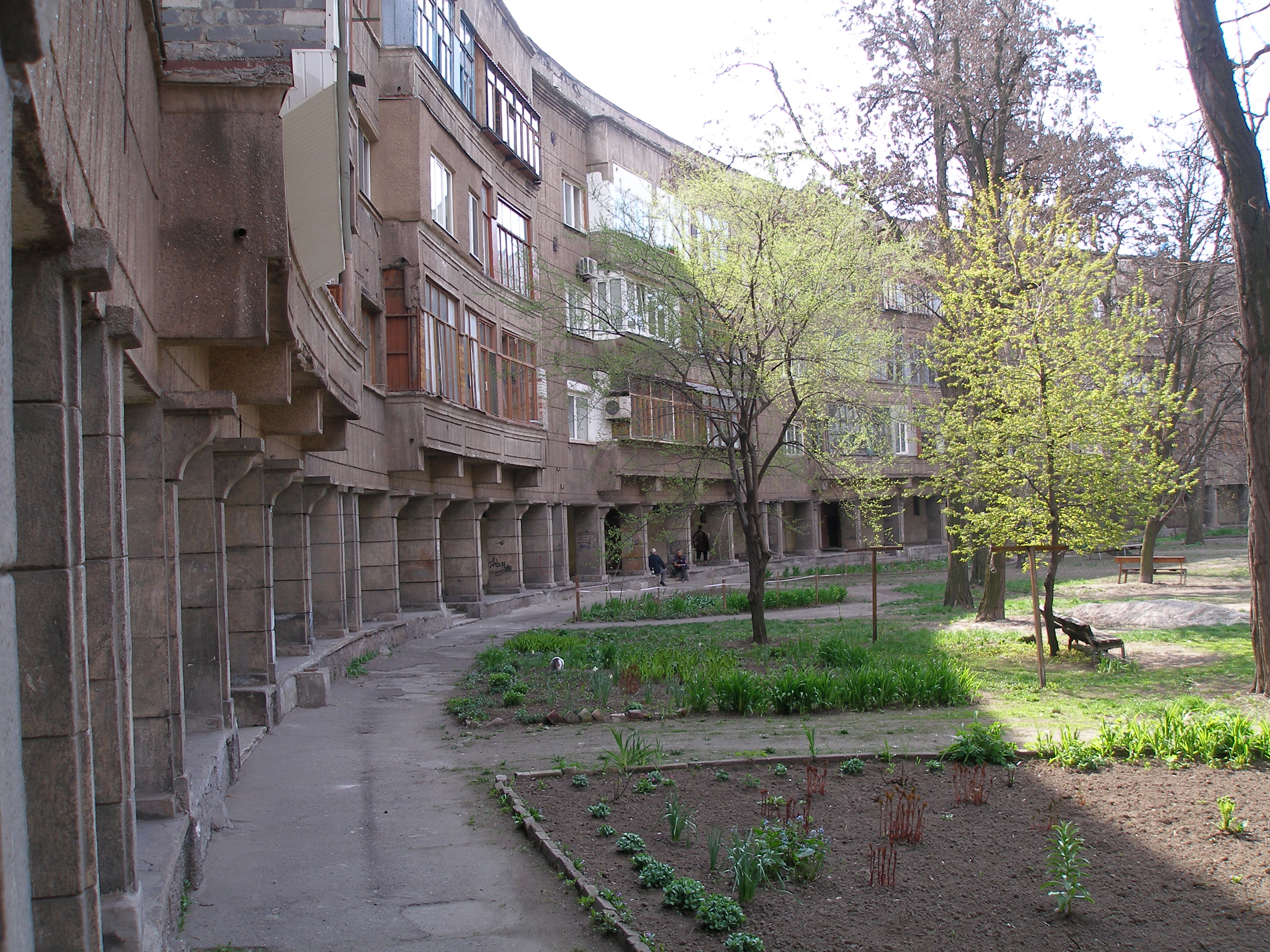
The Round House

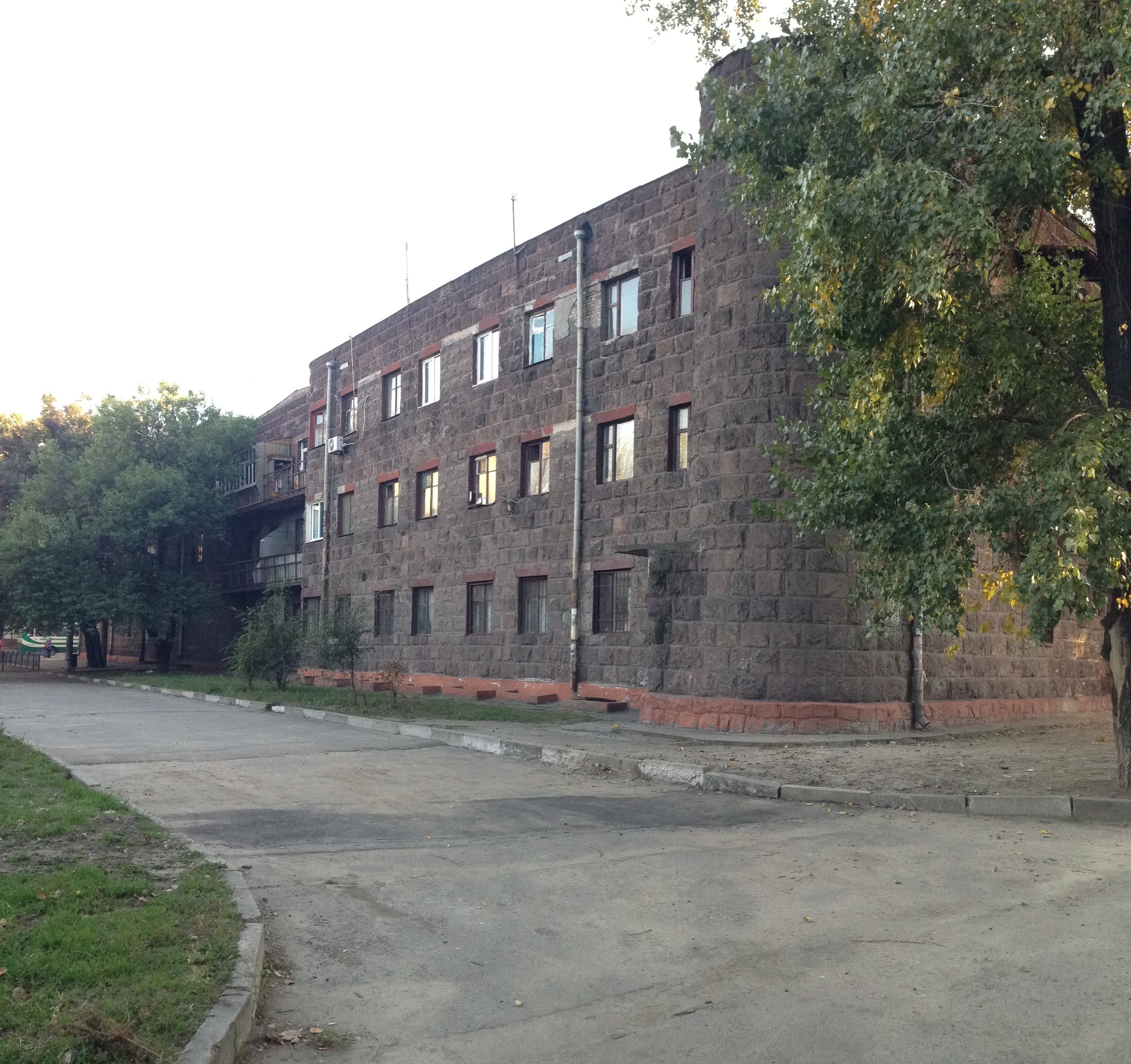
Residential house at Metalurhiv Avenue, 4

Residential house at Metalurhiv Avenue, 6

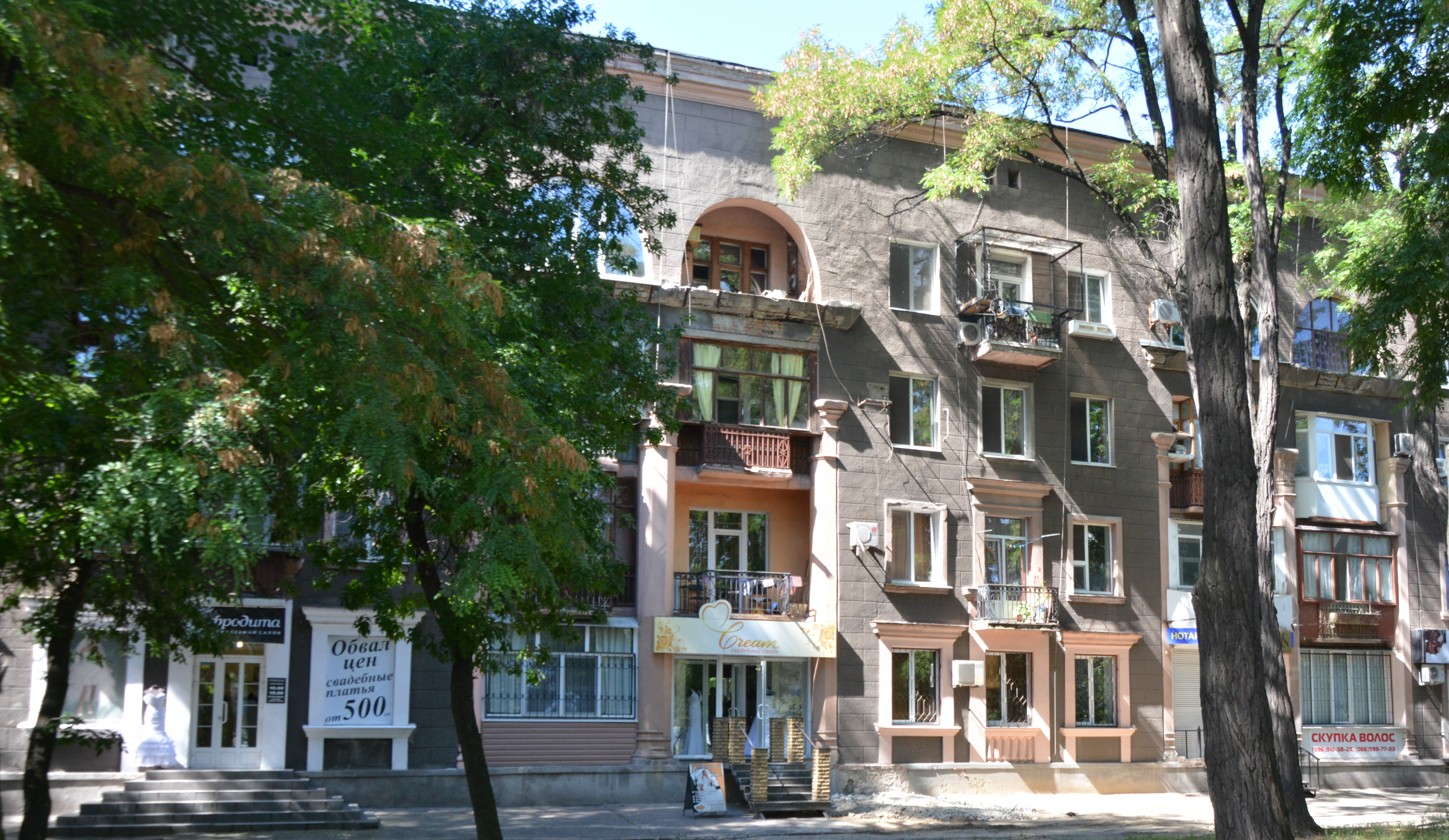
Residential house at Metalurhiv Avenue, 22

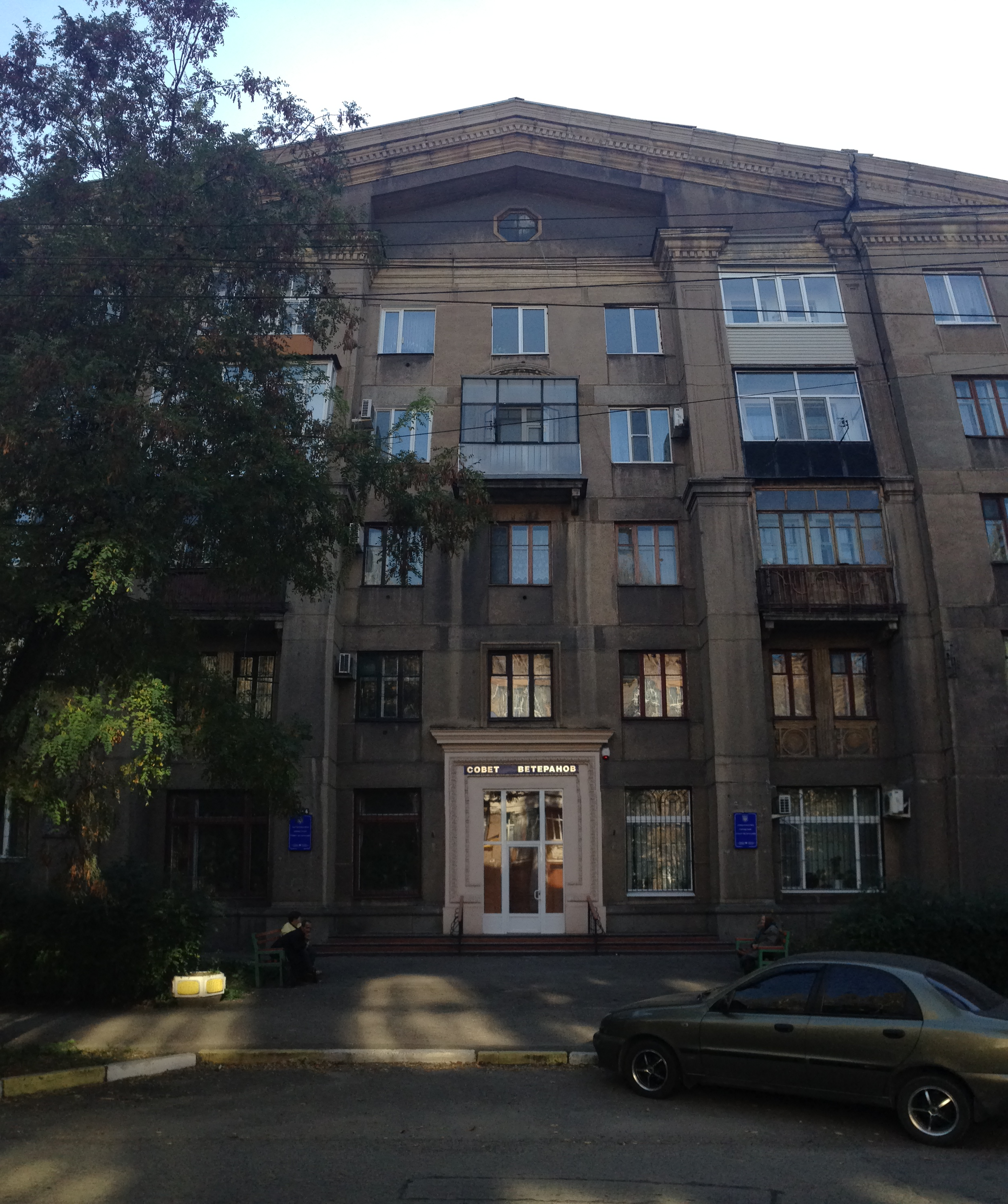
Residential house at Nezalezhnoi Ukrainy St., 6

Residential house at Rekordna St., 11

Library

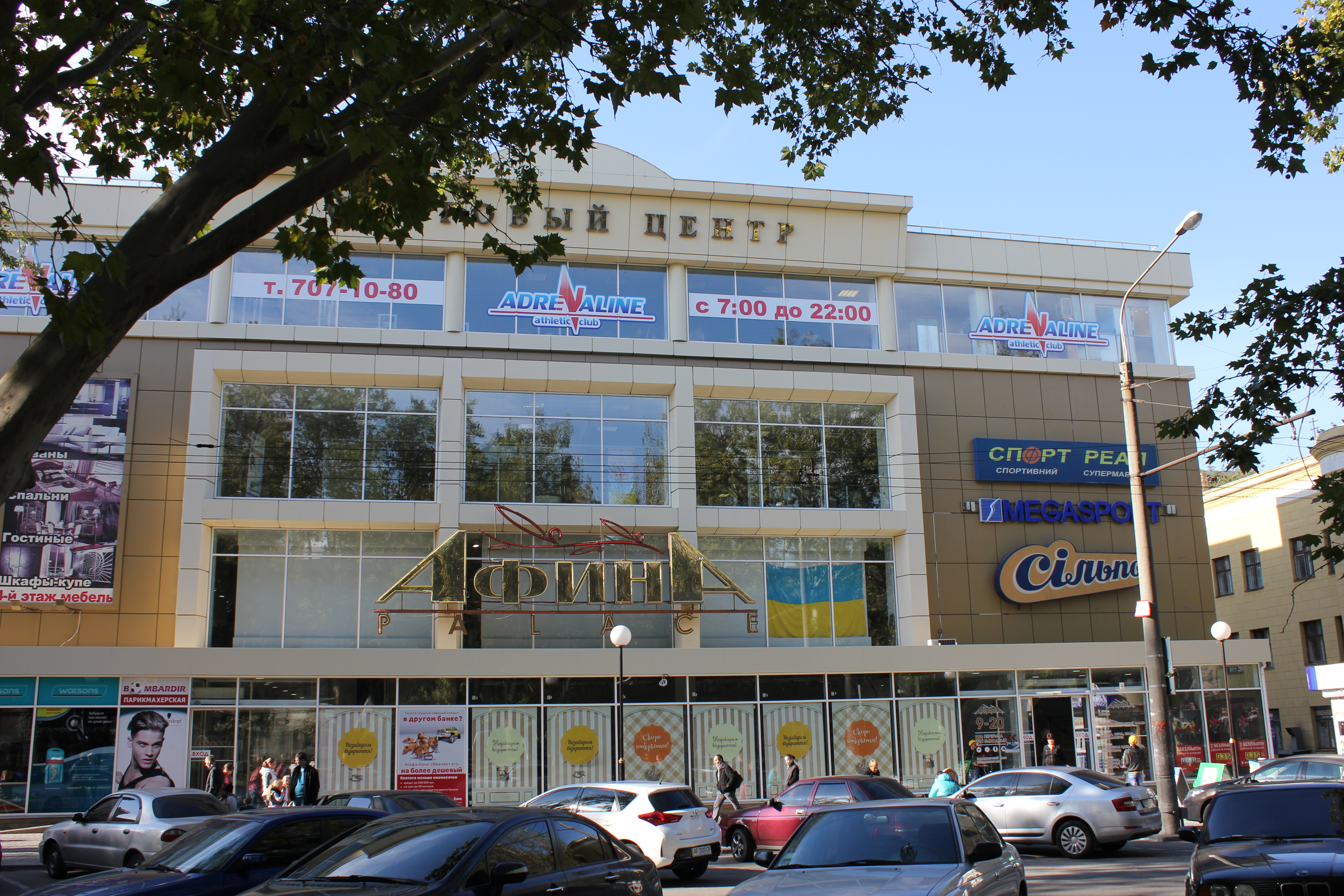
Mall

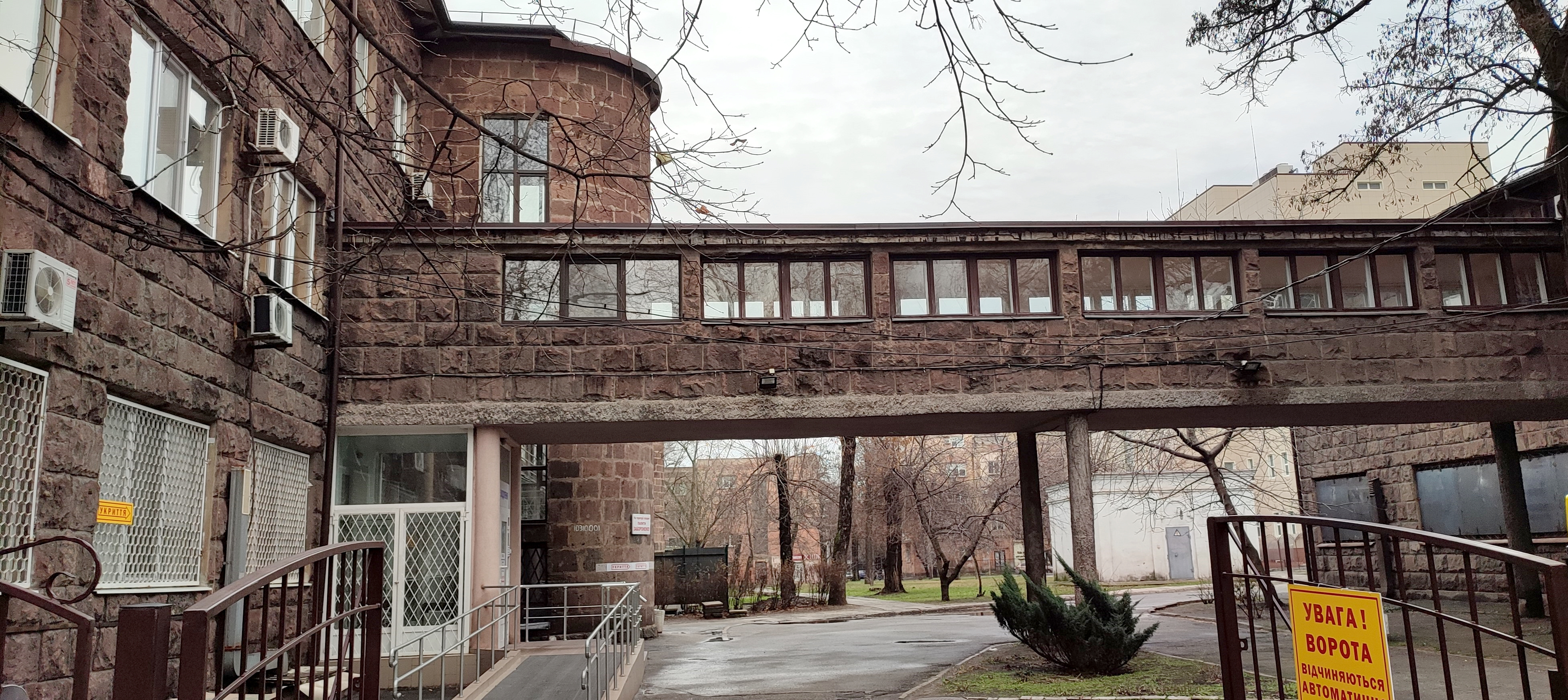
Hospital

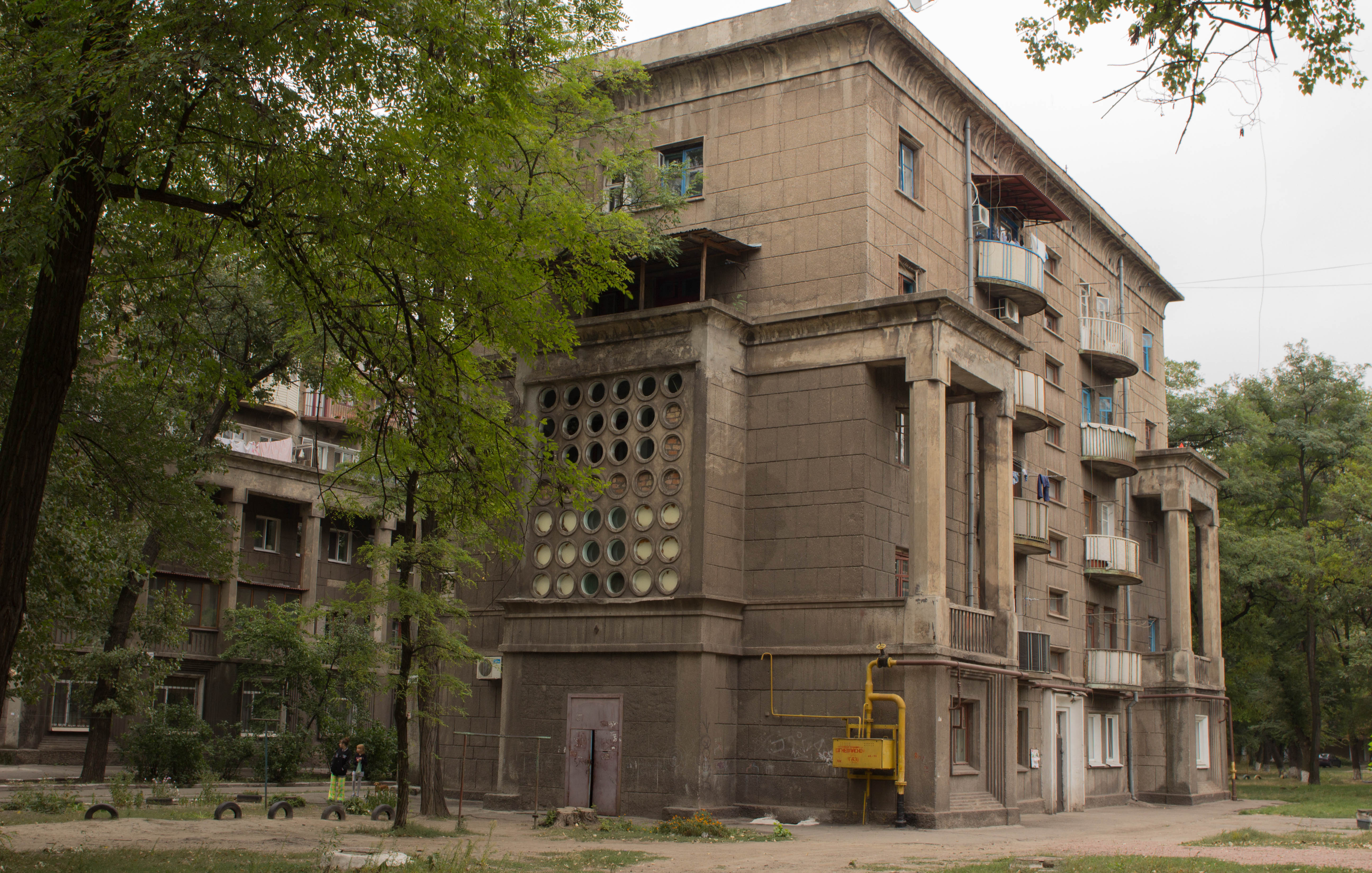
Housing complex of Zaporizhstal workers

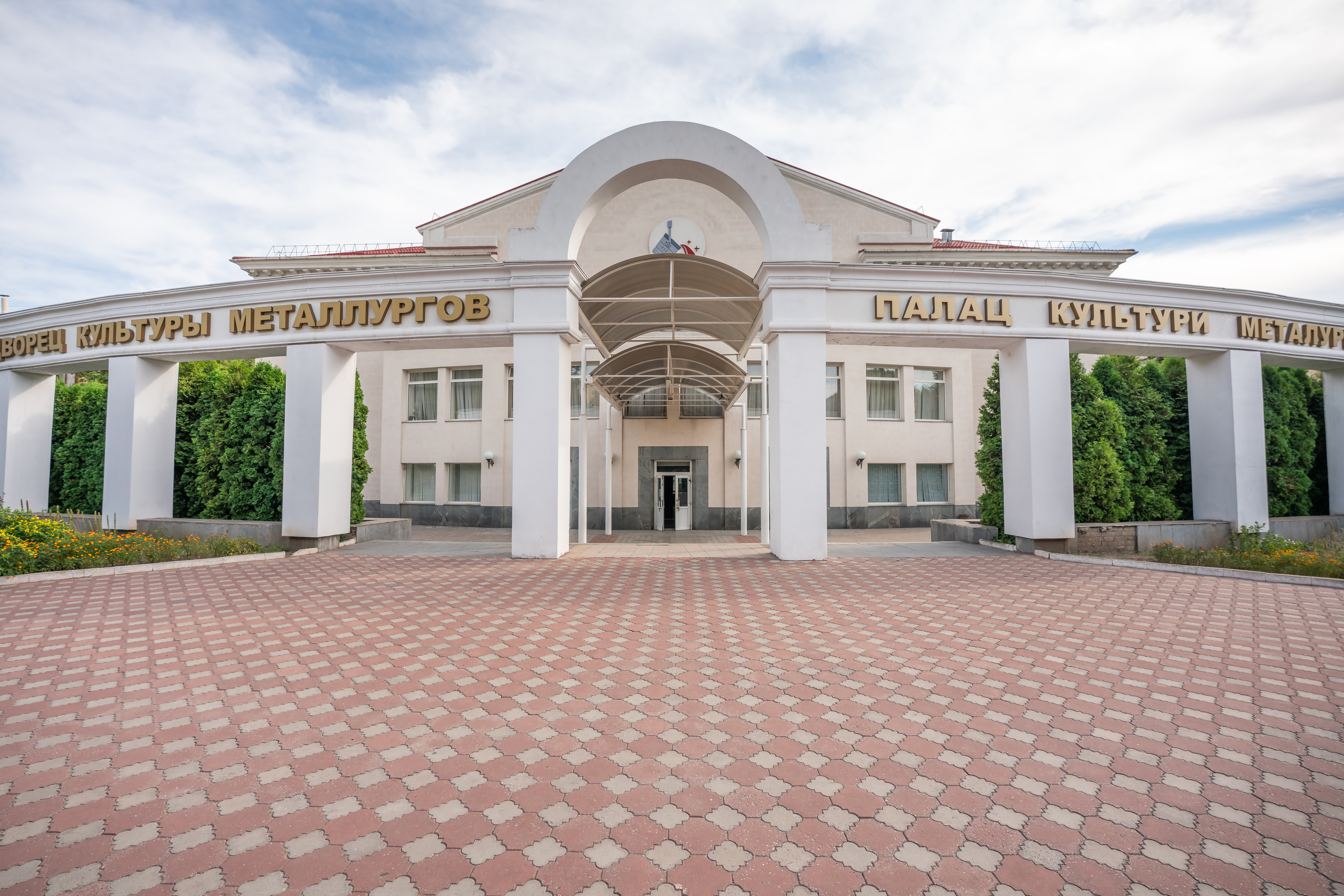
Palace of Culture of Metallurgists
