= Na'im Busofash =

Israeli Weekend Public Transportation Array

- The logo of Na'im Busofash
- Founded: November 22, 2019
- Website: Official website (in Hebrew); Official website (in English); Official website (in Arabic)

Na'im Busofash (Hebrew: נעים בסופ"ש, lit. "Moving on weekend" and "Pleasant on weekend") is an Israeli weekend public transportation array that exists in 12 authorities in Gush Dan and outside of it – Givatayim, Kiryat Ono, Ramat HaSharon, Tel Aviv-Yafo, Shoham, Modi'in, Hod HaSharon, Kfar Saba, Mevaseret Zion, Ness Ziona, Herzliya, and Ra'anana. It was launched in November 2019 to provide service on Shabbat, when most public transportation in Israel is inactive.

== History ==
=== The Status Quo in Israel about public transportation on Shabbat ===
As a part of the Status Quo in Israel about the Shabbat, in most areas of Israel, public transportation is inactive on Shabbat (Except for lines in remote settlements at the edges of the country, the city of Haifa and other mixed cities such as Nazareth and Nof HaGalil, taxis and Share taxis).

During the 2010s, a number of private projects aimed at operating transportation services on weekends (and especially on Shabbats) began by establishing cooperative associations. Such projects include "Shabus" (שבוס; a portmanteau of the words Shabbat and bus), which operates in Jerusalem; "Noa Tanua" (נוע תנוע; lit. "And yet it does move" - The Hebrew translation of Gallileo Gallilei's quote after the Catholic Church forced him to recant his observation that the Earth orbits the Sun), which operates in Gush Dan; Be'er Sheva and Haifa, "Sababus" (סבבוס; a portmanteau of the Hebrew word "Sababa" and the word "bus"), which operates between Ramat Gan and Tel Aviv; and "Kave HaHof" (קווי החוף; lit. "The coastlines"), which to operate in Herzliya and Tel Aviv.

=== "Na'im Busofash" project ===
In October 2019, it became known that a number of cities checked the possibility of operating scheduled bus lines on Shabbats. And in October 2019, The Municipality of Tel Aviv launched a tender for operating constant lines during the Sabbath, and started inquiries with nearby local authorities with a view to establishing a future network of lines that will operate across Gush Dan.

The service began operating on Friday, November 22, 2019 in 4 cities, Tel Aviv, Ramat HaSharon, Givatayim and Kiryat Ono, with 6 lines numbered 705-710

Operating public transportation in these areas is not against the law, because the law does not prohibit such public transportation, because it is operated privately by cities in Israel (and not by the transportation companies operated by the Ministry of Transportation), and because there is no charge for the ride (and if the Knesset would legislate a law regulating public transportation on Shabbat, the rides will cost money, because those rides will be officially considered public transportation in the law).

In January 2020, it became known that the local authorities Hod HaSharon, Shoham and Yehud-Monosson will join the project by the end of the month.

In the ninth week of the project activity (January 17–18, 2020), the seventh line, line 711, was added to the six lines that had operated until then, connecting Tel Aviv to Yehud-Monosson and Shoham. Soon after, Yehud-Monosson had withdrawn from the project.

In December 2021, Modi'in-Maccabim-Re'ut has joined the project, adding line 712 into the system. On the same date, line 717 was added to the system, connecting eastern Tel Aviv to the beach. In October 2023, the line was extended to Tel Aviv Port.

In July 2023, Hod HaSharon has joined the project, adding line 713.

In January 2024, Kfar Saba joined the project, adding line 714 and discontinuing "KfarSaBus", its own weekend bus service to Tel Aviv.

In June 2023, Mevaseret Zion has joined the project, making it the first municipality outside central Israel to do so. The added line, 715, would stop at select intersections in Highway 1, potentially serving other communities along its route such as Abu Ghosh.

In July 2023, Ness Ziona has joined the project, making it the tenth municipality to do so, adding line 716.

In June 2024, Herzeliya has joined the project, replacing the "Kave HaHof" lines into the system, marking an end to it. The lines, 721 and 722, share a similar route to the original "Kave HaHof" lines, while extending the routes in Tel Aviv southwards towards Carmelit Terminal.

In August 2024, Ra'anana has joined the project, adding line 723.

== About the project ==
Nowadays, 12 local authorities in Israel partner with the weekend transportation array: Givatayim, Kiryat Ono, Ramat HaSharon, Tel Aviv-Yafo, Shoham, Modi'in-Maccabim-Re'ut, Hod HaSharon, Kfar Saba, Mevaseret Zion, Ness Ziona and Herzliya.

The project is operated by the company "Taxi Service Lines 4,5 Ltd.", which won the bid for its operation.

The project currently operated every weekend (Friday-Saturday): On Friday, from 5:00 pm to 2:00 am; And on Saturday, from 9:00 am to 5:00 pm, with a frequency of 20 minutes regularly throughout the hours of operation.

The transportation network is based on buses and 19-seat minibuses transportation array. The array includes 13 lines across the authorities (lines 705–717 and 721-723), and stops at more than 600 stops. The lines let you ride to the center of the cities and between the various neighborhoods, and to the main entertainment and leisure places.

The "Na'im Busofash" line system is designed so it will pass mainly on the main roads and minimize entrance into inner streets in the neighborhoods, taking into account areas where Sabbath observers live. In addition, to prevent damage to share taxis, "Na'im Busofash" lines do not pass through the ride areas where share taxis operate on weekends.

The rides on "Na'im Busofash" lines are free, as charging for public transportation on weekends is prohibited by law (except where public transportation on Saturday is officially operated by the Ministry of Transportation).

The stations where the minibuses and buses pass are signed by stickers with the numbers of the lines that stop at them, and the minibuses and buses of the service are branded with signage, the number of lines and the main destinations where they stop at.

Every third bus that arrives (every hour and a half) is accessible for disabled passengers.

The electronic information screens at stops belong to and are operated by the Ministry of Transportation, and it's unable to receive information about "Na'im Busofash" lines, which operated by the municipalities. It is also not possible to get information about the availability and their routes in the official application of the Ministry of Transportation for ride times "Kol-Kav" (כל-קו; lit. "Every line"). Alternatively, 4 alternative transportation apps are available for this: "Otobus Karov" (אוטובוס קרוב; lit. "Bus Nearby"), "Efo Bus" (איפה בוס; lit. "Where's a Bus"), "My-Way", and "Moovit".

During the service hours on the weekends, there is a call center that can be contacted. There is a dedicated site for the project, available in Hebrew, English and Arabic, where information about the service can be found.

== Lines ==
Line	Route
705	Tel Aviv, Wolfson Medical Center – Mahrozet – Ajami – Jaffa Port – Jaffa Clock Tower – Manshiya – Beach – Ben Gurion Blvd. – Tel Aviv City Hall – Ichilov Hospital – Arlozorov Terminal – Nahalat Yitzhak. Givatayim, Katzenelson St. – Weizman St. – Azrieli Givatayim – Adit Wolfson Park
706	Tel Aviv, Wolfson Medical Center – Bloomfield Stadium – Jaffa Port – Jaffa Clock Tower – Manshiya – Carmelit Terminal – Shalom Meir Tower – Rothschild Blvd. – Habima Square – Dizengoff Center – Rabin Square – Ichilov Hospital – Kikar Hamedina – Namir Rd. – Planetarium – Ramat Aviv – Ramat Aviv Mall – Tel Aviv University – Tel Baruch – Neot Afeka. Ramat HaSharon, HaKfar HaYarok – Moresha
707 Jerusalem Blvd.
708	Tel Aviv, Wolfson Medical Center – Mahrozet – Neve Ofer – Abu Kabir – Florentine – Rothschild Blvd. – Habima Square – Dizengoff Center – Tel Aviv Port – Sportek – Expo Tel Aviv – Hadar Yosef Stadium – Neve Dan – Tzahala – Ramat HaHayal
709	Tel Aviv, HaTayasim Terminal – HaTikvah Market – Yad Eliyahu – Menora Mivtachim Arena – Tel Aviv Cinematheque – Habima Square – Dizengoff Center – Tel Aviv Port – Kokhav HaTzafon – Levi Eshkol Ave. – Migdalei Ne'eman – Cinema City Glilot
710	Cinema City Glilot – Tel Aviv, Migdalei Ne'eman – Ramat Aviv Gimel – Tel Aviv University – Sportek – Tel Aviv Port – Ben Gurion Blvd. – Tel Aviv City Hall – Rabin Square – London Ministores Mall – Sarona – Azrieli Center – Yad Eliyahu – Adit Wolfson Park. Ramat Gan, Aluf Sadeh Rd. – Tel HaShomer. Kiryat Ono, Shlomo HaMelekh St. – Ono Mall – Pisgat Ono
711	Tel Aviv, Kokhav HaTzafon – Tel Aviv Port – Dizengoff Center – Habima Square – Rothschild Blvd. – HaRakevet St. – Shoham
712	Tel Aviv, Kokhav HaTzafon – Tel Aviv Port – Dizengoff Center – Habima Square – Rothschild Blvd. – HaRakevet St. – Modi'in – Paatei Modi'in
713	Tel Aviv, Carmelit Terminal – Beach – Dizengoff Center – Habima Square – London Ministores Mall – Rabin Square – Tel Aviv City Hall – Pinkas St. – Yehuda HaMacabi St. – Namir Rd. – Levinsky College. Ramat HaSharon, Cinema City Glilot – HaKfar HaYarok – Moresha Interchange – Yarkon Interchange. Hod HaSharon, Ramatayim Interchange – Sharonim Mall – Azrieli Hod HaSharon – Magdiel – HaNesi'im St.
714	Tel Aviv, Carmelit Terminal – Beach – Dizengoff Center – Habima Square – London Ministores Mall – Rabin Square – Tel Aviv City Hall – Sportek – Namir Rd. – Levinsky College – Cinema City Glilot – HaSira Interchange – Highway 531 – Ra'anana Junction – Kfar Saba, Green Kfar Saba Mall – Meir Hospital – Weizman St. – 'Arim Mall – Kfar Saba CBS – Industrial Areal – Neve Hadarim
715	Tel Aviv, Kokhav HaTzafon – Tel Aviv Port – Dizengoff Center – Habima Square – Rothschild Blvd. – HaRakevet St. – Mevaseret Zion
716	Ness Ziona – Highway 431 – Ayalon Highway – Tel Aviv, Kibbutz Galuyot Interchange – HaHagana rail station – HaMasger St. (Southbound: HaRakevet St.)– Tel Aviv Cinematheque – London Ministores Mall – Rabin Square – Tel Aviv City Hall – Tel Aviv Port – Kokhav HaTzafon
717	HaTayasim Terminal – Adit Wolfson Park – LaGuardia St. – HaRakevet St. – Levinsky Market – Florentine – American–German Colony – Manshiya – Carmelit Terminal – Beach – Marina – Ben Yehuda St. – Tel Aviv Port – Reading Terminal
721	Tel Aviv, Carmelit Terminal – Beach – Dizengoff Center – Habima Square – London Ministores Mall – Rabin Square – Tel Aviv City Hall – Kokhav HaTzafon – Namir Rd. Cinema City Glilot – Herzliya Marina – Aba Even Rd. – Seven Stars Mall – Shikun Amami – City Hall – Ben Gurion Ave.
722	Tel Aviv, Carmelit Terminal – Beach – Dizengoff Center – Habima Square – London Ministores Mall – Rabin Square – Tel Aviv City Hall – Kokhav HaTzafon – Namir Rd. Cinema City Glilot – Herzliya, Marina – Herzliya Pituach – Kfar Shmaryahu – Seven Stars Mall – Herzliya Park – Reichman University – Yerushalayim Rd.
723	Tel Aviv, Carmelit Terminal – Beach – Dizengoff Center – Habima Square – London Ministores Mall – Rabin Square – Tel Aviv City Hall – Kokhav Hatzafon – Namir Rd. – Cinema City Glilot – HaSira Interchange – Highway 531. Ra'anana, Hen Interchange – Pardes Meshutaf St. – Ahuza St. – Yerushalayim Rd. – Lev HaPark – Weizmann St. – Kiryat Etgarim Industrial Area

Note: The colors assigned to each line is based on the colors from the official website of Na'im Busofash, the coloring may vary between every route-planning engine.

== Demand ==
In the first week of service activity (November 22–23, 2019), the demand for the project was higher than expected, and already in the first hour of operation, demand for rides was higher than expected, so the Tel Aviv municipality increased the service and added another minibus to each of the six lines on the network – three instead of two.

Because the ride is free, there is no mechanism that counts their exact number. But the first week, according to estimates, the service was used by about 10,000 people. As the frequency increases, and the minibuses are replaced by buses, it is planned to serve a much larger public.

To cope with the high demand was in the first week, in the second week of activity (November 29–30, 2019), the project was increased by additional minibuses and 52-seats buses. It was reported that the lines were still full of people, but no special malfunctions happened as in the first week.

== Criticism ==
=== Negative criticism ===
The weekend public transportation project "Na'im Busofash" has received many harsh criticisms from the religious and ultra-Orthodox Jews in Israel. On the fourth weekend of the project (December 13–14, 2019), hundreds of ultra-Orthodox people protested against the operation of the public transportation system. At the same protest, police arrested 16 ultra-Orthodox people for blocking roads, disorderly conduct and throwing stones at the cops.

In addition, some of the criticisms allege that the public transportation project on Shabbats is against the law.

While the meeting to approve joining the project in the city of Yehud-Monosson, hundreds of city residents came to the city hall in protest, calling "not to approve the anti-Jewish move".

Negative reviews also came from taxi drivers, but not about the service itself, but about the fact that it is free, thus it hurts their main livelihood (on the weekends). Drivers say they feel a dramatic drop in the number of the rides following the project.

=== Positive criticism ===
Alongside the many negative reviews, there have been many positive reviews of the public transportation project. Many positive reviews are heard from the passengers in the project, who in his first ride noted that "this is a historic day". Knesset member Avigdor Lieberman also praised the project that it "blocks the religious coercion that is trying to be forced in cities where there is a secular majority."

== See also ==
- Status quo (Israel)
