= Roy Schwartz Tichon =

Israeli entrepreneur (born 1992)

- רועי שוורץ תיכון
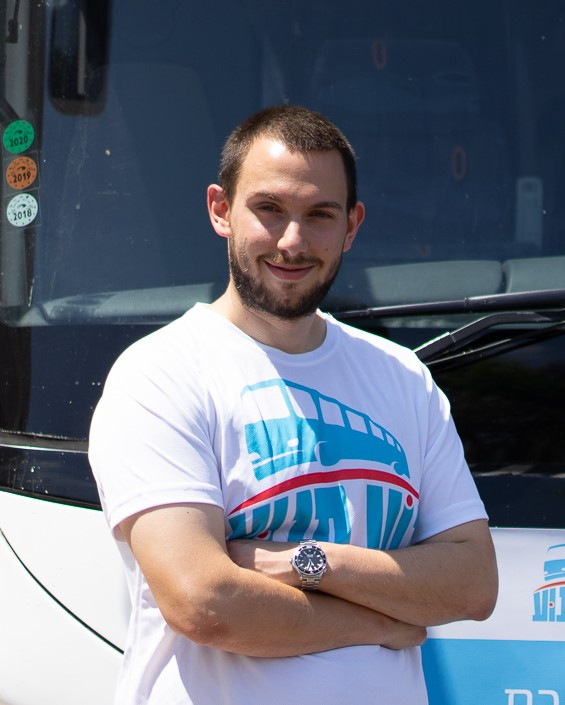
- Born: 1992; 34 years ago Haifa, Israel
- Education: Open University of Israel (BA)
- Known for: chairman of "Ve Af Al Pi Chen" cooperative

Roy Schwartz Tichon (Hebrew: רועי שוורץ תיכון; born 1992) is an Israeli entrepreneur, mostly known for making an alternative for public transportation on Shabbat (Saturday) in Israel. Schwartz Tichon is the chairman of "Ve Af Al Pi Chen" (Hebrew: ואף על פי כן) cooperative, which operates buses lines that changed the Status quo (Israel).

== Biography ==
Schwartz Tichon was born and grew in Haifa, studied at the Hebrew Reali School of Haifa. In 2011 he was recruited for the IDF and served in the Israeli air force. In 2015 he finished a bachelor's degree in economics at the Open University of Israel summa cum laude. His grandfather is the spokesman of the 14th Israeli parliament, Dan Tichon.

== Public activity ==
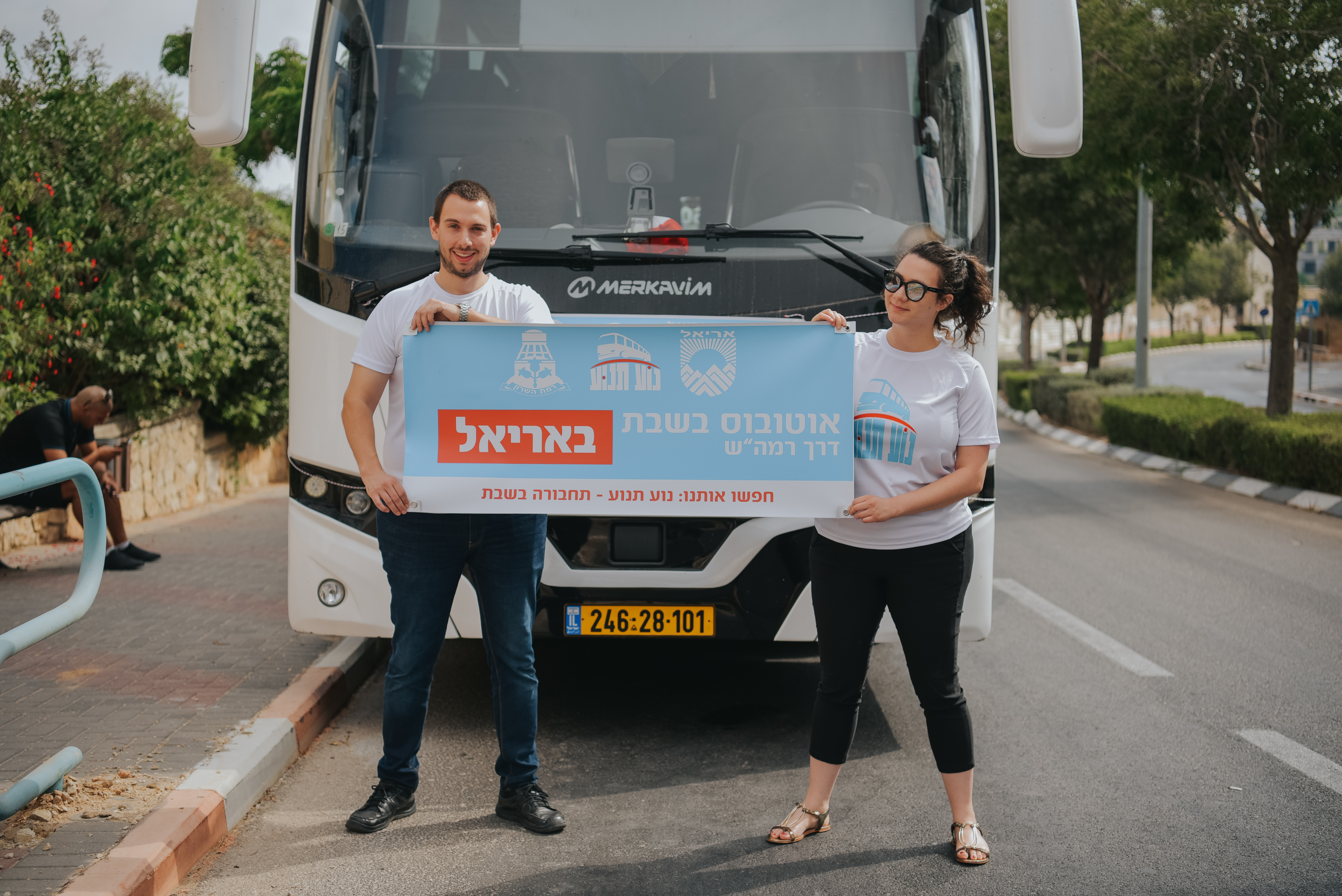
Schwartz Tichon and an activist in front of the bus that travels from Ariel to Tel Aviv

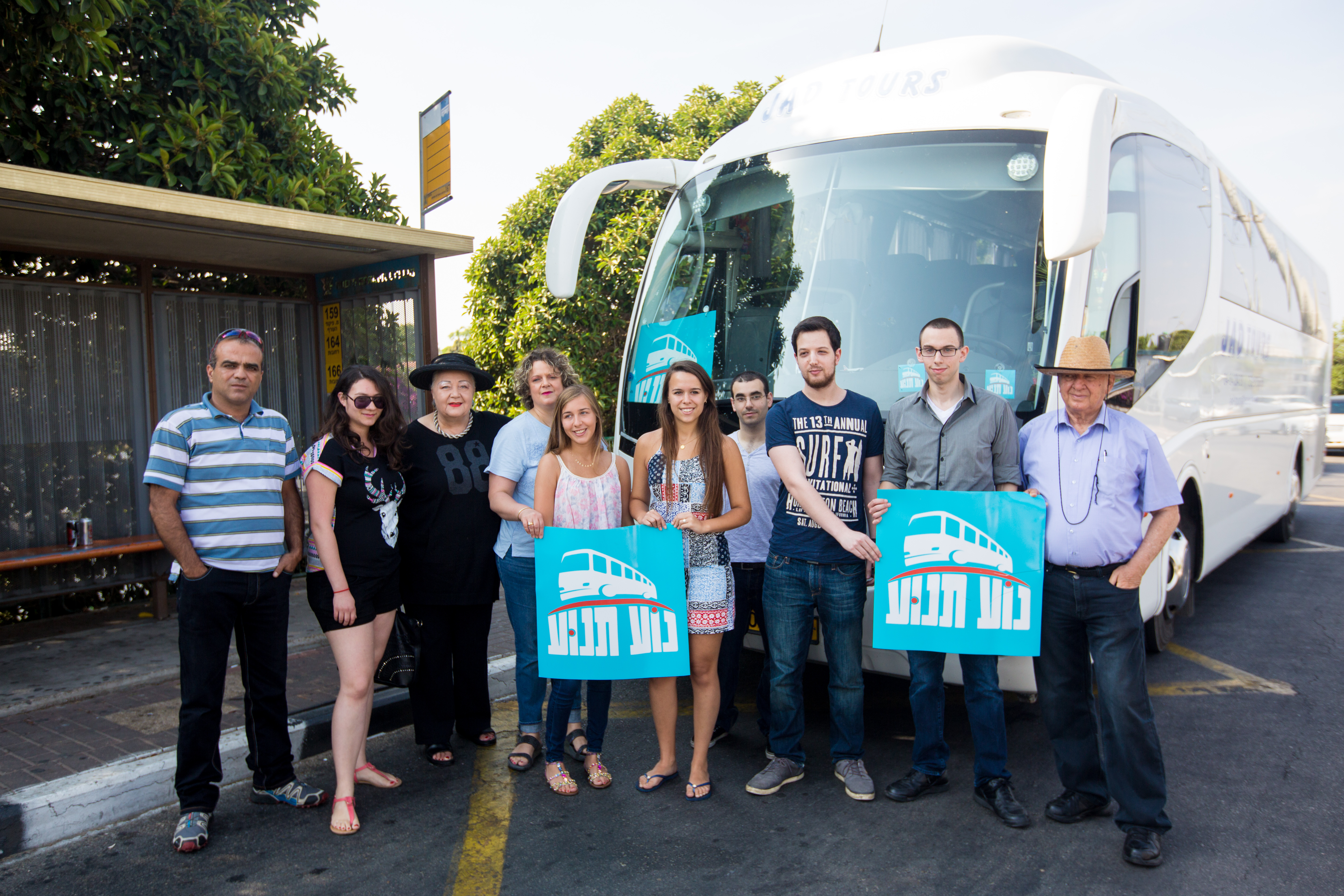
Dan Tichon, Schwartz Tichon and activists October 2015

In 2015, he launched Noa Tanua, using his army release grant and other savings. While the Israeli government forbids public transportation on Shabbat and other holidays in most of Israel, despite a wide public opposition, Schwartz Tichon used a legal loophole to maintain a private alternative project, operating in several major cities. The initiative is running through the "Ve Af Al Pi Chen" cooperative, in which he serves as chair and CEO, since launching.

In its first three years the organization focused on operating lines by itself, when in 2018 the organization pivoted to impact on the municipal governance. The organization promoted public transportation on Saturday during Israeli the municipal elections in 2018 and called for public support from politicians who promised to promote Saturday transportation. In 2019 the organization started to operate public transportation on Saturday through cooperation with mayors who were chosen in 2018, in municipalities throughout Israel, including: Tiberias, Ramat Gan, Kiryat Ono, Ganei Tikva, Ariel, Modi'in-Maccabim-Re'ut and Ramat Hasharon. In November 2019 "Na'im Busofash" (Hebrew for both "fine in the weekend" and "moving in the weekend") started its operation, a bus line network through Israel's central district initiated by Noa Tanua and led by the city of Tel Aviv. It is the first and only wide scale change in the operation of Saturday public transportation in Israel. In 2017 he was chosen for "People of 2017" by Time Out Tel Aviv, in 2018 he was chosen as one of the "36 under 36" of Calcalist. That year he participated in the translation of the fanfiction "Harry Potter and the Methods of Rationality", a book promoting rational thinking among adults and youth. Since 2018, Schwartz Tichon writes in the blog "If I were finance minister" in TheMarker website, discussing economic issues advocating for utilitarianism and classical liberalism. Schwartz Tichon also participates in some other media outlets such as Globes, Mako, Ynet and "The Congress" podcast.

Since 2020, Schwartz Tichon is the co-host of the podcast Shnekel with the journalist Idan Eretz.

In 2020, Schwartz Tichon joined the Carmel Forum for Health Policy, a forum of medical professionals and economists. In August 2021, Roy wrote a position paper advocating government incentives to promote vaccination among youth.

Schwartz Tichon wrote a position paper advocating government incentives to promote vaccination among youth which was later publicly supported by the Israeli minister of Justice, Gideon Sa'ar.

He is a Likud party member.

== Personal life ==
Schwartz Tichon lives in Tel Aviv. His grandfather is the spokesman of the 14th Israeli parliament, Dan Tichon.
