= Gush Dan =

Gush Dan גּוּשׁ דָּן (Hebrew) غوش دان (Arabic)
- Metropolitan area
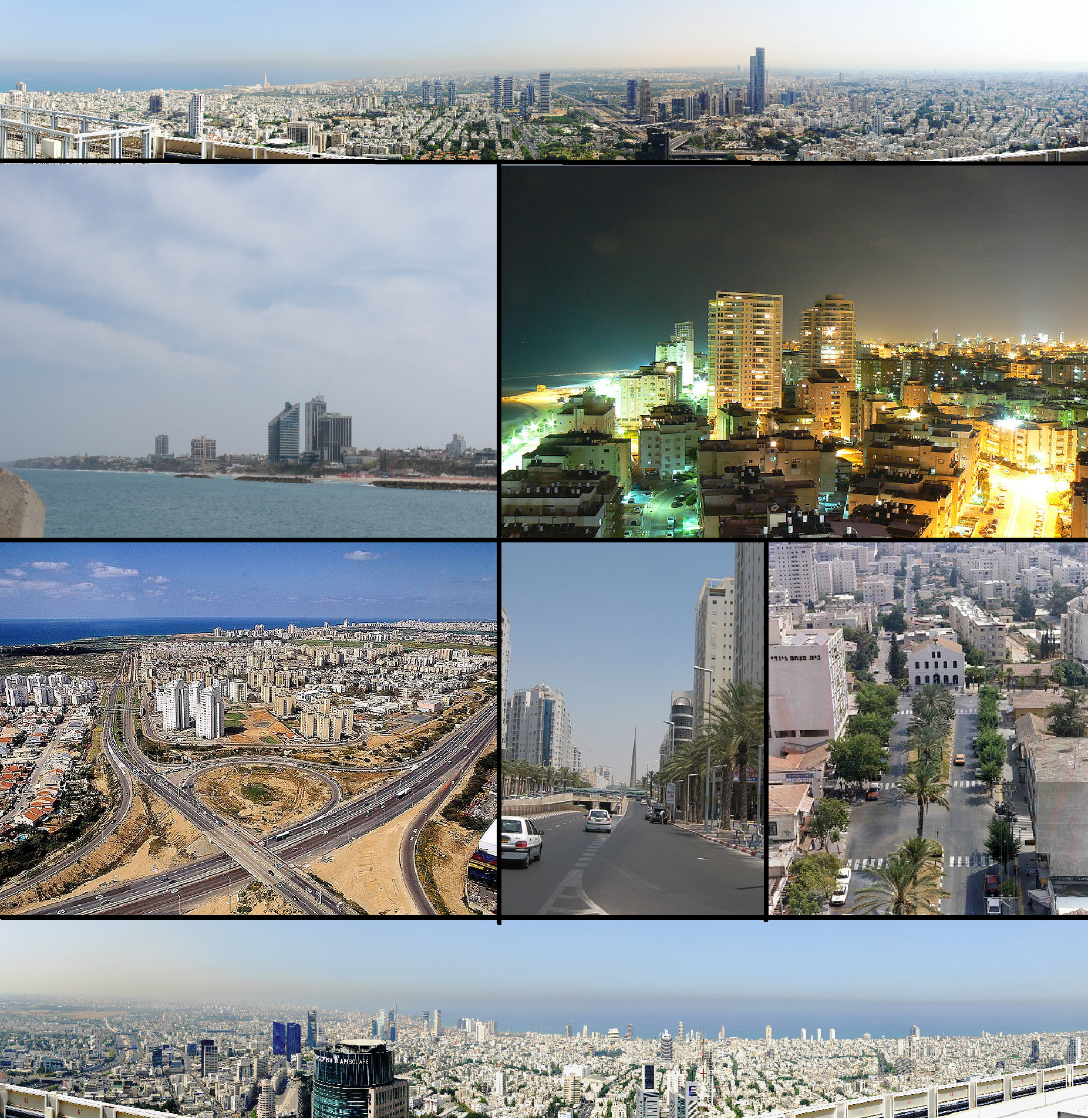
- From top left: Tel Aviv, Herzliya, Bat Yam, Netanya, Ashdod, Rishon LeZion, Southern Suburbs of Tel Aviv.
- Nickname: Dan Bloc (Gush Dan in Hebrew)
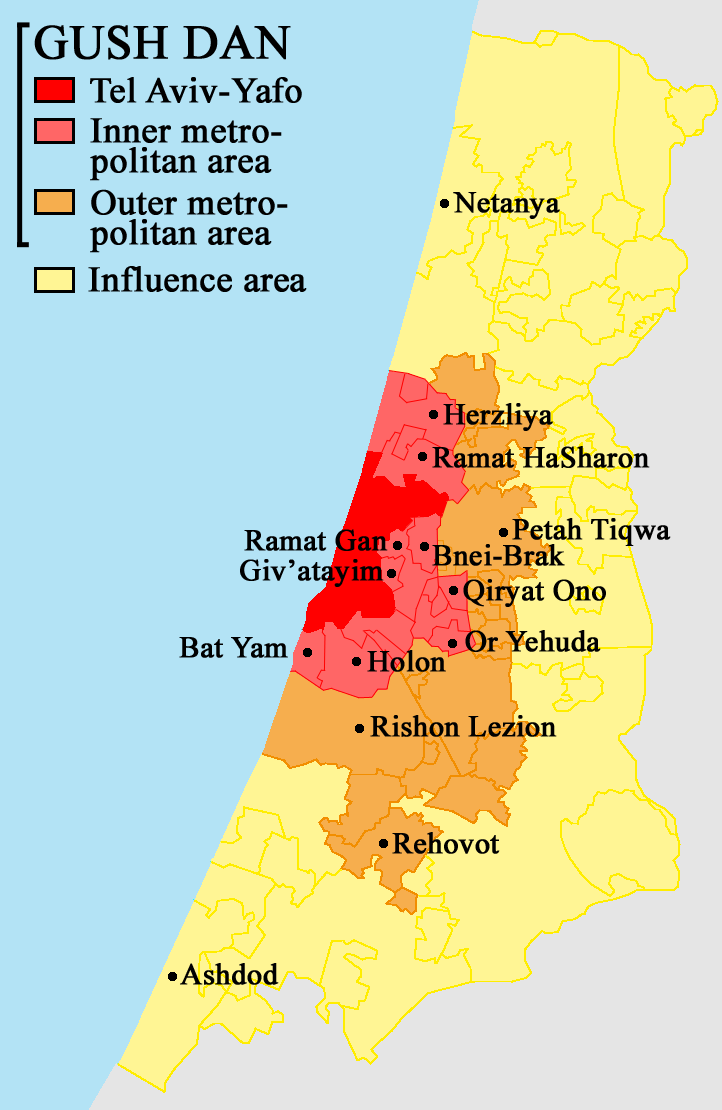
- Coordinates: 32°2′N 34°46′E
- Country: Israel
- Metropolitan Area: Gush Dan

Area
  - Total: 1,516 km^{2} (585 sq mi)

Population (31 December 2021)
  - Total: 4,156,900 (44% of Israel's population)
  - Metro density: 2,291/km^{2} (5,930/sq mi)
- Israeli Jews: 89.2% Israeli Arabs: 5.2% Others: 5.6%

GDP (nominal, 2025)
  - Total: US$360 billion
  - Per capita: US$86,600
- Time zone: UTC+2 (IST)
  - Summer (DST): UTC+3 (IDT)
- Postal code: 61999
- Area code: +972 (Israel)

Gush Dan (Hebrew: גּוּשׁ דָּן, lit. 'Dan bloc') or Tel Aviv metropolitan area is a major conurbation along Israel's Mediterranean coast. The term is commonly used by government bodies and the public, though its exact boundaries vary. It ranges from combining Tel Aviv with cities that form an urban continuum with it, to the entire areas from both the Tel Aviv District and the Central District, or sometimes the whole Metropolitan Area of Tel Aviv, which includes a small part of the Southern District as well. Gush Dan is the largest conurbation and metropolitan area in Israel and the center of Israel's financial and High technology sector. In 2021 the metropolitan area has an estimated population of 4,156,900 residents, 89% of whom are Israeli Jews.

== History ==
Historical population
Year	Pop.	±%
1946	343,000	—
1956	845,000	+146.4%
1966	1,291,000	+52.8%
1976	1,661,000	+28.7%
1986	2,036,000	+22.6%
1996	2,547,000	+25.1%
2006	3,098,000	+21.6%
2016	3,854,000	+24.4%

The name Gush Dan means "Dan Bloc", and is so named because the area was the territory of the tribe of Dan in the ancient Kingdom of Israel. According to the biblical narrative, the tribe had originally tried to settle in the central coastal area of Canaan, but enmity with the Philistines, who had already settled there, caused it to be able to camp only in the hill country overlooking the Sorek Valley. The camp location became known as Mahaneh Dan ("Camps of Dan"). The region that they attempted to settle included the area as far north as Jaffa and as far south as Shephelah in the area of Timnah. As a result of the pressure from the Philistines, the tribe abandoned hopes of settling near the central coast and instead migrated to the north of the country. After conquering Laish, the tribe refounded it as its capital and renamed it Dan. In remembrance of the original territory assignments, the coastal region is referred to as Gush Dan. The modern city of Tel Aviv was founded in 1909 as a suburb of the Arab-majority coastal city of Jaffa.

The city of Tel Aviv grew rapidly in the ensuing decades by Jewish immigration from Europe, with its population reaching 150,000 in 1934, and 230,000 when Israel gained its independence in 1948. Before the establishment of Israel, other towns in the Gush Dan were founded as well, such as Petah Tikva in 1878, Rishon LeZion in 1882, Ness Ziona in 1883, Rehovot in 1890, and most other Gush Dan cities were established before 1948.

In 1947, the Gush Dan had nearly 400,000 residents, comprising over half of the Jewish population of Mandatory Palestine. As such, almost all of it was included in the Jewish state proposed by the 1947 United Nations Partition Plan for Palestine. After the 1948 Arab–Israeli War, the Arab population of the region, which had been nearly 150,000 before the war, was reduced to around 10,000. Their population loss was quickly replaced by a larger number of Jews fleeing from postwar Europe and persecution in Arab countries.

However, many new immigrants did not then come to Tel Aviv. In the 1950s, towns were built on the edges of the Gush Dan, including Ashdod, Rosh HaAyin and Yavne. The nation's sole port was then located in the northern city of Haifa and its evolving metropolitan area, making that city at least as important as Tel Aviv. The new government was then trying to disperse the nation's population to the periphery and discouraged settlement in the already-populated Gush Dan. That slowed the growth of the Gush Dan, but the area still more than doubled in population within 20 years of the establishment of Israel. The opening of the Port of Ashdod in the southern Gush Dan also increased the area's importance, with the importance of Haifa diminishing and that of Tel Aviv increasing because of its proximity. Tel Aviv itself witnessed population decreases in the 1970s and 1980s, when outer regions of the Gush Dan with lower costs of living absorbed many of the people who had left Tel Aviv.

Only in the 1990s, with the immigration of more than 1 million Jews from former Soviet Republics, 40,000 Ethiopian Jews, and many others to Israel, as well as a boom in the religious population, would Tel Aviv begin to grow again. The demand for housing increased dramatically, with new cities such as Modiin and El'ad being built, and cities like Ashdod more than doubling in population, from 83,000 in 1990, to 175,000 in 2000. In the 2000s, the area continued to grow, attracting many immigrants from the Haifa metropolitan area. Today Gush Dan is the commercial, economical, cultural, and industrial center of Israel.

The Tel Aviv urban conurbation, stretching from Netanya to Ashdod, concentrates the largest Jewish population globally, nearing 3.9 million Jews. This figure significantly surpasses the Jewish population of the New York metropolitan area, which ranks second with 2.1 million Jews. Despite some successes in ongoing attempts by the Israeli government to encourage migration to the Galilee and the Negev, Gush Dan retains its position as the heart of Israel.

== Cities in Gush Dan ==
Population in cities as of the end of 2021:

Over 400,000

- Tel Aviv-Yafo 494,900

Over 200,000

- Rishon LeZion 259,275
- Petah Tikva 270,403
- Bnei Brak 229,996

Over 100,000

- Holon 191,829
- Ramat Gan 172,242
- Rehovot 155,049
- Bat Yam 129,494
- Herzliya 110,884
- Kfar Saba 99,410

Over 50,000

- Lod 94,189
- Ra'anana 82,964
- Ramla 86,052
- Rosh HaAyin 79,023
- Hod HaSharon 66,398
- Givatayim 58,601
- Yavne 58,090
- Ness Ziona 47,267

Over 20,000

- El'ad 50,846
- Ramat HaSharon 48,860
- Tayibe 46,870
- Kiryat Ono 45,049
- Yehud-Monosson
- Gedera 31,389
- Be'er Ya'akov 37,491
- Giv'at Shmuel 29,405
- Kfar Yona 29,820
- Tira 27,680
- Kafr Qasim 27,996
- Gan Yavne 25,144
- Qalansawe 25,167
- Kadima-Tzoran 22,655
- Ganei Tikva 25,488
- Shoham 23,592

Over 10,000

- Mazkeret Batya 16,334
- Even Yehuda 15,370
- Tel Mond 14,771
- Kiryat Ekron 11,283
- Jaljulia 10,992
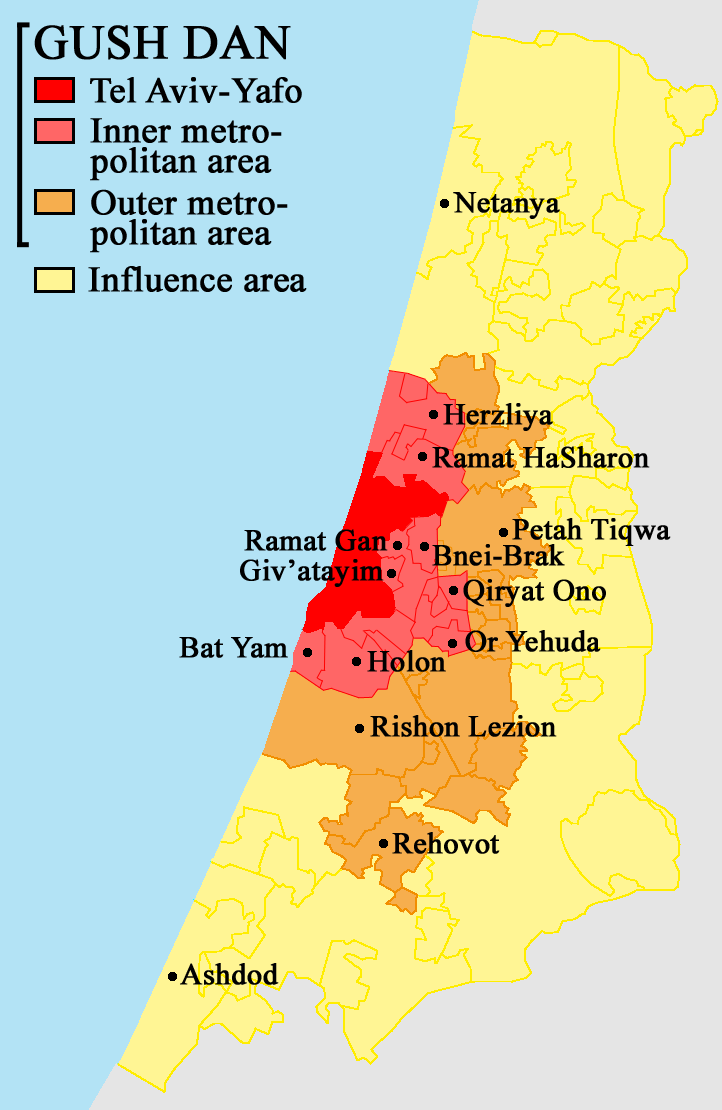
Map of the Gush Dan

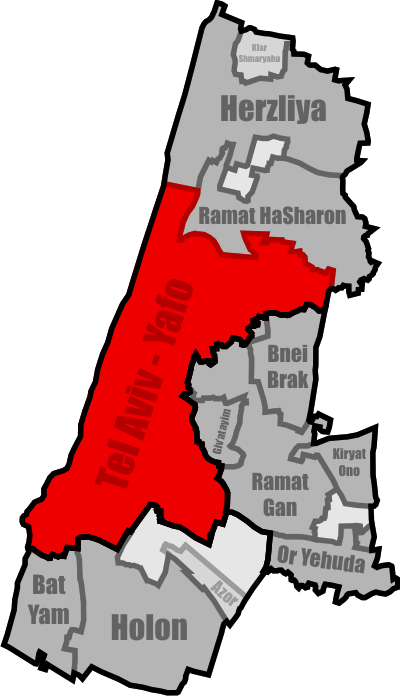
Map of inner metropolitan area

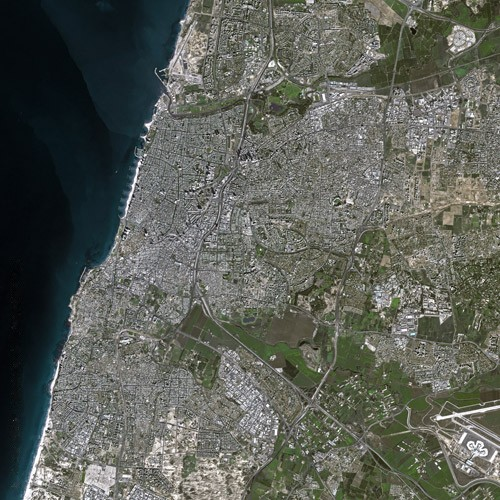
Satellite Image of the Inner Ring of the Gush Dan

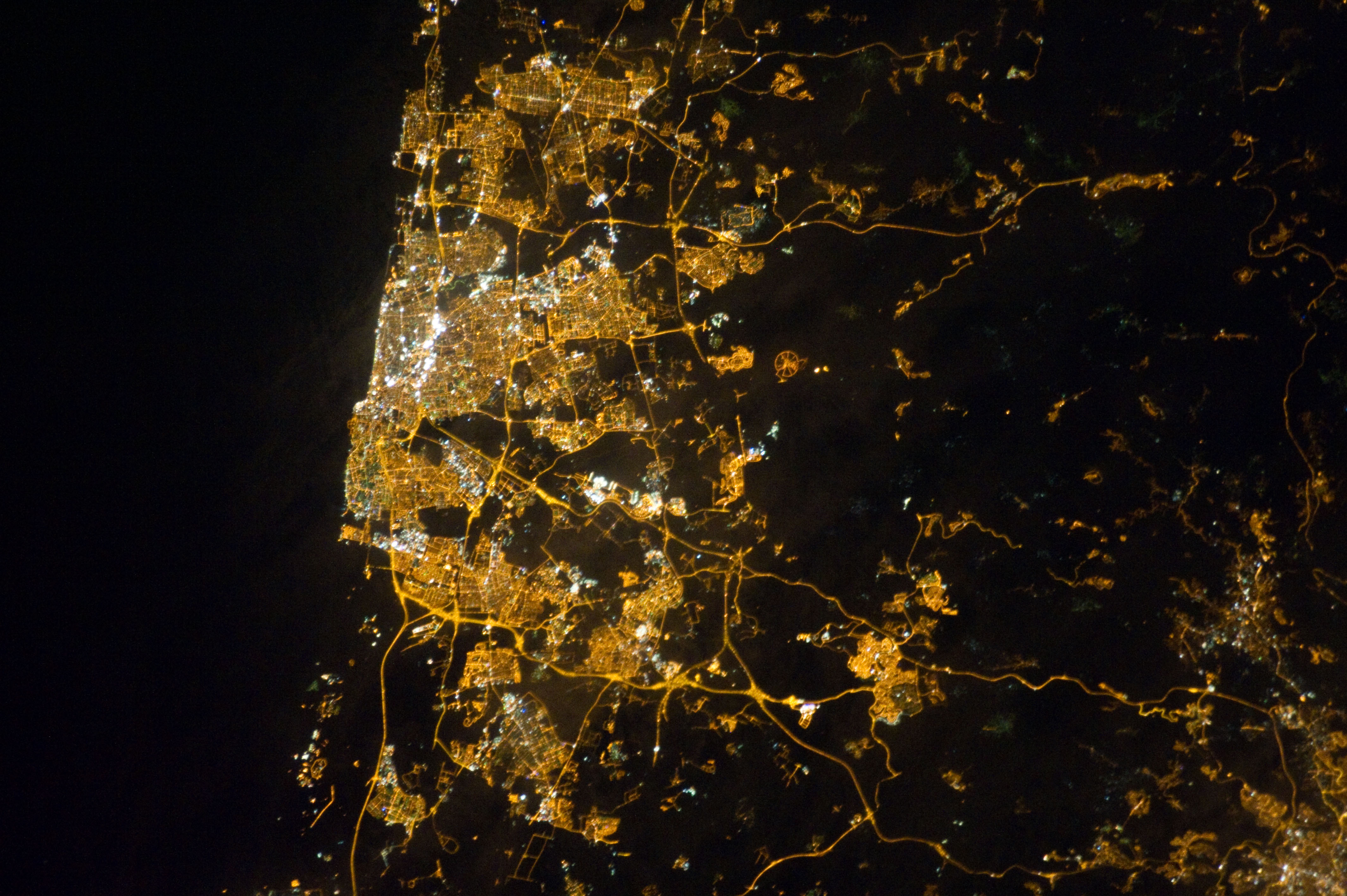
NASA photo of Tel Aviv area at night

== Metropolitan rings ==
Israel Central Bureau of Statistics divides the Tel Aviv metropolitan area into four:

Metropolitan rings in the Tel Aviv metropolitan area
Metropolitan ring	Localities	Population (EOY 2018 estimate)				Population density (per km²)	Annual Population growth rate
Metropolitan ring	Localities	Total	Jews and others^{1}	Thereof: Jews	Arabs	Population density (per km²)	Annual Population growth rate
Core^{2}	1	451,500	431,100	407,200	20,400	8,718.6	1.7%
Inner Ring^{3}	13	975,600	973,700	911,900	2,000	8,097	1.4%
Northern Section	4	144,300	144,100	138,800	200	3,327.4	1.3%
Eastern Section	5	495,100	494,400	479,600	700	12,394.3	1.9%
Southern Section	4	336,300	335,200	293,500	1,100	9,042.2	0.6%
Middle Ring^{4}	31	1,219,800	1,177,300	1,108,100	42,500	4,157.4	1.6%
Northern Section	6	239,500	239,200	232,300	300	4,567.4	1.3%
Eastern Section	8	325,700	325,300	304,400	400	4,558.6	1.7%
Southern Section	17	654,500	612,800	571,500	41,800	3,861.5	1.7%
Outer Ring^{5}	258	1,338,000	1,200,200	1,140,700	137,800	1,052.9	2%
Northern Section	97	497,100	397,300	375,100	99,800	1,284.9	1.3%
Eastern Section	47	294,700	258,000	254,200	36,700	1,056.4	3.3%
Southern Section	91	453,300	452,600	424,200	700	877.3	1.4%
Judea and Samaria Section^{6}	23	93,000	92,300	87,200	600	–	4.3%
Total	303	3,984,900	3,782,300	3,567,900	202,700	2,361.4	1.7%

Notes
- ^{1} The population of "Jews and others" includes Israeli Jews, non-Arab Christians and those not classified by religion.
- ^{2} The core area includes the city of Tel Aviv.
- ^{3} The inner ring includes the cities Bat Yam, Holon, Ramat HaSharon, Ramat Gan, Giv'atayim, Bnei Brak, Herzliya, Or Yehuda, Giv'at Shmuel and Kiryat Ono, as well as a multitude of smaller towns (local councils).
- ^{4} The middle ring includes the cities Petah Tikva, Ra'anana, Rishon LeZion, Hod HaSharon, Kfar Saba, Yehud, Ramla, Lod, Rosh HaAyin, Ness Ziona and Rehovot, as well as many smaller towns (local councils).
- ^{5} The outer ring includes the cities Tayibe, Netanya, Modi'in-Maccabim-Re'ut, Ashdod, as well as many smaller towns (local councils).
- ^{6} Judea and Samaria Section refers to Israeli West Bank settlements and it includes the settlements of Alfei Menashe and Ari'el, as well as many smaller settlements. The international community considers Israeli settlements in the West Bank illegal under international law, but the Israeli government disputes this. The statistic does not however include the Palestinian localities located east of the Green Line.

== Business and commercial districts ==
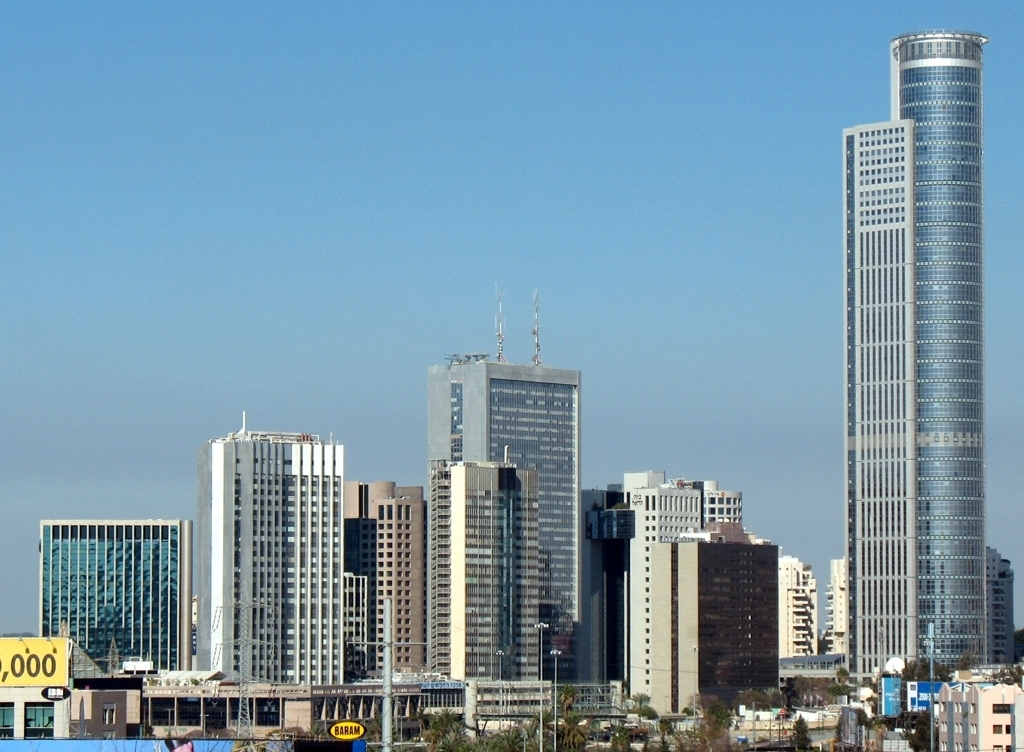
Diamond Exchange District

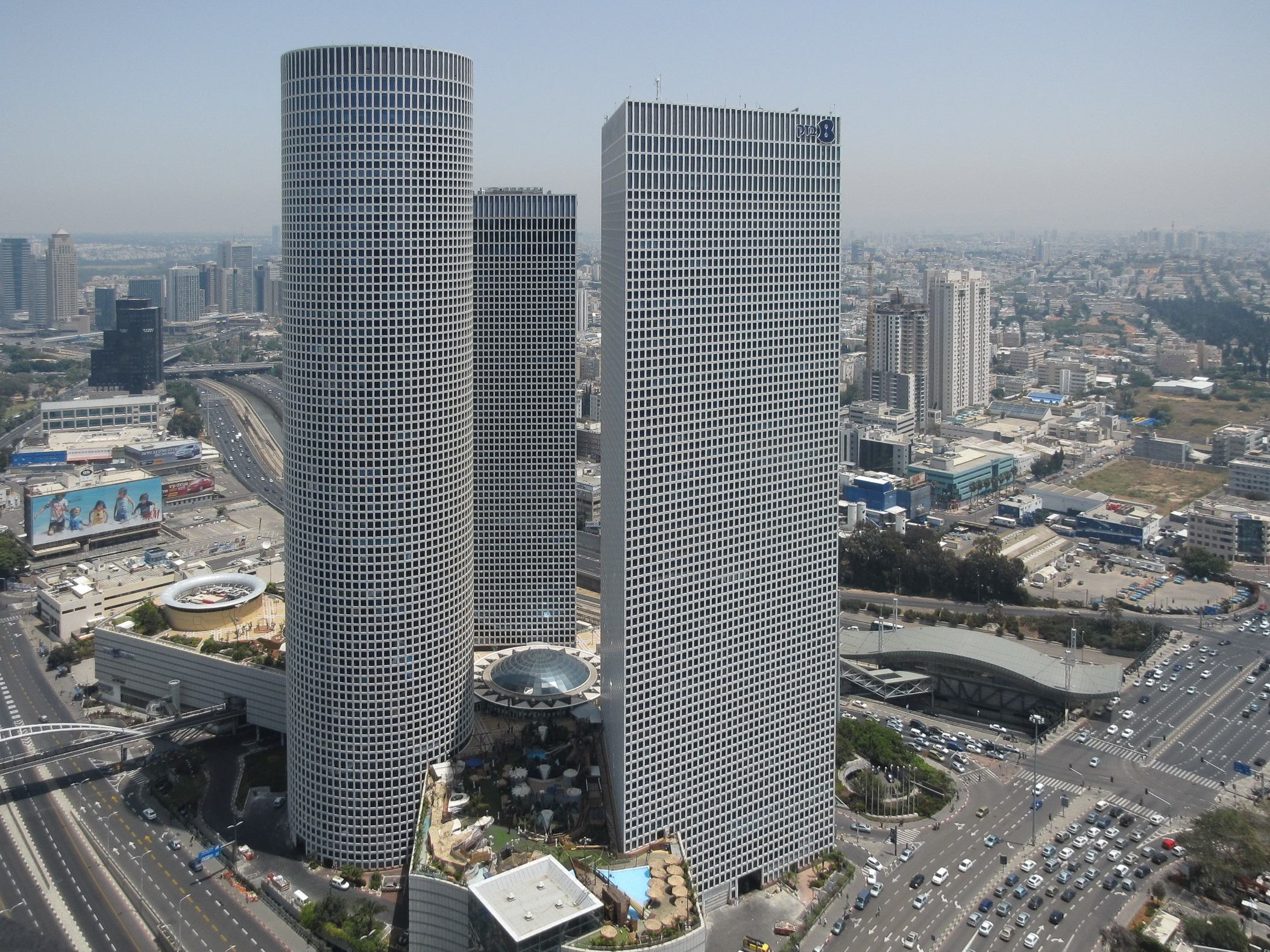
Azrieli Center

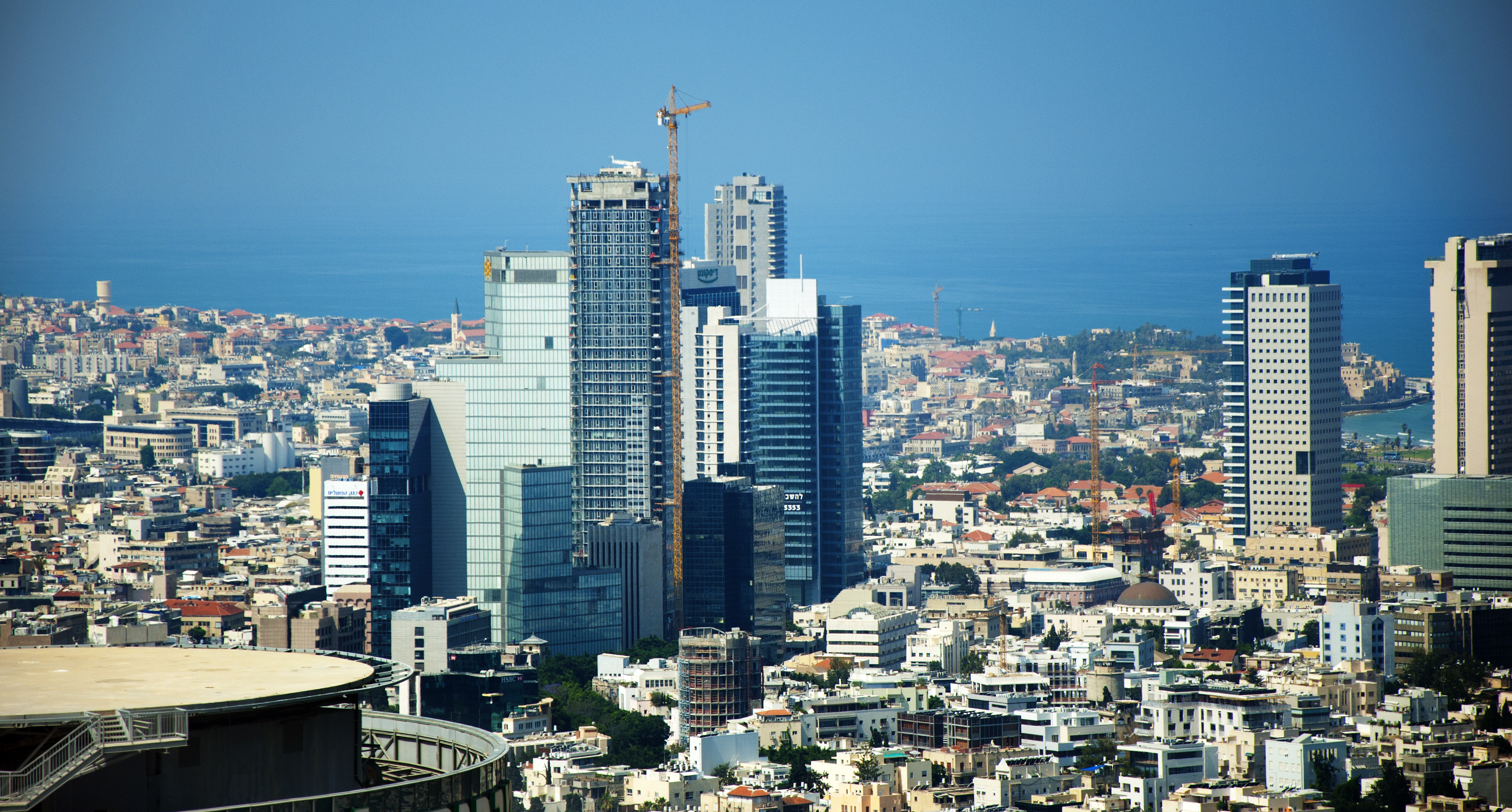
Towers on Rothschild Boulevard

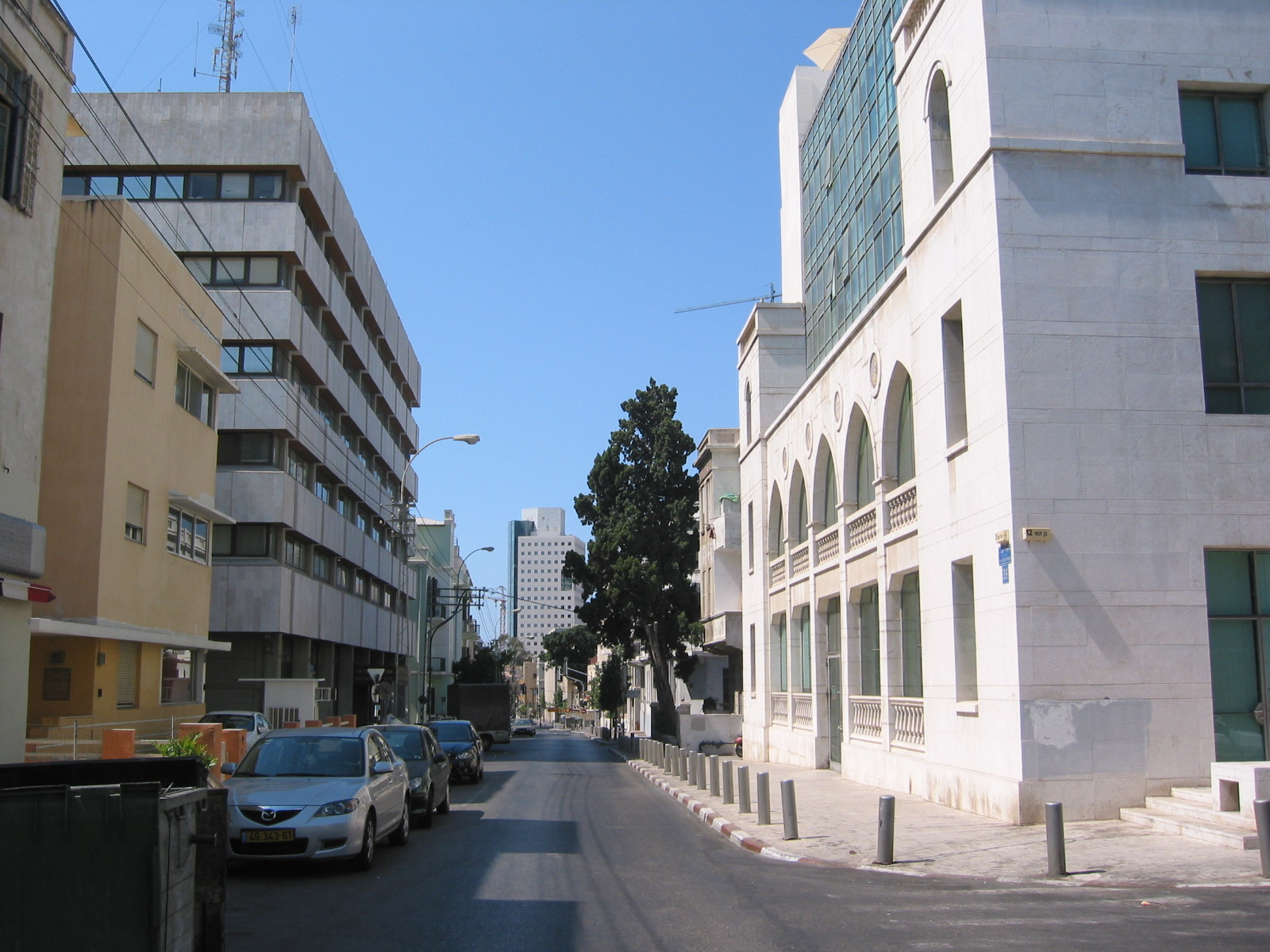
Tel Aviv Stock Exchange (old building)

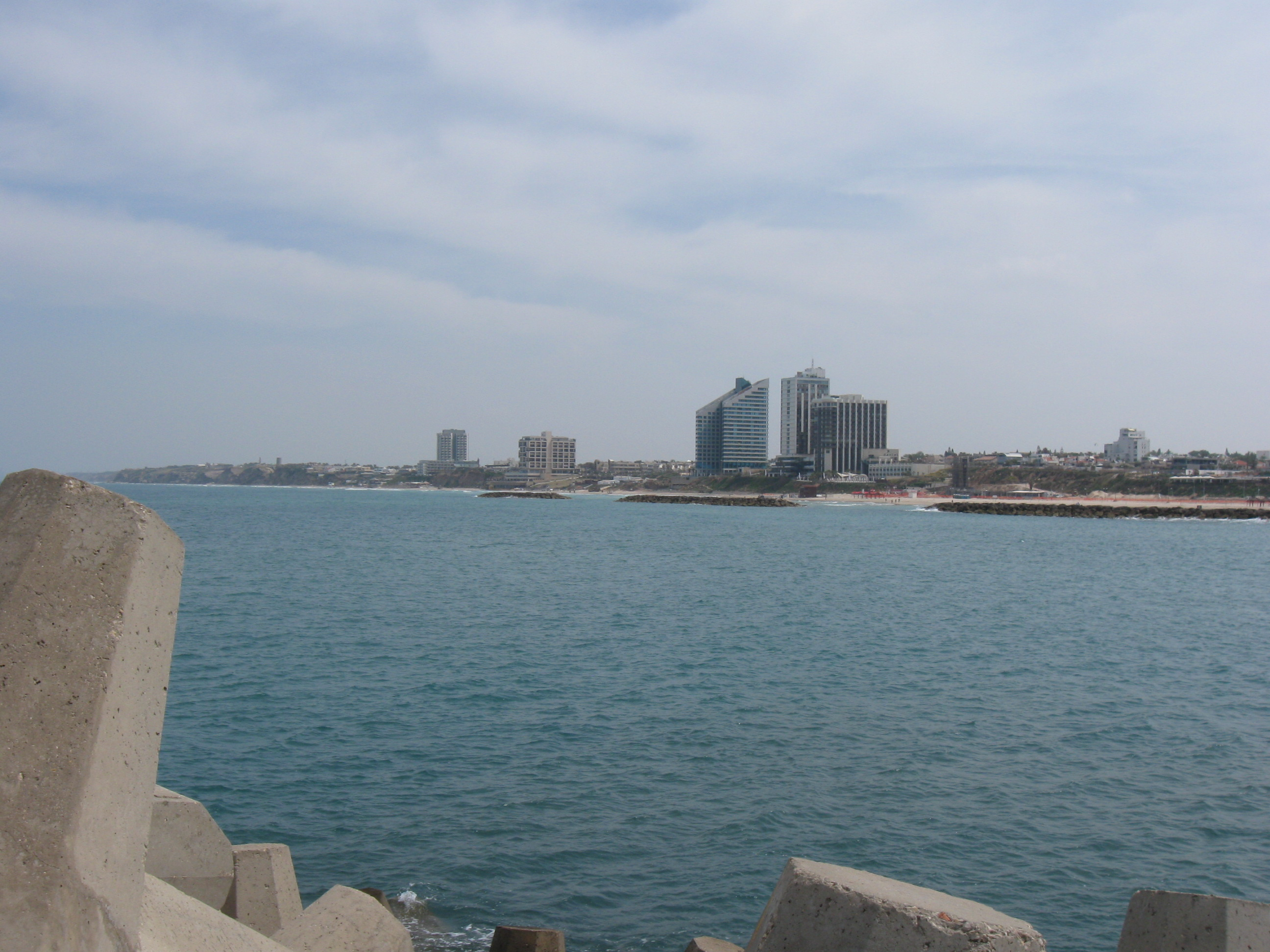
Herzliya Pituah strip from the Marina

- Diamond Exchange District – Ramat Gan – The Diamond Exchange District is in the city of Ramat Gan. Bordering the Ayalon Highway, the road dividing Ramat Gan and Tel Aviv, the district is home to Israel's diamond industry as well as being a major commercial center. The Diamond Exchange itself contains four buildings (towers) connected by bridges; the Maccabi Tower, Shimshon Tower, Noam Tower, and Diamond Tower, which contains the world's largest diamond trading floor and is the main building of the Diamond Exchange. The district also has a number of other important buildings. The Moshe Aviv Tower is Israel's second tallest (and formerly its tallest) building at 244 meters. Opposite, Exchange Ramat Gan is currently under construction, set to include a pair of skyscrapers and a commercial area between them. The Sheraton City Tower is a hotel in the district, whilst other notable buildings are the Ayalon Tower and Gibor Sport House.
- Dizengoff Square – Tel Aviv – Dizengoff Center (Hebrew: דיזנגוף סנטר) is a shopping mall in central Tel Aviv, host to about 140,000 visitors weekly. Lying south of Dizengoff Square, it is named for Meir Dizengoff, the first mayor of Tel Aviv. The first mall in Tel Aviv, the center opened in 1983. It is divided into two parts and straddles both sides of Dizengoff Street with the two parts linked by a pair of skywalks. The mall is bordered by Dizengoff Street, King George Street and the smaller Tchernichovsky street.
- Port of Ashdod – Ashdod – The Port of Ashdod is one of Israel's two main cargo ports. The port is located in Ashdod, about 40 kilometers south of Tel Aviv, adjoining the mouth of the Lachish River. Its establishment doubled the country's port capacity.
- Rothschild Boulevard – Tel Aviv – Rothschild Boulevard (Hebrew: שְׂדֵרוֹת רוטשילד, Sderot Rothschild) is a street in Tel Aviv beginning in Neve Tzedek at its southwestern edge and running north to Habima Theatre. It is one of the busiest and most expensive streets in the Gush Dan, being one of the city's main tourist attractions.
- Azrieli Center – Tel Aviv – Azrieli Center is a complex of skyscrapers in Tel Aviv. At the base of the center lies a large shopping mall. The center was originally designed by Israeli-American architect Eli Attia, and after he fell out with the developer of the center David Azrieli (after whom it is named), completion of the design was passed on to the Tel Aviv firm of Moore Yaski Sivan Architects.
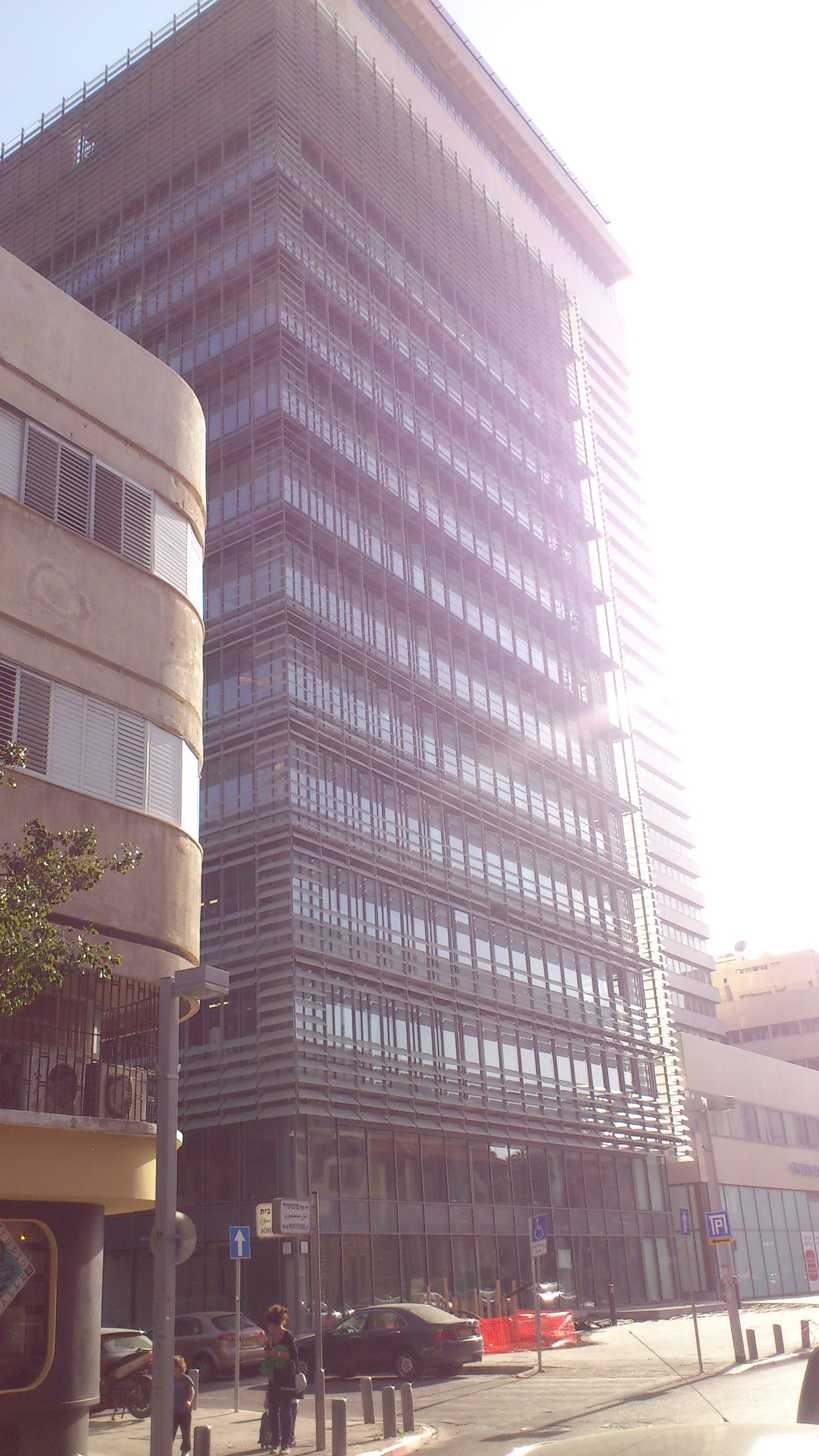
- The new Tel Aviv Stock Exchange
  Tel Aviv Stock Exchange – Tel Aviv – The Tel Aviv Stock Exchange (TASE; Hebrew: הבורסה לניירות ערך בתל אביב; colloquially known as the Boursa) is Israel's only stock exchange. The TASE is the only public market for trading securities in Israel. It plays a major role in the Israeli economy. TASE lists some 622 companies, about 60 of which are also listed on stock exchanges in other countries. TASE also lists some 180 exchange-traded funds (ETFs), 60 government bonds, 500 corporate bonds, and more than 1000 mutual funds. 29 companies are members of the TASE, of which 14 are banks. The list of members indicates that Altshuler Shaham Ltd is a candidate for membership.
- Tel Aviv Promenade – Tel Aviv – The Tel Aviv promenade runs along its beaches, and is an integral part of the city's lifestyle, as well as a major tourist attraction. Most of the city's bathing beaches and hiking paths are concentrated in the central part of its 14 kilometers of Mediterranean shore. It contains numerous hotels and commercial buildings.
- Kiryat Atidim – Tel Aviv – high tech center in eastern Ramat HaHayal. The district is known for its ultra modern architecture.
- Bat Yam coastal strip – Bat Yam - southward extension of the Tel Aviv Promenade
- Herzliya Pituah coastal strip and industrial area – Herzliya – northward extension of the Tel Aviv Promenade
- Kiryat Aryeh, Kiryat Matalon, and Segula Industrial Zones – (These three form the second largest industrial zone in the country after Haifa) – Petah Tikva
- Ben Gurion Airport Industrial Zone – Lod
- Eastern Industrial Sector – Holon
- Eastern Industrial Zones – Netanya
- Poleg industrial area – Netanya

== Higher education ==
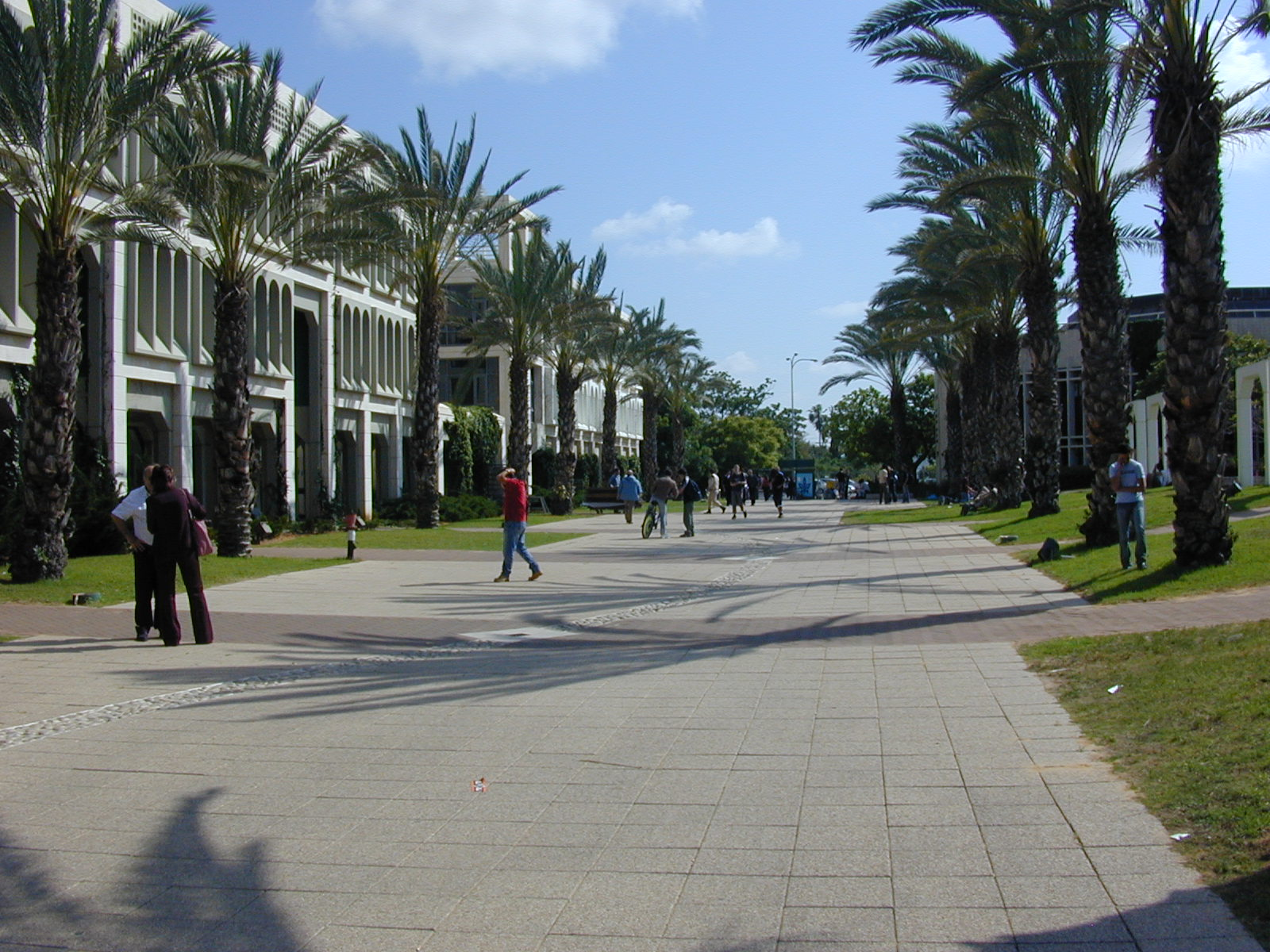
Tel Aviv University

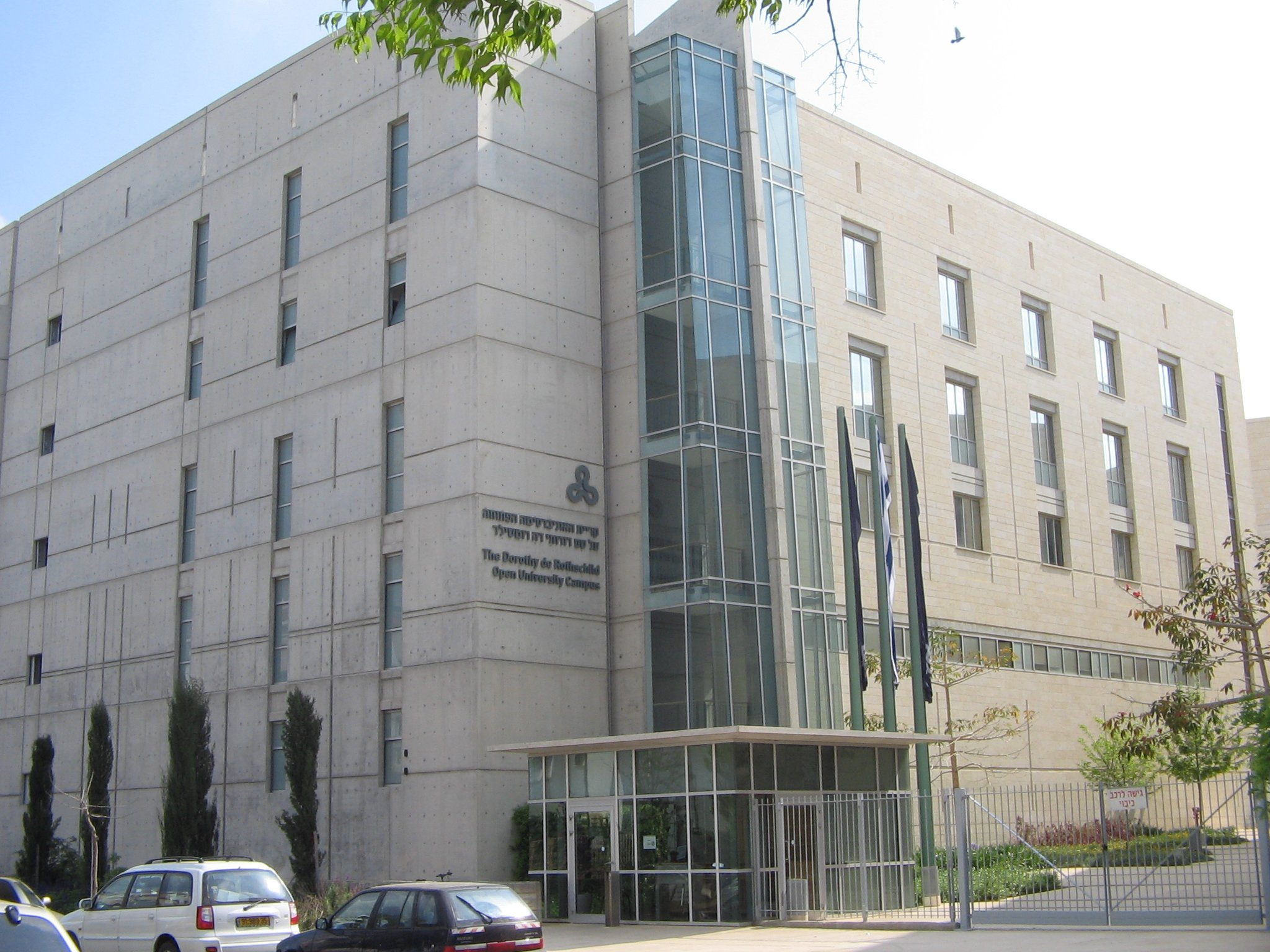
Open University of Israel

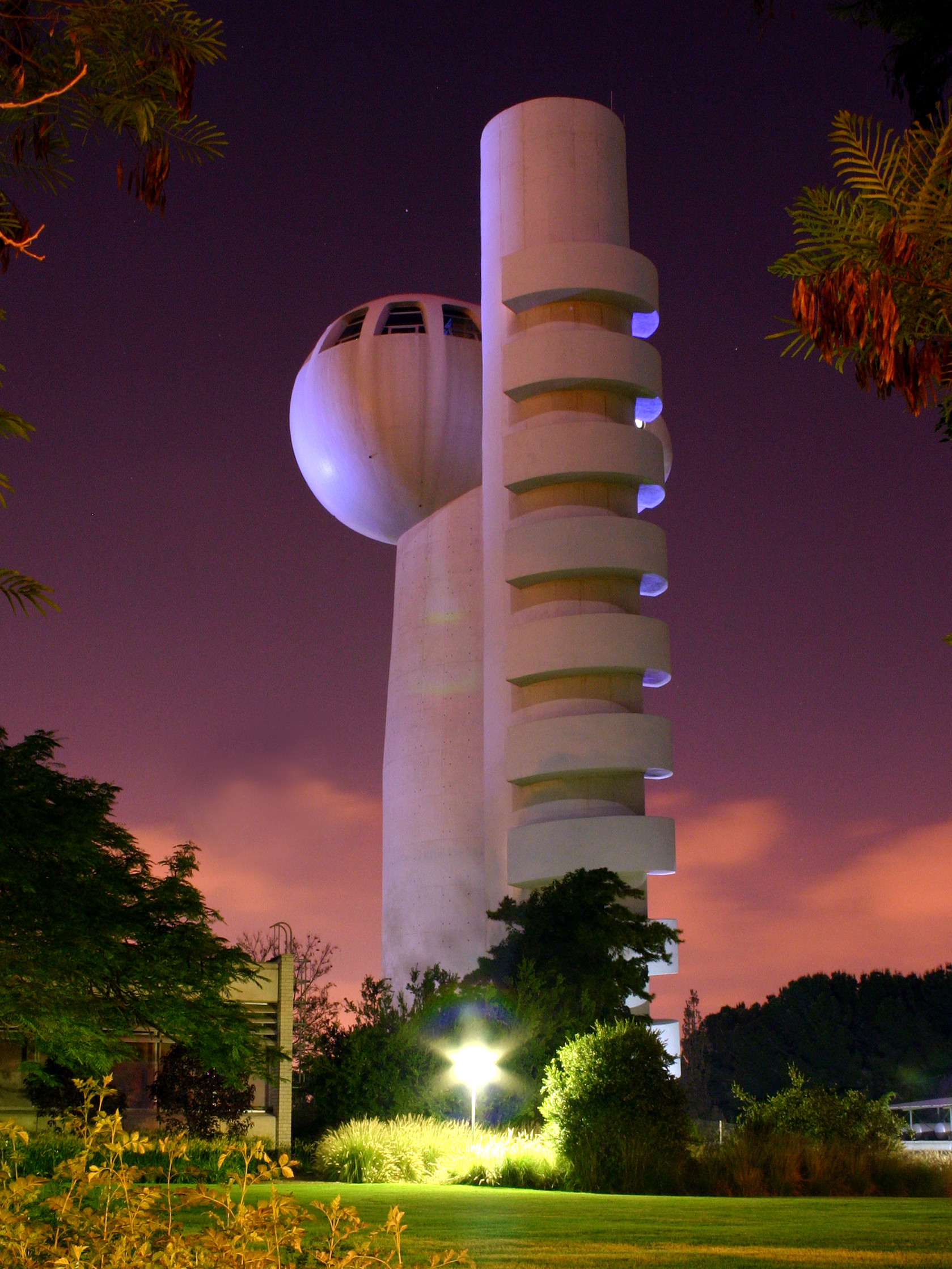
Weizmann Institute of Science

Universities

- Tel Aviv University (TAU) (Tel Aviv) – 30,000 students
- Bar-Ilan University (BIU) (Ramat Gan) – 27,000 students
- Open University of Israel (OPENU) (Ra'anana) – 40,000 students
- Weizmann Institute of Science (WIS) (Rehovot) – 700 students
- Hebrew University of Jerusalem – Based in Jerusalem - maintains a campus in Rehovot which includes The Faculty of Agriculture and the School of Veterinary Medicine.
- Reichman University (formerly the Interdisciplinary Center, or IDC), Herzliya

Colleges

- Academic Center of Law and Business, Ramat Gan
- Academic College of Tel Aviv–Yafo, Tel Aviv
- Bezalel Academy of Art and Design
- College of Management (COLMAN), Rishon LeZion
- Holon Institute of Technology
- Jerusalem College of Technology
- Netanya Academic College
- Netanya Academic College of Law
- Ono Academic College
- The Center for Academic Studies in Or Yehuda
- Shenkar College of Engineering and Design
- College of Technology Education, Tel Aviv
- Kibbutzim College of Education, Tel Aviv
- Levinsky College of Education, Tel Aviv
- Mofet, Consortium of Colleges of Education
- Moreshet Yaakov Religious College of Education, Rehovot
- Ort College for Teachers of Technology, Tel Aviv
- Talpiot College of Education, Tel Aviv

== Museums ==
- Tel Aviv Museum of Art
- Ramat Gan Museum of Israeli Art
- Bauhaus Center Tel Aviv
- Max Liebling House (Beit Liebling)
- Haganah Museum
- Petah Tikva Museum of Art
- Holon Design Museum
- Eretz Israel Museum (Land of Israel Museum)
- Anu – Museum of the Jewish People

== Amenities ==
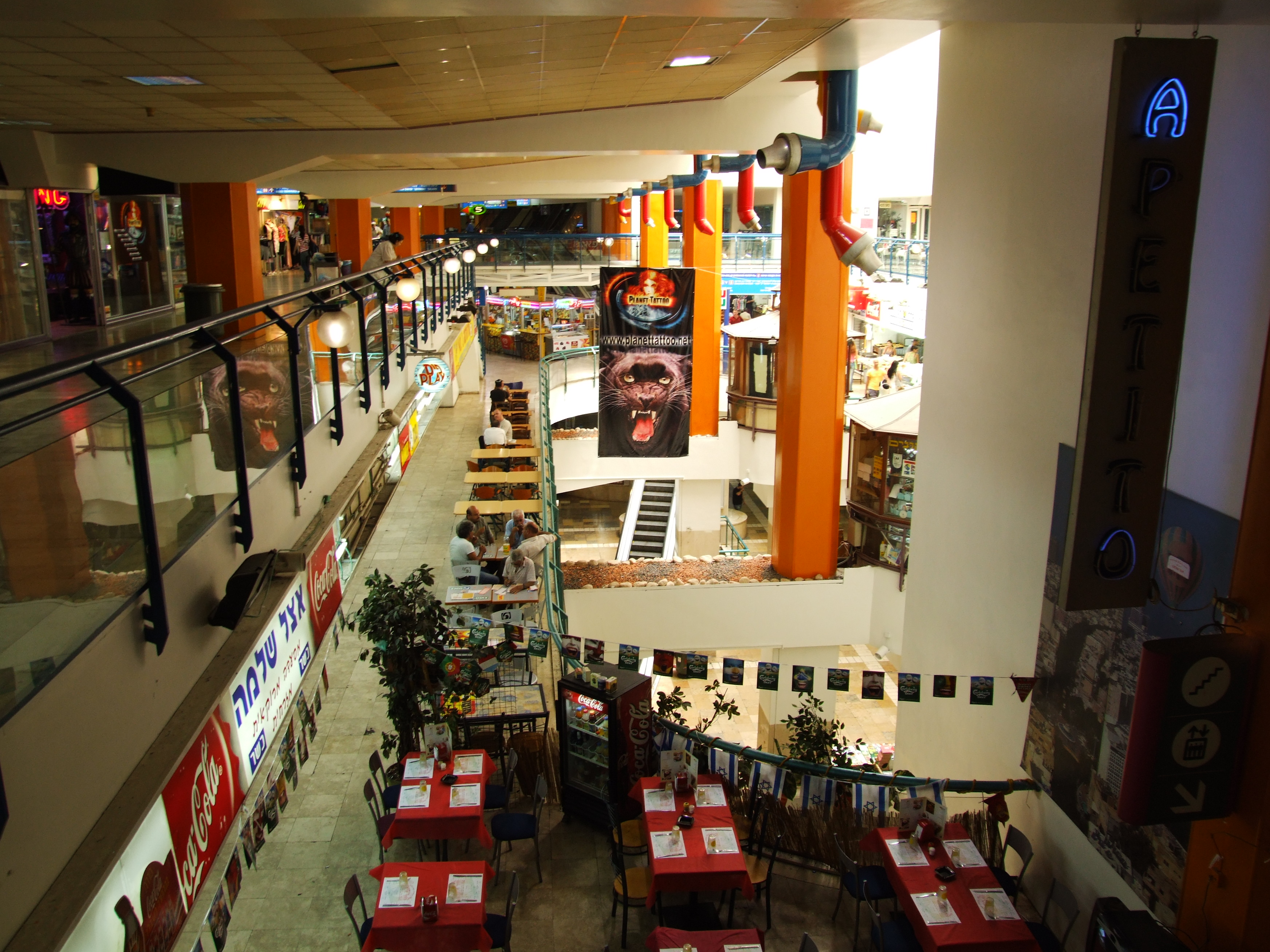
A view from the sixth floor of the mall at Tel Aviv Central Bus Station

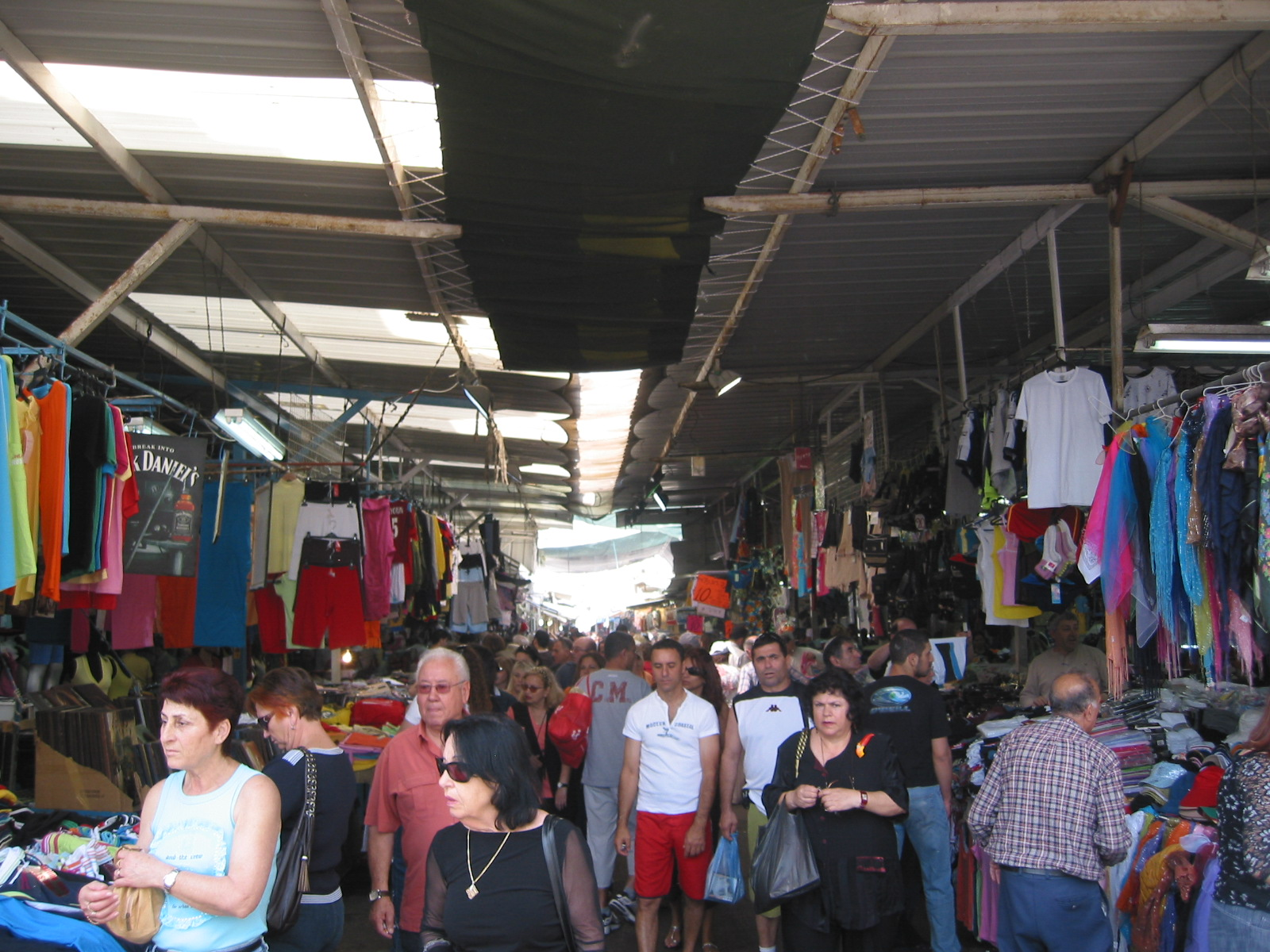
Carmel Market

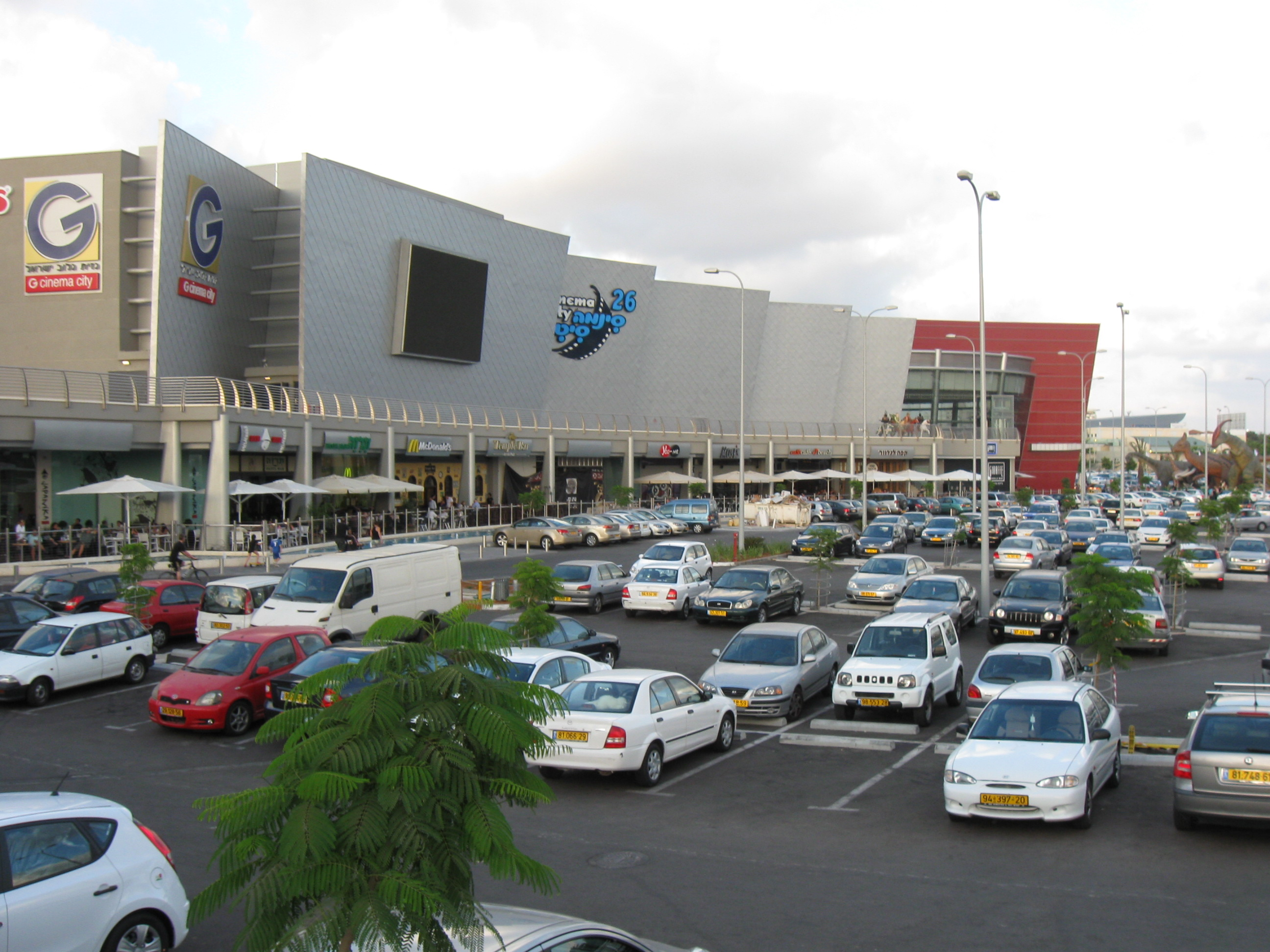
G Cinema City in Rishon LeZion

- Carmel Market
- Ramat Aviv Mall
- Azrieli Center
- Dizengoff Center
- Tel Aviv Central Bus Station
- Opera Tower
- London Ministores Mall

== Transportation ==
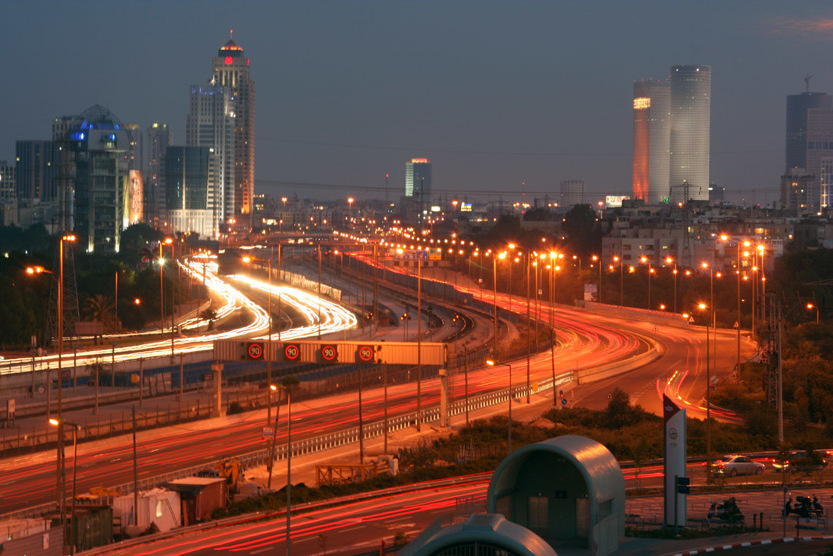
Ayalon Highway separates Tel Aviv and Ramat Gan

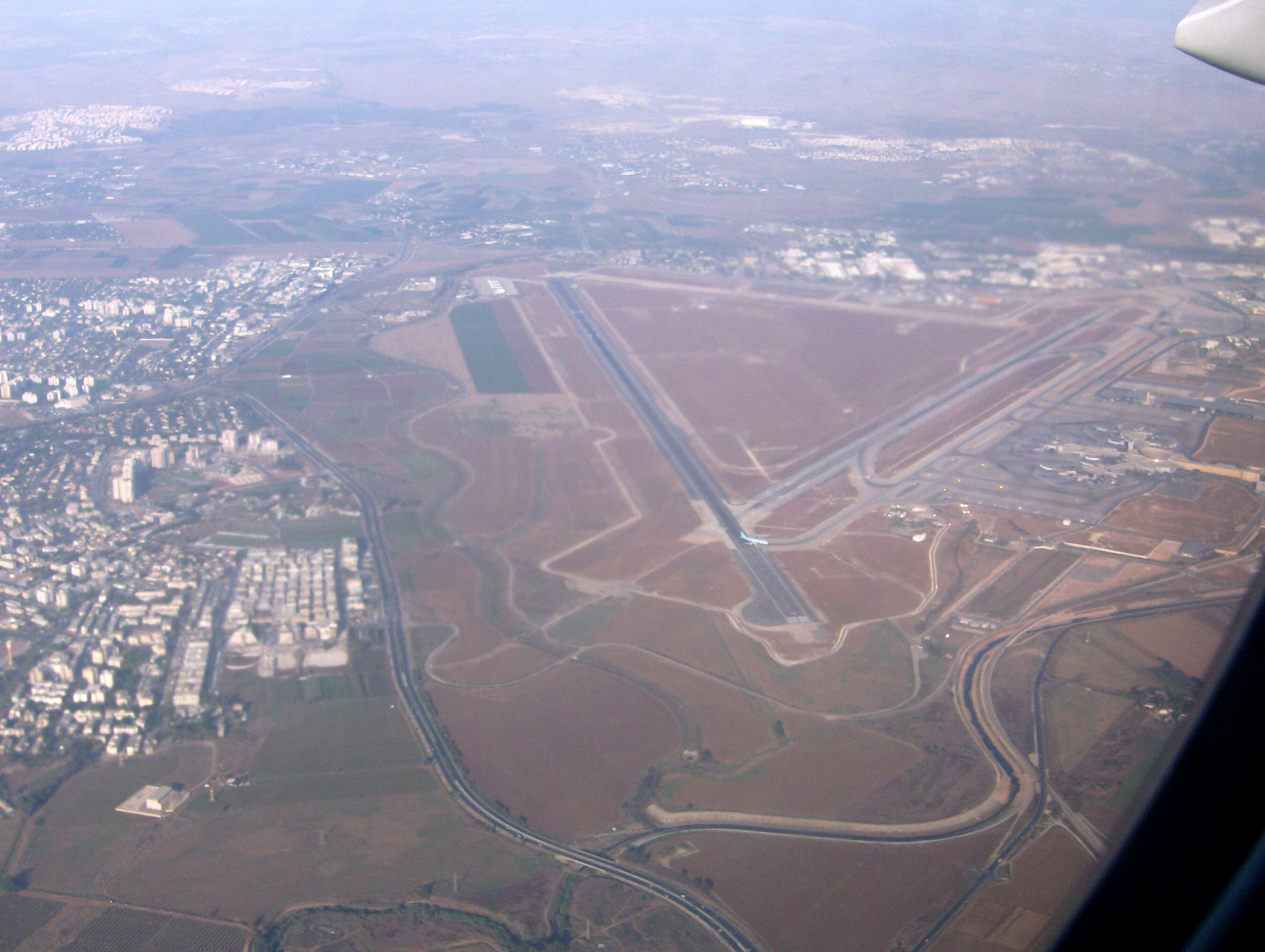
Ben Gurion International Airport

The Dan Bus Company is primarily focused on serving the Gush Dan, although it is being replaced by the Kavim company in many of the Gush Dan's cities. Much of Israel's national highway network feeds into the area, such as Highway 1, Highway 2, Highway 4, and Highway 5. Gush Dan is also served by the local Ayalon Highway. Israel Railways, the state owned, national rail network provider, also feeds most traffic into or within the Gush Dan region. The Tel Aviv Light Rail is also a major feature in the regions transport, as well as the high speed service to Jerusalem. Two airports are located in the Gush Dan; Sde Dov Airport which closed at 2019, and Ben Gurion International Airport in Lod which is Israel's largest airport handles over 22 million passengers a year and offers flights to destinations in Europe, Africa, Asia, and The Americas. The Tel Aviv Metro is a planned subway system to the region which will feature three lines, with the first public opening planned in 2032.

== Highways ==
Some of the major freeways/expressways carrying commuter traffic in and out of the Tel Aviv Metropolitan Area are:

- Highway 20 (also called Ayalon Highway) – a major intracity freeway in Gush Dan, which runs along Tel Aviv's center eastern border from north to south.
- Highway 1 – connects Tel Aviv with Jerusalem.
- Highway 2 (also called The Coastal Highway) – stretches from Tel Aviv to Haifa. It is one of the busiest highways in Israel.
- Highway 4 (also called Geha Highway, or First President Road) – a major north–south highway connecting Ra'anana and Kfar Saba in the North to Petah Tikva and Ramat Gan in the center and Ashdod in the South.
- Highway 5 – connects the Mediterranean coast immediately north of Tel Aviv with the central Sharon plain and Ariel and other Israeli settlements in the northern West Bank.
- Highway 44 – connects Tel Aviv with Ramla, Lod and the Shefela.
- Highway 6 – a new north–south tollway running east of Gush Dan from Galilee in the north to Beer Sheva in the south.

== See also ==
- List of cities in Israel

== Panoramas ==
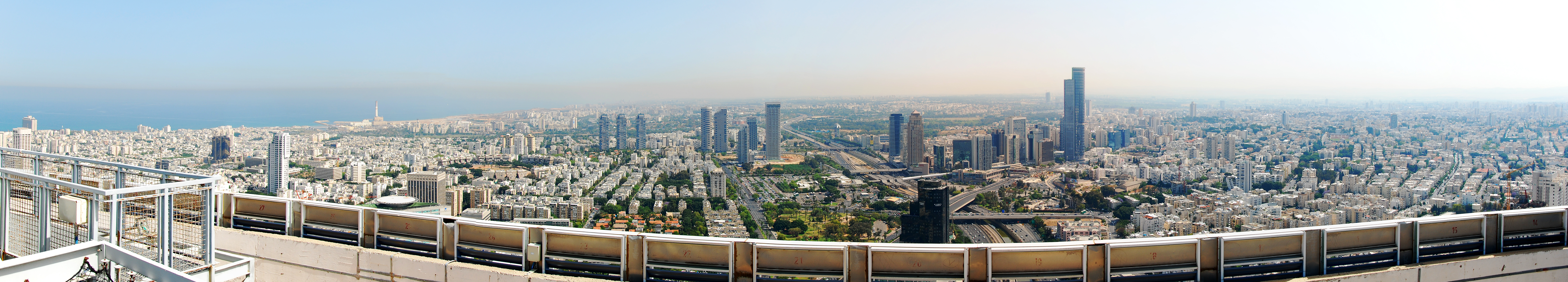
Skyline of Tel Aviv, Ramat Gan, Bnei Brak, and Herzliyya taken from the Azrieli Center
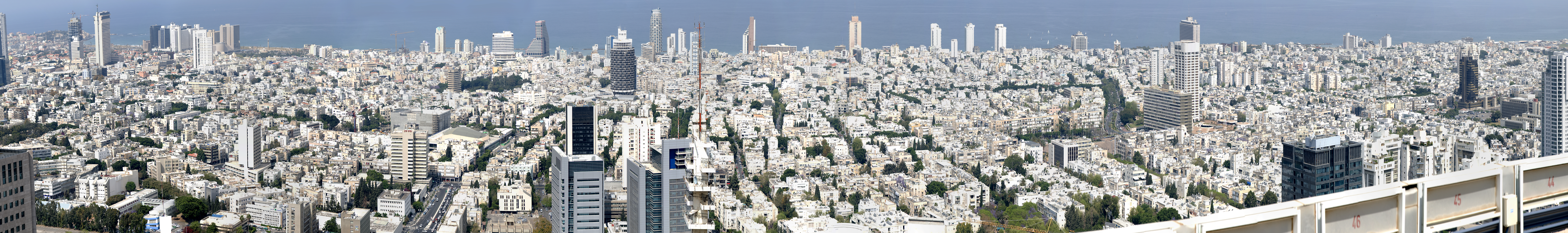
Skyline of Tel Aviv taken from the Azrieli Center
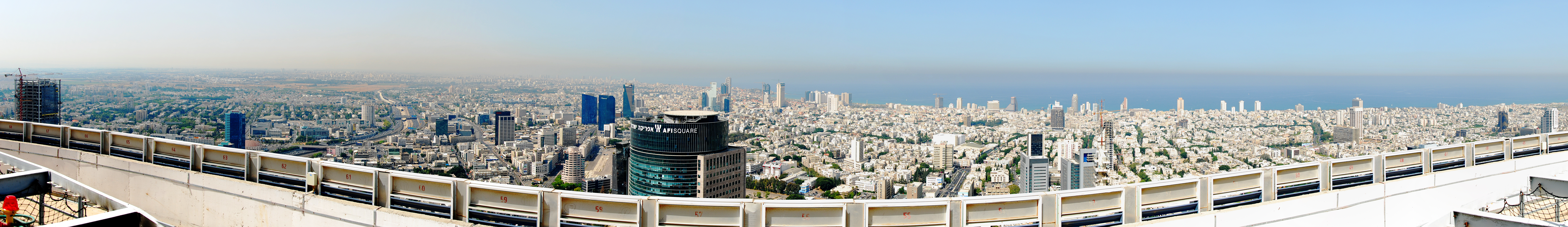
Skyline of Tel Aviv, Bat Yam, Holon, Givatayim, and Ramat Gan taken from the Azrieli Center
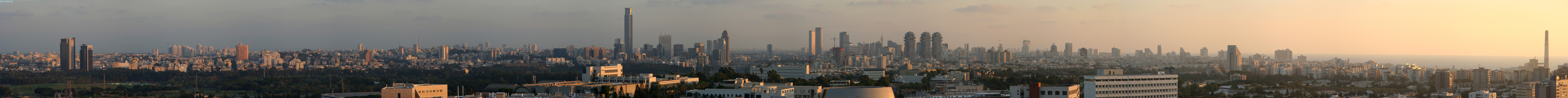
Tel Aviv and Ramat Gan, looking from Tel Aviv University
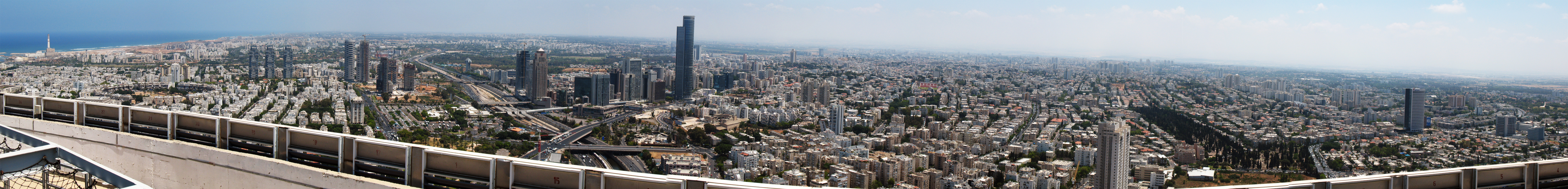
Tel Aviv panorama
