= Dan Tichon =

Israeli politician (1937–2024)

- דן תיכון
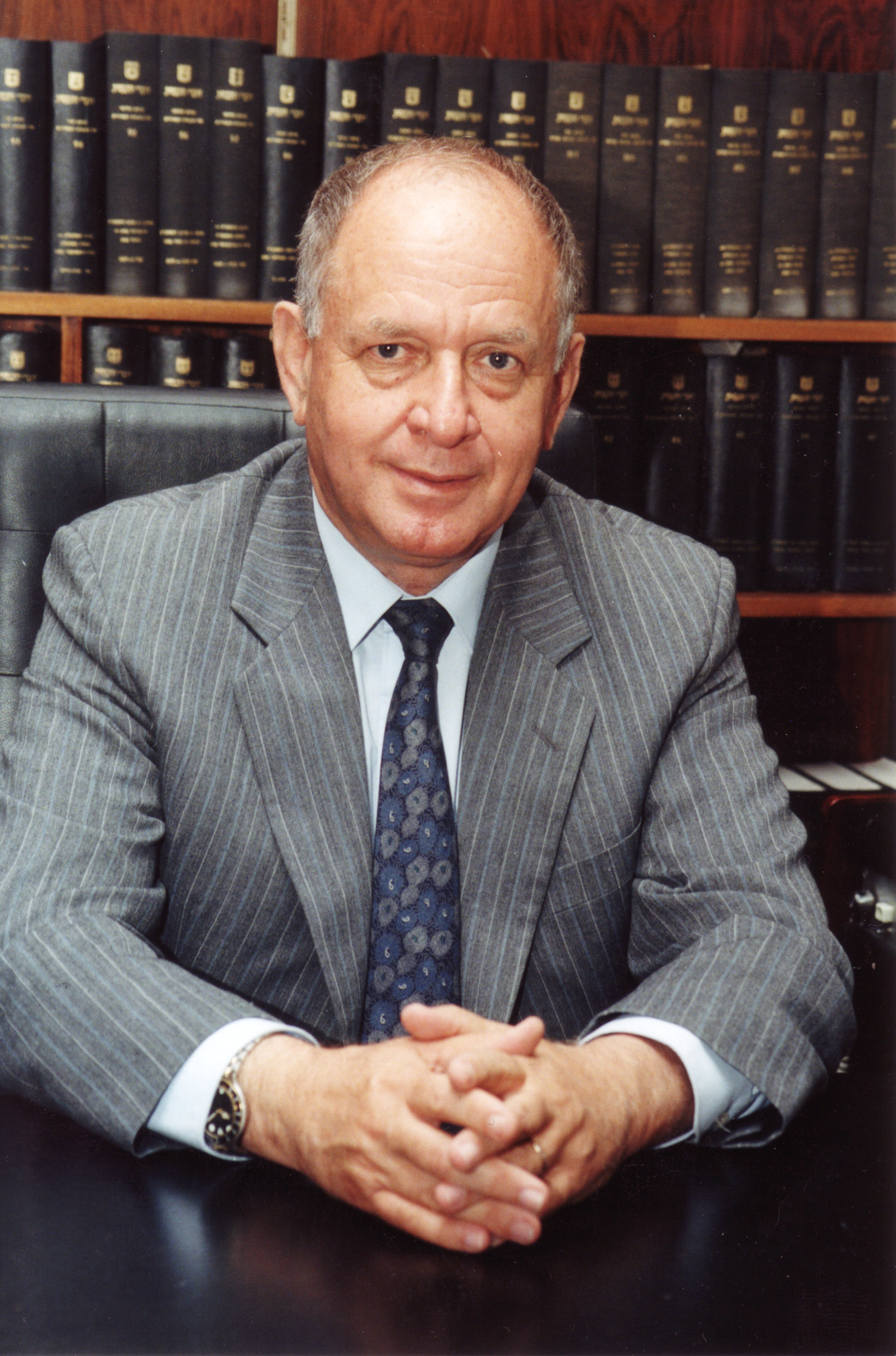
- Tichon in 1996

Speaker of the Knesset
- In office 24 June 1996 – 7 June 1999
- Preceded by: Shevah Weiss
- Succeeded by: Avraham Burg

Faction represented in the Knesset
- 1981–1999: Likud

Personal details
- Born: 5 January 1937 Kiryat Haim, Mandatory Palestine
- Died: 30 September 2024 (aged 87) Israel

Dan Tichon (Hebrew: דן תיכון; 5 January 1937 – 30 September 2024) was an Israeli politician.

== Biography ==
Tichon was born in Kiryat Haim during the Mandate era. He served as an officer in the Israel Defense Forces before graduating with an economics and international relations degree from the Hebrew University of Jerusalem. From 1970 to 1974, he served as Advisor to the Minister of Trade and Industry on Development Areas and from 1971 to 1981, he was Chairman of the Directors' Council of the Housing and Development Company. In 1977, he was appointed Director General of the Housing and Development Company. In the 2000s (decade), he served as the Chairman of the Israel Port Authority and later as the Chairman of the Israel Ports Development & Assets Company, but resigned in January 2006 over corruption issues.

== Political career ==
In 1981 he was elected to the 10th Knesset as a member of Likud. He served as member of the Knesset Committees on Finance, Internal Affairs and the Environment, State Control, Energy, and Sport. In 1984, Tichon was re-elected and became Deputy Speaker of the Knesset and member of the Knesset Committees on Finance and State Audit.

After being elected again to the 12th Knesset he continued in these positions, serving also as Chairman of the Israel-Germany Parliamentary Friendship League.

In the 13th Knesset he was Chairman of the Knesset Committee on State Audit, and member of the Knesset Committee on Finance. In July 1996, he was appointed Speaker of the 14th Knesset.

He lost his seat in the 1999 elections.

In 2010 and 2011 Tichon was chairman of the Task Force for International Cooperation on Holocaust Education, Remembrance, and Research.

== Personal life and death ==
Tichon was married and had two children. His grandson, Roy Schwartz Tichon is an activist promoting civil rights through "Noa Tanua", a nonprofit organization he founded.

Tichon died in Israel on 30 September 2024 at the age of 87.
