= Kokhav HaTzafon =

Residential neighborhood in northwestern Tel Aviv, Israel

Kokhav HaTzafon כוכב הצפון
- Neighborhood
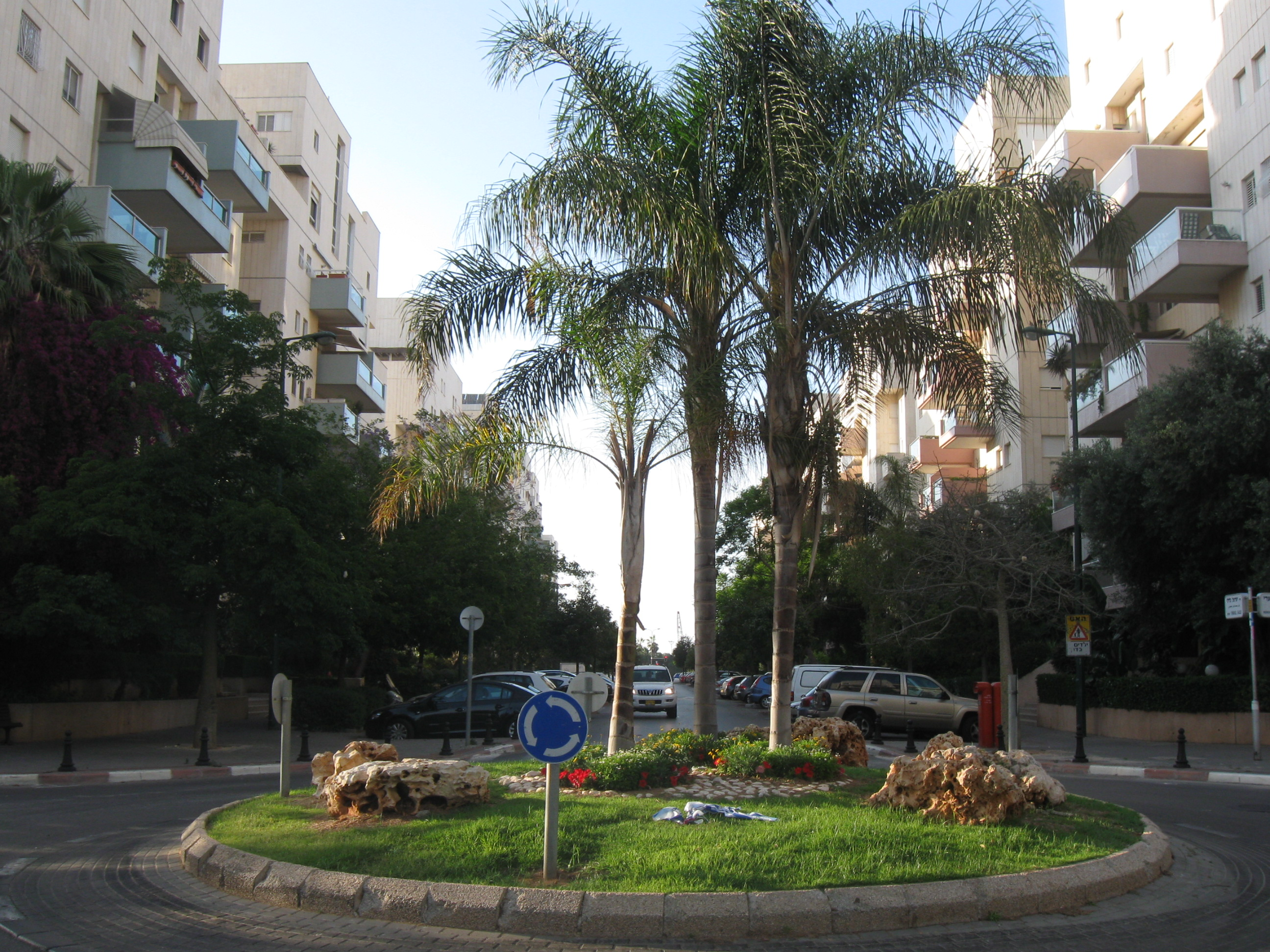
- Kokhav HaTzafon
- Interactive map of Kokhav HaTzafon
- Coordinates: 32°06′03″N 34°47′10″E

Population
  - Total: 4,160

Kokhav HaTzafon (Hebrew: שכונת כוכב הצפון, lit. Northern Star) is a residential neighborhood in northwestern Tel Aviv, Israel.

== History ==
Kokhav HaTzafon is a New North neighborhood that is the closest to the Old North area, Tel Aviv Port and adjacent to the Yarkon Park (100 meters). The neighborhood boundaries are Ibn Gabirol Street (West), Shay Agnon and Sde Dov Airport (North), Namir (East) and Yarkon Park (South).

The neighborhood extends over approximately 42.1 hectares, and its built-up area is approximately 24.4 hectares, with over 1,700 apartments. There are about 4,160 residents that live in the neighborhood (as of 2012). Northern Star was built during the 90s and has very few land reserves. The outer part of the neighborhood is characterized by high-rise construction in shared houses. Inside the neighborhood are a few cottage houses.

The neighborhood was ranked in 2015 by Madlan, an Israeli real estate site, as one of the most expensive neighborhoods due to its location – according to Yedioth Ahronoth, "The research revealed Northern Star neighborhood in North of Tel Aviv is the most expensive, with a price tag of 3.98 million for an average apartment"

== Landmarks ==
The neighborhood has a park with a playground and fountain. A dog park was opened in 2016 on Ibn Gabirol Street.

== Schools and educational institutions ==
- Kokhav HaTzafon Elementary school – In September 2015 the elementary school, "Northern Star", started to operate. The school has been designed as ecological and includes green features such as shell walls and windows thermal insulator. The school building covers 0.2 hectares of a total area of 0.85 hectares including indoor sports. In addition, at the school enrichment classes are offered for the neighborhood children.
- WIZO Day-care – WIZO day care center for toddlers in the neighborhood.
- Kindergarten – three municipal kindergartens in urban preschoolers are located on Abba Kovner Street

== Demography ==
According to the Israeli's Central Bureau of Statistics (CBS) and Madlan website, the Northern Star neighborhood scored the highest socio-economic index (ranked 10 out of 10).

The residents of the neighborhood are mostly academic that are engaged in "free" professions.

Among the neighborhood residents, there are few known Israeli figures, including Hanoch Rosen Ephraim Sidon, Zahi Grossman, Benny Carmeli, Ami Kobo, Eitan Erez Yuri Guy Ron Shimon Amsalem, Michael Oren and others.

=== Statistical data ===
- Party leads in elections: the Zionist camp, 44%
- Employment: white collar, 45%
- Persons per apartment: 2.2
- Age distribution (CBS, 2012):

Up to 17	18-65	65 and above
19%	65%	16%

- Distribution of education (CBS, 2012):

Academics	With maturity	Without maturity
50%	27%	23%

== Transportation ==
- Reading Terminal – public transport terminal center, within walking distance from the neighborhood. The terminal is located closest to the west side of the neighborhood. This terminal serves the island harbor of Northern Star residents, Yarkon Park visitors, Reading Power Station and Sde Dov base. In addition, on the eastern edge of the neighborhood lies Seminar Kibbutzim also within walking distance, it provides dozens of lines of public transportation and is used by local residents.
- Bike paths – neighborhood surrounded by bike paths – Levi Eshkol St.(east), Agnon St.(north), Ibn Gabirol St. (west). These routes allow easy access to the neighborhood bike, without the danger of going down to the road.
- Light Rail Transit the Green Line, expected to be the second LRT line in metropolitan Tel Aviv. The Green Line will pass through Ibn Gabirol Street which is located in the western edge of the Northern Star. This line will connect the southern parts of the metropolis (city of Holon and Rishon LeZion) as well as northern part (Herzliya) with Tel Aviv. Line length approximately 39 km, including 4.5 km underground with 61 stations, of which five underground stations (stations Lewinsky, Carlebach, Dizengoff, Rabin Square / City Hall and Arlosoroff).

== See also ==
- History of Tel Aviv
