= London Ministores Mall =

Shopping mall in Tel Aviv, Israel

Coordinates: 32°04′30.5″N 34°46′56.5″E

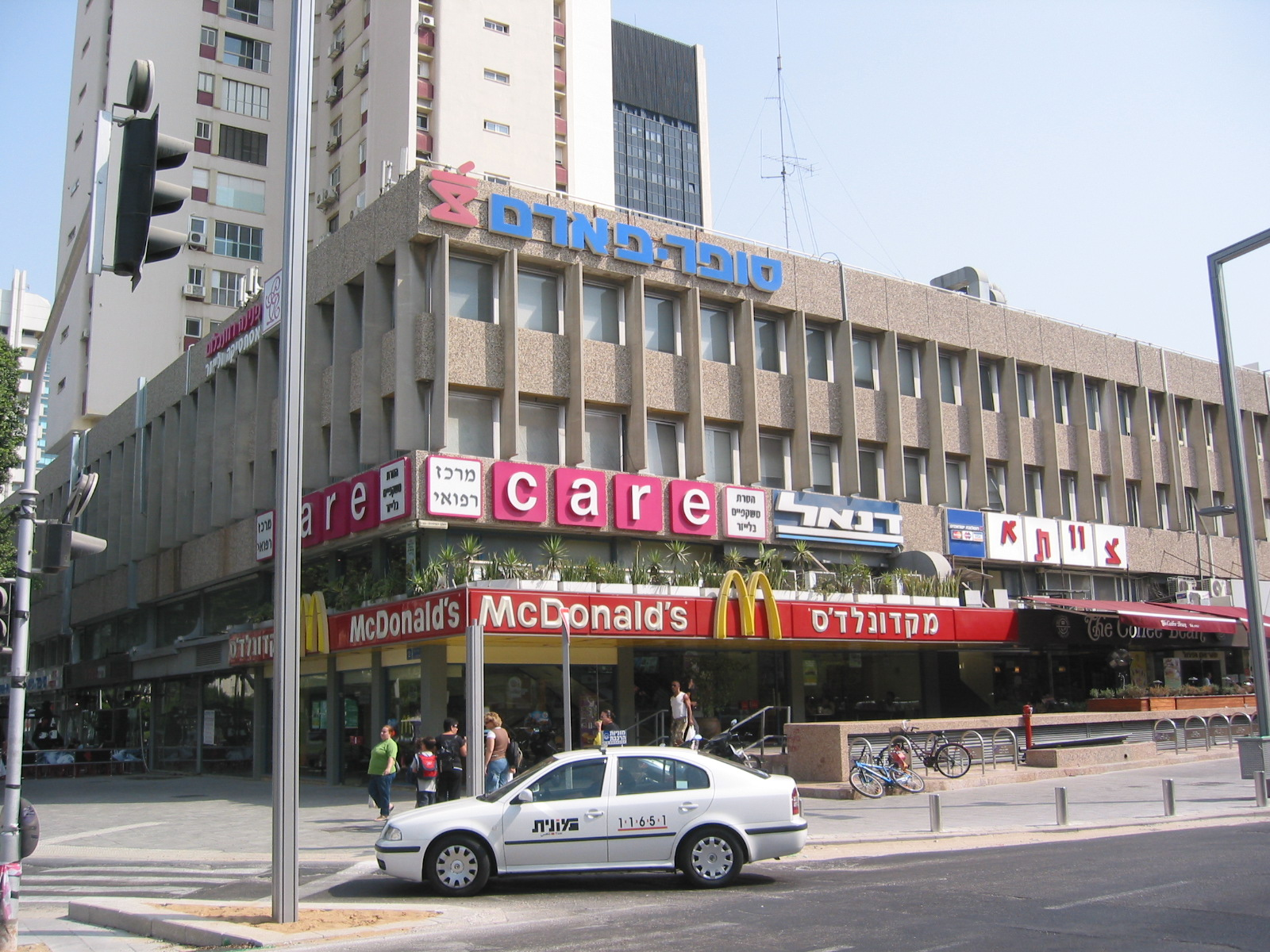
- Location: Tel Aviv, Israel
- Address: Corner of Sha'ul HaMelekh and Ibn Gabirol Streets
- Opened: 1972
- Architect: Binyamin Idelson, Ya'acov Herts, Gershon Tsipor, Baruh Meshulam (tower planning)

London Ministores (in the past London Ministore) is a commercial center located in the corner of the streets Sha'ul HaMelekh and Ibn Gabirol in Tel Aviv Center, Israel, in the first floor and the basement floor of "Ne'ot Aviv House".

The center was built in 1972 and was designed by the architects Binyamin Idelson, Ya'acov Herts and Gershon Tsipor. Because of ownership changes, the planning of the tower was done separately from the planning of the commercial area by the architect Baruh Meshulam. The center is a complex of mixed uses which includes institutions like Tsavta Club and Bat Dor Band, a commercial center which contains shops and restaurants, and above it two floors of offices. Above these floors there is a residence building of 15 floors which was one of the first residential towers in the country built as a "luxury building".

During the construction of the complex one of the construction workers was killed. On May 16, 1993, a fire broke out following a gas leak, and the building was repaired and reinhabited in 1994.

Some of the stores in the shopping center have access directly from the street, but most of them can be reached only by entering the doors of the commercial center.

This structure has caused a legal conflict between Tel Aviv municipality and the shop owners, about whether the public area inside the commercial area has a status of a street. At the court ruling of the district court in Tel Aviv the municipality's argument was rejected, and it was ruled that the public area is not a street since it is not an open place.
