= Ben-Ami Shulman =

Israeli architect

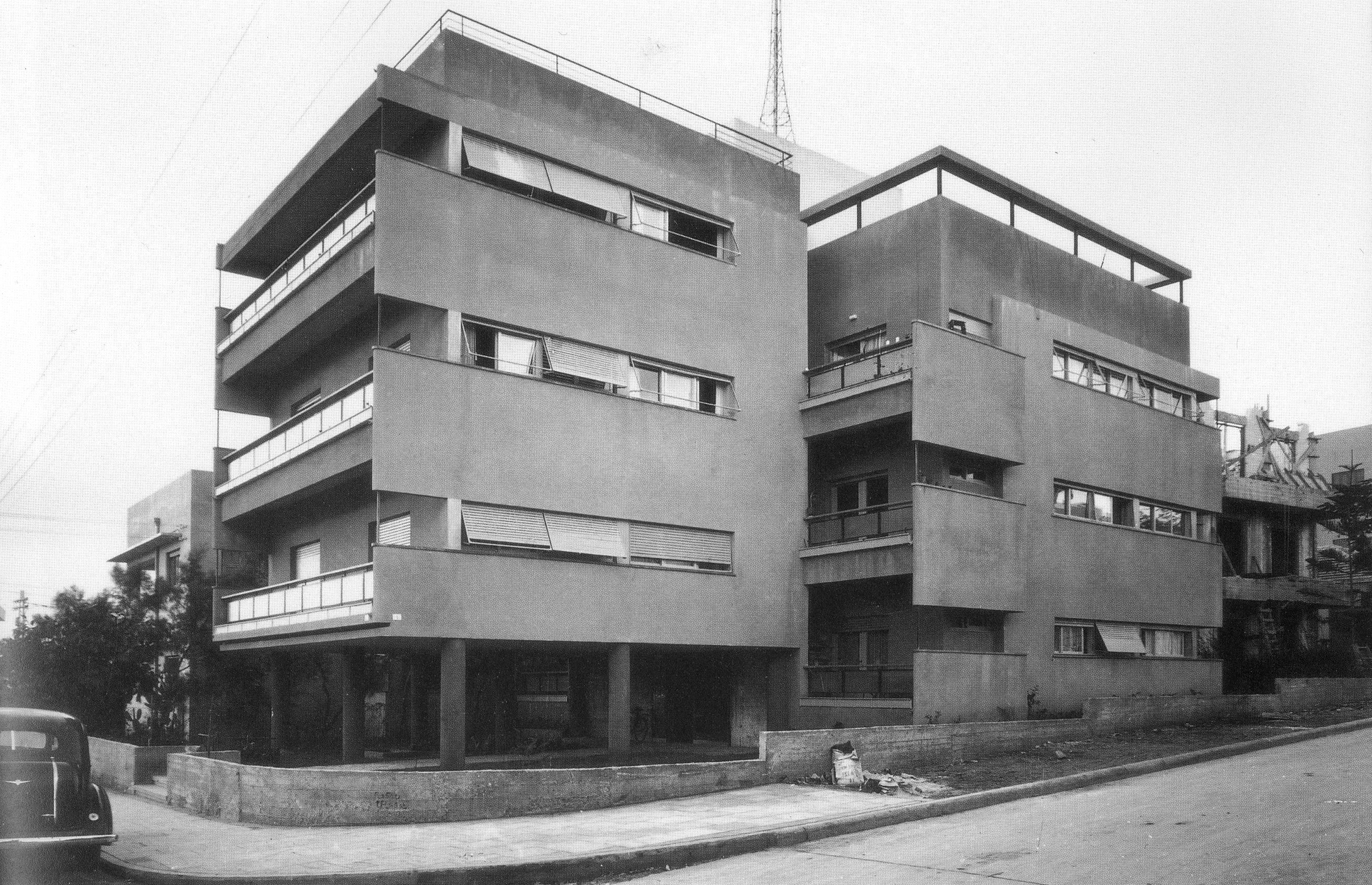
3 Mapu Street (1937)

Ben-Ami Shulman (Hebrew: בן-עמי שולמן; July 7, 1907, Jaffa, Ottoman Empire – May 1986, Los Angeles) was an Israeli architect who was posthumously recognized as one of the significant 1930s architects of the modernist White City of Tel Aviv. The White City, which features the largest collection of international style architecture in the world, was designated a UNESCO World Heritage Site in 2003.

This designation resulted from the efforts of both Israeli and German architectural historians, beginning in the 1980s, to document the history of the architecture. Preservation and restoration of these buildings, many of which were neglected due to the economy or insensitive additions, are underway, and eight of them have been designated as landmarks.

Along with other 1930's Israeli architects, Shulman's work was documented in book form in 1994 by German photographer Irmel Kamp-Bandeau and in 2004 by Israeli architect, historian and preservationist Nitza Metzger-Szmuk. Shulman and his work are included in the international traveling exhibition based on her book Dwelling On The Dunes: Tel Aviv Modern Movement and Bauhaus Ideals.

Positive/negative elements, such as rounded volumes or recessed prisms in the essentially flat facades were a specialty of Ben-Ami Shulman who designed buildings with a freedom reminiscent of plasticine modeling.

== Life and career ==
Shulman was among several Israeli architects of his time, including Genia Averbuch and Dov Karmi, who studied architecture in Brussels, Belgium and whose work, according to Nitza Metzger-Szmuk, demonstrates an unusual range of creativity when compared to architects trained at the Bauhaus or other schools. He studied under Victor Horta at the Academie Royale des Beaux-Arts, graduating in 1931 with a degree with honors in architecture and engineering. Horta's influence on Shulman has been identified by the extensive use of paneled glass walls on the facade of his 1938 Gruzenberg (Rosenberg) Street commercial building which was unusual in Tel Aviv at that time.

Shulman designed the Zeire Zion pavilion for the Jewish National Fund exhibition in Brussels before returning to Tel Aviv, where he practiced residential and commercial architecture from 1931 to 1947. Shulman's innovative design for an apartment building at 3 Mapu Street in 1937 became the focus of an unusual coalition of prominent architects of the time who supported his efforts to fight the city's municipal building department, who had rejected the plan for the building. Shulman's skillful creation of a "cubist and precise" sense of monumentality for a modest building was noted by architect/planner Nahoum Cohen in Bauhaus Tel Aviv: An Architectural Guide. Although it had deteriorated over the years, it was restored in 2012 by architect and conservationist Mimar Naor, and commemorated with a plaque highlighting its originality. Views of the restoration are included in a new book Preservation and Renewal- Bauhaus and International Style Buildings in Tel Aviv published by Bauhaus Center Tel Aviv.

The political and economic difficulties of 1947 led Shulman and other architects to emigrate in search of work. Shulman moved to Montreal, Quebec, Canada, where he practiced residential and commercial architecture until 1960, when he moved to Los Angeles. There, he set up a practice with his son, architect Uzi Shulman, also a graduate of the Academie Royale des Beaux-Arts. Ben-Ami Shulman adapted his modernism to the diversity of Southern California mid-century styles of architecture.

Shulman visited Israel frequently after his emigration, but did not try to promote his 1930's Tel Aviv architecture. He died in 1986. A few years later his son Uzi was contacted by architectural historians about his father's Tel Aviv work.

Shulman's Tel Aviv period and his Los Angeles work were the subject of a 2015 exhibition, Some Shulman Architecture, at the American Institute of Architects Los Angeles chapter.

== Landmarks ==
Eight of Shulman's buildings in Tel Aviv have been designated as landmarks:

- 1933 57 Nachalat-Binyamin
- 1934 8 Dov Hoz Street
- 1934 34 Nachmani Street
- 1935 106 Dizengoff Street/41 Frishman Street
- 1935 147 Yirmiyahu Street
- 1935 21 Nachalat-Binyamin Street
- 1935 31 Rosenberg Street
- 1937 3 Mapu Street
