= Bauhaus (disambiguation) =

The Bauhaus, formal name Staatliches Bauhaus, was a German school of design which existed from 1919 to 1933.

Bauhaus may also refer to:

- Bauhaus (band), English gothic rock band
- Bauhaus (company), international company operating retail stores
- Bauhaus (magazine), German arts magazine (1926–1931)
- Bauhaus (typeface), font inspired by Herbert Bayer's experimental Universal typeface
- Bauhaus University, Weimar, university located in Weimar, Germany
- Bauhaus and its Sites in Weimar, Dessau and Bernau, World Heritage Site in Germany
- 8502 Bauhaus, Main-belt Asteroid discovered on 14 October 1990
- Phil Bauhaus (born 1994), German cyclist

== See also ==
- Bauhaus Museum (disambiguation), multiple museums
- Bauhaus Strong Coffee
- BaoHaus, a restaurant
