= Lotte Cohn =

German Israeli architect

- לוטה כהן
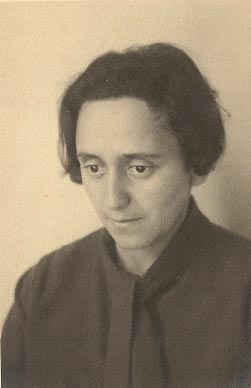
- Cohn in 1924
- Born: Recha Charlotte Cohn; August 20, 1898; Charlottenburg, Berlin, German Empire
- Died: April 7, 1983 (aged 84); Tel Aviv, Israel

Lotte Cohn (Hebrew: לוטה כהן; 1893-1983) was a German Israeli architect and pioneer in the development of Israeli architecture. She played a key role in disseminating early Modernist ideas in Israel and was a pioneer of Brutalist architecture.

== Personal life ==
Recha Charlotte Cohn was born on August 20, 1893, in Charlottenburg, Berlin to Bernhard Cohn, a Jewish medical doctor, and Cäcilie Cohn. She was the youngest of seven children. Her brother, Emil Cohn, was a well-known writer and playwright, who published under the pseudonym, Emil Bernhard. Her eldest sister, Helene Cohn, founded the League of Jewish Women for Gymnastics and Sport in 1910, and performed gymnastics at the Eleventh Zionist Congress in Vienna, Austria, in 1913.

In 1912 Cohn matriculated at the Technische Hochschule in Berlin (today Technische Universität Berlin); she graduated from the university's faculty of architecture in 1916, as one of the first women to do so. Between March 1917 and April 1919, Lotte worked in the reconstruction offices of Pillkallen, Tilsit and Gumbinnen in East Prussia. After returning to Berlin, she was employed as an assistant in the office of Zionist architect, Richard Michel.

After accepting the job of first assistant to the architect and city planner, Richard Kauffmann in 1921, Cohn moved to Jerusalem, Mandatory Palestine, with her sisters, Helene and Rosa. Her brother, Max, followed two years later with his family, and her mother emigrated to Mandatory Palestine in 1932.

Lotte Cohn died in Tel Aviv on April 7, 1983.

== Career ==
After graduating in 1916, Cohn worked in the reconstruction offices of Pillkallen, Tilsit and Gumbinnen in East Prussia from March 1917 until April 1919. After returning to Berlin, she was employed as an assistant in the office of Zionist architect, Richard Michel.

In Jerusalem, she worked in the office of architect Richard Kauffmann. Much of Cohn's work during this period focused on the development of a distinct Israeli architectural style. During her time in Kaufmann's office, she collaborated with him on the development plan for Jerusalem's garden suburbs as well as the development of several kibbutzim and moshavim on Mt Carmel in Haifa and the proposal for an industrial garden city close to Afula. Her individual projects include the design of the Jewish doctor, Theodor Zlocisti's, house and private clinic in Tel Aviv, the agricultural girls' school in Moshav Nahalal and the first children's house in Israel at Kibbutz Heftziba.

In 1923, Cohn was one of the founding members of the Association of Architects in Palestine, which would later become the Association of Engineers and Architects in Israel. In 1934, she was one of the founding members of the Architect's circle, which was meant to continue the work of the Berlin-based Architect's circle that had been dissolved in 1933 and had counted Walter Gropius, the Taut Brothers, Erich Mendelsohn and Mies van der Rohe as members.

In 1927, due to the worsening economic situation in Mandatory Palestine, the city's urban development office was closed and Cohn found a position with the Chief Architect of the Public Works Department of Mandatory Palestine, Austen St. Barbe Harrison.

From 1929-1930, she returned to Germany and worked for the well-known Berlin architect, Arthur Korn, who was active in the modernist architectural movement in Berlin and associated with Bauhaus architects, such as Walter Gropius and Ernst May.

After her return to Palestine at the end of 1930, Cohn opened her own architect's office in Tel Aviv. Her first project was for her friend, Käte Dan, designing a hotel at 97 HaYarkon Street, which would become an institution for German-speaking emigrants to Palestine and gave her friend the reputation as the founder of the hotel sector in Israel. Afterwards, she constructed a house for Gershom Scholem and Hugo Bergmann at 51 Ramban Street, and a house at 28 Abarbanel Street, where Scholem and his wife, Fania, lived until his death.

Due to the influx of Jewish refugees from Europe, many of her designs were for housing. She introduced modernist ideas to Israel, adapting them to local conditions, with the style becoming particularly prominent in the White City of Tel Aviv. Many of her designs incorporated features (i.e. recessed windows and projecting panels) that would later be recognized as Brutalist.

In 1929, Cohn left Kauffmann's office, founding her own firm, where she remained until her retirement in 1968.

== Accomplishments and works ==
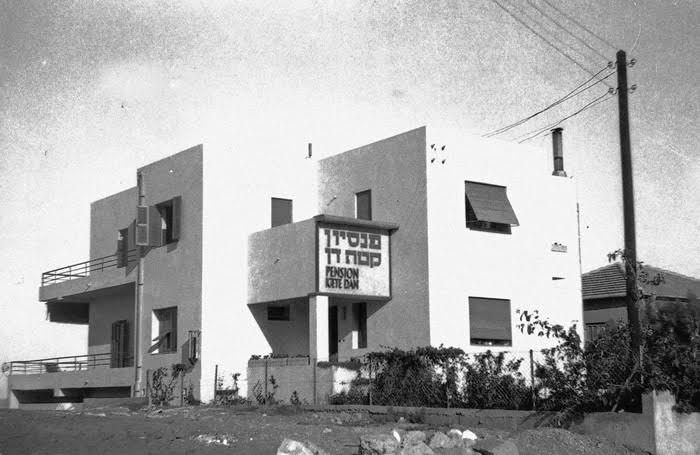
The Kaete Dan Hotel (1932) in Tel Aviv was Cohn's first major project

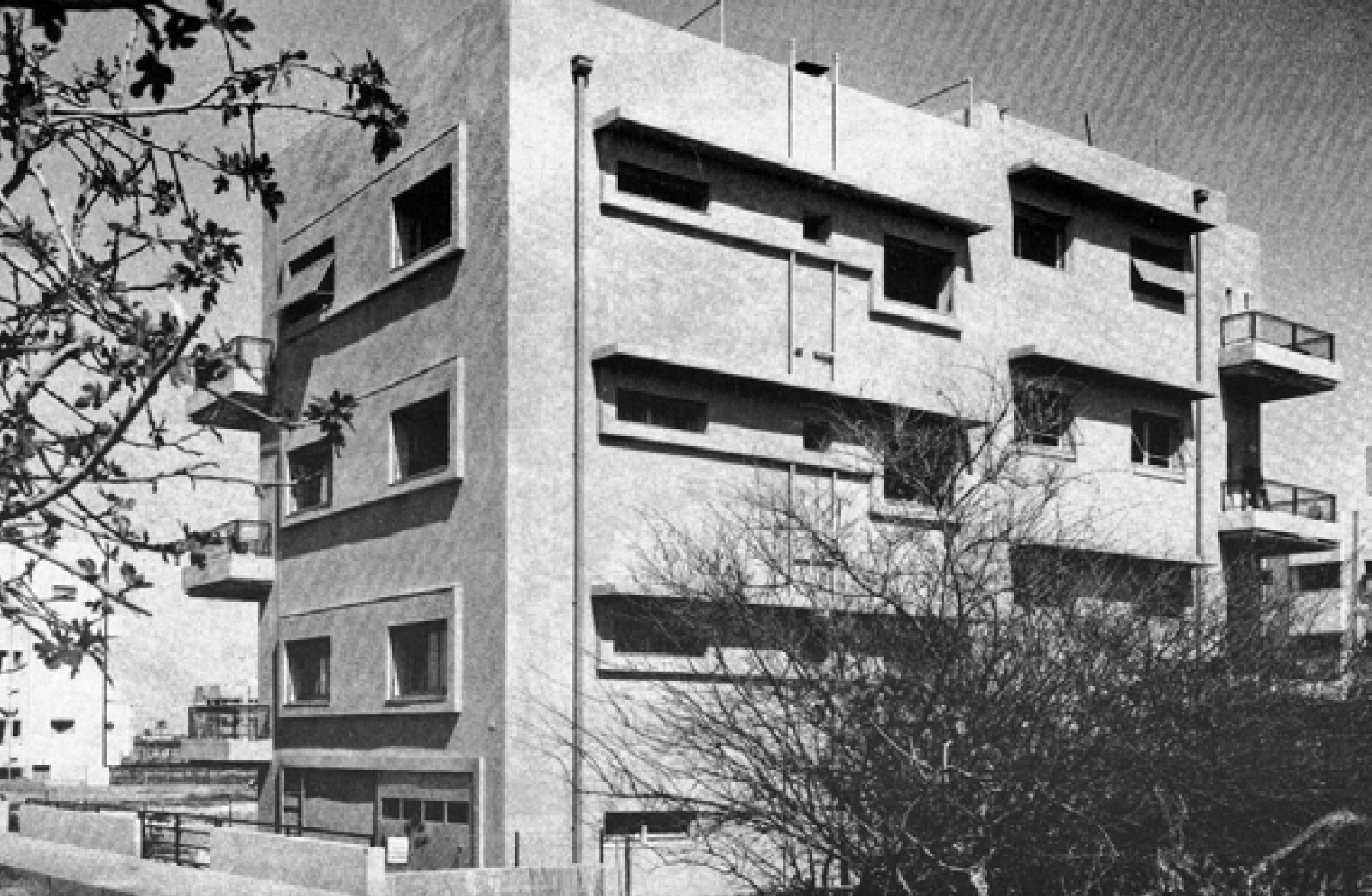
Residential building in Tel Aviv (1936)
