= Bauhaus Museum =

Bauhaus Museum may refer to:

- Bauhaus Museum Weimar, Germany
- Bauhaus Museum Dessau, Germany
- Bauhaus Archive, Berlin, Germany
- Bauhaus Foundation Tel Aviv, Israel
- Bauhaus Center Tel Aviv, Israel
