= Max Liebling House =

Bauhaus-style modernist building in Tel Aviv, Israel

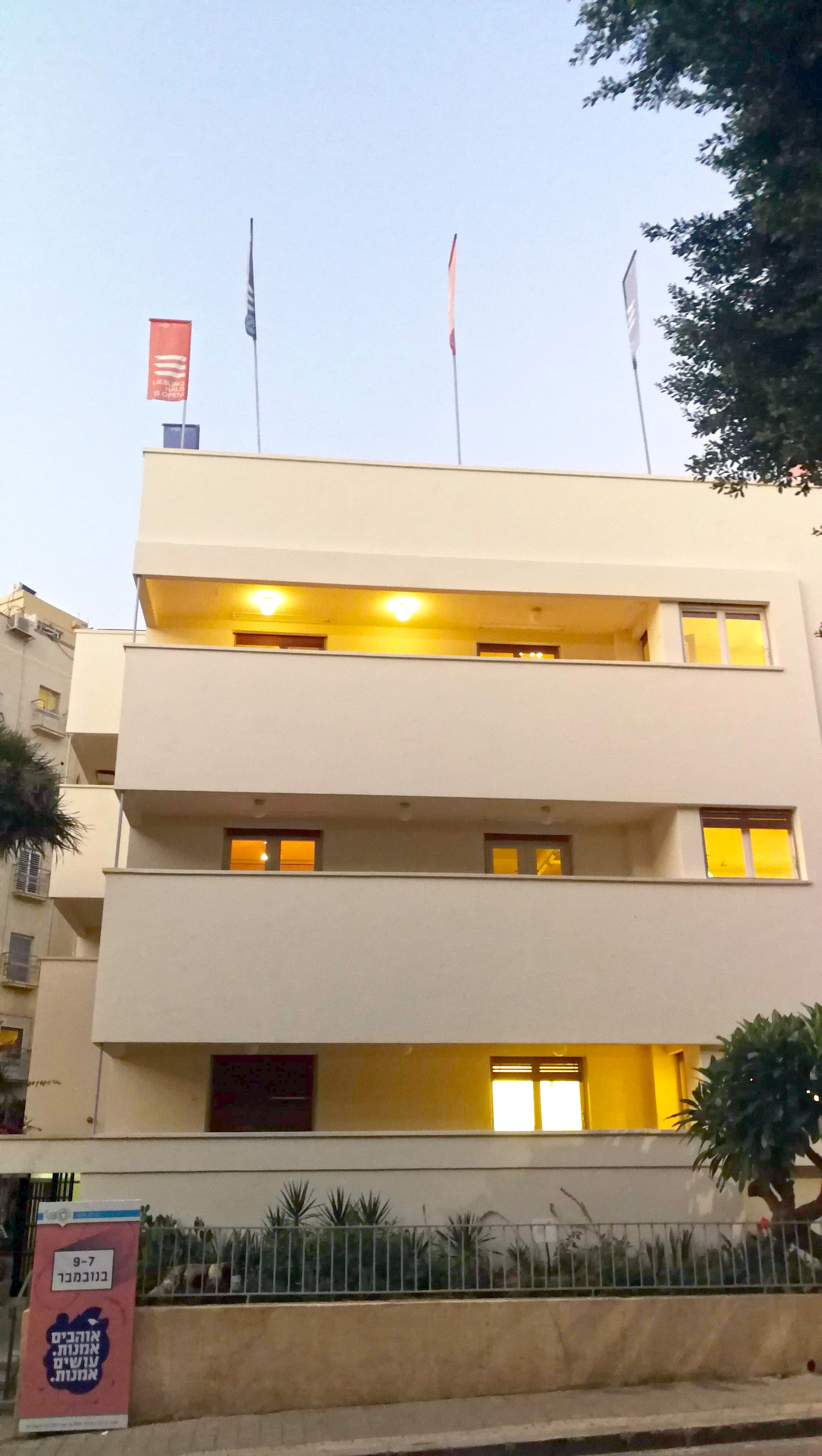
- Interactive map of the Max Liebling House area

General information
- Architectural style: Bauhaus, International Style
- Location: 29 Idelson Street, Tel Aviv, Israel
- Coordinates: 32.0734°N 34.7704°E
- Construction started: 1936
- Owner: Tel Aviv-Yafo Municipality

Design and construction
- Architect: Dov Karmi

Website
- www.lieblinghaus.org

Max Liebling House is a Bauhaus-style modernist building in Tel Aviv, Israel. Located at 29 Idelson Street, it was designed by architect Dov Karmi and engineer Zvi Barak, and built by Tony and Max Liebling in 1936. In the 1970s Tony Liebling donated it to the city, and since September 2019 it houses Liebling Haus - The White City Center, a cultural institution supported by Tel Aviv and Germany and focusing on research and education in the fields of architectural and urban conservation, based on the principles of Bauhaus and International Style.

== History ==
Max Leibling house was the first building in the country to use elongated recessed balconies, an adaptation of Le Corbusier's strip windows. Horizontality is emphasized by the narrow intervals between the building's parapet and overhang; not only does this have the design impact of emphasizing the horizontal style, it has the practical effect of screening out the heat of the Mediterranean sun. The timbered pergola, a design element frequently seen in Jerusalem, is unusual in Tel Aviv.

In 2014 Max Liebling House was one of the first ten modernist buildings to receive restoration grants under the Getty Foundation's new "Keeping It Modern" initiative.

In 2015 the German government funded the restoration of the House as a museum that would also oversee the restoration and preservation of Tel Aviv's notable Bauhaus buildings. Tel Aviv's White City district, a designate World Heritage Site, is the largest collection of German Bauhaus-style buildings found anywhere in the world.

== Design ==
The house features distinctive characteristics of the International Style, such as a designed entrance that also includes a fishpond, a luxurious stairwell, and recessed balconies.

The house stands out as the first building in Israel to use elongated recessed balconies as an adaptation to the ribbon windows (continuous horizontal windows serving as a motif in the building envelope, allowing any desired opening for light, air, and a sense of flow into the building) of Le Corbusier. The horizontal lines are emphasized by the narrow spaces between the building's shell and the pergola; the building incorporates design influences that highlight the horizontal style, as well as a practical effect of shading from the Mediterranean midday sun. The wooden-covered pergola, an architectural element often seen in Jerusalem, is rarer in Tel Aviv.

During the renovation, efforts were made to preserve the unique style of the building. According to architect Rivka Karmi, responsible for the renovation, the uniqueness of the building also arises from the proportions of the front and its connection to the street. The balconies and narrow windows serve as mediation between the outside and inside, isolating from noise and light.

The research conducted prior to the renovation, as well as its planning and execution, mostly using traditional materials and techniques, were carried out in collaboration with experts from Germany who prioritized the building's needs over other considerations. In some walls, previous paint layers were preserved, and some were repainted in the original colors of Le Corbusier. The windows, frames, and doors were restored to details, including adjustable blinds in the doors. In the front restoration, the original plaster was preserved as much as possible, and cracks were fixed using a special technique rather than replacing the entire plaster.

== See also ==
- Bauhaus Center, Tel Aviv
- Bauhaus Museum, Tel Aviv
- Architecture of Israel
