= Phillips (auctioneers) =

British auction house

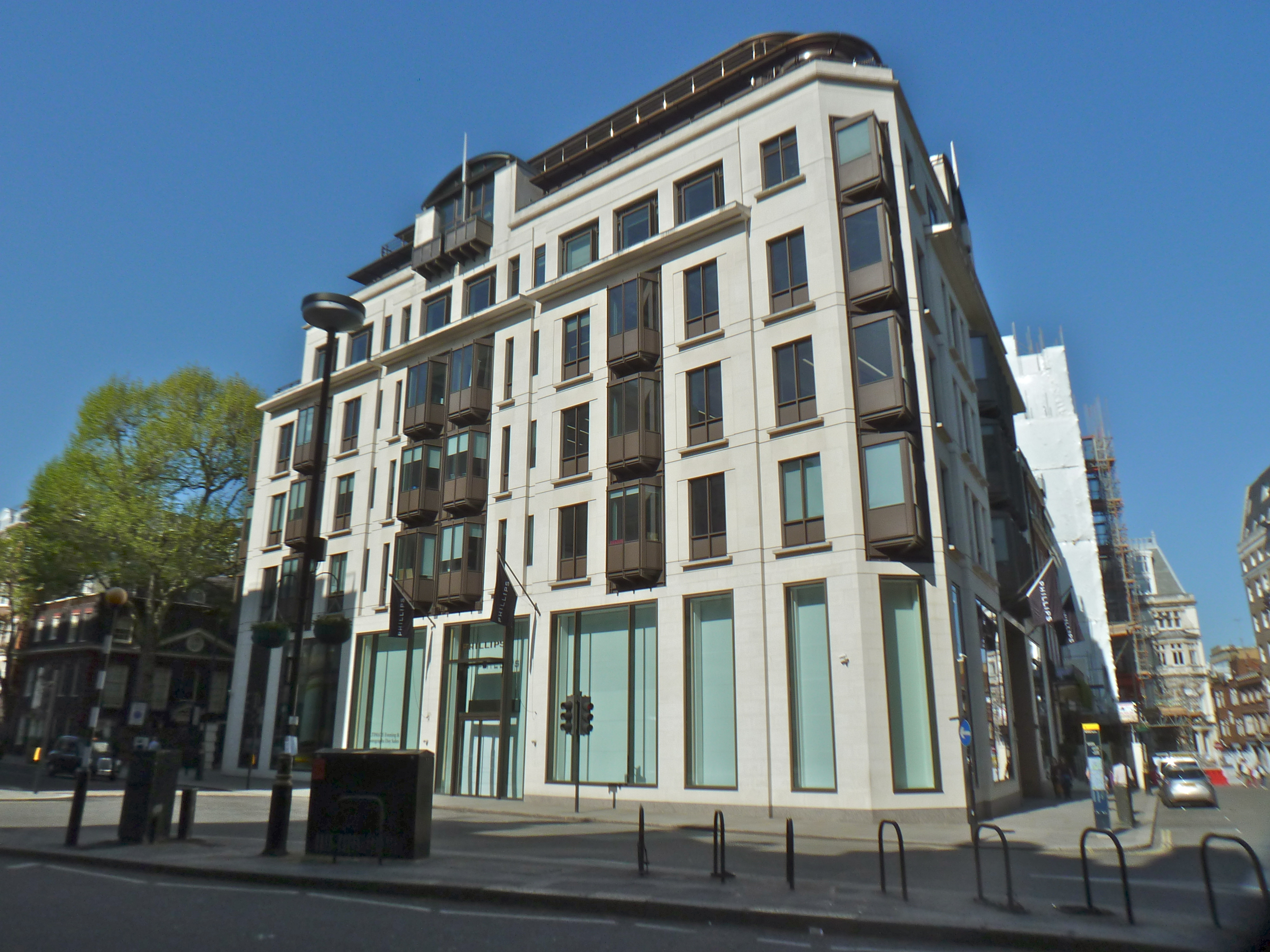
- Phillips' headquarters in London
- Type: Private
- Industry: auctioneering
- Founded: 1796; 230 years ago
- Founder: Harry Phillips
- Headquarters: London, United Kingdom
- Key people: Martin Wilson (CEO); Bernd Runge (COO)
- Parent: Mercury Group
- Website: phillips.com

Phillips, formerly known as Phillips the Auctioneers and briefly as Phillips de Pury, is a British auction house. It was founded in London in 1796, and has head offices in London and in New York City. In 2022 it was owned by the Mercury Group, a Russian luxury goods company.

== History ==
Phillips was founded in 1796 by Harry Phillips, who had been a clerk to James Christie. The business held twelve auctions in its first year and soon became successful. Napoleon and Beau Brummell were among the early patrons. Harry Phillips died in 1840, and the business passed to his son William Augustus, who renamed it Phillips & Son; when his son-in-law Frederick Neale joined in 1882, the company became Phillips, Son & Neale. It was renamed Phillips in the 1970s; it was usually referred to as Phillips, the Auctioneers. In 1998, the company bought Selkirk, then a 168-year-old St. Louis auction house.

In 1999 a majority stake in the company was sold to venture capitalists 3i, who resold it shortly after for a considerable profit. The company was bought in 1999 by Bernard Arnault of LVMH Moët Hennessy – Louis Vuitton. After a series of disastrous sales and extremely heavy losses, the UK operations were sold to Bonhams in 2001 and merged into that company. Most of the rump of the business was closed; some smaller departments were acquired by Simon de Pury and Daniella Luxembourg, who traded under the name Phillips de Pury & Company. In 2002 Simon de Pury acquired majority control of the firm.

On 6 October 2008, the company was purchased by the Russian Mercury Group, which paid approximately $60 million for it. De Pury sold his remaining shares to Mercury in late 2012, and left the company. The name was changed back to Phillips.

In December 2018 the company signed a contract for retail space at 432 Park Avenue including the Park Avenue Cube beside the tower, with approximately 5000 m^{2} (55000 ft^{2}) at the base of the tower and a further 3000 m^{2} (30000 ft^{2}) underground.

== See also ==
- List of oldest fine art auction houses
