= White City, Tel Aviv =

White City of Tel-Aviv
UNESCO World Heritage Site
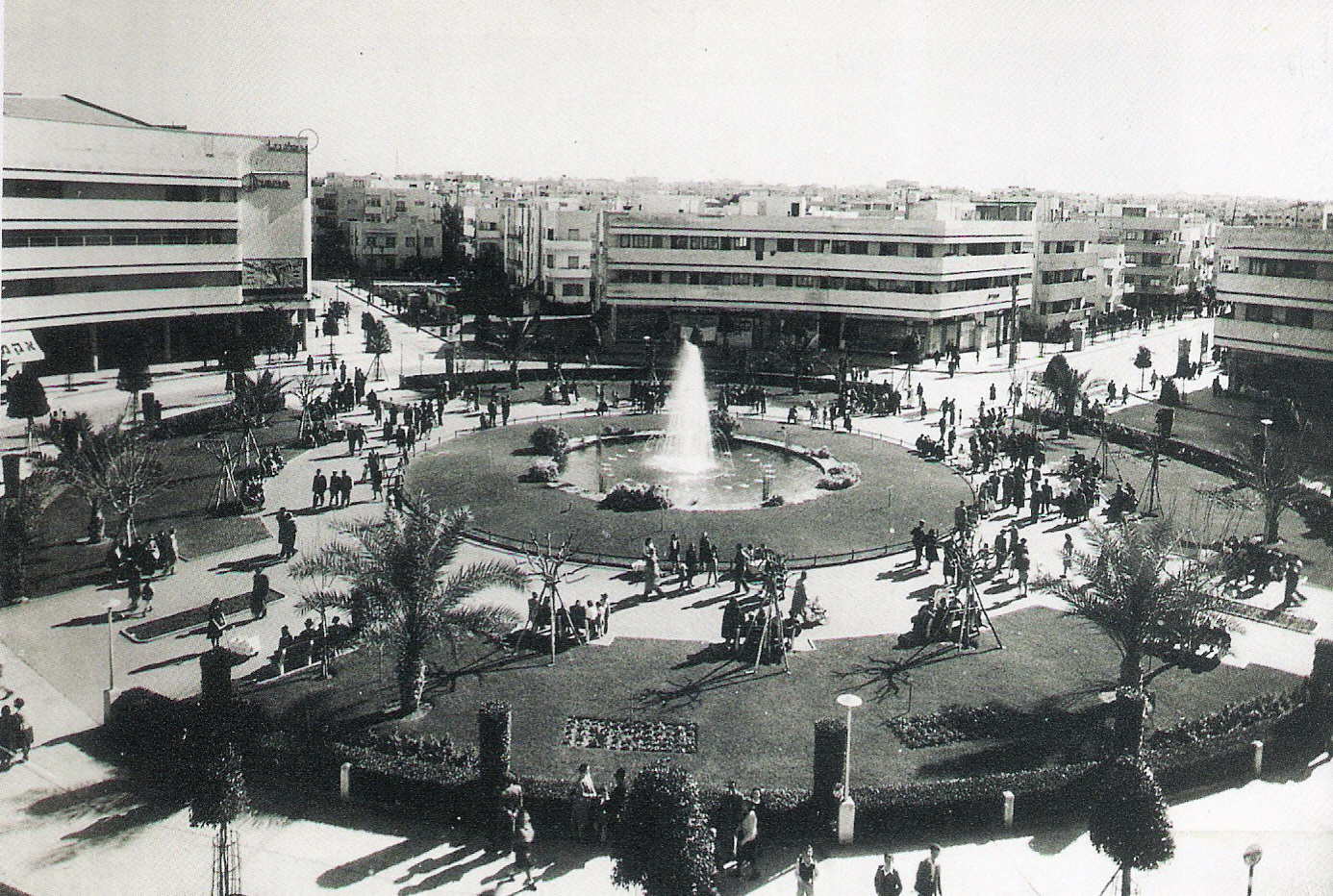
- Dizengoff Square in the 1940s

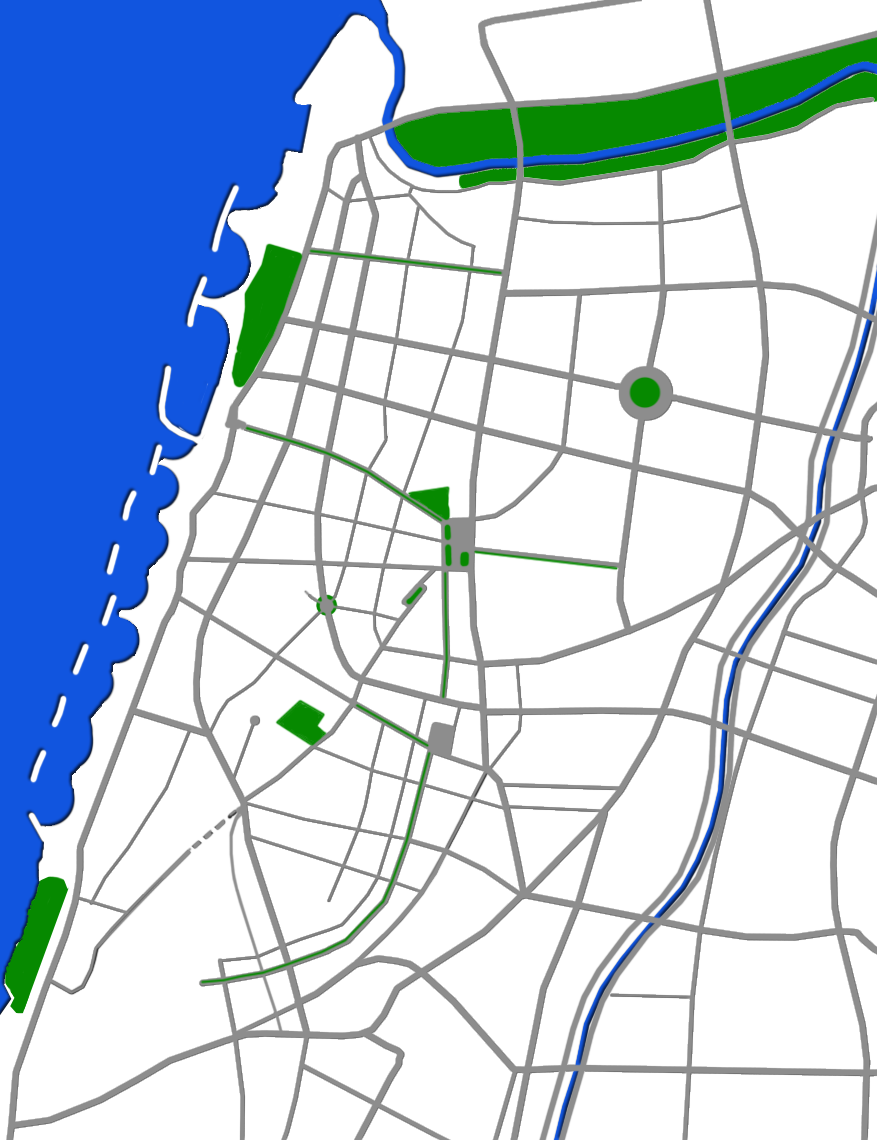
- Location within Tel Aviv Location within Israel
- Official name: White City of Tel-Aviv – the Modern Movement
- Location: Tel Aviv, Israel
- Criteria: Cultural: (ii), (iv)
- Reference: 1096
- Inscription: 2003 (27th Session)
- Area: 140.4 ha (347 acres)
- Buffer zone: 197 ha (490 acres)
- Coordinates: 32°04′N 34°47′E

The White City (Hebrew: העיר הלבנה, Ha-Ir ha-Levana; Arabic: المدينة البيضاء Al-Madinah al-Bayḍā’) is a collection of over 4,000 buildings in Tel Aviv from the 1930s built in a unique form of the International Style, commonly known as Bauhaus, by German Jewish architects who fled to the British Mandate of Palestine from Germany (and other Central and Eastern European countries with German cultural influences) after the rise to power of the Nazis. Tel Aviv has the largest number of buildings in the Bauhaus/International Style of any city in the world. Preservation, documentation, and exhibitions have brought attention to Tel Aviv's collection of 1930s architecture. In 2003, the United Nations Educational, Scientific and Cultural Organization (UNESCO) proclaimed Tel Aviv's White City a World Cultural Heritage site, as "an outstanding example of new town planning and architecture in the early 20th century." The citation recognized the unique adaptation of modern international architectural trends to the cultural, climatic, and local traditions of the city. Bauhaus Center Tel Aviv organizes regular architectural tours of the city.

== History ==
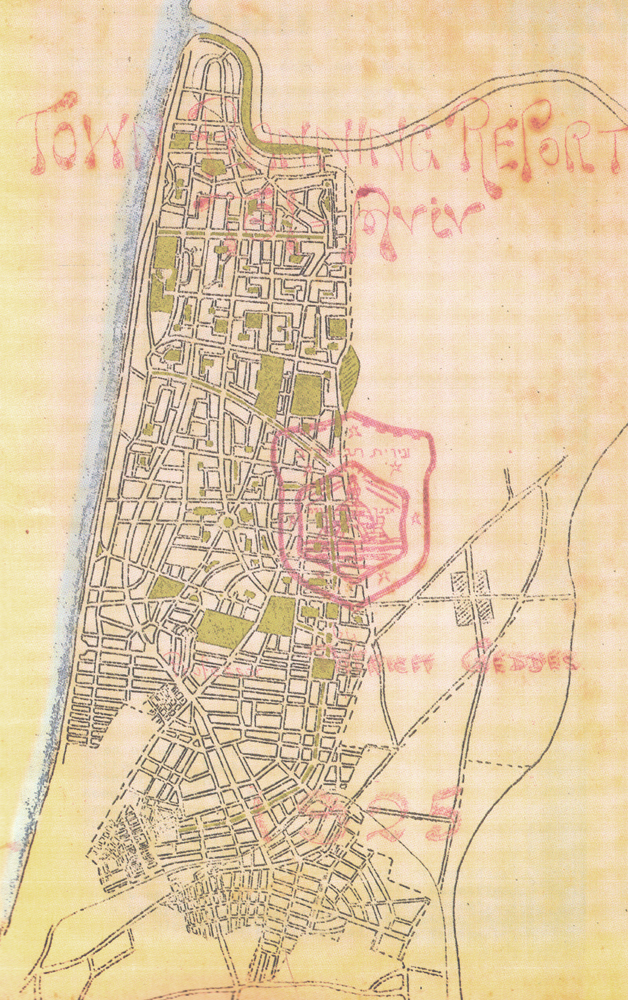
Geddes Plan for Tel Aviv

The concept for a new garden city, to be called Tel Aviv, was developed on the sand dunes outside Jaffa in 1909. Scottish urban planner Patrick Geddes, who had previously worked on town-planning in New Delhi, was commissioned by Tel Aviv's first mayor, Meir Dizengoff, to draw up a master plan for the new city. Geddes began work in 1925 on the plan, which was accepted in 1929. The view of the British Mandatory authorities seemed to have been supportive. In addition to Geddes, and Dizengoff, the city engineer Ya'acov Ben-Sira contributed significantly to the development and planning during his 1929 to 1951 tenure.

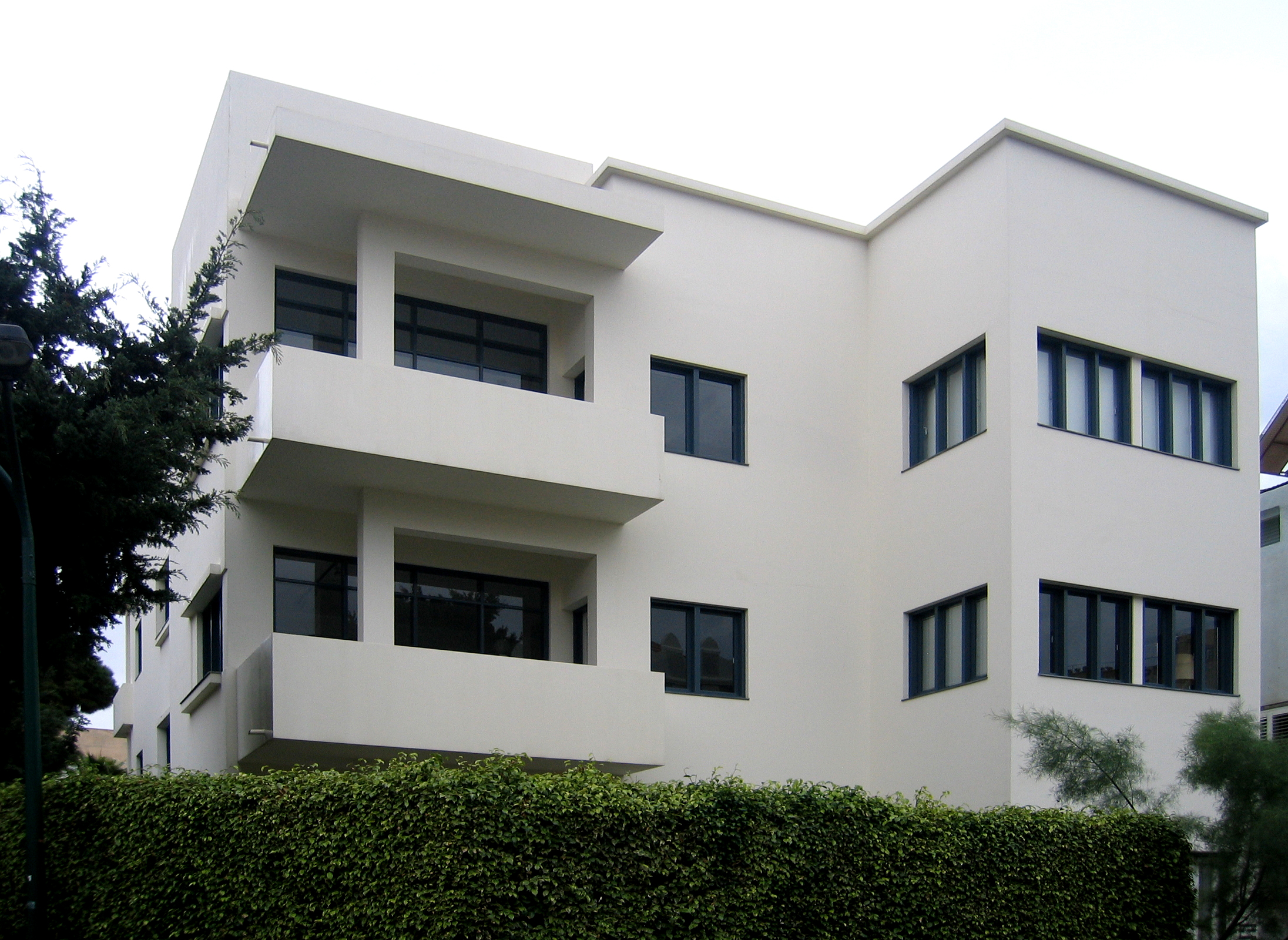
Bauhaus Foundation, Tel Aviv

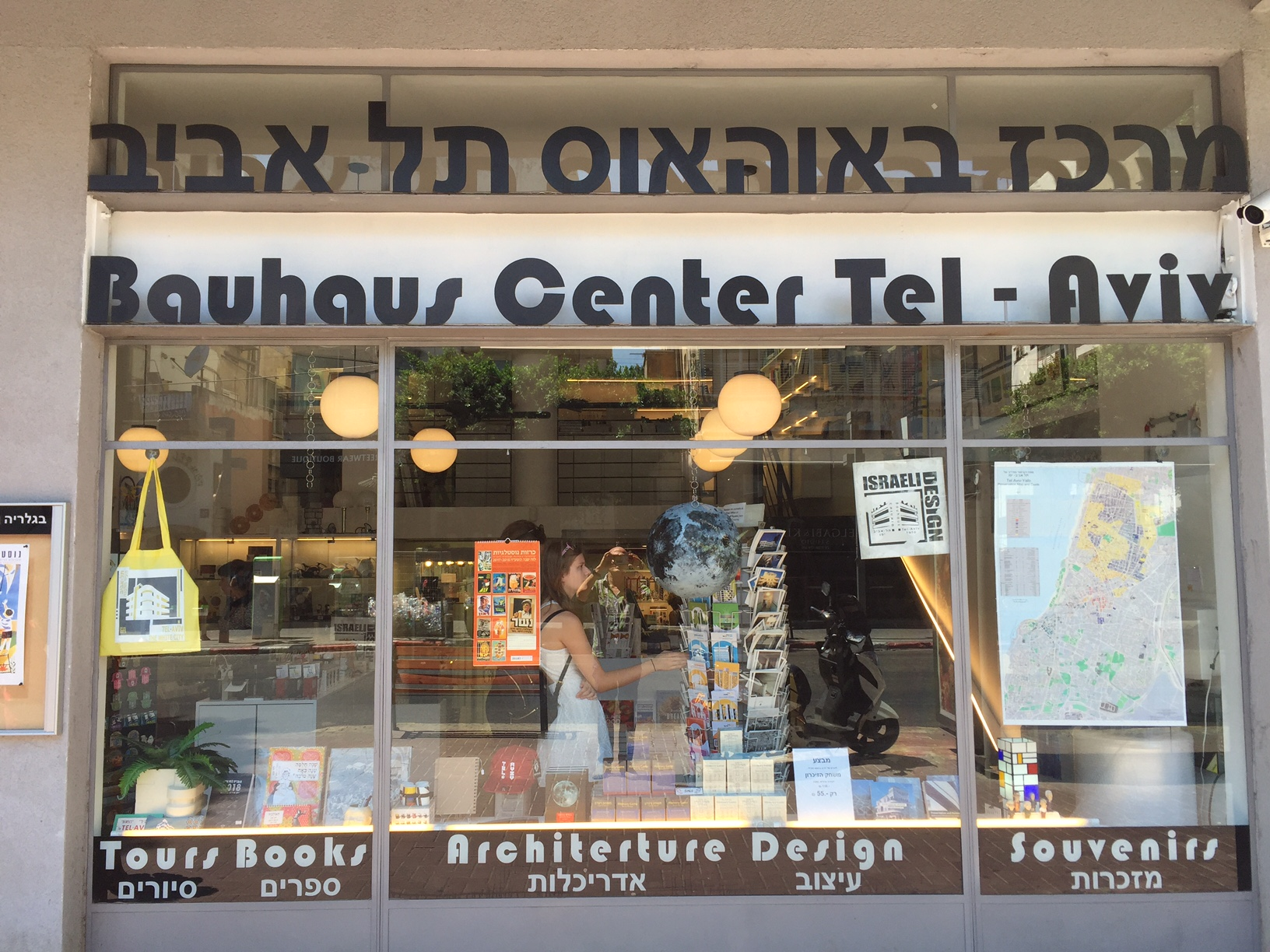
Bauhaus Center Tel Aviv

Patrick Geddes laid out the streets and decided on block size and utilisation. Geddes did not prescribe an architectural style for the buildings in the new city. But by 1933, many Jewish architects of the Bauhaus school in Germany, like Arieh Sharon, had fled to the British Mandate of Palestine. Both the emigration of these Jewish architects and the closing of the Bauhaus school in Berlin were consequences of the rise to power of the Nazi party in Germany in 1933.

The residential and public buildings were designed by these architects, and by architects born locally including Ben-Ami Shulman, who put the principles of modern architecture into practice. The Bauhaus principles, with their emphasis on functionality and inexpensive building materials, were perceived as ideal in Tel Aviv. The architects fleeing Europe brought not only Bauhaus ideas; the architectural ideas of Le Corbusier were also mixed in. Furthermore, Erich Mendelsohn was not formally associated with the Bauhaus, though he had several projects in Israel in the 1930s as did Carl Rubin, an architect from Mendelsohn's office. In the 1930s in Tel Aviv, many architectural ideas were converging and Tel Aviv was the ideal place for them to be tested.

Location map of the three conservation zones included in the WHS listing

In 1984, in celebration of Tel Aviv's 75th year, an exhibition was held at the Tel Aviv Museum of Art entitled White City, International Style Architecture in Israel, Portrait of an Era. Some sources trace the origin of the term "White City" to this exhibition and its curator Michael Levin, some to the poet Nathan Alterman. The 1984 exhibition traveled to New York, to the Jewish Museum. In 1994, a conference took place at the UNESCO headquarters, entitled World Conference on the International Style in Architecture. Credit was given to Israeli artist Dani Karavan who made a sculpture garden at the headquarters, and had earlier made a sculptural environment entitled Kikar Levana that was inspired by the White City. In 1996, Tel Aviv's White City was listed as a World Monuments Fund endangered site. In 2003, UNESCO named Tel Aviv a World Heritage Site for its treasure of modern architecture. During the 2026 Iran war, an Iranian missile damaged two Bauhaus buildings in the World Heritage site, killing one person and injuring more than twenty more.

== Adaptation to local climate ==
The architecture had to be adapted to suit the extremes of the Mediterranean and desert climate. White and light colors reflected the heat. Walls not only provided privacy but protected against the sun. Large areas of glass that let in the light, a key element of the Bauhaus style in Europe, were replaced with small recessed windows that limited the heat and glare. Long, narrow balconies, each shaded by the balcony above it, allowed residents to catch the breeze blowing in from the sea to the west. Pitched roofs were replaced with flat ones, providing a common area where residents could socialize in the cool of the evening.

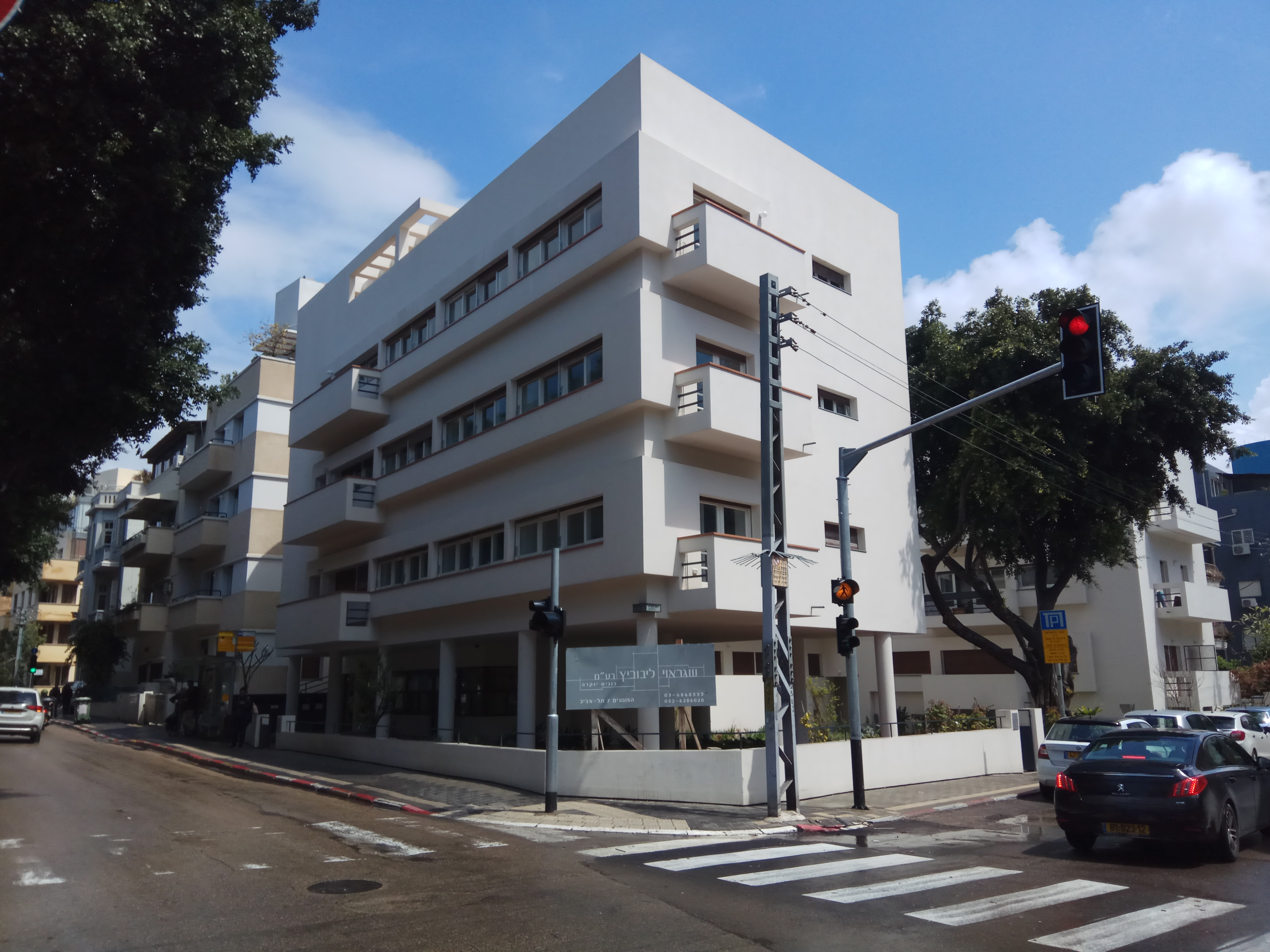
Engel House, designed by Zeev Rechter and built in 1933, is iconic in that it was Tel Aviv's first building to be built on pilotis.

Buildings were raised on pillars (pilotis), the first being the 1933 Engel House designed by Zeev Rechter. These allow the wind to blow under and cool the apartments, as well as providing a play area for children. In 1935, at the office building Beit Hadar, steel frame structure was introduced, a technique which facilitates opening the first floor for such purposes.

The style of architecture and construction methods used in the hundreds of new buildings came to define the character of the modern city. Most of the buildings were of concrete (reinforced concrete was often applied from 1912 on) and in the summer were unbearably hot despite their innovative design features. Tel Aviv's residents took to the streets in the evenings, frequenting the numerous small parks between the buildings and the growing number of coffee shops, where they could enjoy the evening air. This tradition continues in the café society, and nightlife of the city today.

The apartment blocks provided a variety of services such as childcare, postal services, store, and laundry within the buildings themselves. Additionally, having a connection to the land was viewed as extremely important, so residents were encouraged to grow their own vegetables on an allotment of land set aside next to or behind the building. This created a sense of community for the residents, who were in the main, displaced people from differing cultures and origins.

== Preservation plans ==
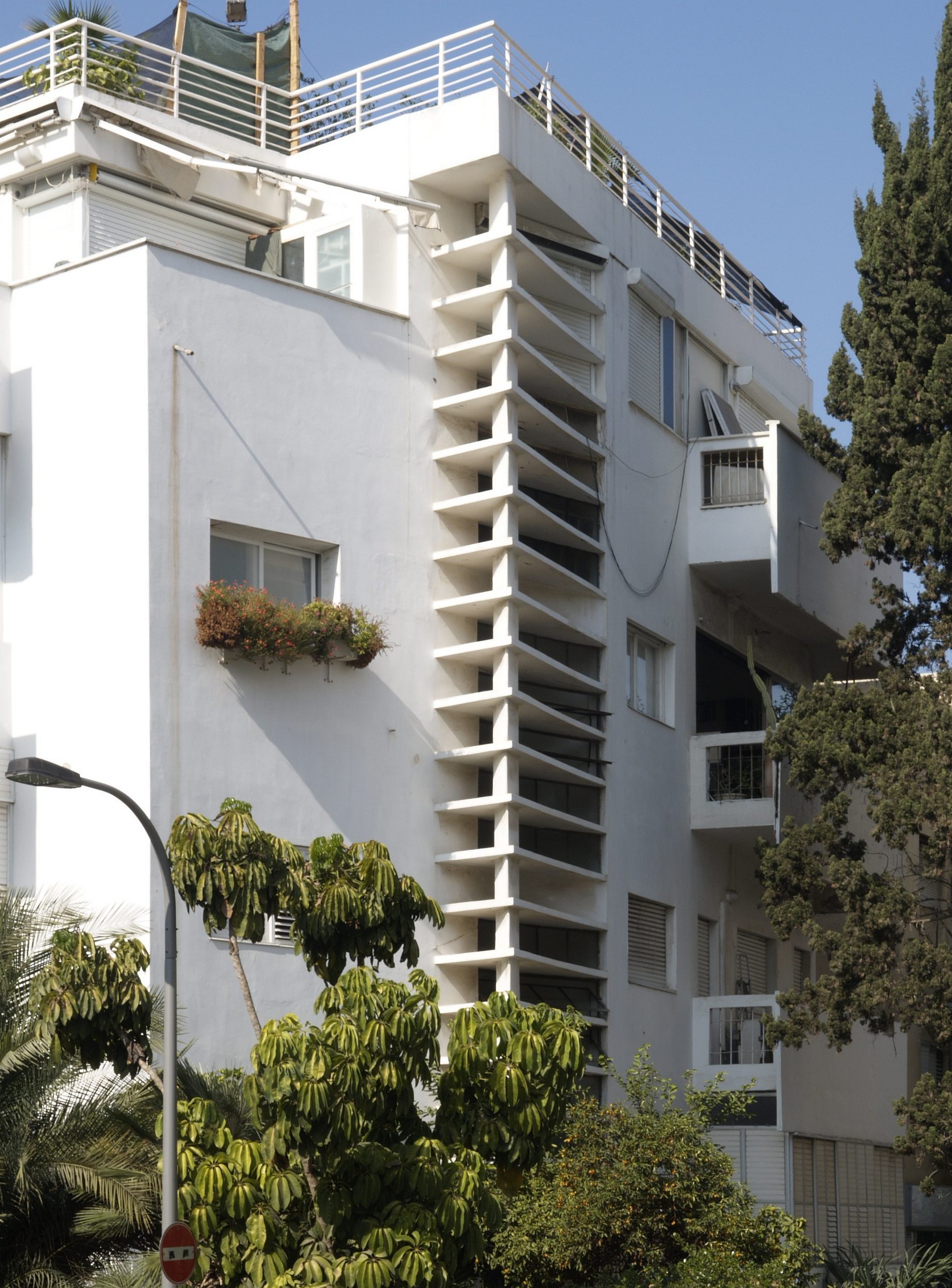
The Thermometer House, named after its harsh vertical lines of diagonal, slatted windows running down its four-story length

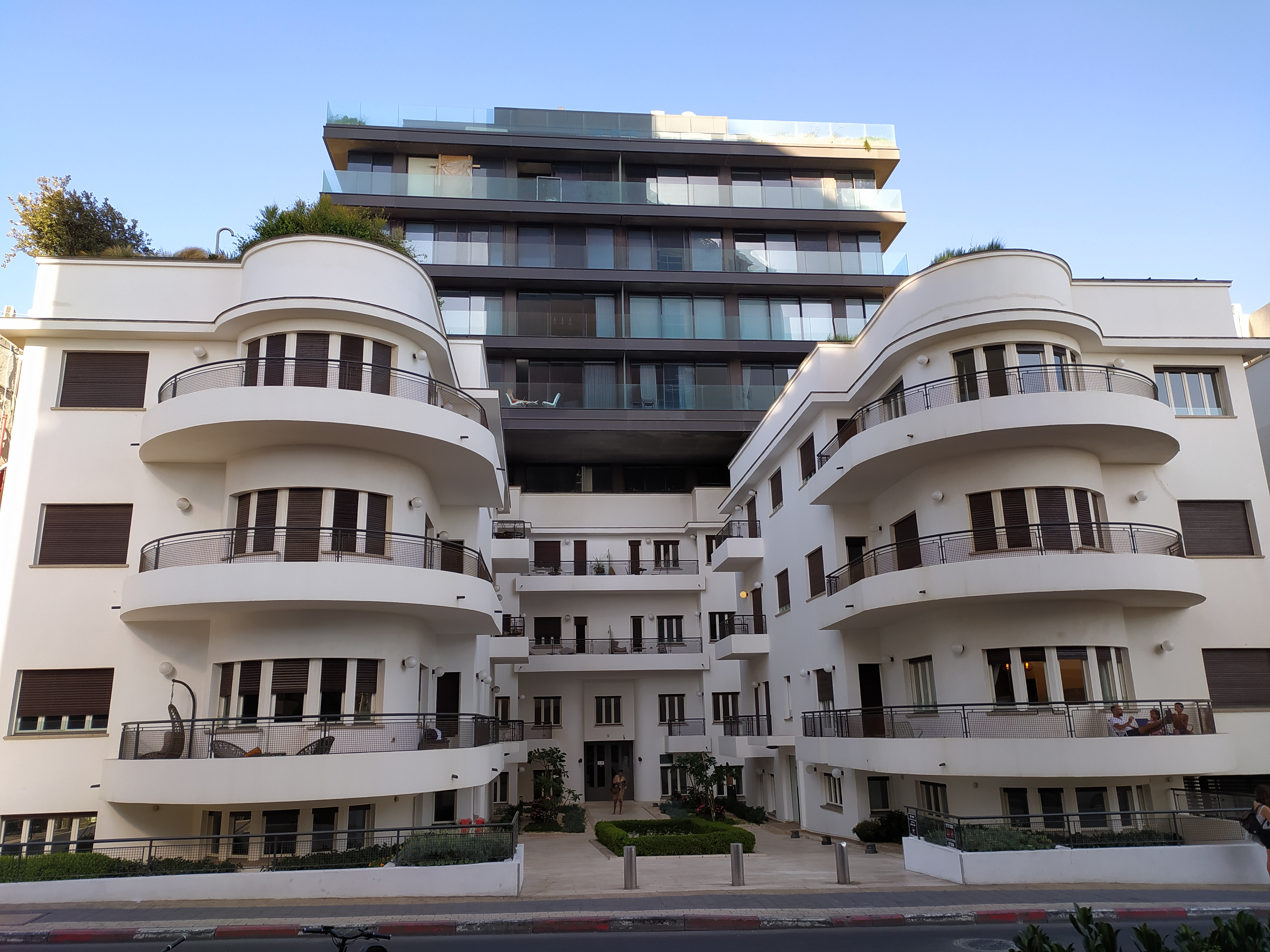
HaYarkon 96, built in 1935 and preserved in 2012.

Many of the buildings from this period, some architectural classics, had been neglected to the point of ruin, and before legislation was passed, some were demolished. However, out of the original 4,000 Bauhaus buildings built, some have been refurbished and at least 1,500 more are slated for preservation and restoration. The municipal government of Tel Aviv passed legislation in 2009 that was supposed to cover some 1,000 structures. In 2015 the German government and the city of Tel Aviv entered into an agreement under which Germany would contribute 2.8 million euros ($3.2 million) towards the preservation project over a ten-year period; some of the money would be used for the establishment of a preservation center in Tel Aviv's Max-Liebling House to foster collaboration among architects, craftsmen and artists. Preservation plans in Tel Aviv must balance the ideals of cultural preservation, and modernization to keep pace with the rapidly progressing world. The panel titled Tel Aviv in 2030 included discussions of restoring the city to provide more places for people to live, due to the destruction of many buildings as a result of a lack of preservation and war conflicts.

== Documentation and exhibitions ==
An architectural survey of the White City by Nitza Metzger Szmuk was later published as a book and formed the basis of an exhibition called "Dwelling on the Dunes". The exhibition opened at the Tel Aviv Museum of Art in 2004 and traveled to Canada, Switzerland, Belgium and Germany.

On the centennial of the founding of Tel Aviv, Docomomo International published Docomomo Journal 40 in March 2009, with most of the coverage in the journal on "Tel Aviv 100 Years: A Century of Modern Buildings".

In 2019, "Form and Light", an exhibit of Yigal Gawze's photographs of Tel Aviv's White City architecture in the 1930s opened at the Museum of Art, Architecture and Technology in Lisbon.

=== Bauhaus Center Tel Aviv ===
Established in 2000, Bauhaus Center Tel Aviv is an organization dedicated to the ongoing documentation of the architectural heritage. In 2003, it hosted an exhibition on preservation of the architecture that showcased 25 buildings. The center is also an independent publishing house on the topics of Bauhaus and International Style architecture and the city of Tel Aviv. As of 2017, it has published more than 15 titles on these subjects.

=== Bauhaus Foundation ===
The Bauhaus Foundation opened a small museum and research center on Bialik Street, near the old City Hall and Bialik House, in 2008.

=== Liebling Haus - The White City Center ===
Liebling Haus - The White City Center is an urbanism and architectural preservation center opened with German support in 2019 in Max Liebling Haus, one of the city's more prominent Bauhaus and International Style buildings, and focuses on Tel Aviv's modernist heritage.

== Architects ==
- Genia Averbuch
- Samuel Barkai
- Jacob Ben-Sira
- Joseph Berlin
- Benjamin Chlenov
- Lotte Cohn
- Moshe Czerner
- Aryeh Elhanani
- Elsa Gidoni
- Pinhas Huett
- Dov Karmi
- Richard Kauffmann
- Yehuda Magidovitch
- Josef Neufeld
- Zeev Rechter
- Mordechai Rosengarten
- Carl Rubin
- Arieh Sharon
- Ben-Ami Shulman
- Munio Weinraub

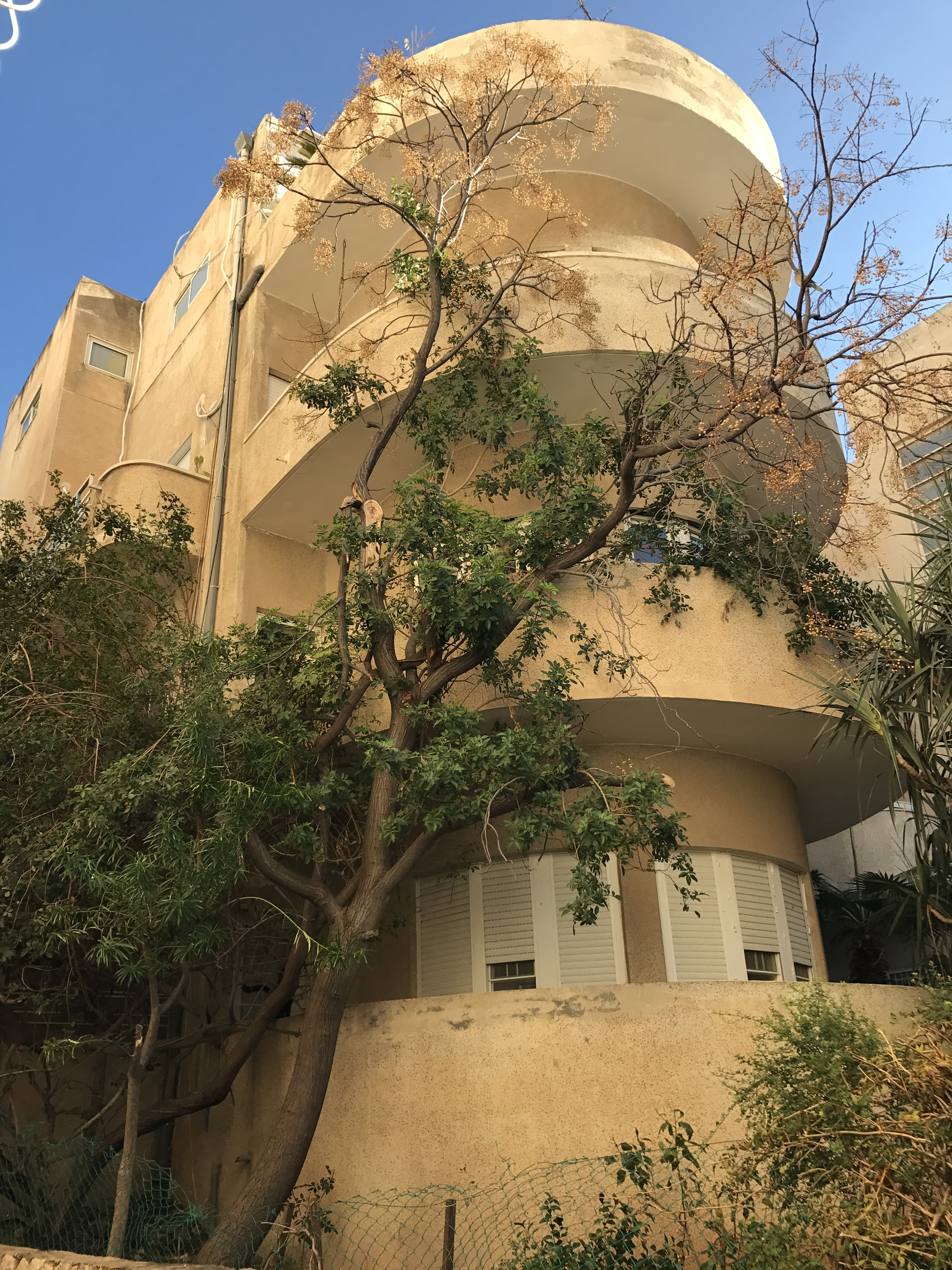
Feldmann house, designed by Eliyahu and Emanuel Friedman, 1934. The building displays typical rounded balconies which also have a climate purpose in shielding the occupants from the sun.

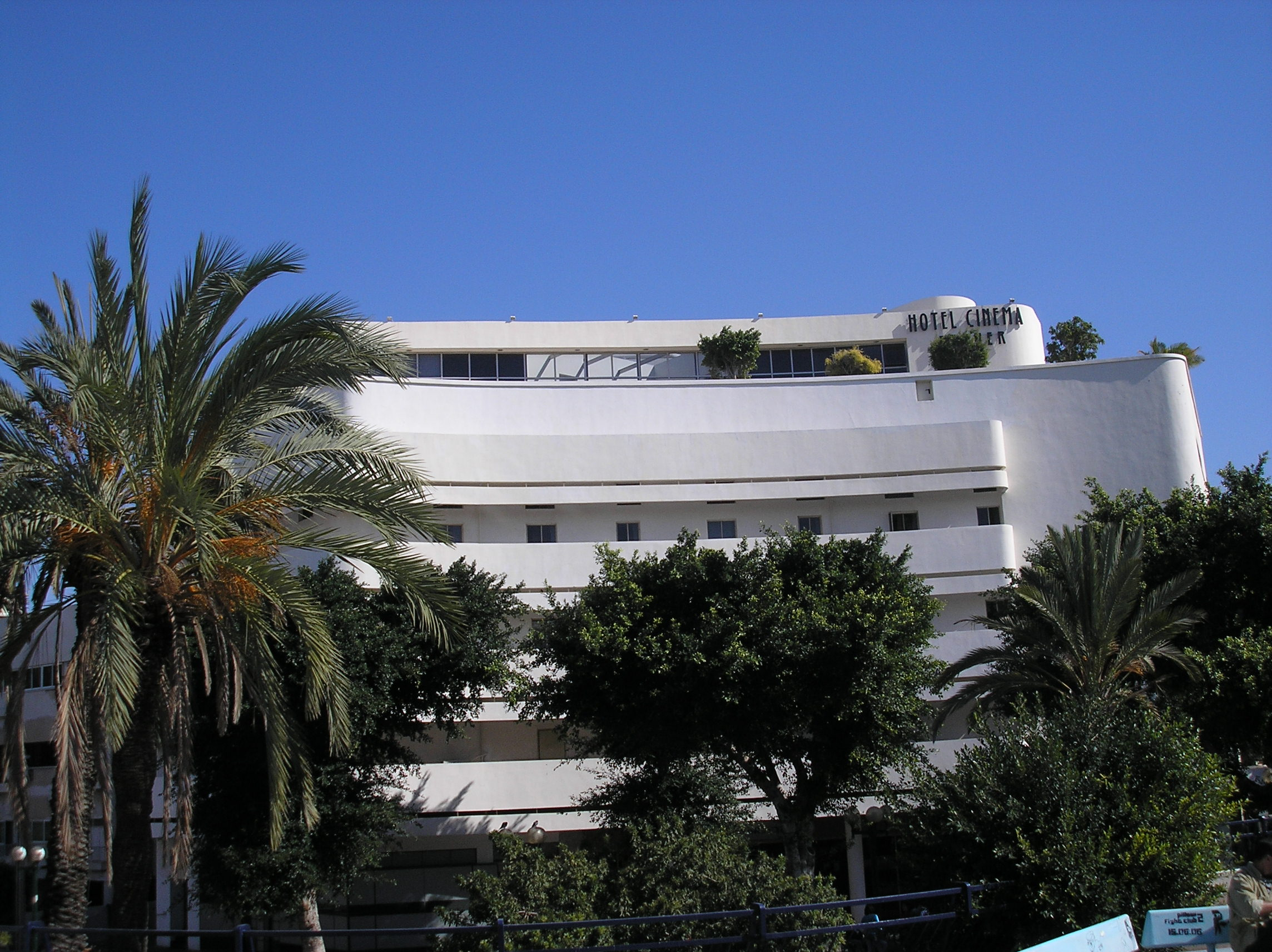
Cinema Hotel, an International Style building completed in 1939, which housed a movie theater

== See also ==
- Geddes Plan for Tel Aviv
- Architecture of Israel
- History of Tel Aviv
- Urban planning of Israel
- Israeli culture
- Södra Ängby, contemporaneous modernist urban villa area in Stockholm, Sweden
