= Daniella Luxembourg =

- Born: 1950 (age 75–76); Israel
- Occupation: art dealer

Daniella Luxembourg (born Israel in 1950) is an Israeli art dealer based in London.

== Biography ==
She was born in Israel. A daughter of Holocaust survivors, she grew up in a suburb of Haifa. She graduated from the Hebrew Reali School in Haifa in 1968. She worked for several museums and art institutions and, in 1984, she launched Sotheby's in Israel, the country's first auction house.

Between 1989 and 1991, she was the founding director of the Jewish Museum in Vienna.

In 1997, art collector Simon de Pury left Sotheby's to start an art advisory company and dealership with Daniella Luxembourg, called de Pury and Luxembourg Art. In 2001, the company merged with Philips Auctioneers, which was named Phillips, de Pury & Luxembourg (from 2001 to 2002) and then Phillips de Pury & Company (from 2003 to 2012). The project it was backed by the LVMH Group, and Luxembourg left it in 2004.

In 2006, she commissioned the sale of Gustav Klimt's Portrait of Adele Bloch-Bauer (1903–07) to the American businessman Ronald Lauder for $135 million. In 2008 she founded the Bauhaus Foundation Tel Aviv, a private museum. She has been a board member of the Courtauld Institute of Art.

In 2009, she opened the Luxembourg & Dayan art gallery together with Amalia Dayan, and soon after Daniella's daughter Alma left Christie's and joined the company. In 2020, Dayan left the company, so it was renamed Luxembourg & Co.

In 2019, she was awarded an Honorary Fellowship of the Courtauld Institute of Art "in recognition of her outstanding contributions to visual arts".

In 2022, she opened a new gallery in New York, at the Fuller Building.
