= Genia Averbuch =

Israeli architect (1909–1977)

Genia Averbuch ג'ניה אוורבוך
- Born: 1909; Smila, Kiev Governorate, Russian Empire
- Died: 1977 (aged 67–68); Tel Aviv, Israel
- Occupation: Architect
- Parent(s): Zeev Averbuch; Zviya Averbuch

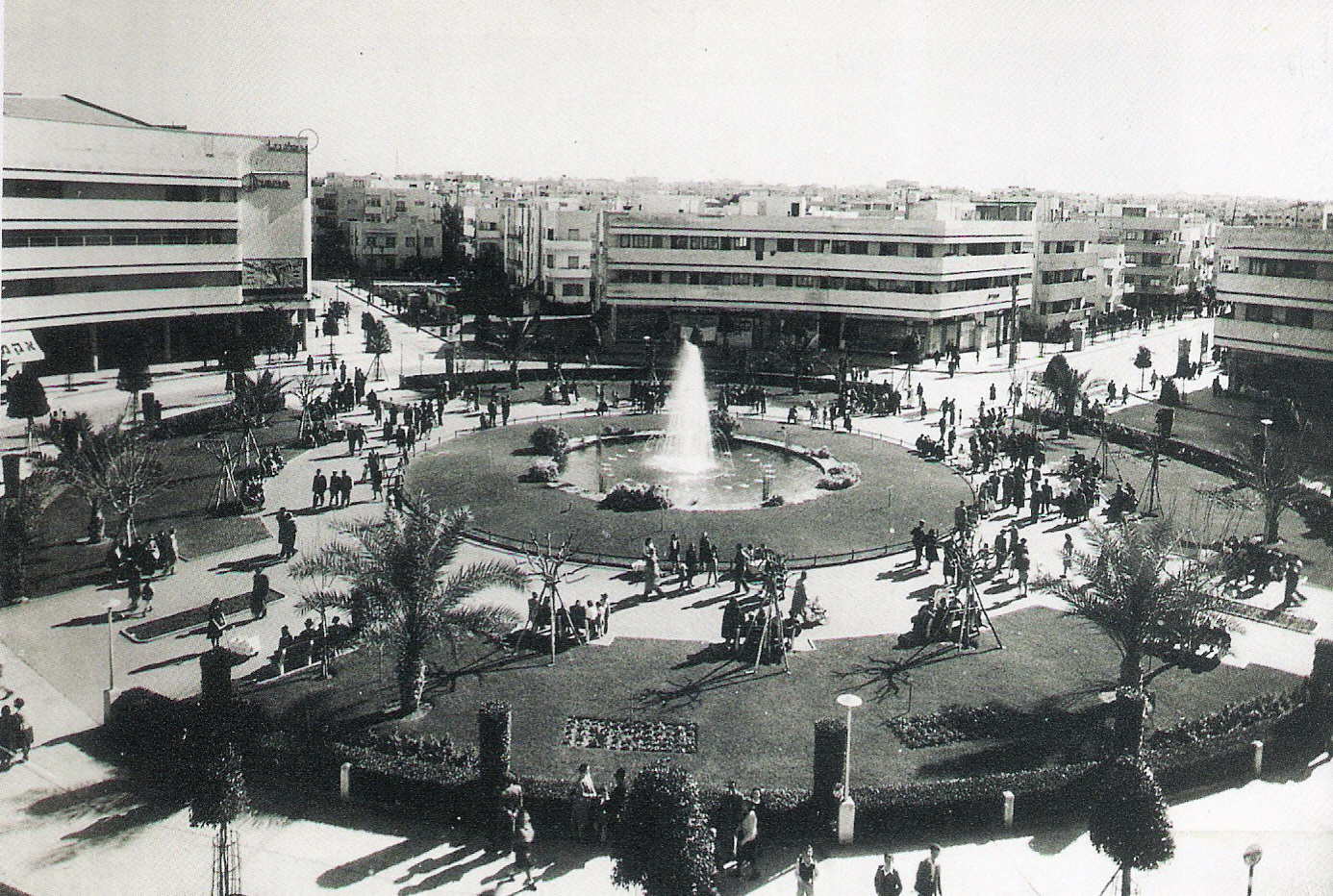
Zina Dizengoff Circle in the 1940s

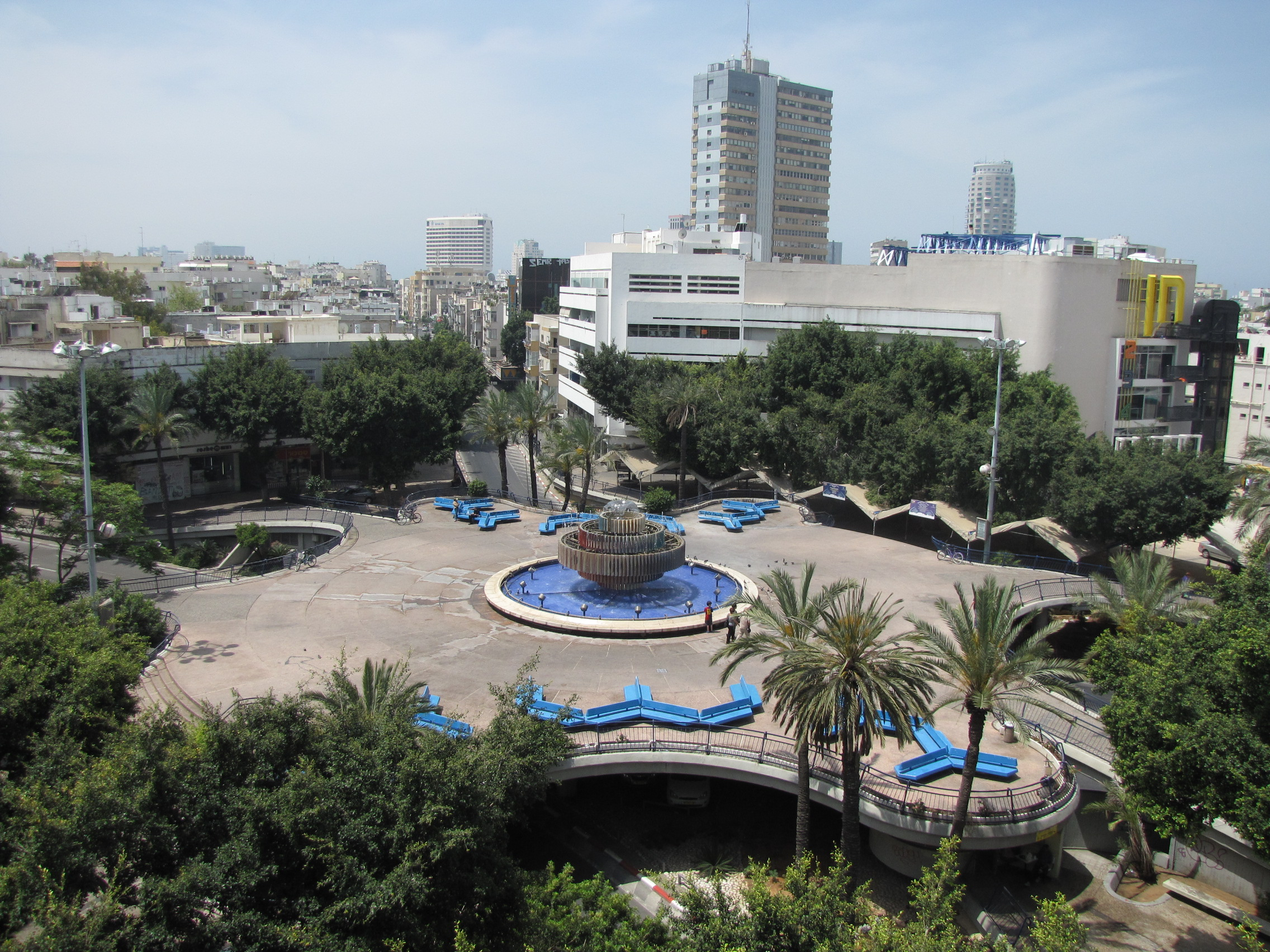
Zina Dizengoff Circle in 2010

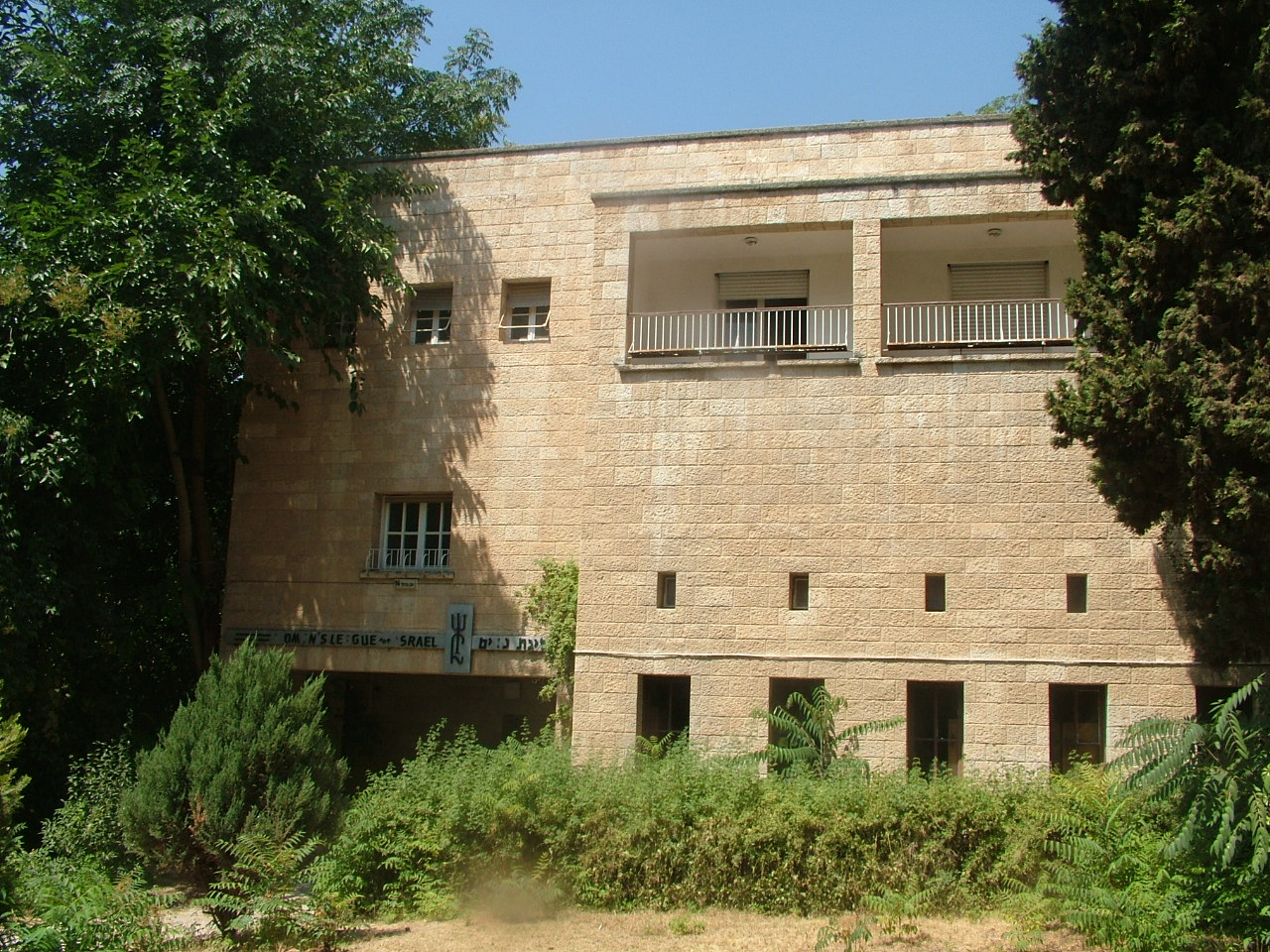
Beit ha-Halutzot 2007

Genia Averbuch (Hebrew: ג'ניה אוורבוך; Russian: Женя Авербух; 1909–1977) was an Israeli architect.

== Early life and education ==
She was born in 1909 in Smila, Russian Empire. Genia Averbuch's family immigrated to Palestine in 1911 when she was two years old and settled in Tel Aviv. Her father, Zeev Averbuch, was the city's first pharmacist, and her mother Zviya was a sculptor. Averbuch grew up and went to school in Tel Aviv, and in 1926, when she was 17, she went to study architecture in the Regia Scuola di Architettura in Rome where other young people from Palestine studied. After two years in Rome, Averbuch continued her studies in Belgium and in 1930 she received a diploma in architecture from the Royal Academy of Arts of Brussels.

== Architecture career ==
In 1930 at the age of 21, Averbuch returned to Palestine and launched her professional career. She worked for two years in the technical department of the Jewish Agency under Richard Kauffmann. After that she opened an independent firm together with architect Shlomo Ginsburg, nicknamed Sha’ag, a graduate of the first class at the Technion and the first architectural faculty in Palestine.

Averbuch was married to Sha'ag for a short period during 1933. Tel Aviv was the urban center and heart of the Jewish community in Palestine. The large immigration wave of middle class German Jews in early 1930s led to a building spurt in the city. Together with Sha'ag, Averbuch designed many apartment buildings and urban villas, and she collaborated with Elsa Gidoni Mandelstamm in designing Café Galina for the Levant Fair in 1934. The structure's white geometry and transparency were typical of the International European style.

In 1934 Averbuch won a competition for the design of a municipal plaza, Zina Dizengoff Circle, which became the city's central public space and symbol of its modernization. In 1935 Averbuch married Haim Elperin, the first commissioner of the Tel Aviv Police and one of the founders of the Israeli Red Cross (Magen David Adom). Their only son Daniel was born in 1936. From 1935 through the end of the 1930s, Averbuch worked with building engineer I. Greynetz, and together they entered several competitions in Tel Aviv. During World War II Averbuch also worked in the Tel Aviv municipal building department.

In 1939 Averbuch won a competition for designing Beit ha-Halutzot (Pioneer Women's House) in Jerusalem. Winning this competition marked the beginning of Averbuch's long-term professional collaboration with women's organizations in Palestine. Between 1939 and 1955, Averbuch designed social institutions for women and children for all the women's organizations in Palestine (except for Hadassah, which did not work with women architects): WIZO, Leni, Moetzet Ha'poalot, the Mizrahi Women's Organization of America and B'nai B'rith Women. Her work includes pioneers' houses (residences for single women) in Jerusalem (1942) and in Netanya (1950), and agricultural youth villages for children and adolescent Holocaust refugees (Kfar Batya, 1945; Hadassim, 1947).

During the 1950s Averbuch continued to design apartment buildings in Tel Aviv, particularly in the booming northern section of the city. In the 1960s she designed two synagogues for the religious Zionist movement and was the second woman to design synagogues in Israel: the synagogue at the first yeshiva high school in Israel, "Midrashat Noam" in Pardes Hannah (1965), and the synagogue at the religious kibbutz Ein HaNatziv (1966).

The partnership between Averbuch and Baron lasted through the mid-1970s. In the 1960s a third partner, Chaim Romem, joined the firm.

During the period of the British Mandate, Averbuch participated in architecture competitions and won many prizes and citations. She was well known and well respected in the professional community. In the mid-1940s she began serving as a professional judge for design competitions. Many of the residential buildings she designed in Tel Aviv are situated in the White City area designated as a UNESCO World Cultural Heritage Site and have been chosen for preservation by the Tel Aviv municipality. In 2013, in appreciation of Genia Averbuch's contribution to Tel Aviv's urban landscape, the city decided to name a circle for her.

== See also ==
- Women of Israel
- Architecture of Israel
