= Bauhaus Strong Coffee =

Coffee shop in Seattle, Washington, U.S.

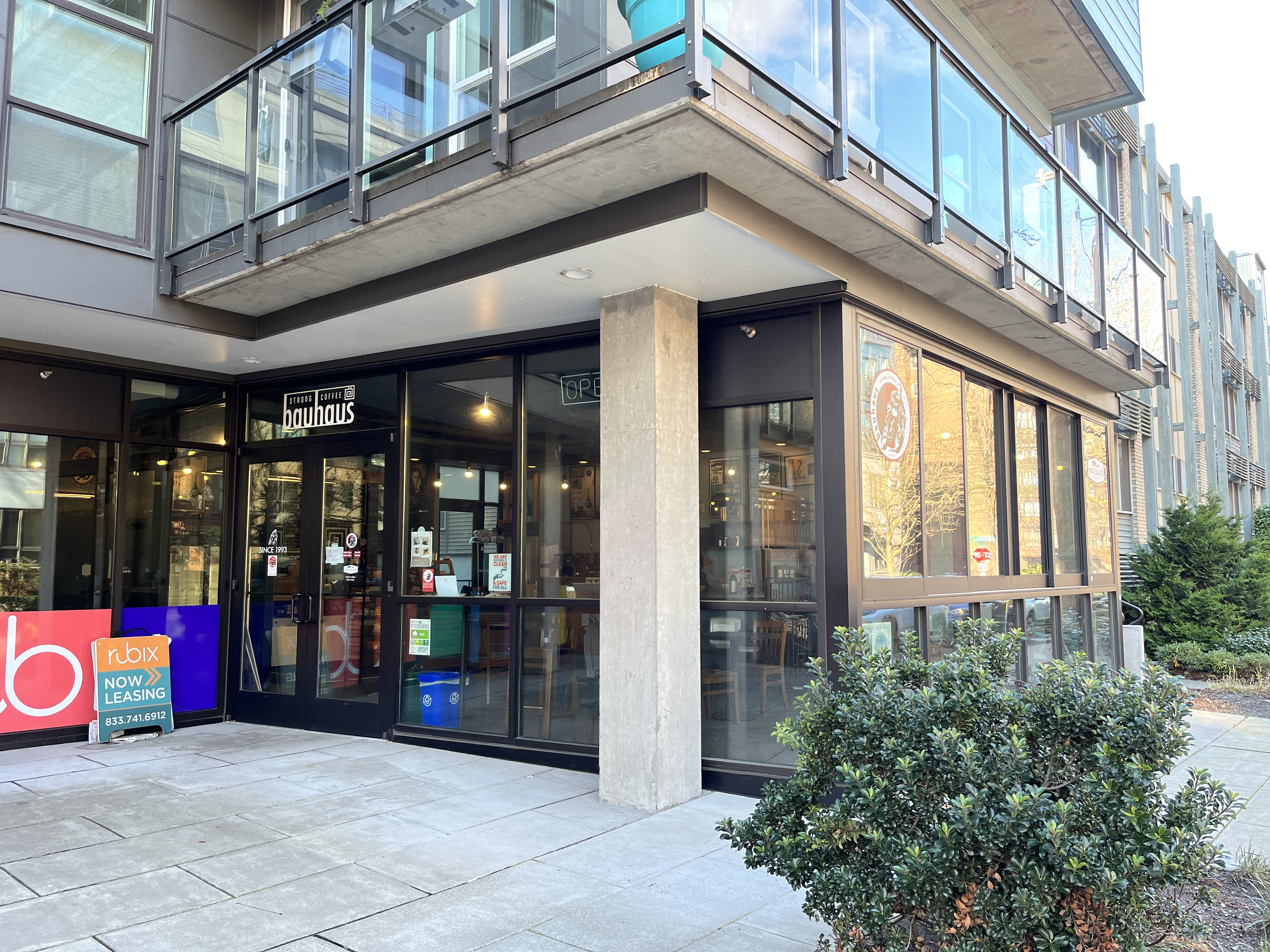
- Exterior of the coffee shop on Capitol Hill, 2023

Restaurant information
- Location: Seattle, King, Washington, United States

Bauhaus Strong Coffee is a coffee company based in Seattle, in the U.S. state of Washington.

== Description ==
Bauhaus has had used book sections. In addition to coffee drinks, the menu has included croissants, scones, and tea. The Ballard location has been described as an "art deco-inspired cafe".

== History ==
Known for its "strong coffee", the business was founded by Joel Radin on Capitol Hill in 1993. After a 20-year run from October 5, 1993 to October 5, 2013, the Melrose and Pine cafe closed. The Ballard location reopened in 2016, and the business began operating on Capitol Hill again in 2019. The Ballard location closed in 2021. The Capitol Hill location has closed and Mintish began operating in the space in 2025.

== Reception ==
The Not for Tourists Guide to Seattle has said Bauhaus is "a little pretentious but so worth it". In 2019, Naomi Tomky included Bauhaus in Thrillist's overview of "Where to Find the Classic Coffee Shops That Made Seattle World Famous". The location on Pine was called "cool and classy".

== See also ==
- List of coffeehouse chains
