= Bauhaus Foundation Tel Aviv =

Bauhaus museum in Tel Aviv, Israel

Coordinates: 32.0730°N 34.7707°E

Bauhaus Foundation, Tel Aviv
- מוזיאון הבאוהאוס
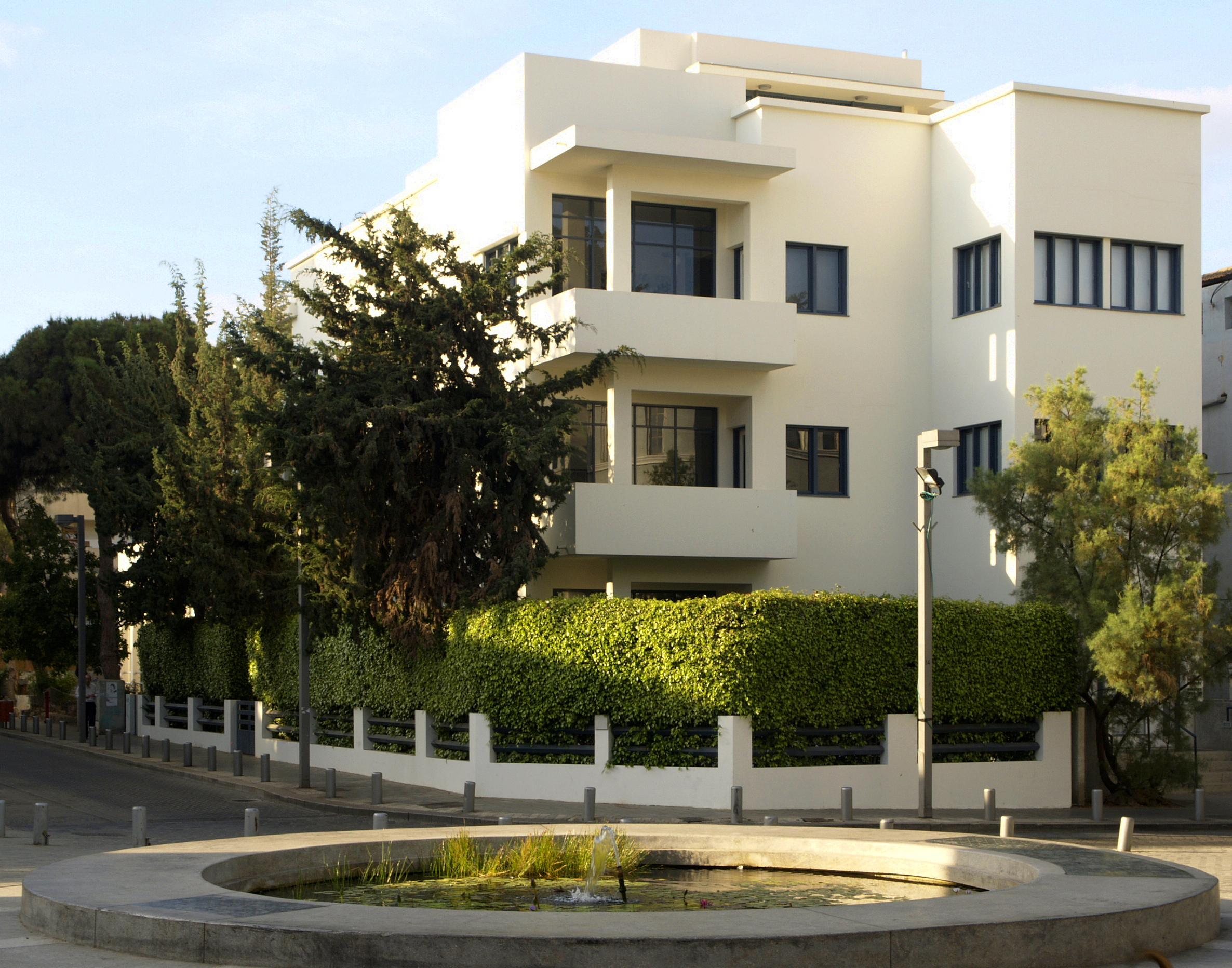
- Established: 2008
- Location: 21 Bialik Street, Tel Aviv
- Website: bauhaus.org.il

The Bauhaus Foundation, Tel Aviv is a private, non-profit museum and research center in Tel Aviv, Israel dedicated to the conservation, study and display of Bauhaus architecture, design, and art. The foundation is located on 21 Bialik Street, adjacent to Bialik House and old Tel Aviv City Hall, in a building designed by Shlomo Gepstein in 1934.

It is owned by American billionaire, businessperson, art collector and philanthropist Ronald Lauder. The initial project was led by Daniella Luxembourg.

The display area of 120 square metres (1,300 sq ft) contains furniture and belongings related to the Bauhaus movement of the 1920s and 1930s, as well as exhibitions about the International Style. Objects and furniture designed by Ludwig Mies van der Rohe, Marcel Breuer and Walter Gropius are included.

== Admission ==
Admission is free. The museum is open four days a week, Wednesday through Saturday.

== See also ==
- Bauhaus Center Tel Aviv
- Max-Liebling House (Tel Aviv)
- White City, Tel Aviv
