= Nitza Metzger-Szmuk =

Israeli architect and preservationist

- ניצה מֶצְגֶר-סְמוּק
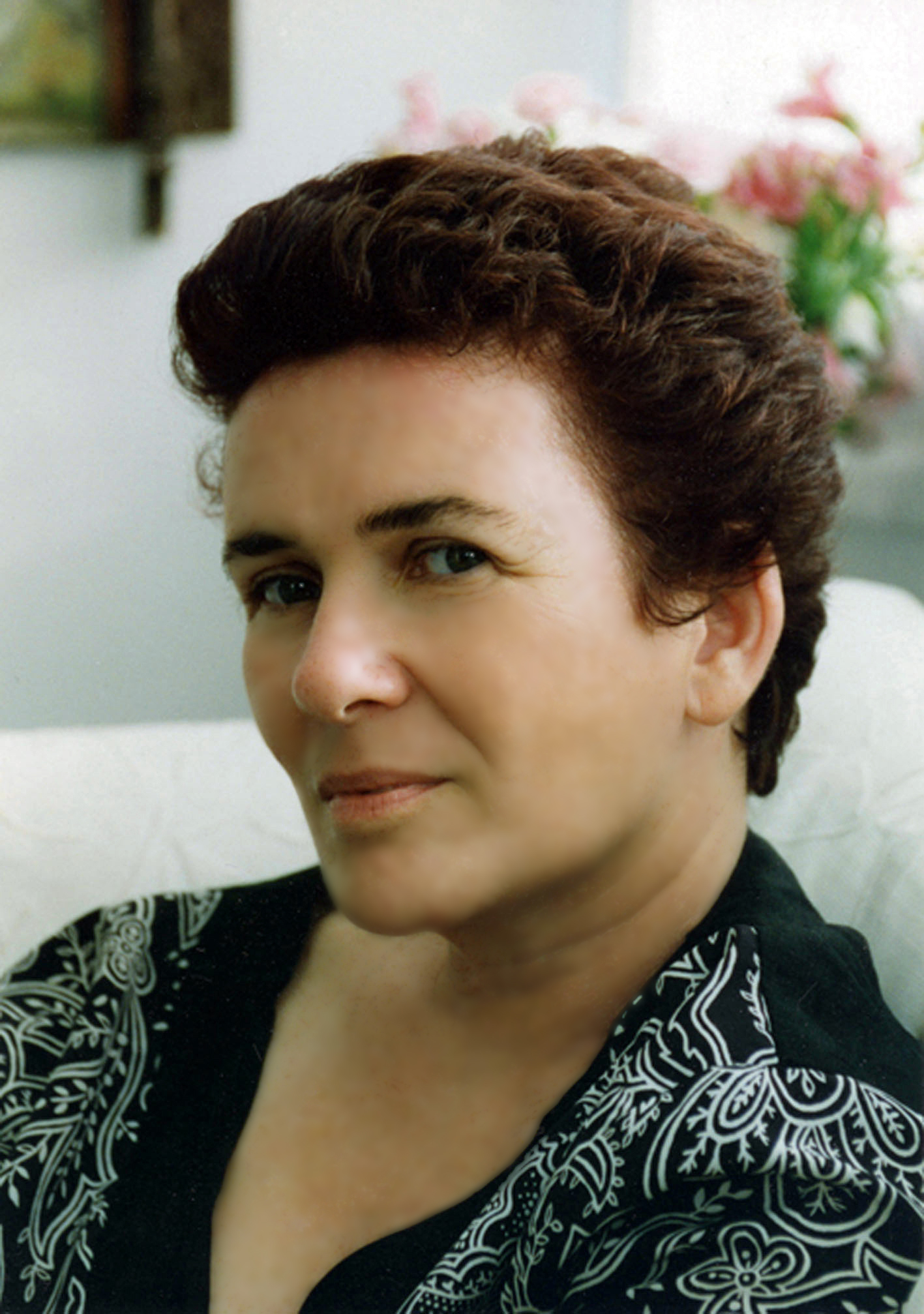
- Metzger-Szmuk in 2006
- Born: 1945 (age 80–81); Tel Aviv, Israel
- Known for: Preservation of Tel Aviv's White City buildings
- Awards: 2006 Emet Prize, 2001 Rokach Prize
- Scientific career
- Fields: Architecture, preservation
- Workplaces: Technion

Nitza Metzger-Szmuk (Hebrew: ניצה מֶצְגֶר-סְמוּק; born 1945) is an Israeli architect, and Emet Prize laureate in architecture for her work on documentation and preservation of Tel Aviv's White City. She also received the Rokach Prize in 2001.

== Early life and education ==
Born in 1945 in Tel Aviv, Israel, she completed her architecture studies at the University of Florence, Italy, in 1978. After graduating she worked at an architectural firm in Florence doing conservation of historic buildings.

== Work in architecture and preservation ==
Upon her return to Israel in 1989, Metzger-Szmuk was employed by the Tel Aviv Foundation for the development of an architectural survey of the city's International Style buildings. The survey served as the basis for the city's preservation plan and for her first book, "Dwelling on the Dunes", which was first published in 1994 and has been published to date in Hebrew, English and French.

Metzger-Szmuk set up the conservation team at the Tel Aviv-Yafo Municipality in 1990 and headed it until 2002. She has been given much credit in the proclamation of "The White City" as a World Heritage Site by UNESCO in 2003.

In 2003 she opened an architectural office, specializing in preservation.

== Academic career ==
In 2005 she joined the Technion as a faculty member. In 2006 she was appointed associate professor. Through 2013 she headed the graduate program in architecture with specialization in preservation.

== Awards ==
- 2006 – The Emet Prize in Category: Culture and Art, Field: Architecture, for her contribution to promoting conservation in Israel
- 2001 – The Rokach Prize for Architecture
- YYYY – Certificate of recognition by the Association of Israeli Architects and Town Planners for her professional contributions to the field of conservation

== Exhibitions ==
Metzger-Szmuk has curated an exhibition carrying the name : "The White City-Tel Aviv's Modern Movement". The exhibition was first held at the Tel Aviv Museum of Art in 2004. Since then it has traveled to Canada, Switzerland, Italy, Austria, Belgium and Germany.

== Publications ==
- Nitza Metzger-Szmuk, Véra Pinto-Lasry, Vivianne Barsky, Dani Karavan, Dwelling on the Dunes: Tel Aviv, Modern Movement and Bauhaus Ideals / Des maisons sur le sable: Tel-Aviv, Mouvement moderne et esprit Bauhaus. Bilingual edition English/French. Editions de l'Eclat, Paris, 2004. 447 pages. ISBN 978-2-84162-077-7
