= Richard Kauffmann =

German-born architect and town planner, active mainly in British Palestine

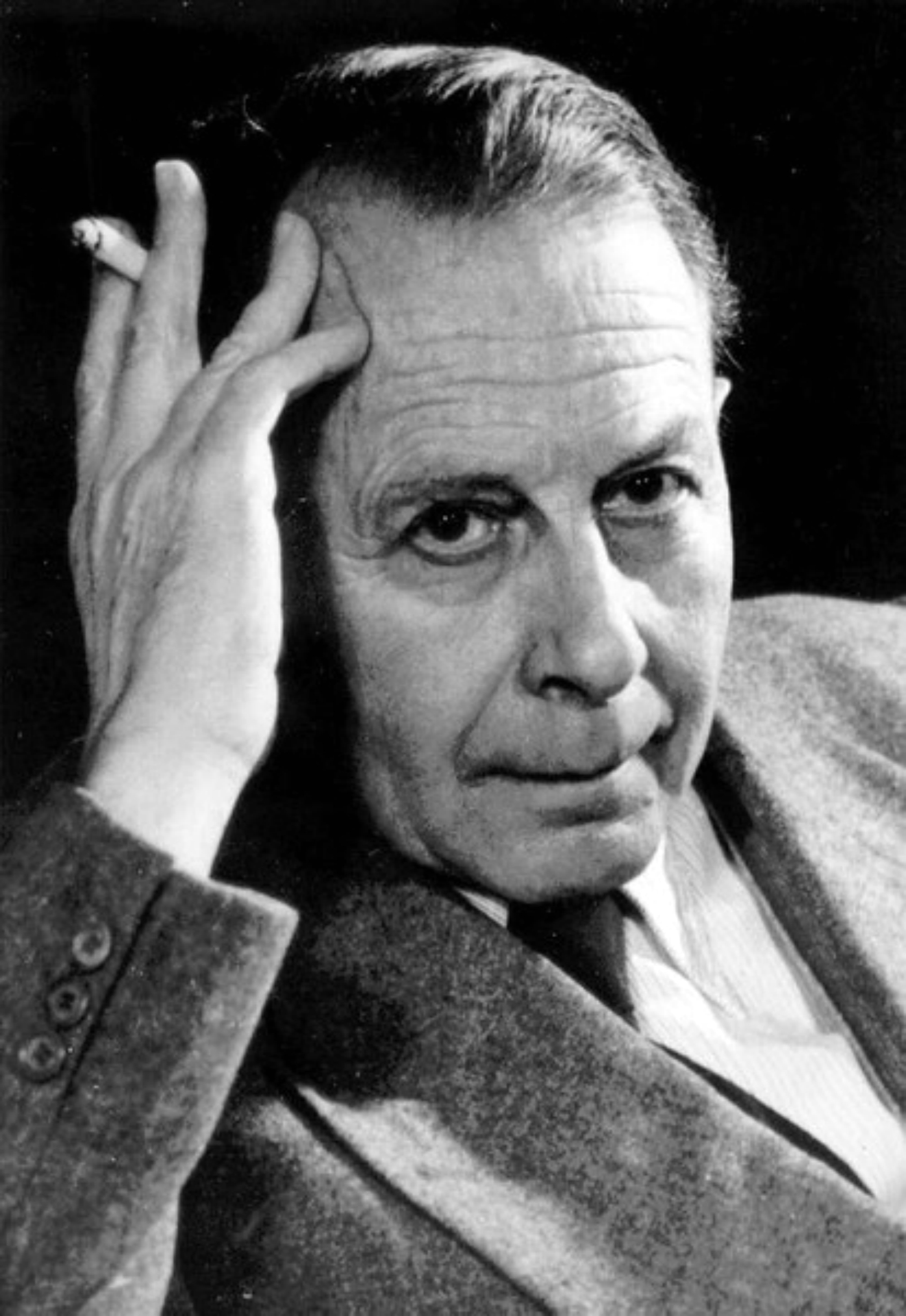
Kauffmann c. 1950–1957

Richard Kauffmann (1887–1958) was a German-Jewish architect who migrated to british mandate of Palestine in 1920. His architecture was influenced by Ludwig Mies van der Rohe, a proponent of the International Style, and was applied to the local landscape, laying the architectural groundwork for the nascent State of Israel as well as that of several cities including Hadar HaCarmel in Haifa, Nahalal, Afula and the White City, as Tel Aviv's International Style architecture became known.

== Biography ==
=== Early life, World War I, work in Europe ===
Richard Kauffmann was born in 1887 in Frankfurt, Germany. In 1907, he began to study art at the Städelschule, but transferred to architecture studies in Amsterdam the following year. In 1909, he moved to the Technical University of Munich, graduating in 1912. In 1914, he opened an office in Frankfurt.

During the First World War Kauffmann fought on the Eastern Front, where he became aware of the persecutions directed against East European Jews.

In 1919, Kauffmann met Arthur Ruppin, who invited him to design new Jewish settlements in Palestine as the leading physical planner of the Zionist enterprise. At that point, Kauffmann was already a government town planner in Christiania, now Oslo, the capital of Norway.

=== Mandate Palestine ===
In 1920, he immigrated to Eretz Yisrael, at that point a British-controlled territory. Between 1920 and 1932, Kauffmann was the chief architect of the Palestine Land Development Company (Hachsharat HaYishuv) of the Zionist movement. Kauffmann designed and initiated, almost alone, a full architectural master plan for the new rural villages of many kibutzim and moshavim in the northern valleys (Jezreel Valley), most notably Ein Harod, Kfar Yehoshua, Degania Alef, Kfar Yehezkel and Nahalal.

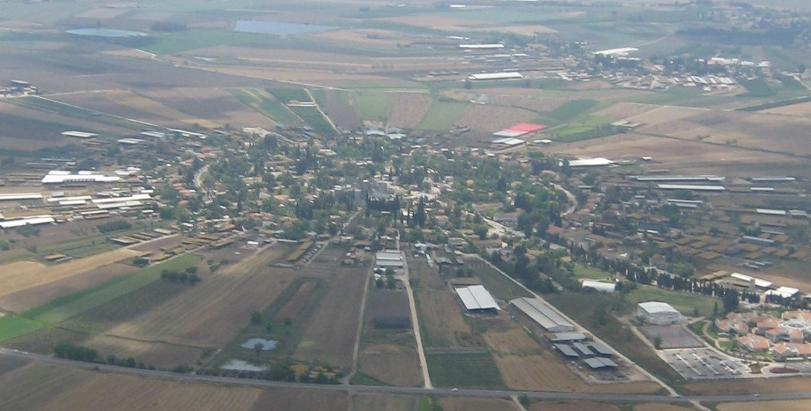
Moshav Nahalal in the Jezreel Valley, designed by Kauffmann

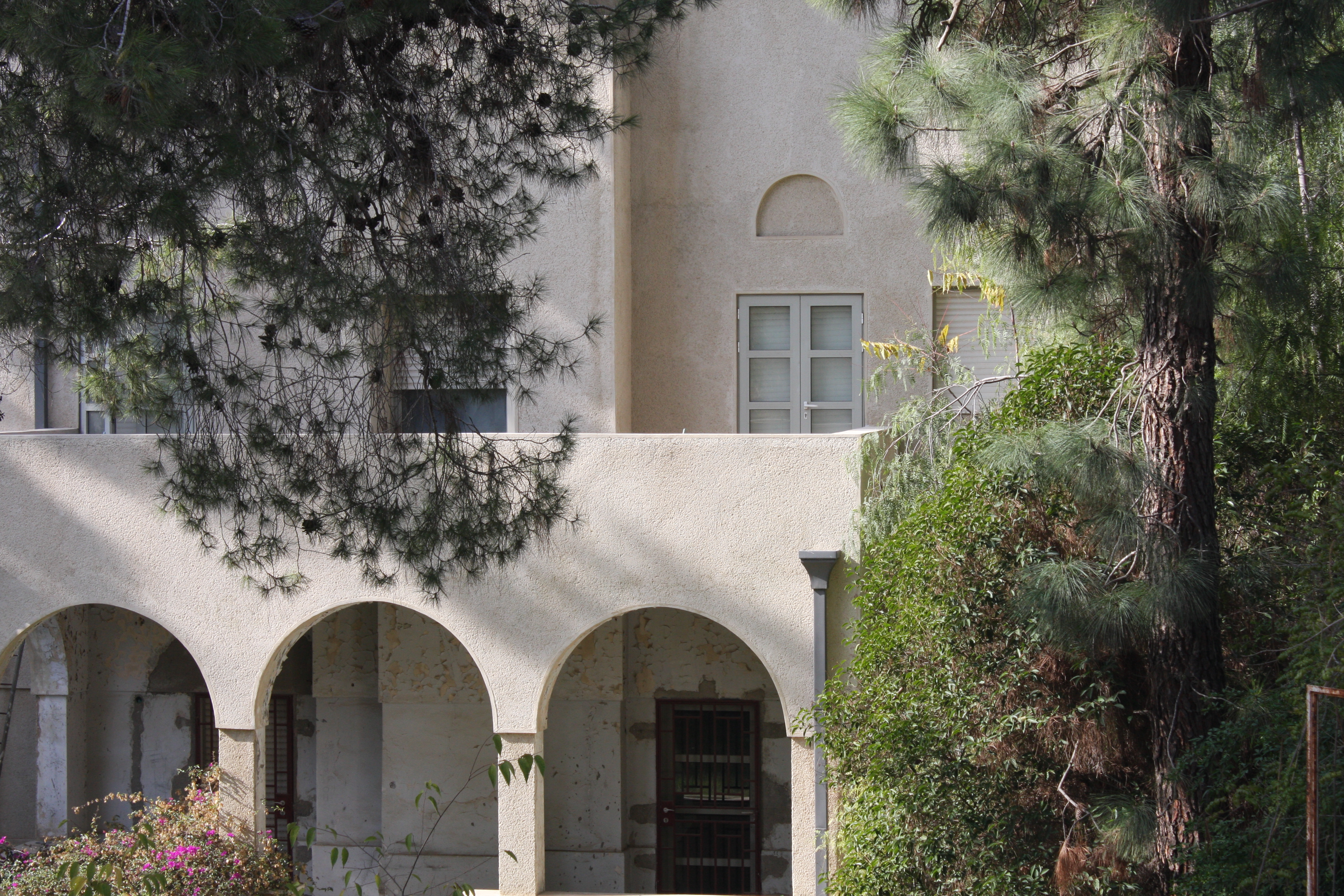
Beit Aghion in Jerusalem, designed by Kauffmann, is the official residence of the Israeli Prime Minister

Nahalal, the first moshav ovdim, was designed in a circular shape, where public buildings were located in the middle surrounded by a circular road, then the agricultural farm buildings were about 20 metres (66 ft) from each other, and then the farms and fields were 45 metres (148 ft) wide and hundreds of meters long, forming a whole shape of sunshine rays.

His designs for the children's house, kindergarten and school in Degania Alef embodied the social and educational principles of the kibbutz movement.

Kauffmann was asked to design the northern neighborhoods of Tel Aviv, based on the urban plans of Patrick Geddes. In 1927, he was appointed a member of the British Mandate town planning committee. He built private residences all over the country and participated in design competitions. He was one of the architects of the Levant Fair (Hebrew Yarid HaMizrah) in 1932–1934. He planned the layout of the pavilions.

Kauffmann designed some new Israeli cities, such as Afula and Herzliya, and neighborhoods in major Israeli cities such as Rehavia, Beit Hakerem, Talpiyot and Kiryat Moshe in Jerusalem, and Hadar HaCarmel, Neve Sha'anan, Bat Galim and Central Carmel in the city of Haifa.

=== Concept and style ===
The main idea in his urban planning was the incorporation of Ebenezer Howard's idea of Garden suburbs, as a manifestation of social ideals, with the ideals of agricultural-Zionist communities, and with the pragmatical needs of the inhabitants of those communities and the settling organizations requests. He was influenced by Neoclassicist architecture, but his urban and agricultural community planning also addressed specific environmental and climate conditions.

== See also ==
- Architecture in Israel
- Hebrew University's Givat Ram campus in Jerusalem, designed by Ossip Klarwein, Richard Kauffmann and Heinz Rau
