= Bauhaus Center Tel Aviv =

Bauhaus information center and gallery in Tel Aviv, Israel

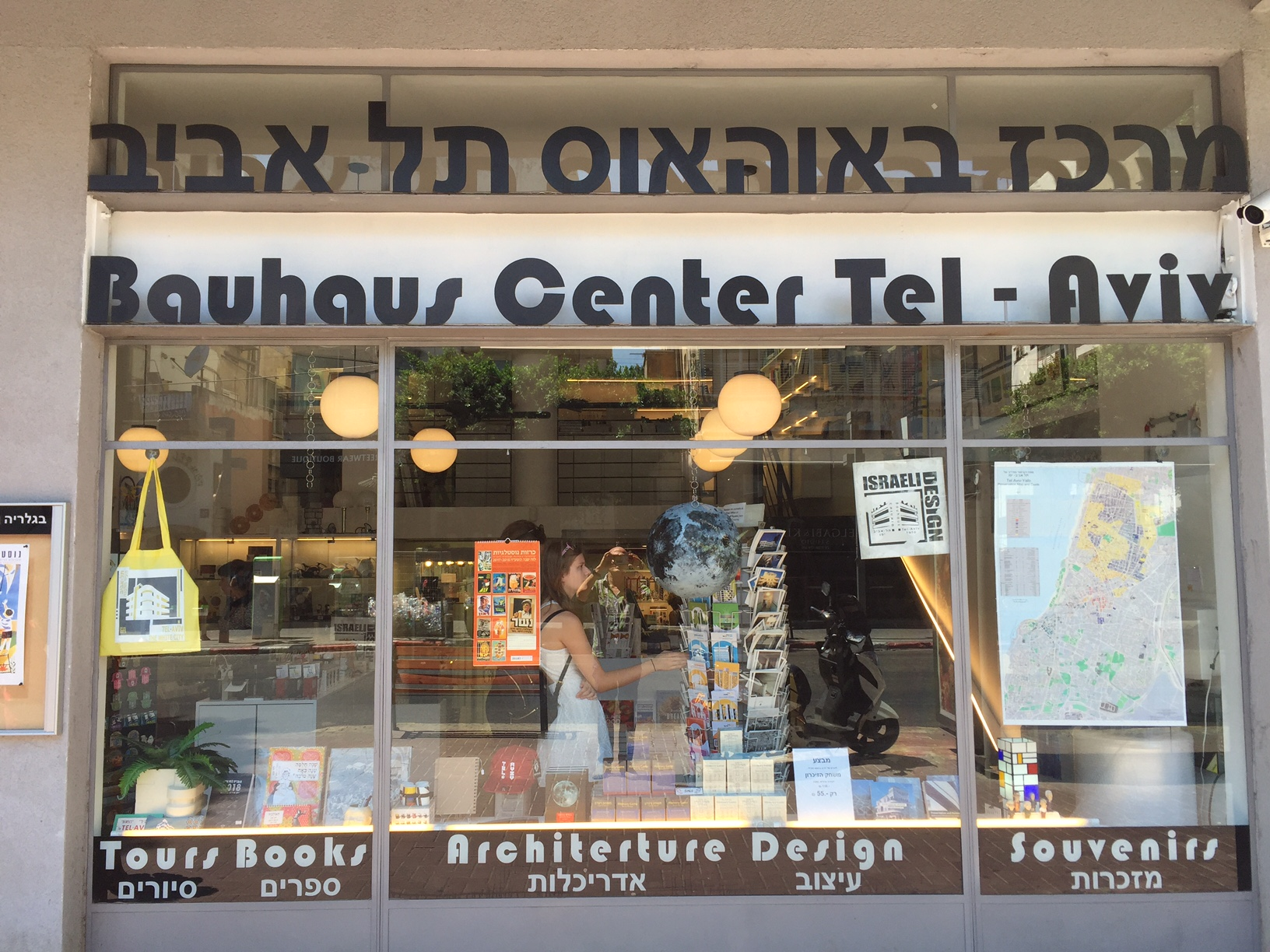
- Bauhaus Center Storefront
- Established: 2000
- Location: 77 Dizengoff Street, Tel Aviv, Israel
- Coordinates: 32.076593°N 34.774371°E
- Type: Architecture
- Directors: Micha Gross, Shlomit Gross, Asher Ben-Shmuel
- Website: bauhaus-center.com

Bauhaus Center Tel Aviv is an organization concerned with Bauhaus architecture and design in the city of Tel Aviv, Israel. Buildings designed in the International Style, commonly known as Bauhaus, comprise most of the center of Tel Aviv known as The White City. The vision behind the Center is to raise awareness of the Bauhaus heritage and be part of the cultural and artistic development in Tel Aviv.

== History ==
The Bauhaus Center, founded by Asher Ben Shmuel, Micha Gross and Shlomit Gross in 2000, is at 77 Dizengoff Street in Tel Aviv, Israel. The founders recognized the need to document the history and patrimony of the Bauhaus architecture in Tel Aviv. They established the Center in order to increase awareness of this, and to expose Bauhaus as a style that crosses boundaries between different art media.

The Center has been collaborating closely with the Israel National Commission for UNESCO since the designation of Tel Aviv as a World Heritage Site in 2003. The Center also cooperates with the Municipality of Tel Aviv and several educational institutions, galleries, museums and associations of engineering and architecture.

The center was formerly located at both 99 and 155 Dizengoff St.

== Structure ==
- Bookstore and Library - The Center's bookstore specializes in design, architecture and the city of Tel Aviv. Its library contains archival material about the Bauhaus era in the city as well as rare books about the subject. The Center also acts as an independent publishing house for books about Bauhaus architecture and design, and the City of Tel Aviv.
- Gallery - The gallery shows documentary exhibitions on Tel Aviv and its architecture, culture, people, design and photography.
- Tours - The Center conducts walking tours around the White City showing prominent Bauhaus buildings, built during the 1930s and 1940s. There are also self-service tours in the area of Dizengoff Square using an audio guide.
- Shop - The Bauhaus shop hosts a collection of items of a wide variety of purposes including fashion, interior design, Judaica and jewelry. It offers to local artists and designers a space to show, promote and sell their works to the public.

== See also ==
- Bauhaus Foundation Tel Aviv
- Max-Liebling House
- Architecture in Israel
- Tourism in Israel
- Culture of Israel
