= Old North, Tel Aviv =

Neighborhood of Tel Aviv, Israel

Old North הצפון הישן
- Neighborhood
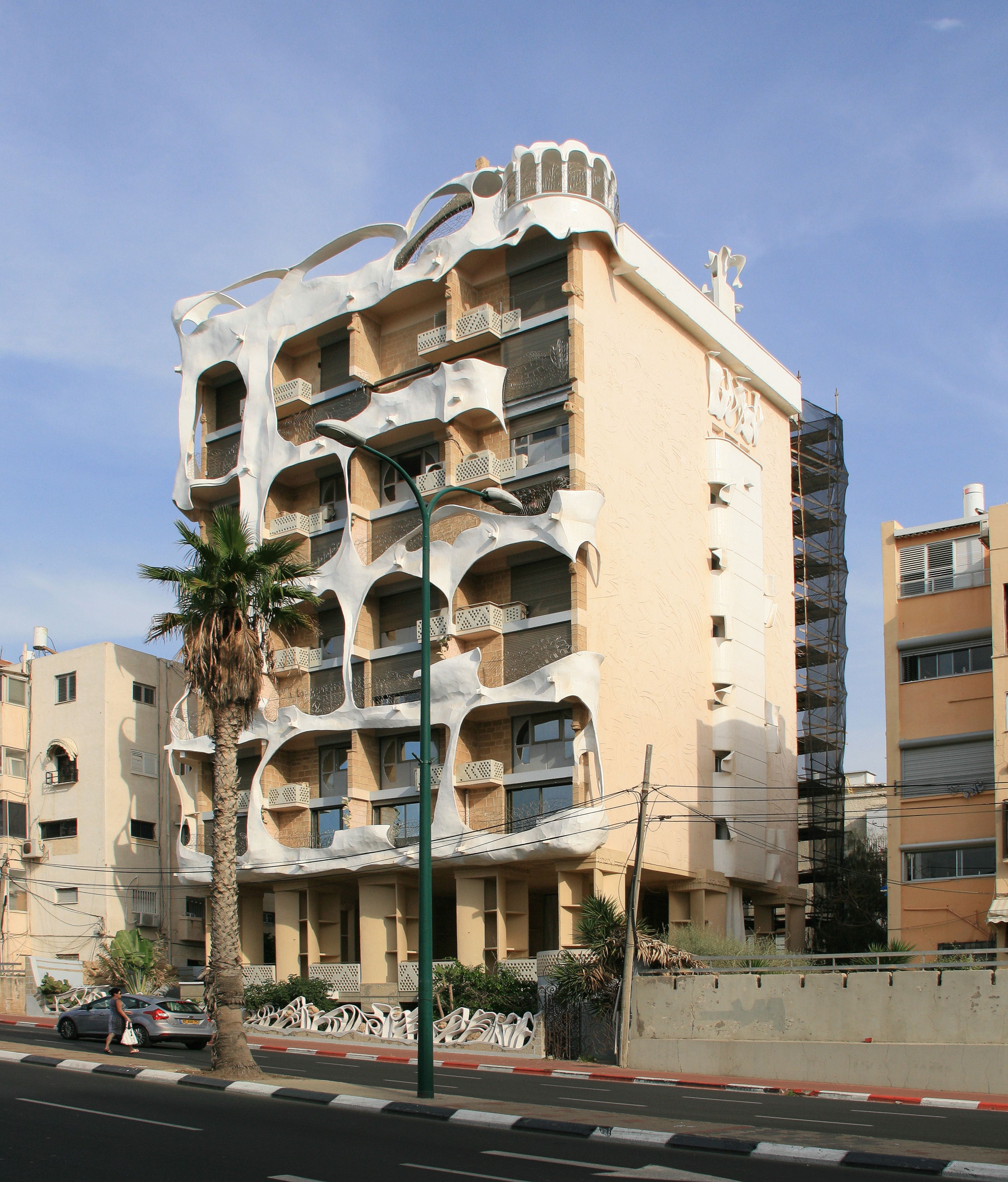
- The Crazy House building on HaYarkon Street
- Interactive map of Old North
- Country: Israel
- City: Tel Aviv
- Established: 1930s

Old North (Hebrew: הצפון הישן, romanized: HaTzafon HaYashan) is a neighborhood in Tel Aviv built during the 1930s and 1940s and is located north of the city centre. This neighborhood received its name following the development of the New North neighborhoods to the East. The neighborhood is bound by the Yarkon River in the North, Bograshov Street in the South, Ibn Gabirol Street in the East and the Mediterranean Sea to the West.

== History ==
In the late 1920s, development in the region was first proposed in the Geddes Plan for Tel Aviv, where the neighborhood would be a garden city with a network of parallel or perpendicular streets. The neighborhood was built during the 1930s and 1940s as Tel Aviv began to expand outside its city centre.

This neighborhood is popular with English speakers, with the first all-English bookstore in Tel Aviv being opened here.
