= Urban planning in Israel =

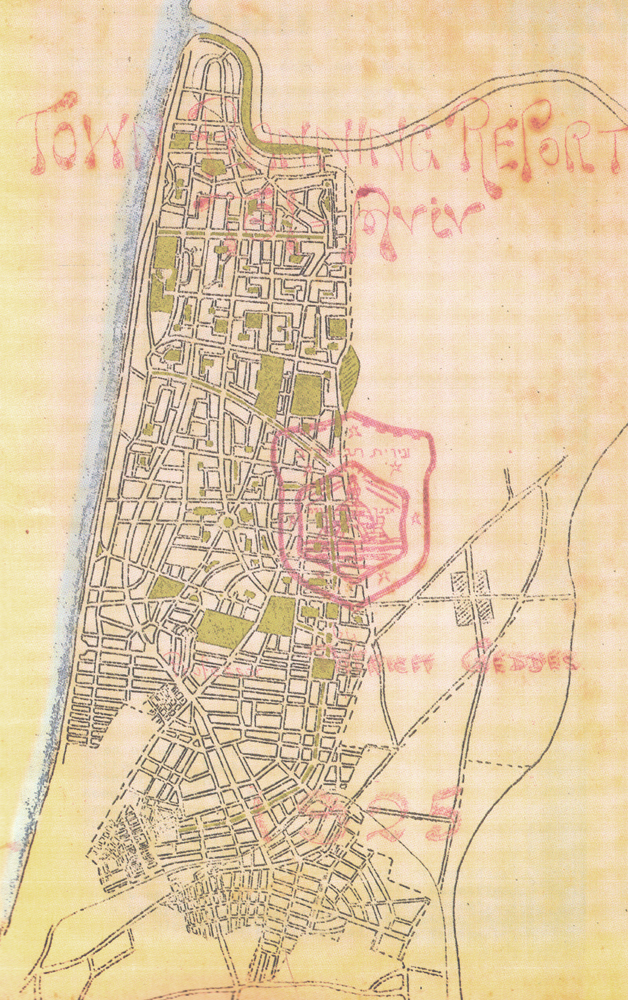
Patrick Geddes' plan for Tel Aviv, 1925

Urban planning in Israel relates to the practice and history of urban planning in the country.

The 1925 masterplan for Tel Aviv by Patrick Geddes is considered to be a modernist milestone and one of the modernists' only successful urban plans.

== Urban planning in Tel Aviv ==
=== Geddes Plan for Tel Aviv ===
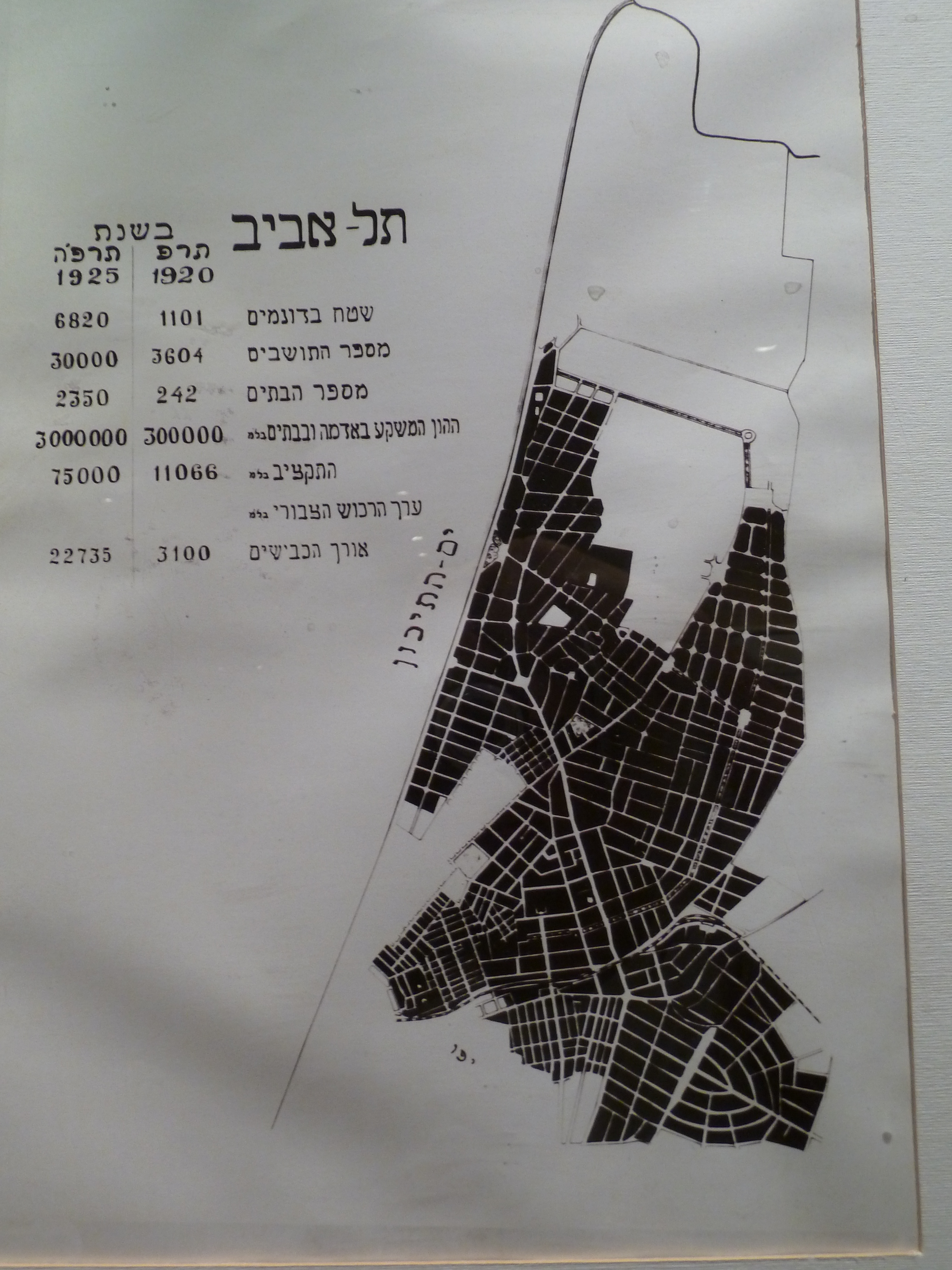
Tel Aviv prior to the Geddes Plan in 1925

The Geddes Plan, formulated by Scottish biologist, sociologist and urban planner Sir Patrick Geddes in 1925, was the first formal master plan for the city of Tel Aviv. Commissioned by the municipality, the plan was developed to guide the city's expansion from its original nucleus near Jaffa northward to the Yarkon River, and between Ibn Gabirol Street in the east and the Mediterranean Sea in the west. The plan integrated both traditional urban qualities such as pedestrianism and human scale building and street proportions along with several garden city movement ideals which include the integration of greenery and gardens into the urban sphere.

Geddes used numerous superblocks, large urban blocks bordered by wide arterial roads, within which a network of narrow, curved internal streets discouraged vehicular through-traffic and encouraged pedestrian activity. The street system was organized hierarchically, including:

- Major roads to support citywide mobility along north–south and east–west axes.
- Secondary boulevards, often tree-lined, designed for pedestrian movement and green corridors.
- Tertiary lanes within superblocks, arranged irregularly to enhance airflow, limit traffic, and promote local access and local community.

Plots were generally around 560 square meters, with building coverage limited to approximately one-third of the lot. Geddes sought to reflect in part the ideals of the Garden city movement as he interpreted it. In every block he placed a local garden of different shapes and of different centrality. These gardens provide local lungs and a break from the intensive city. Geddes believed these gardens could promote health, recreation, and social engagement. Geddes viewed these spaces not only as important spheres of community life to community life but also as a cost-effective alternative to extensive street networks.

The plan prioritized pedestrian movement and minimized dependence on private vehicles. Geddes emphasized neighborhood identity and walkability, envisioning a city that functioned primarily on a human scale and placed community life at its core.

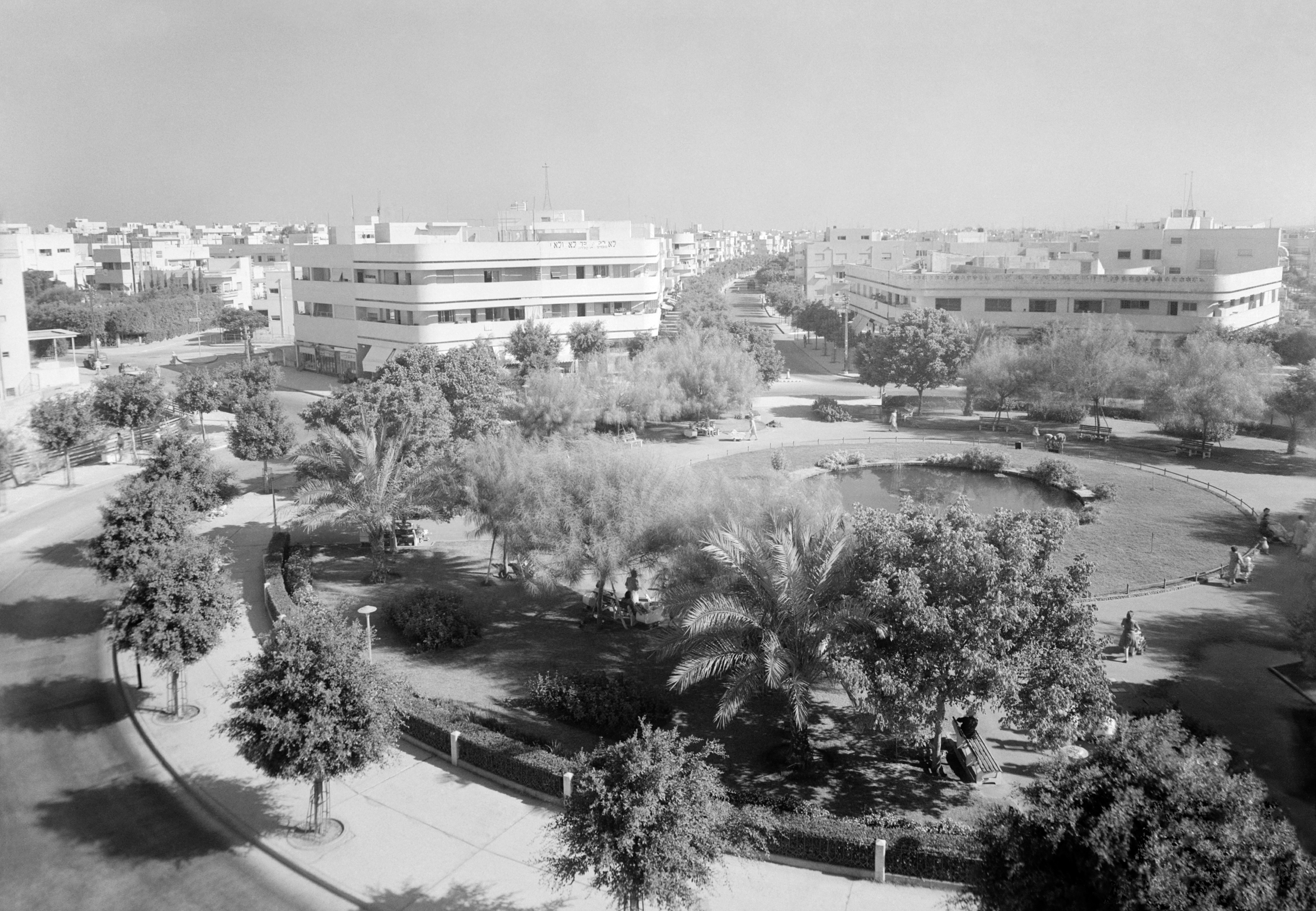
Zina Dizengoff Square, Tel Aviv

The plan included the creation of cultural and civic centers to serve as focal points for the urban population. These include Habima square where the Habima theatre, Israel philharmonic and part of the Tel Aviv museum sit as well as Dizengoff Square, a circle designed as a central plaza connecting Tel Aviv's historical and new districts.

==== Implementation and modifications ====
The Geddes Plan was mostly implemented in accordance to the original plan. The city grew rapidly during the 1930s immigration waves and thus the plan underwent adaptations and changes. These included the construction of taller buildings (increasing from the planned two to four stories), expanded building footprints, and, in some cases, the repurposing of designated open spaces for commercial uses to accommodate higher density. Despite these modifications, the core principles of the Geddes Plan such as superblocks, pedestrian-friendly design, and integrated greenery remained intact in the Old North. The flexibility built into the plan allowed the city to evolve while retaining neighborhood integrity, livability, and environmental quality. Geddes's Tel Aviv masterplan is noted as having anticipated several elements of contemporary urbanism, including community-centered design, environmental responsiveness, and walkability. The Geddes Plan is considered a significant success in urban planning history according to Welter. It successfully established a coherent urban structure capable of accommodating demographic growth without sacrificing quality of life. UNESCO recognized White City of Tel Aviv covers a significant part of his plan while the Old North is viewed as a model of balanced, livable development.

== Urban planning in Jerusalem ==
=== Ottoman period ===
In the late Ottoman period, Jerusalem's development mostly took place within the Old City walls' limits. Jerusalem was within the Ottoman walls, however some Jews established themselves west of the city in protected structures to protect themselves from raids.

=== British mandate ===
This pattern changed significantly following the British occupation in 1917. The first attempt at structured urban planning came with William McLean's 1918 plan, which introduced formal zoning to Jerusalem. His design divided the city into distinct zones: the historic core, a surrounding buffer in which construction was restricted, and areas designated for future development, primarily to the west. According to Efrat, McLean's plan was more general urban layout than a detailed plan.

By the 1940s, further planning by Clifford Holliday and Henry Kendall continued this westward momentum. These plans expanded transportation infrastructure, increased suburban zoning for Jewish neighborhoods, and relocated the city's functional nucleus toward the west, away from traditional areas like the Damascus Gate. The plans also maintained the green belt around the old city.

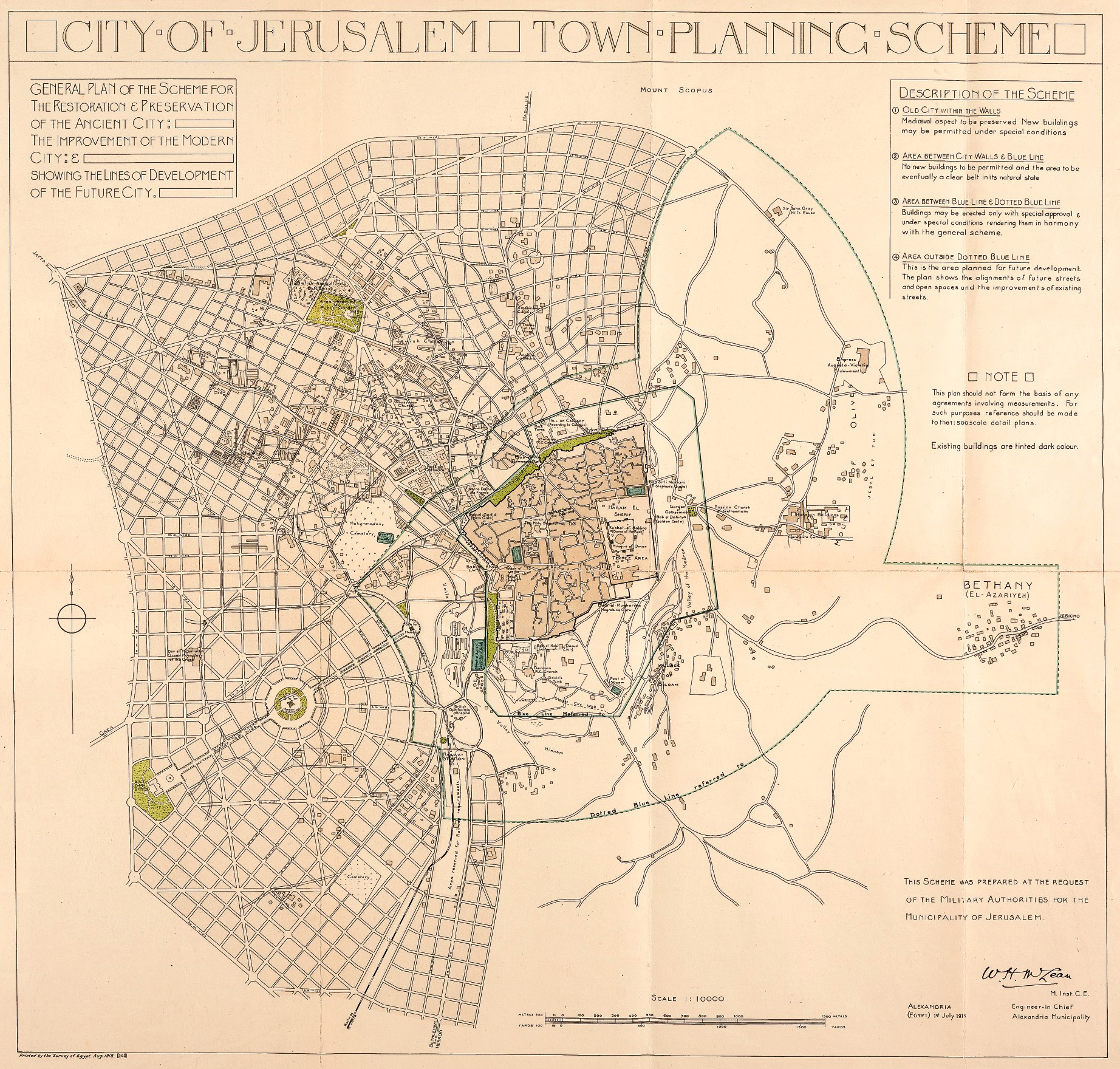
McLean plan, 1918

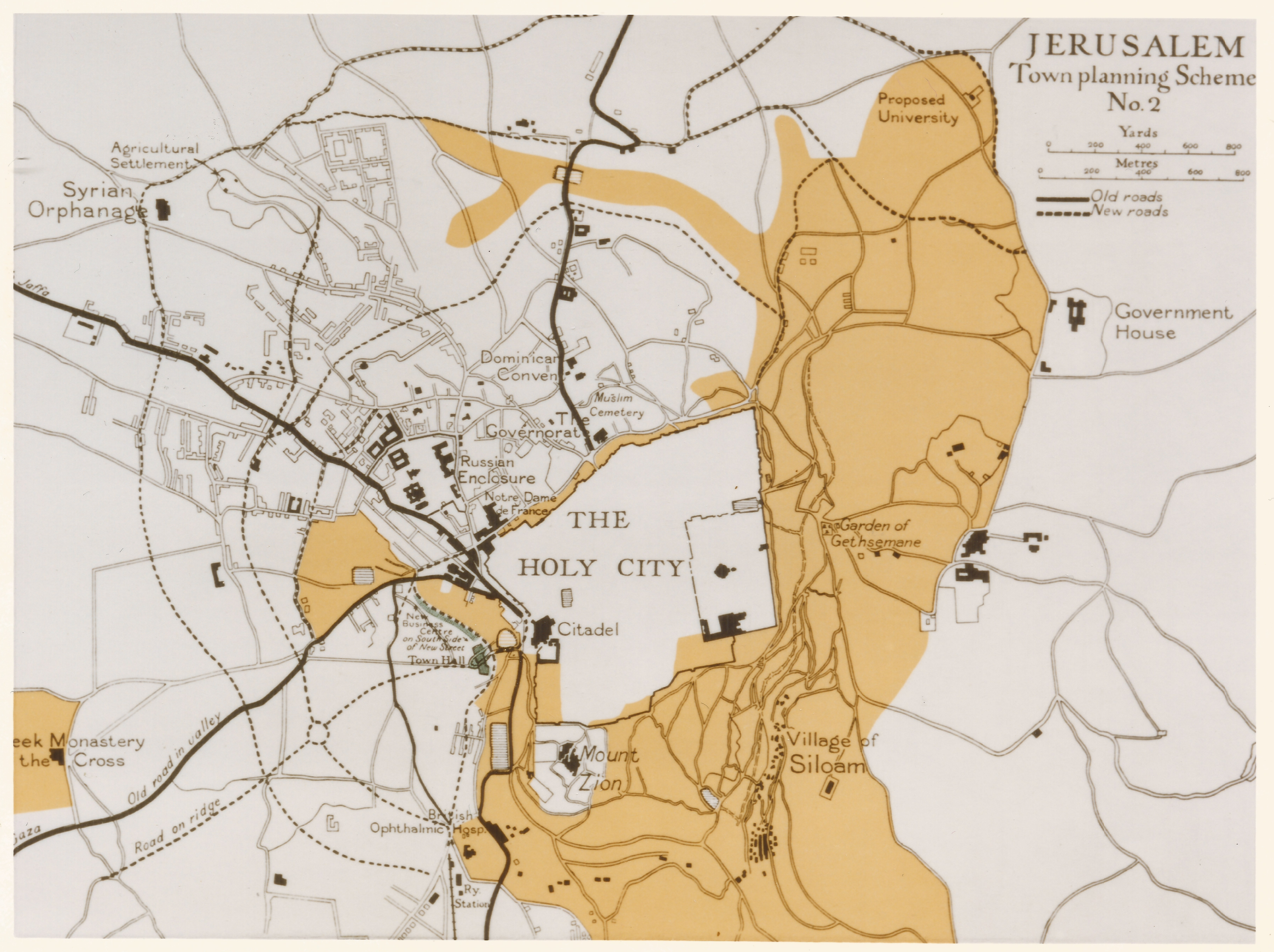
Proposed plan by Patrick Geddes, 1919

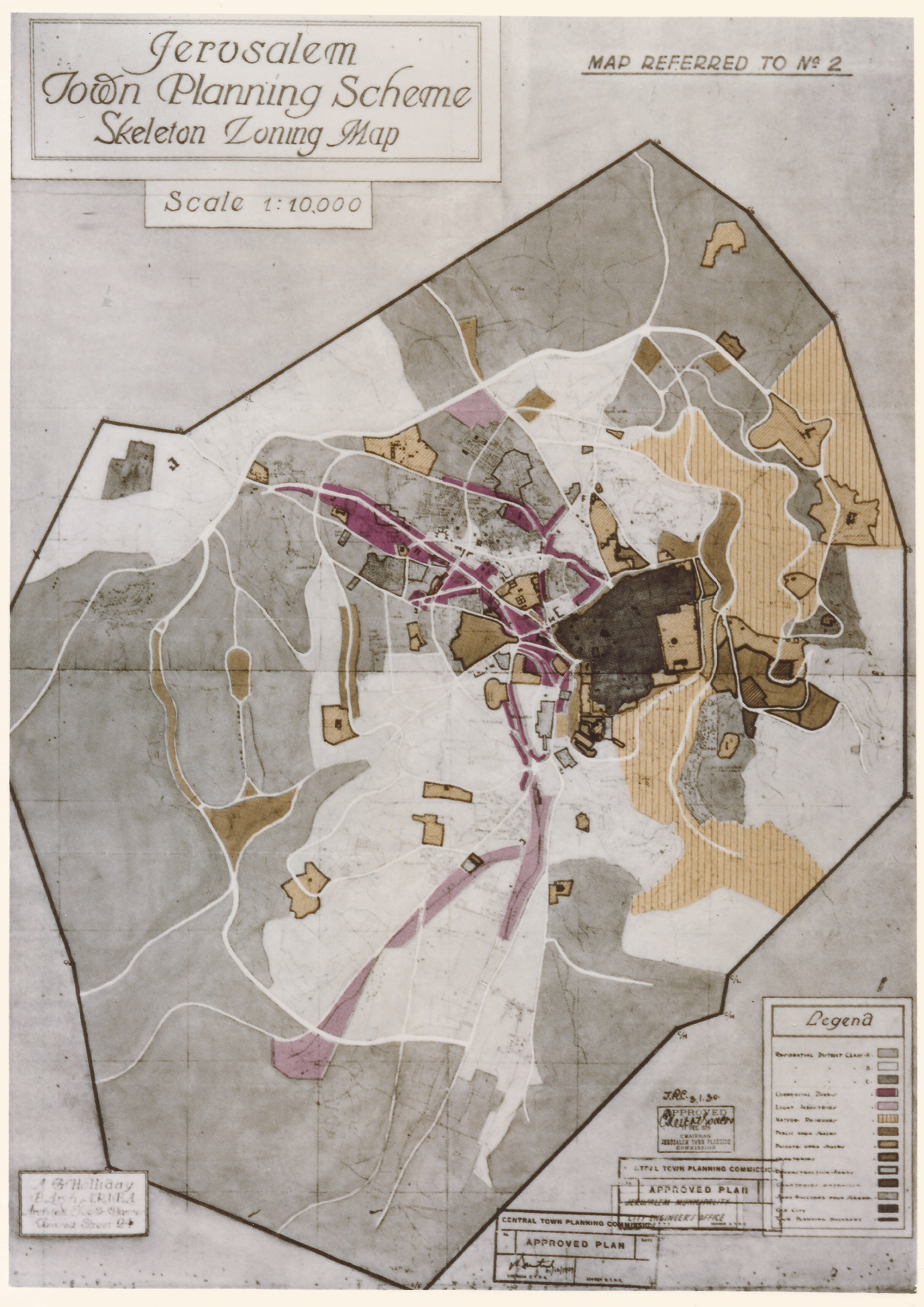
Holliday's plan for Jerusalem, 1930

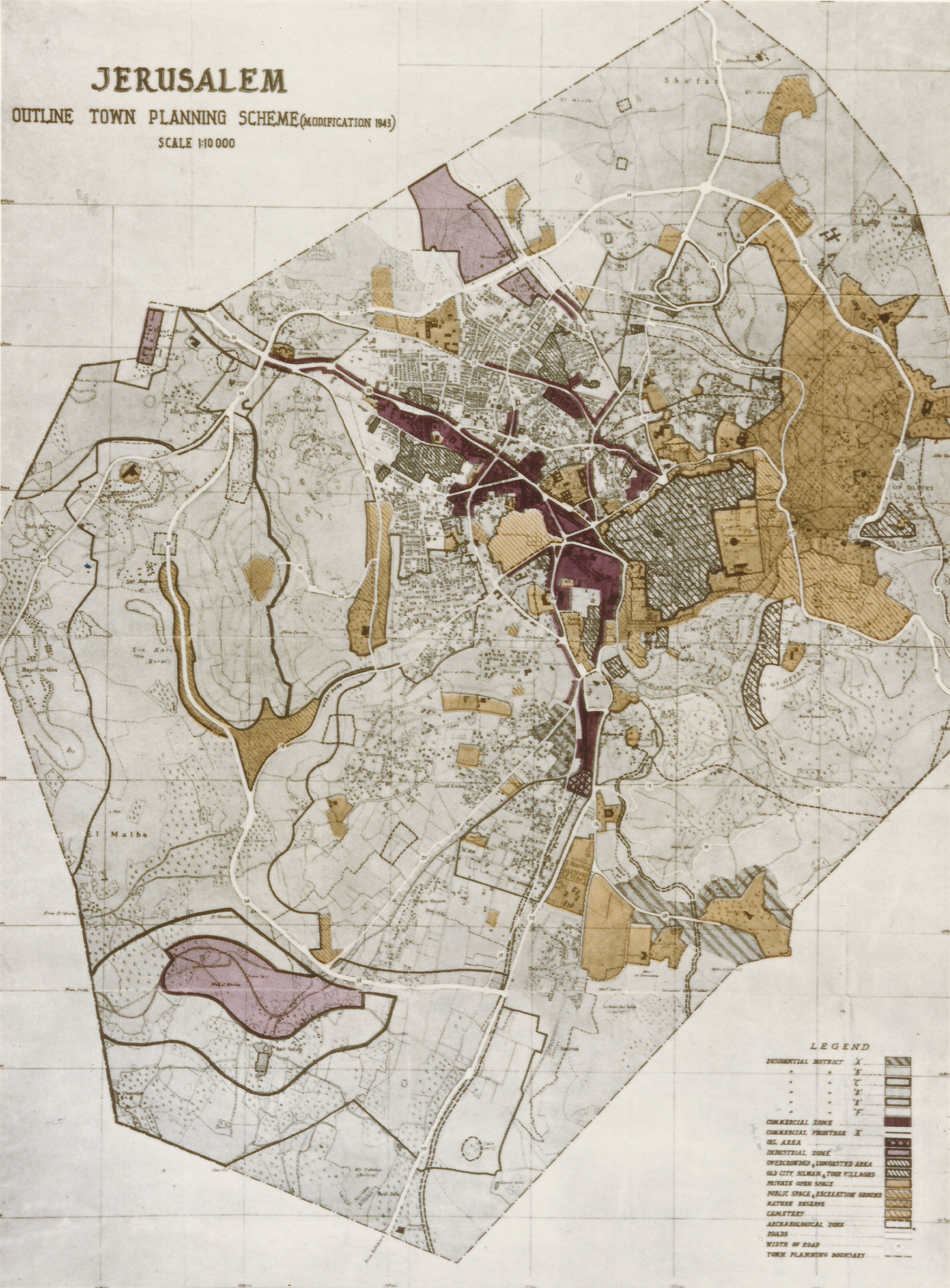
Kendall plan, 1944

== Planning of kibbutzim ==
Degania, established in 1910 near the southern tip of the Sea of Galilee, the first kibbutz was designed through the influences of socialist and utopian ideals that had evolved since the 19th century, particularly the communal philosophies associated with Marxist thought. The spatial organization centered on a shared courtyard, around which key communal buildings such as dining facilities, bathing areas, and workspaces were arranged to promote cooperation and equality among residents. As an agricultural community, functional structures like the grain silo and water tower served both practical and symbolic roles. Public institutions, including a school designed by Richard Kauffmann, reflected the kibbutz's collective ethos, especially in its approach to education and childcare. Degania's layout and philosophy set a precedent for future kibbutzim.

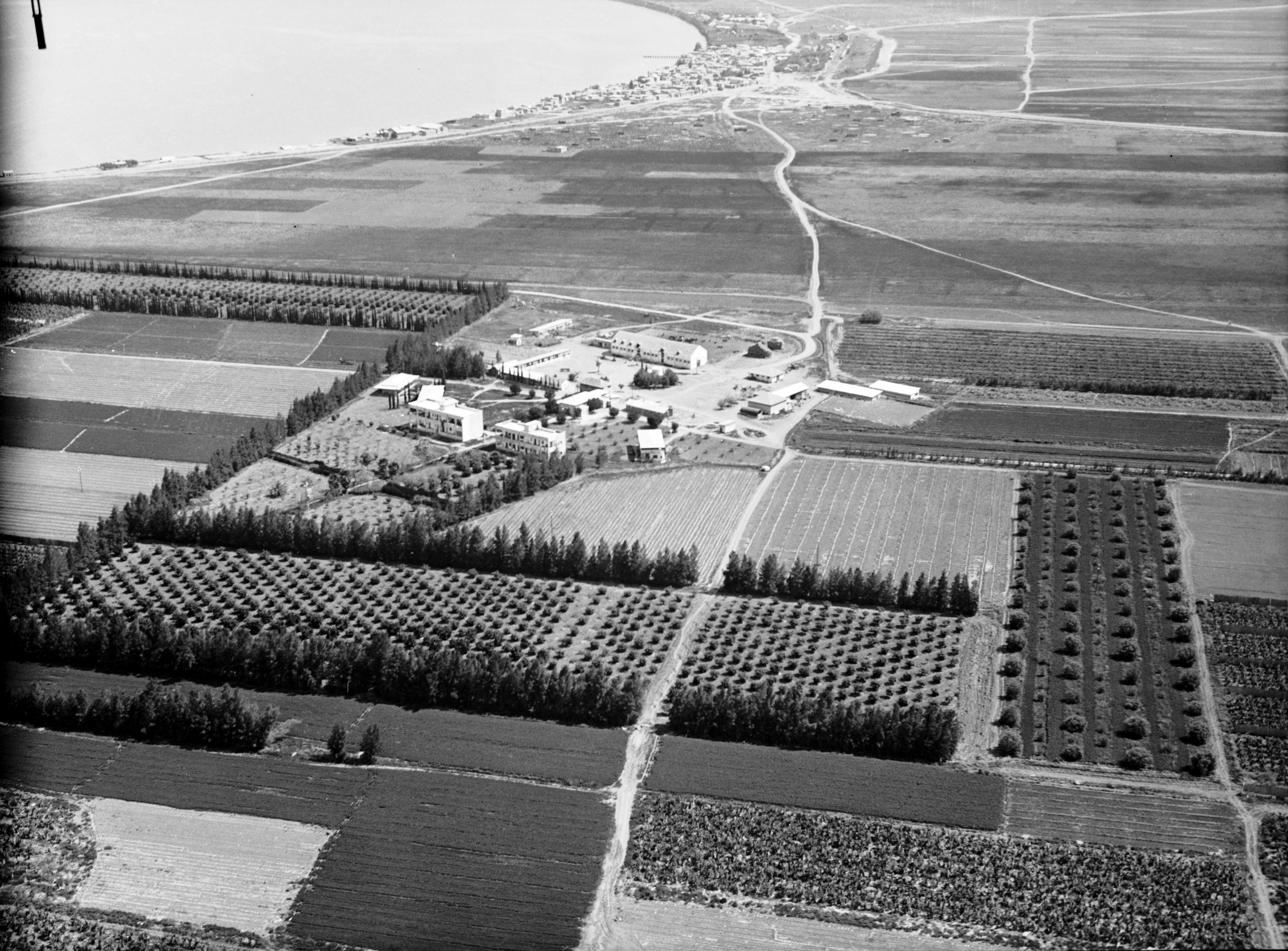
Degania, 1931

Nahalal, established in 1921 in Israel's Jezreel Valley, was planned by architect Richard Kauffmann, the kibbutz was designed in a circular formation, placing shared public buildings such as the school and community centers at its core. Around this center, residential homes were arranged in a ring, while agricultural lands extended outward in evenly spaced sectors for each family. This design was intended to optimize land distribution and farming efficiency and foster a sense of communal life and egalitarianism.

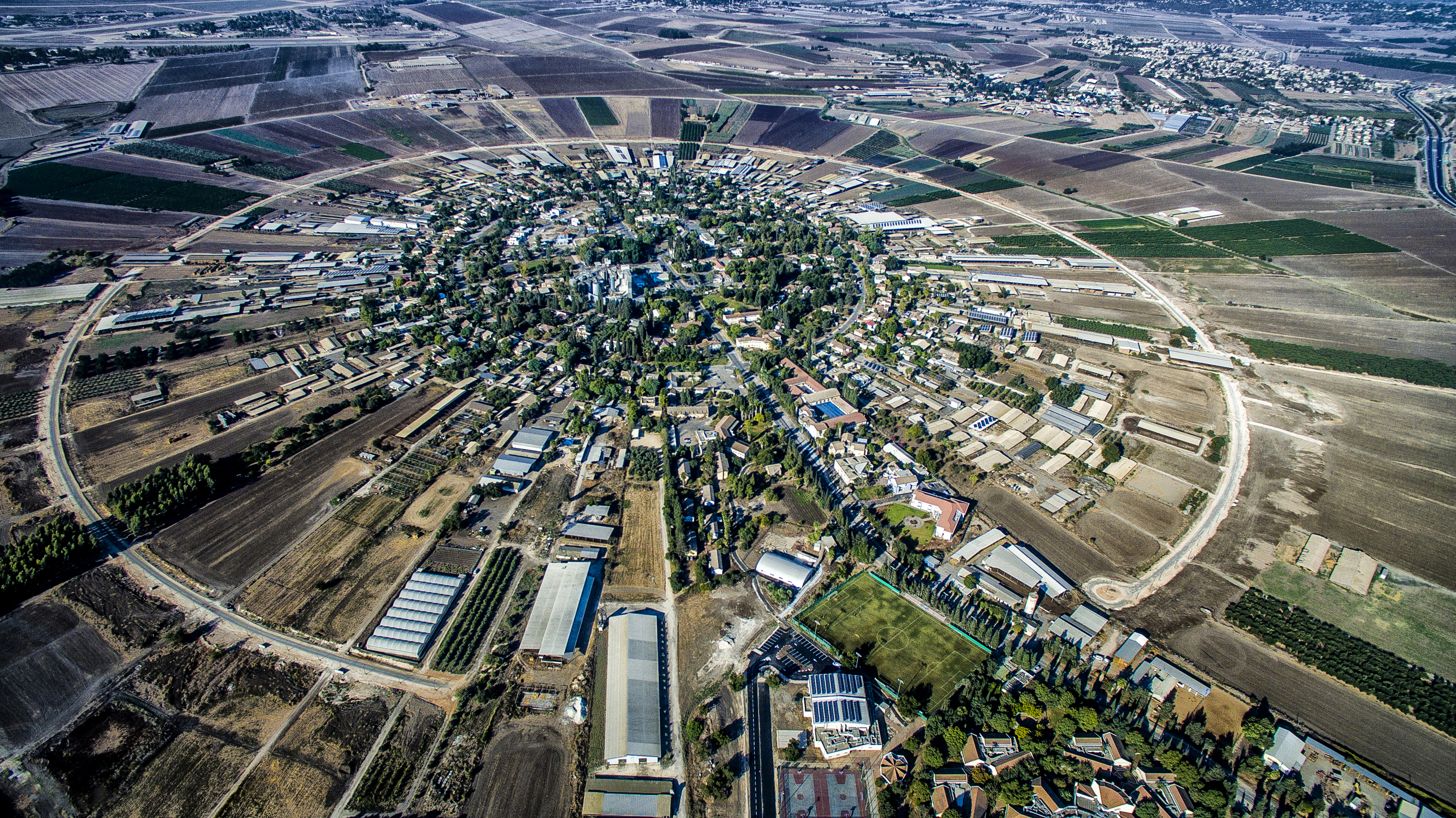
Nahalal

== Planning of development towns ==
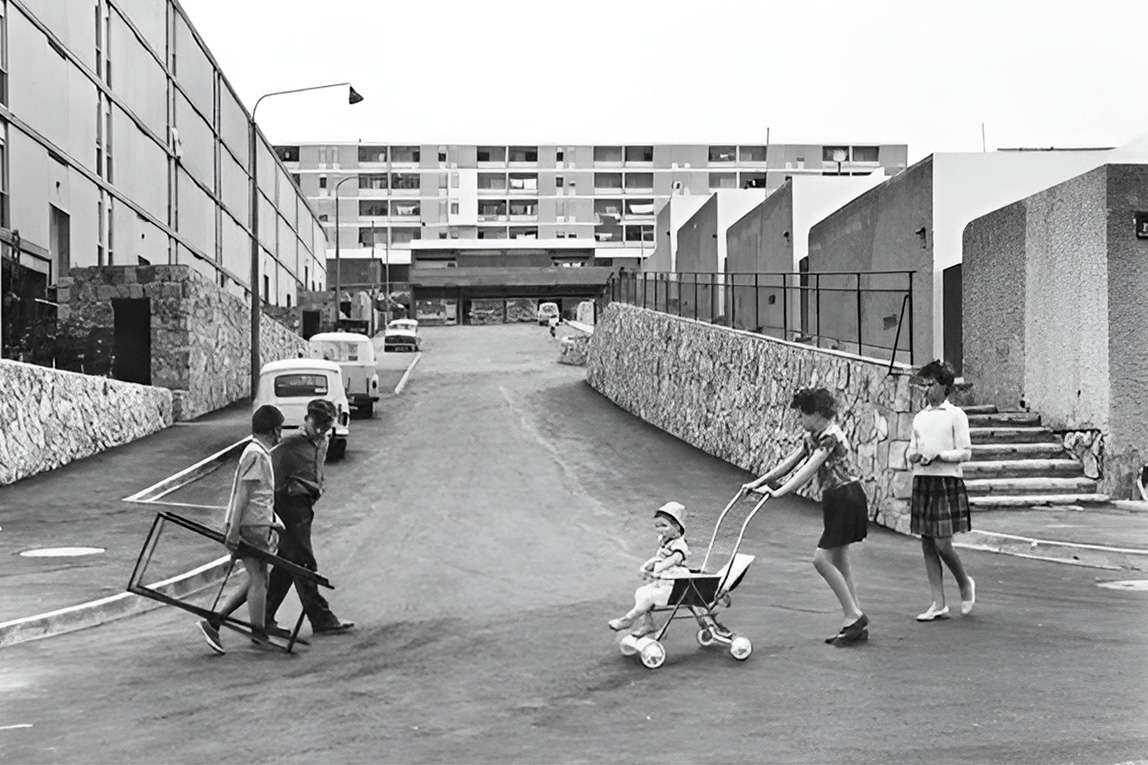
Karmiel, a development town in northern Israel

During the early years of statehood, Israel established numerous development towns in peripheral regions such as the Negev Desert in the south and the Galilee in the north. These locations were chosen both for their strategic importance and for the state's goal of dispersing the population beyond the dominant urban centers of Tel Aviv, Jerusalem, and Haifa. The towns were intended to form a network of small to mid-sized cities, each serving as a regional hub. Urban planners envisioned communities of roughly 20,000 to 50,000 residents, designed to offer essential services and employment opportunities to surrounding rural settlements. Their physical layout generally included designated zones for housing, industry, and public amenities such as schools, clinics, and municipal offices with an emphasis on promoting self-sufficiency and regional economic integration.

Despite these ambitions, the development towns faced numerous planning and socio-economic challenges. Most were built quickly under tight budgets, leading to simple, utilitarian architecture and insufficient infrastructure. The majority of residents were Mizrahi Jews, arriving from North Africa and the Middle East, alongside smaller populations of Holocaust survivors and later, immigrants from the former Soviet Union. Economically, the towns were meant to attract investment through government incentives this was largely unsuccessful. Arad achieved relative prosperity. The planning process was largely top-down, headed by Arieh Sharon's development office under the Prime Minister's Office. As a result, many towns suffered from poor housing quality, limited job opportunities, and a lack of integration, reinforcing their association with social and economic marginalization.

== See also ==
- Architecture of Israel
