= Henry Kendall (urban planner) =

British urban planner

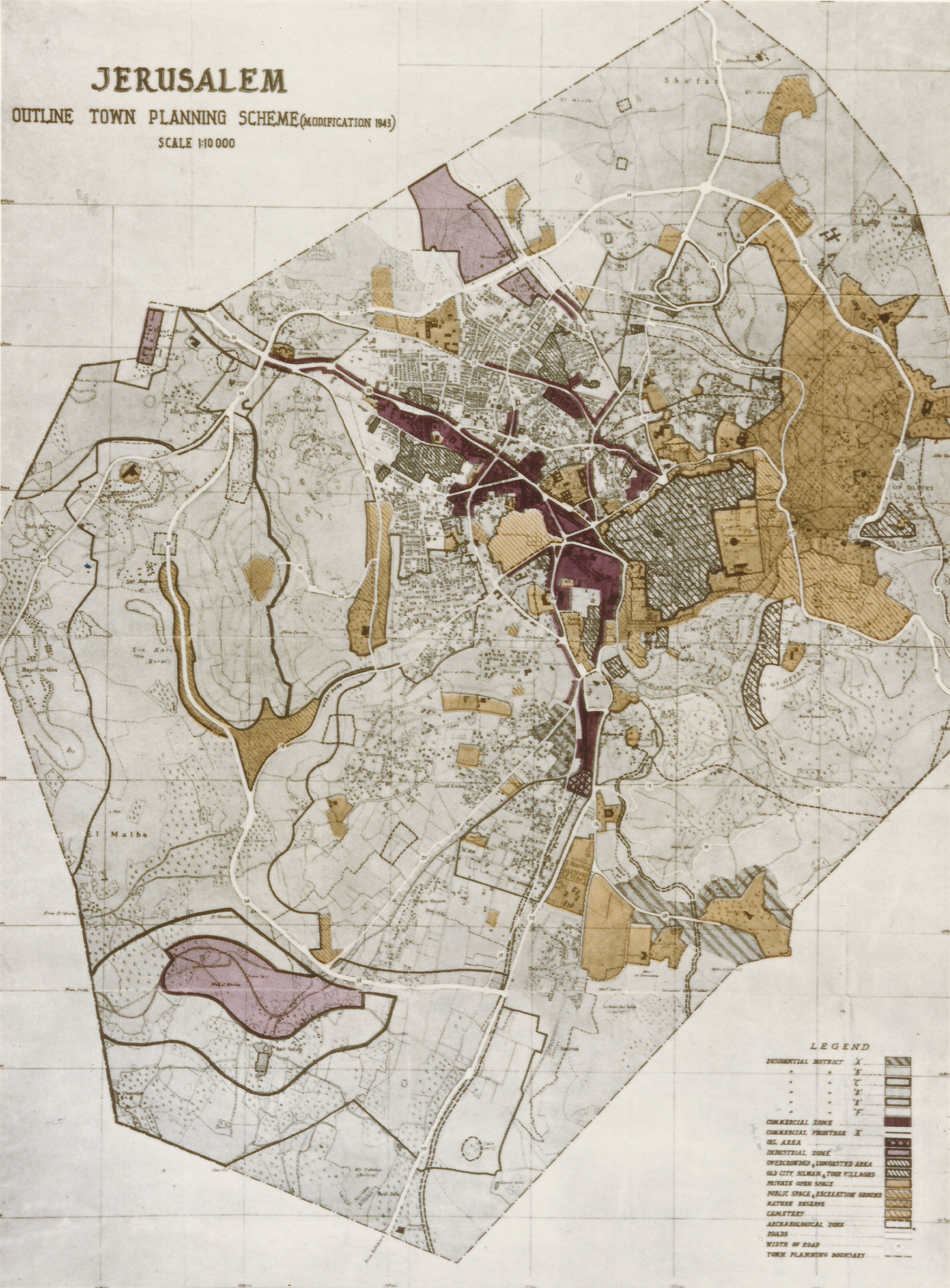
Henry Kendall plan for Jerusalem 1944

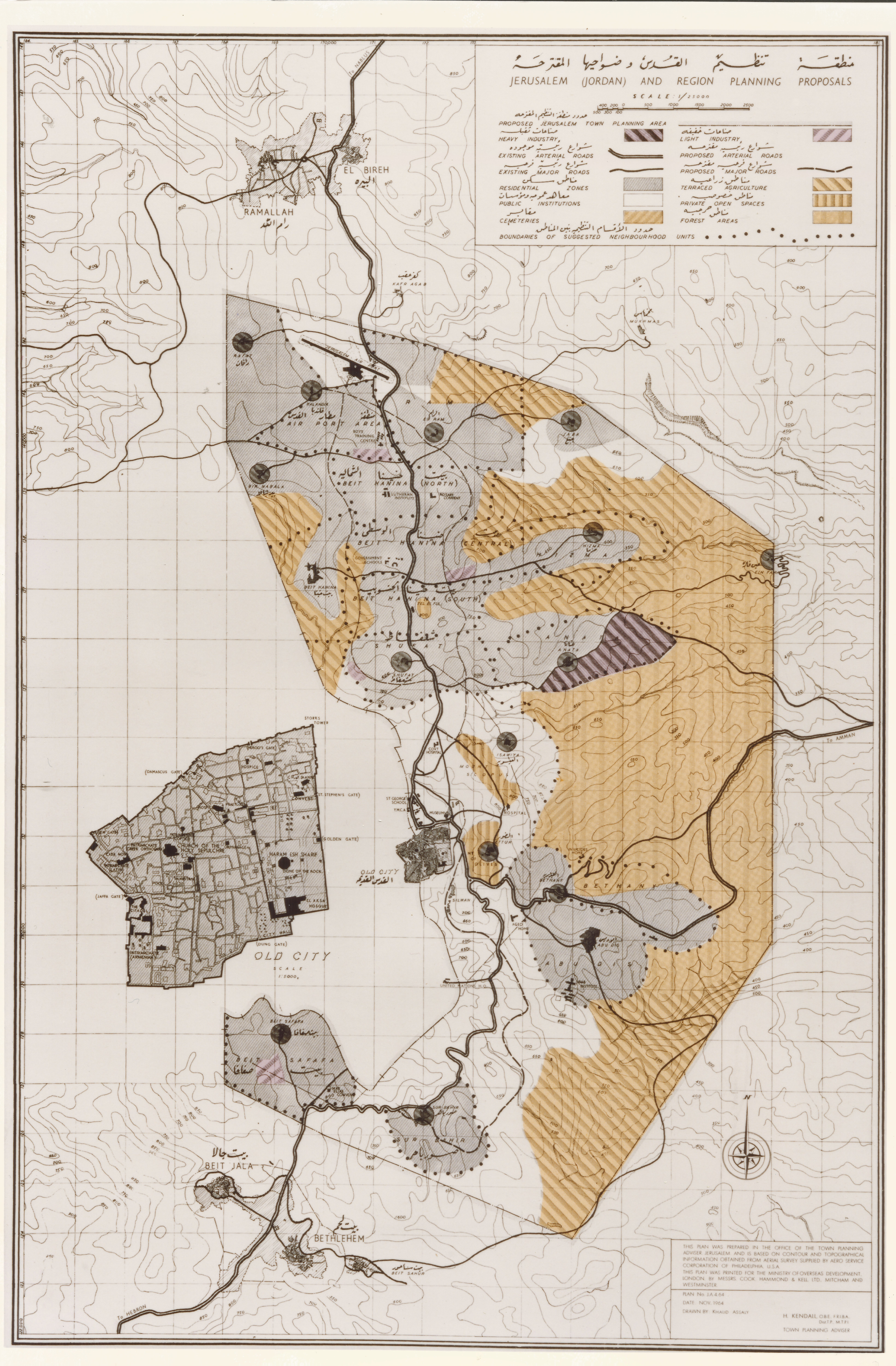
Henry Kendall plan for East Jerusalem 1964

Henry Kendall (1903–1983) was a British architect, who worked as an urban planner, in British colonies and former colonies.

== Education ==
Between 1922 and 1927, Kendall studied architecture in the University of London. In 1928 he had a practicum in urban planning.

== Urban planning career ==
Kendall's first appointment outside the British islands was in 1929, as an urban planner, for the office of colonies in Malaysia. He worked there until 1932. In 1935, he worked in England.

=== British Mandatory Palestine ===
Kendall worked for Mandatory Palestine from 1936 until the end of the British mandate in 1948. During this era, he was the High Commissioner of Palestine's adviser for urban planning the manager of the Mandatory Palestine transportation Public Works Department and the City Architect of Jerusalem. Kendall wrote two of his books about his projects of this era.

His work for British Mandatory Palestine included the zoning plan of the following cities:

- Jerusalem – in 1944, Kendall's zoning plan for Jerusalem replaced former plans. Like the former ones, it forbade tall buildings, and announced dimension stone as mandatory. It forbade building too close to the outer side of the Walls of Jerusalem, and announced the area around the wall as a park. It also announced the Mount of Olives as a nature reserve. Twenty years later, in 1964, Kendall and Brown submitted an advance zoning program, with the same principles, for East Jerusalem, while they were working for the Jordanian Kingdom
- Beersheba – in 1937, Kendall's zoning plan for Beersheba replaced former British zoning plans for it, which were not applicable. By Kendall's planning, the British kept building Beersheba in the modern way that the Turkish Empire started. It was a grid street plan, in which the main avenue was the commercial and municipal center. The Israelis changed that zoning plan in 1952.
- Tel Aviv
- Tiberias
- Gaza City - Only in 1937, British Mandatory authorities began a major effort of rebuilding the city, which had been ruined in World War I. According to Kendall's zoning, only a small part of the city got a historic preservation, Omar Mukhtar Street became a main street, and new neighborhoods were established in a new form.
- Nablus
- Jaffa – Jaffa's city hall (which was not yet a part of Tel Aviv) rejected Kendall's zoning plan, preferring a plan of an Arab architect from Cairo.

=== Uganda, Zanzibar and Ghana ===
Between 1948 and 1956, Kendall worked as the chief urban planner for the British colonial regime of Uganda. There he planned the zoning of Kampala and wrote another book. His zoning plan of Kampala replaced a former one, by a German architect.

In 1957–8, Kendall worked in Zanzibar. There he planned the zoning of Stone Town, with the architect, Geoffrey Mill. The plan was used only partially.

Between 1958 and 1962, he worked for the government of Ghana.

=== Jordan, Gibraltar and England ===
Between 1963 and 1966, Kendall worked for the Jordanian Kingdom – an ex-British colony, that included only areas formerly been in the British Mandatory Palestine. The Jordanians hired Kendall in order to fit his old zoning plan of Jerusalem to the situation in which Jerusalem is divided between two states.

Between 1967 and 1977, Kendall worked for the British government, in Gibraltar.

Between 1978 and 1983, Kendall was a member of the Committee for Historic preservation of the English Countryside. In the last two of those years, he was the committee's chairman.

== Legacy ==
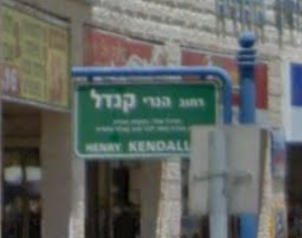
Henry Kendall Street sign, Beersheba, Israel.

In Beersheba, a street is named after Henry Kendall. The street provides access to the Rambam Square towers and the Beersheba Turkish railway station.

== Books written ==
- Jerusalem The City Plan, 1918-1948 (His Majesty's Stationery Office, 1948)
- Kendall Henery, Village Development in Palestine During the British Mandate (Crown Agents for the Colonies, 1949)
- Town planning in Uganda; a brief description of the efforts made by the government to control the development of urban areas from 1915 to 1955 (Crown Agents for Overseas Governments and Administrations, 1955)

== See also ==
- Urban planning in Israel
