= New North, Tel Aviv =

Neighborhood of Tel Aviv, Israel

New North הצפון החדש
- Neighborhood
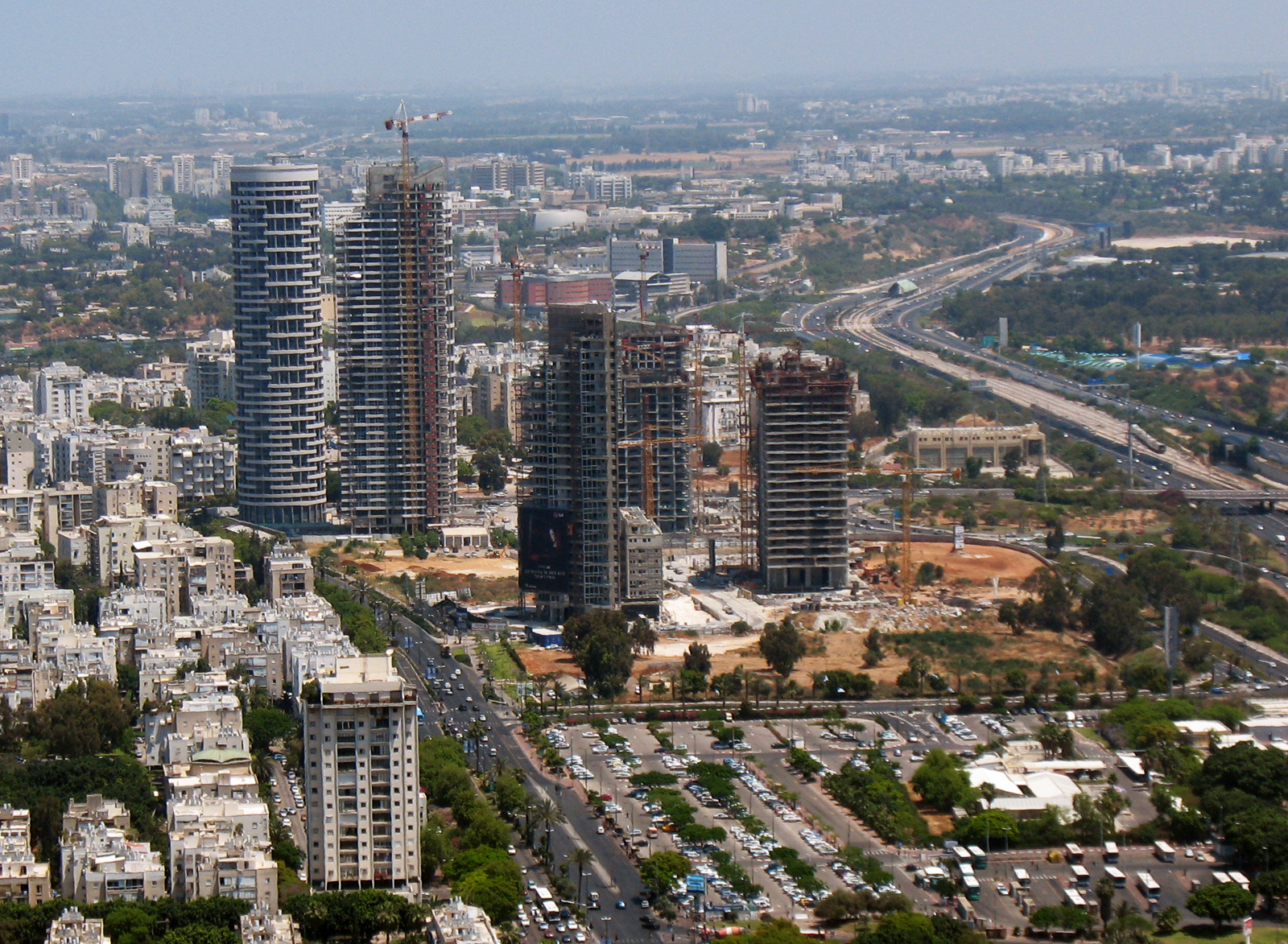
- Park Tzameret area in the neighborhood
- Country: Israel
- City: Tel Aviv
- Established: 1950s

New North (Hebrew: הצפון החדש, romanized: HaTzafon HaHadash) is a neighborhood in Tel Aviv, which became established in the 1950s with the expansion of Tel Aviv into areas east of Ibn Gabirol Street. The development process applied principles laid out in the Geddes Plan for Tel Aviv where buildings were constructed primarily as blocks, and it also had wider streets compared to older neighborhoods to accommodate for more cars in the city.
