= Yachin House =

- בית יכין
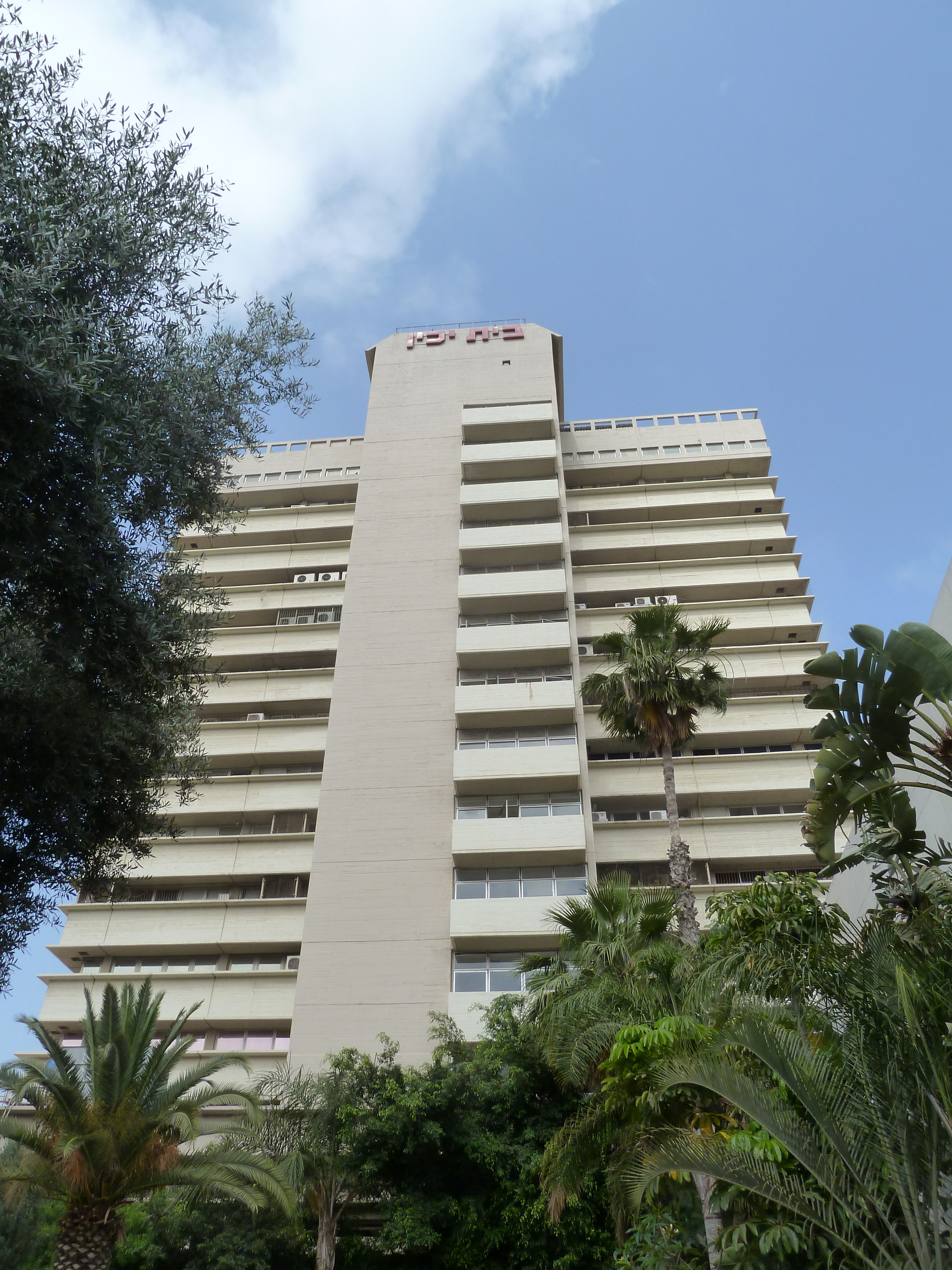
- Alternative names: Kaplan 2
- Etymology: Yakhin Group

General information
- Architectural style: Brutalism, Bauhaus
- Location: Kaplan Street 2, Tel Aviv, Israel
- Coordinates: 32.0733°N 34.7820°E
- Current tenants: Guesty, AutoDS, Embassies of Brazil and Panama, Chief Military Censor

Design and construction
- Architects: Benjamin Idelson, Arieh Sharon

Yachin House (Hebrew: בית יכין), also called Yachin Tower or Kaplan 2, is a modernist office building in central Tel Aviv, Israel. It is a significant example of brutalist architecture in Israel and is included on a preservation plan of brutalist structures. It was designed by Israeli architects Arieh Sharon and Benjamin Idelson, part of Sharon's shift in architectural practice from early modernism to brutalism. The building is at 2 Kaplan Street, at the corner of Ibn Gabirol Street. Built in 1962, it has 16 floors and was renovated in 2002–2003.

In November 2025, the Tel Aviv local planning and construction committee approved the expropriation of a land strip along the building's Kaplan Street facade, comprising approximately 533 m^{2} (5,740 sq ft) of the building's 2,600 m^{2} (28,000 sq ft) property. The purpose of this expropriation was to widen Kaplan Street and construct infrastructure for public transportation, primarily the Light Rail Green Line's Kaplan Station.
