= Kaplan Street =

Street in Tel Aviv, Israel

Coordinates: 32°4′23.17″N 34°47′11.68″E

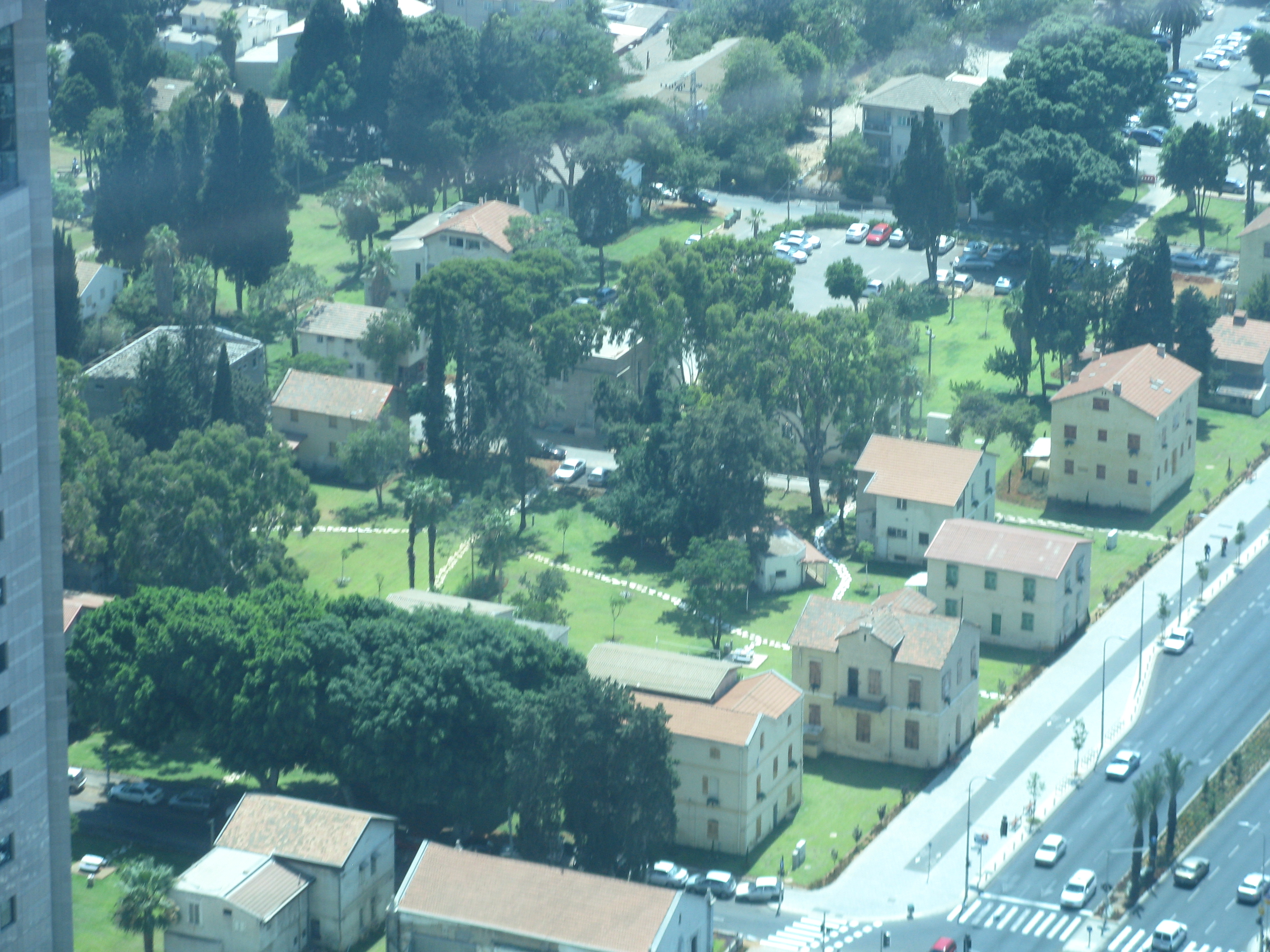
An aerial view of Sarona.

Kaplan Street is a major thoroughfare in central Tel Aviv, Israel, running from the Azrieli Center interchange on its eastern edge, to Ibn Gabirol Street on its western edge.

== History ==
Named after Eliezer Kaplan, an important Israeli politician, the street connects the city center to the Ayalon Highway, and is one of the busiest streets in the city. Right next to it, lies the old Templer neighborhood of Sarona, which has undergone a major renovation programme, in addition to the street itself, which has been widened in recent years.

The Israeli Intelligence Community had offices on this street.

Starting January 14, 2023, Kaplan Street became the site of weekly protests of Israel's proposed (and partially enacted) judicial overhaul as well as subsequent protests by the Kaplan Force.

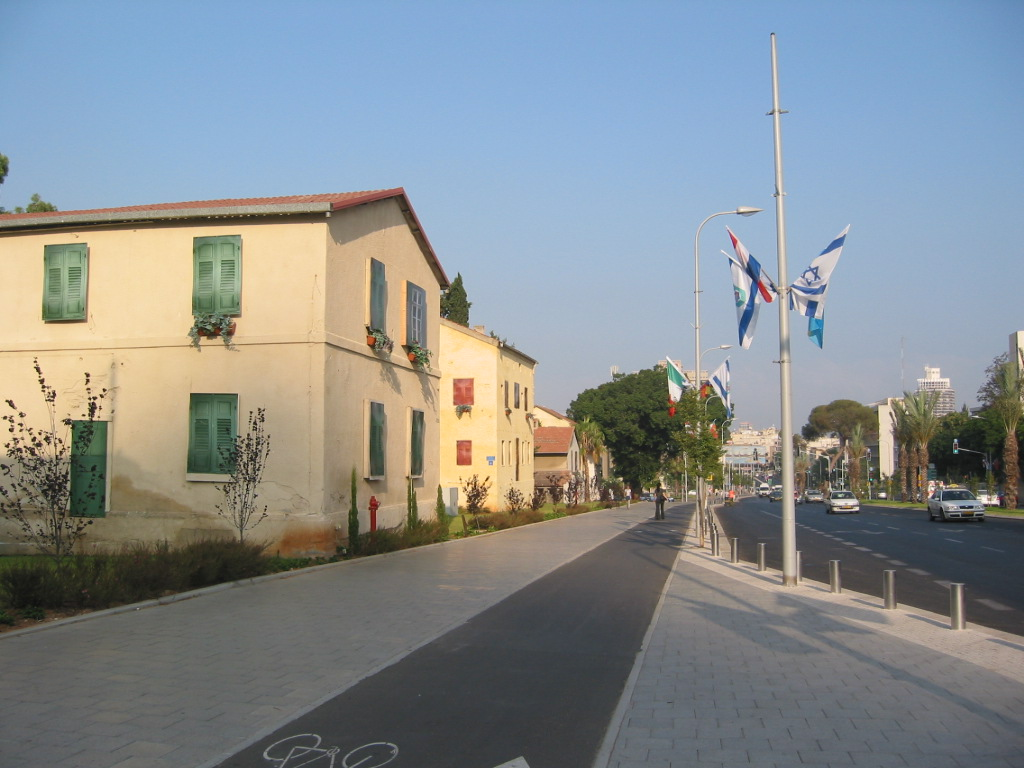

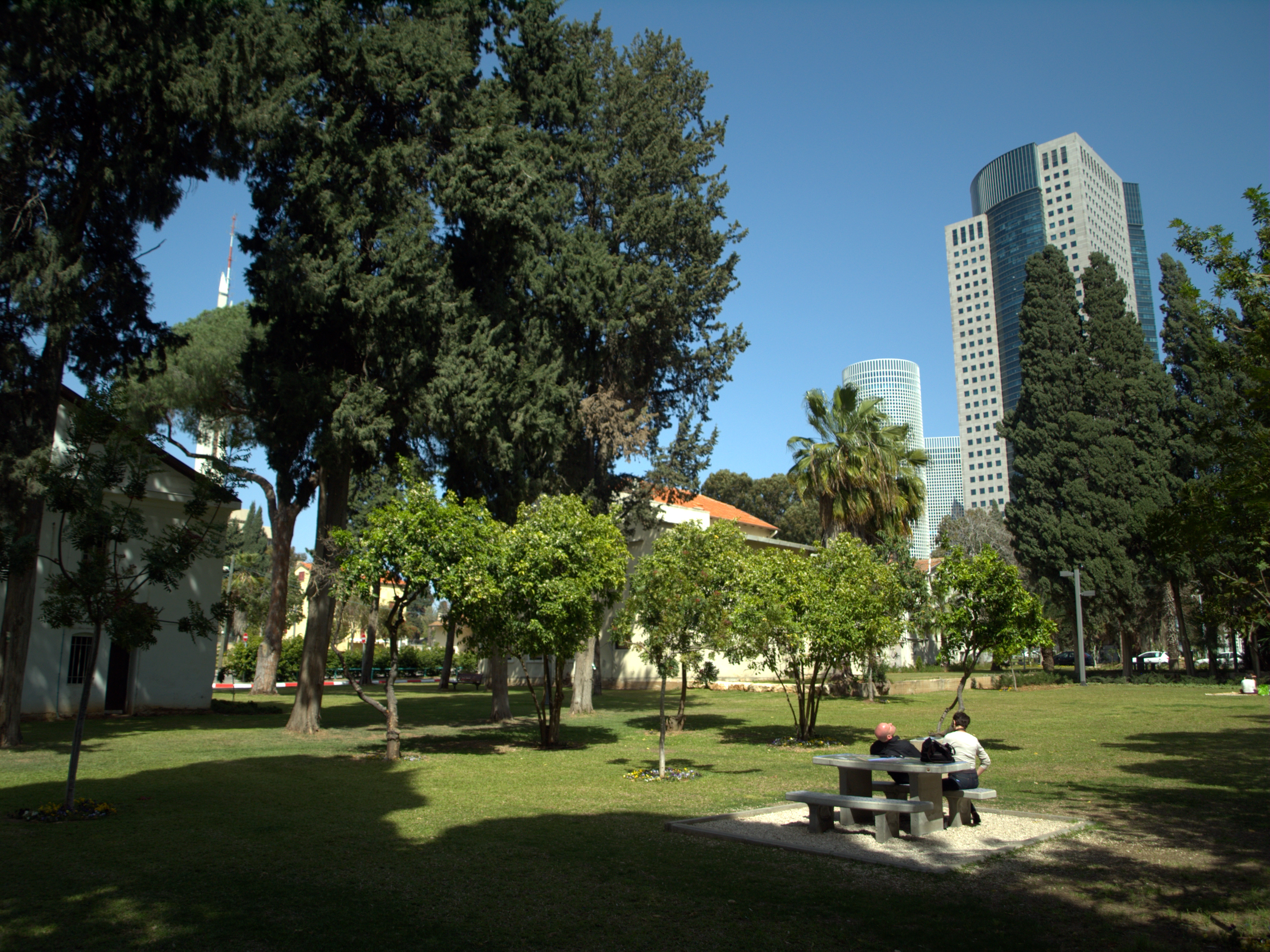
Grounds of the Templer buildings in the Sarona colony on Kaplan Street

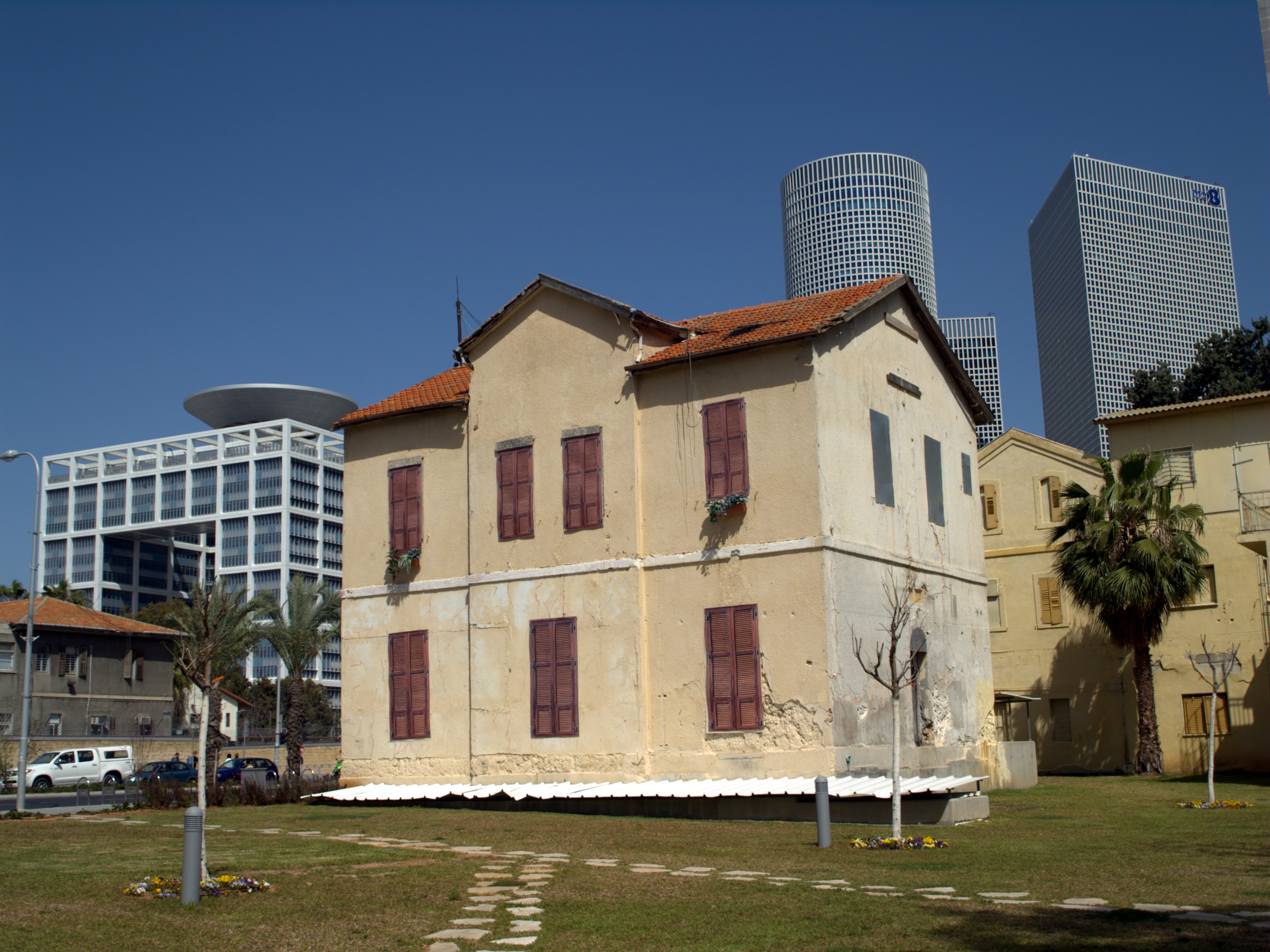
Grounds of the Templer buildings in the Sarona colony on Kaplan Street

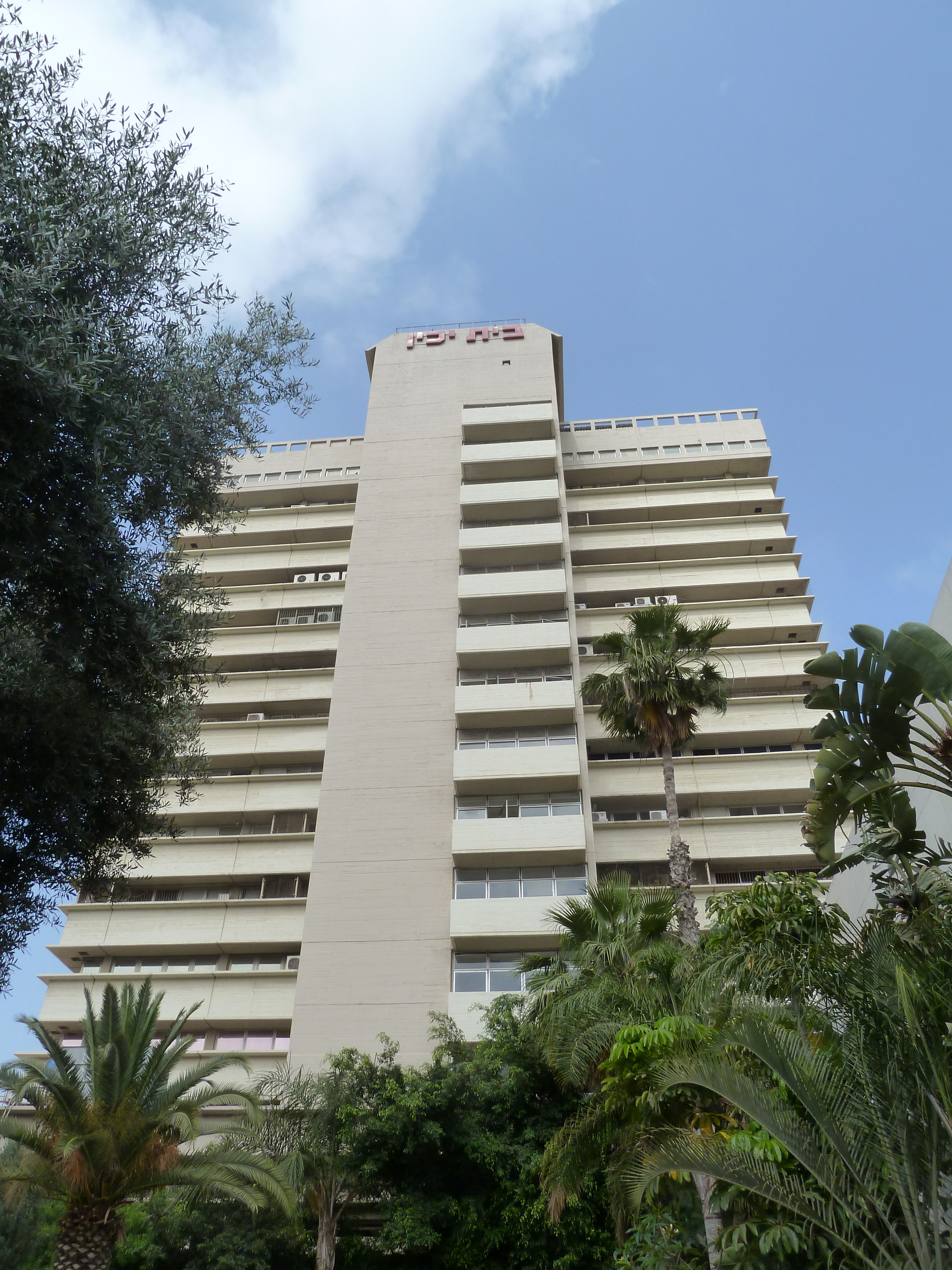
Beit Yachin (Yachin House) on Kaplan Street

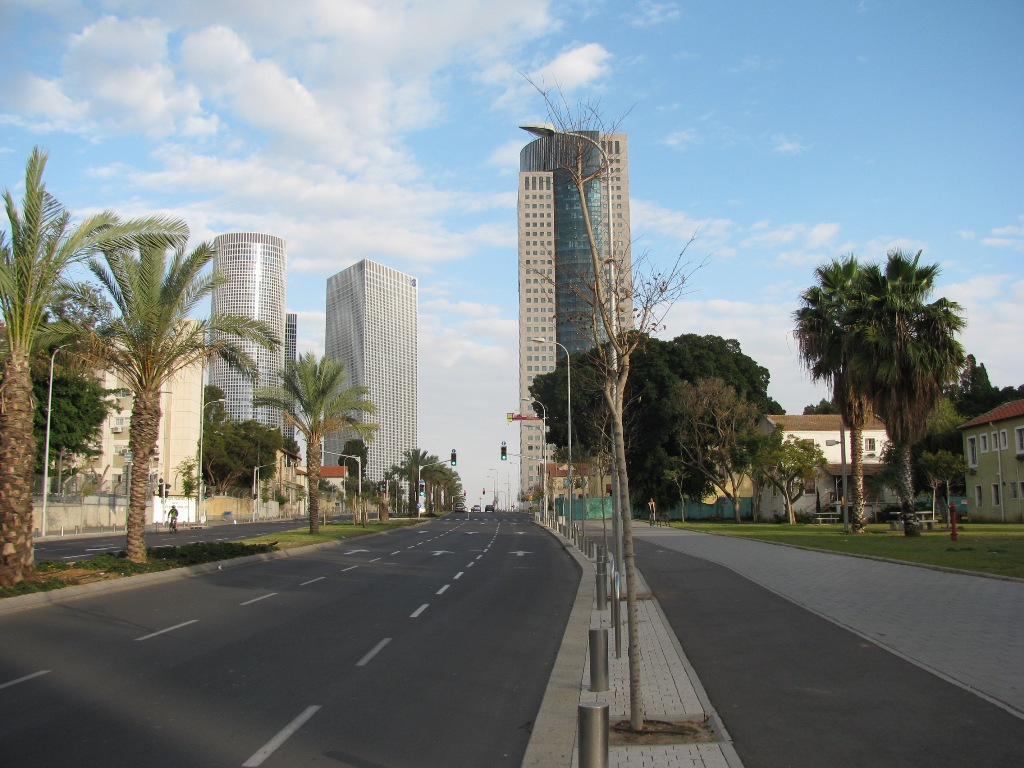
Kaplan street (renewed)

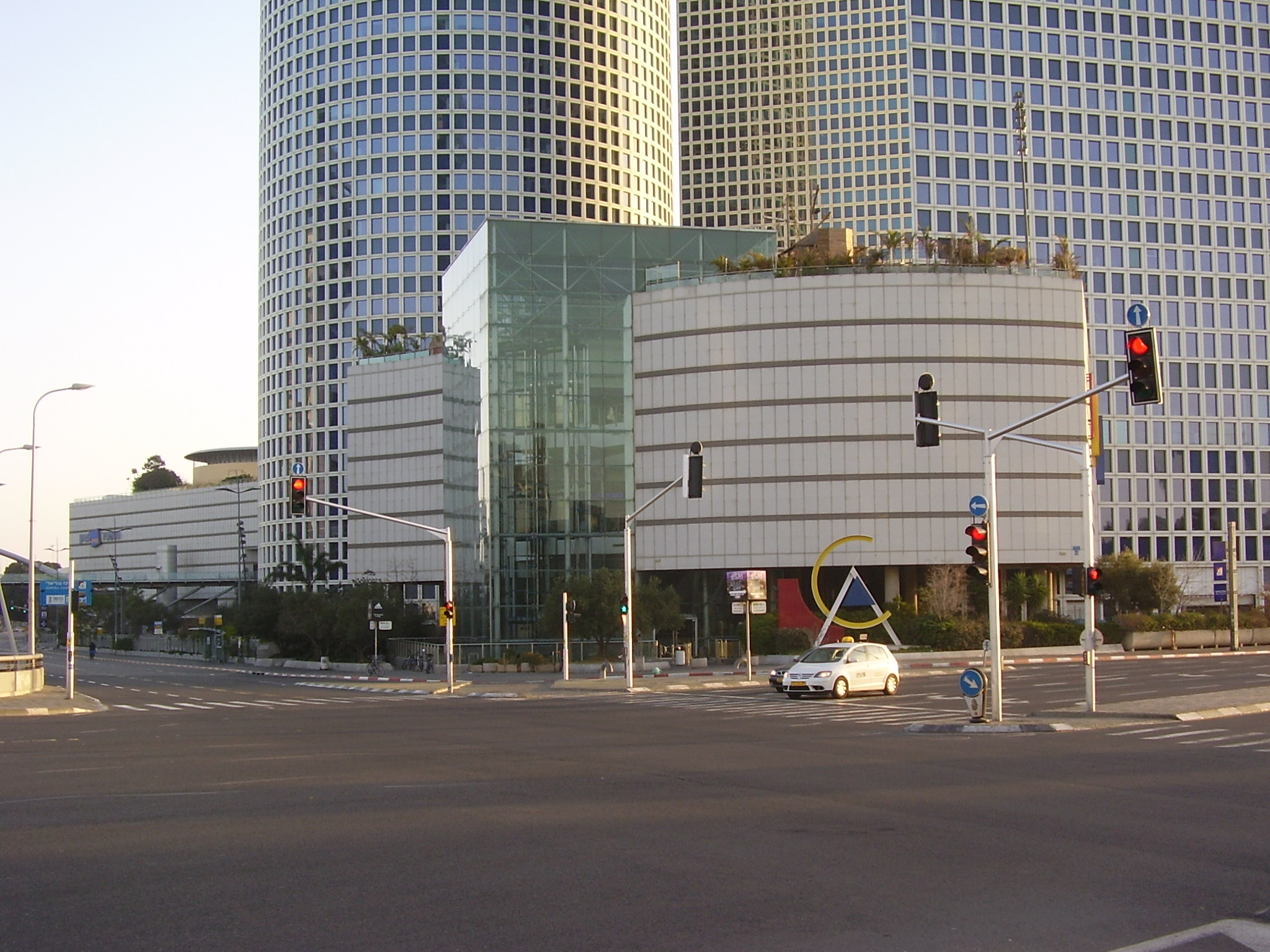
Azrieli mall

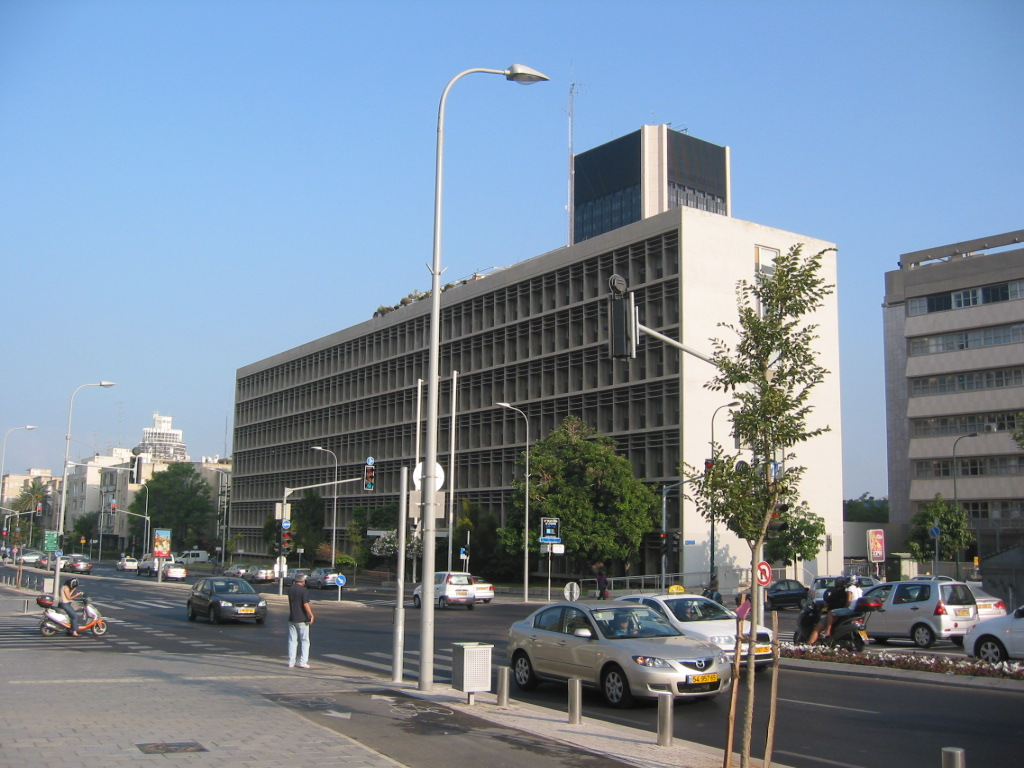
Jewish Agency for Israel Building

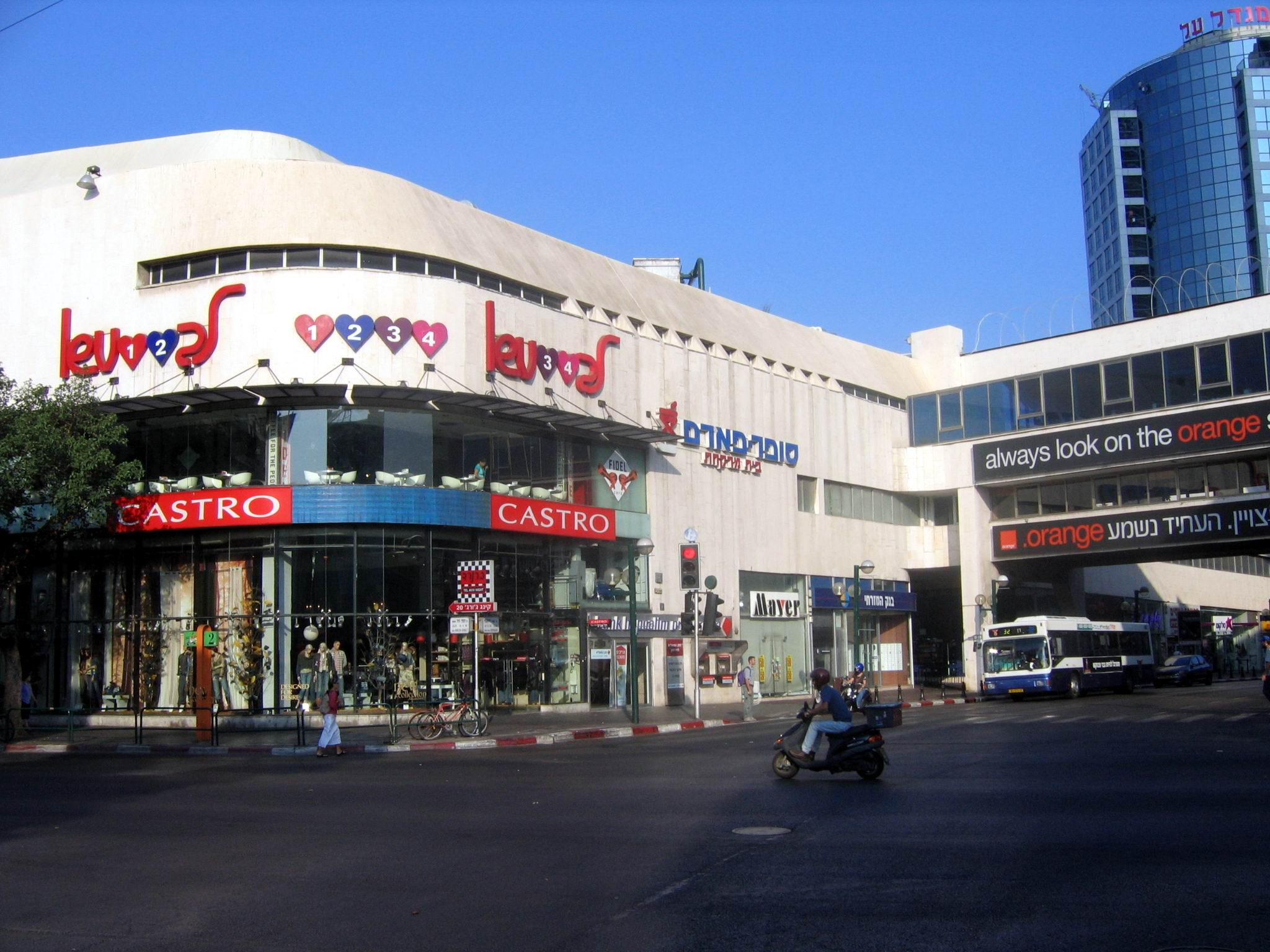
Dizengoff Center. Castro (clothing), SuperPharm and Orange (telecommunications) signs are noticeable

== See also ==
- Streets in Tel Aviv
