= Rambam Square =

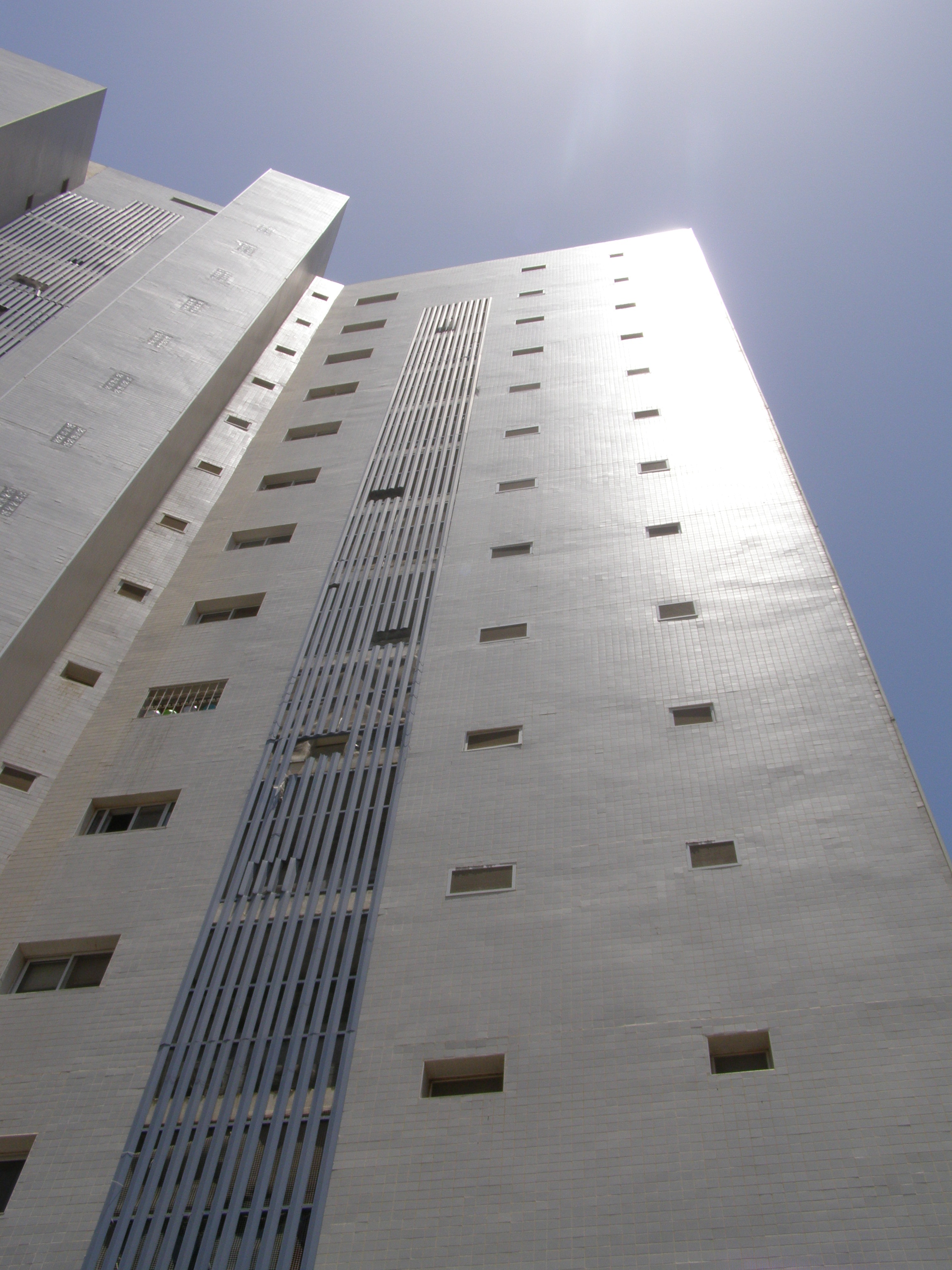
- Interactive map of the Rambam Square area

General information
- Status: Completed
- Type: Residential
- Location: Beersheba, Israel
- Coordinates: 31°14′0″N 34°47′0″E
- Opening: 1-2001; 2-2003

Height
- Roof: 1-100m 2-112m

Technical details
- Floor count: 1-26; 2-32

The Rambam Square Towers (Hebrew: כיכר רמב"ם) are a complex of two residential skyscrapers in the Israeli city of Beersheba. Rambam Square 1 was completed in 2001, and is 100 meters high, with 26 floors. It was the tallest tower in the city until the completion of Rambam Square 2 in 2003. This tower is 112 meters high with 32 floors and is the tallest residential tower outside of the Gush Dan Tel Aviv Metropolitan Area.

== See also ==
- List of skyscrapers in Israel
