= Guesty =

Property management software

- Founded: 2013
- Founders: Amiad and Koby Soto
- Headquarters: Tel Aviv, Israel
- Key people: Amiad Soto (CEO); Vered Raviv Schwarz (President & COO)
- Services: property management software
- Website: www.guesty.com

Guesty is a property management software. It is used by property managers to manage short-term rentals listed on multiple platforms such as Airbnb, Vrbo, and Booking.com.

== History ==
Guesty was founded in 2013 under the name SuperHost by twin brothers Amiad and Koby Soto. The idea came from renting out their properties on Airbnb and spending large amounts of time dealing with guest-related issues.

The company was rebranded to Guesty in 2014 and launched as a service for homeowners to get their properties ready for listing on Airbnb, including help with subsequent maintenance such as cleaning and laundry. It transitioned into a software service to help property managers deal with issues such as guest communication and task management.

The company is a Y Combinator graduate. In 2021, it acquired MyVR and Your Porter App, both property management software companies, and has raised a total of $110 million in funding from investors such as Apax Digital Fund, Viola Growth, Buran VC, Magma Venture Partners, TLV Partners and Vertex Ventures Israel.

== Product overview ==
Guesty describes itself as an end-to-end platform for property managers and property management companies. It provides cloud-based tools that help with things like tracking guest check-ins and revenue of each property. It integrates with short term rental websites such as Airbnb, Booking.com, and Vrbo to manage all a host's properties on a single platform. The company generates revenue by charging a percentage of the booking fee received from each property, or charges users a fixed fee per property each month.
