= Ibn Gabirol Street =

Street in Tel Aviv, Israel

Coordinates: 32°4′58.45″N 34°46′52.52″E

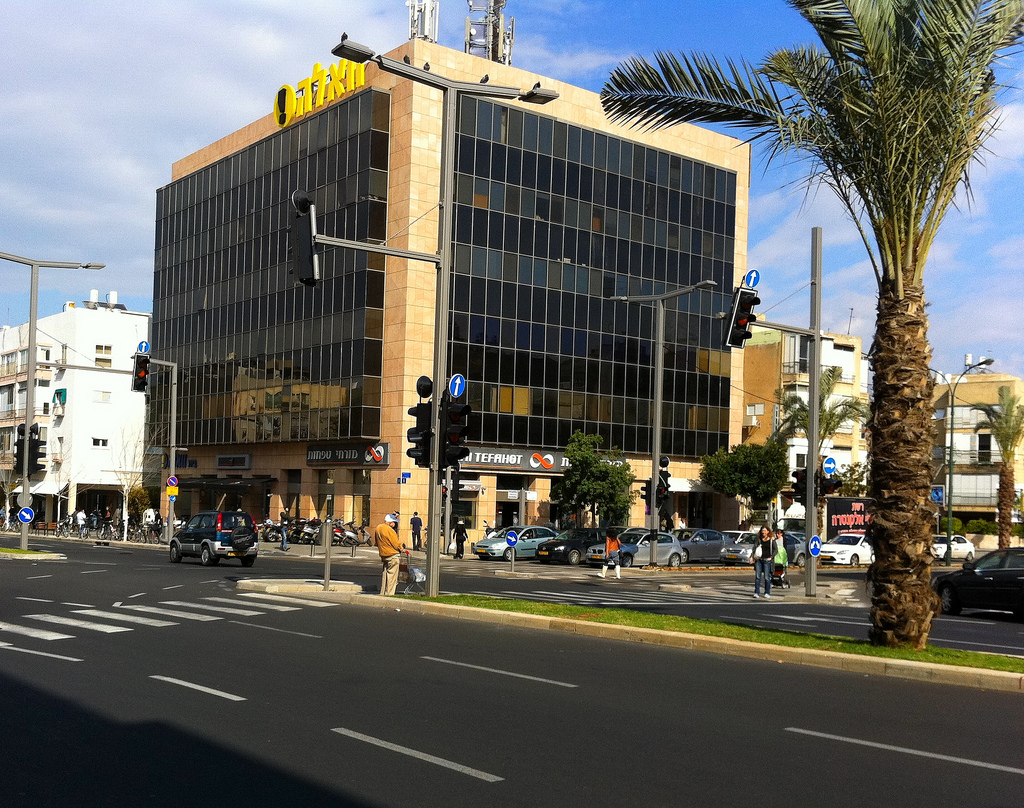
Ibn Gabirol Street

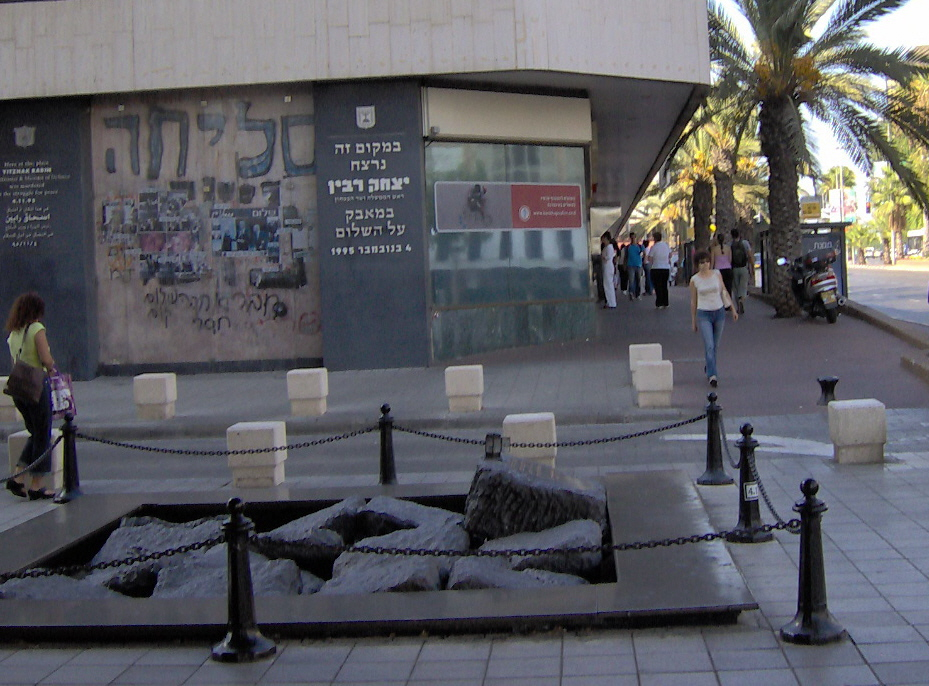
A monument at the site of the Yitzhak Rabin assassination, located on the street

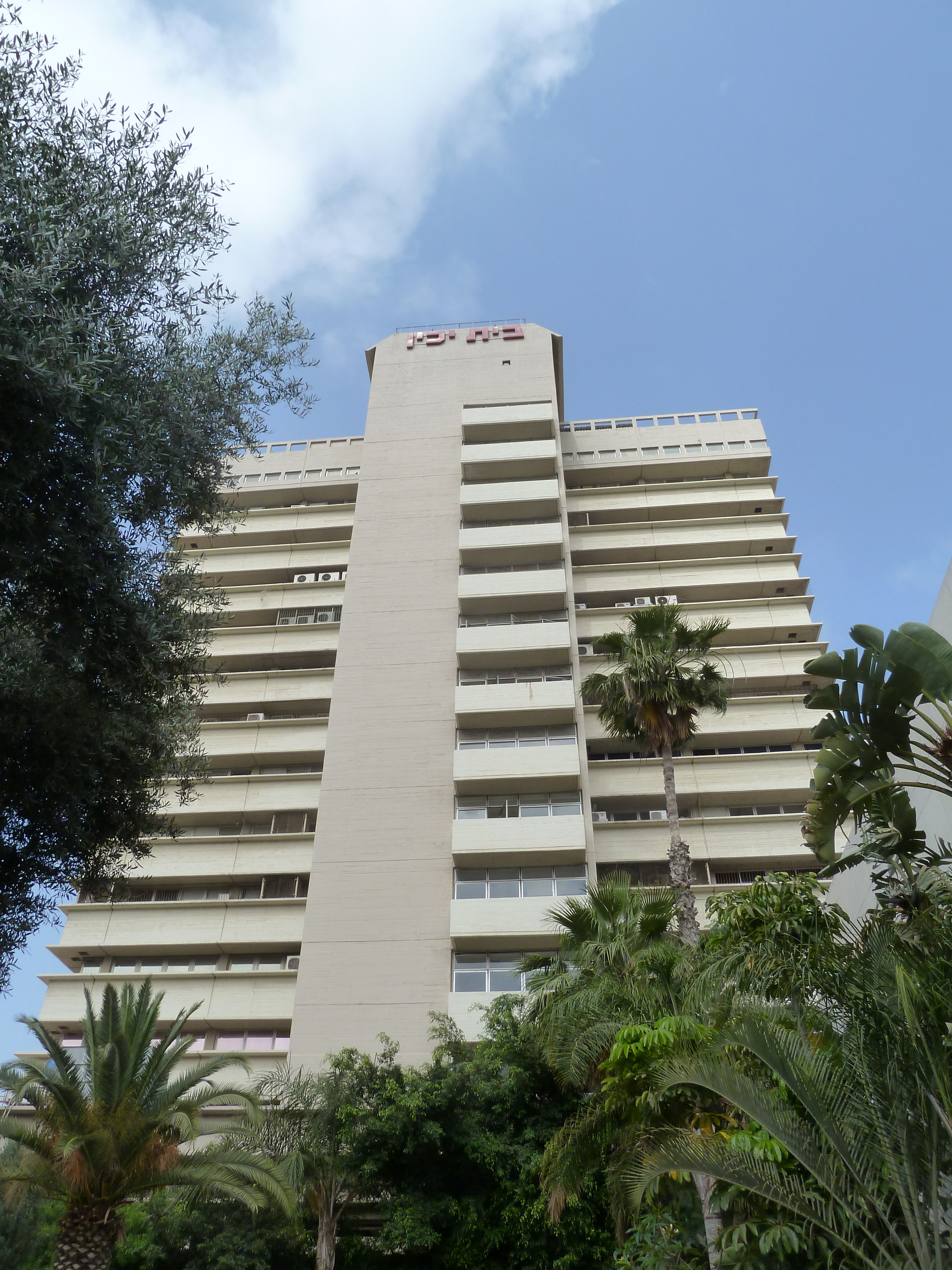
Beit Yachin (Yachin House) at the junction with Kaplan Street

Ibn Gabirol Street (Hebrew: רְחוֹב אִבְּן גַבִּירוֹל) (colloquially Ibn Gvirol or Even Gvirol) is a major street in Tel Aviv, Israel.

Ibn Gabirol Street is named after the medieval Hebrew poet and philosopher Solomon ibn Gabirol. It carries traffic north and south, and is a busy residential and shopping street. It intersects Marmorek, Laskov, Carlebach and fellow medieval Spaniard Yehuda HaLevi streets on the south, and runs northbound along Rabin Square and Yarkon Park to Basel Street and Shmuel Yosef Agnon Street in the north. The street is also home to Tel Aviv City Hall.

Ibn Gabirol Street is a commercial thoroughfare with special appeal to chocolate lovers. Two chocolatiers make fresh chocolates on the premises and three shops import Belgian chocolates which are flown into Israel every two weeks under carefully controlled conditions.

The unpaved road which was to become Ibn Gabirol Street had already existed in early 20th century, connecting Jaffa with the village of Al-Mas'udiyya, also known as Summeil. The village, located at the eastern end of Arlosoroff Street, became depopulated on 25 December 1947, when the 1947–1948 civil war in Mandatory Palestine broke out. Since then and until 12 September 1962, the village houses had been used by Jewish squatters, mainly new olim. In 1962, what had remained of the village was demolished in order to widen Arlosoroff and Ibn Gabirol streets.

The road to Summeil was the eastern boundary of the Geddes Plan for Tel Aviv, and nowadays Ibn Gabirol Street forms the eastern boundary of the White City (Tel Aviv).
