= Transport in Tel Aviv =

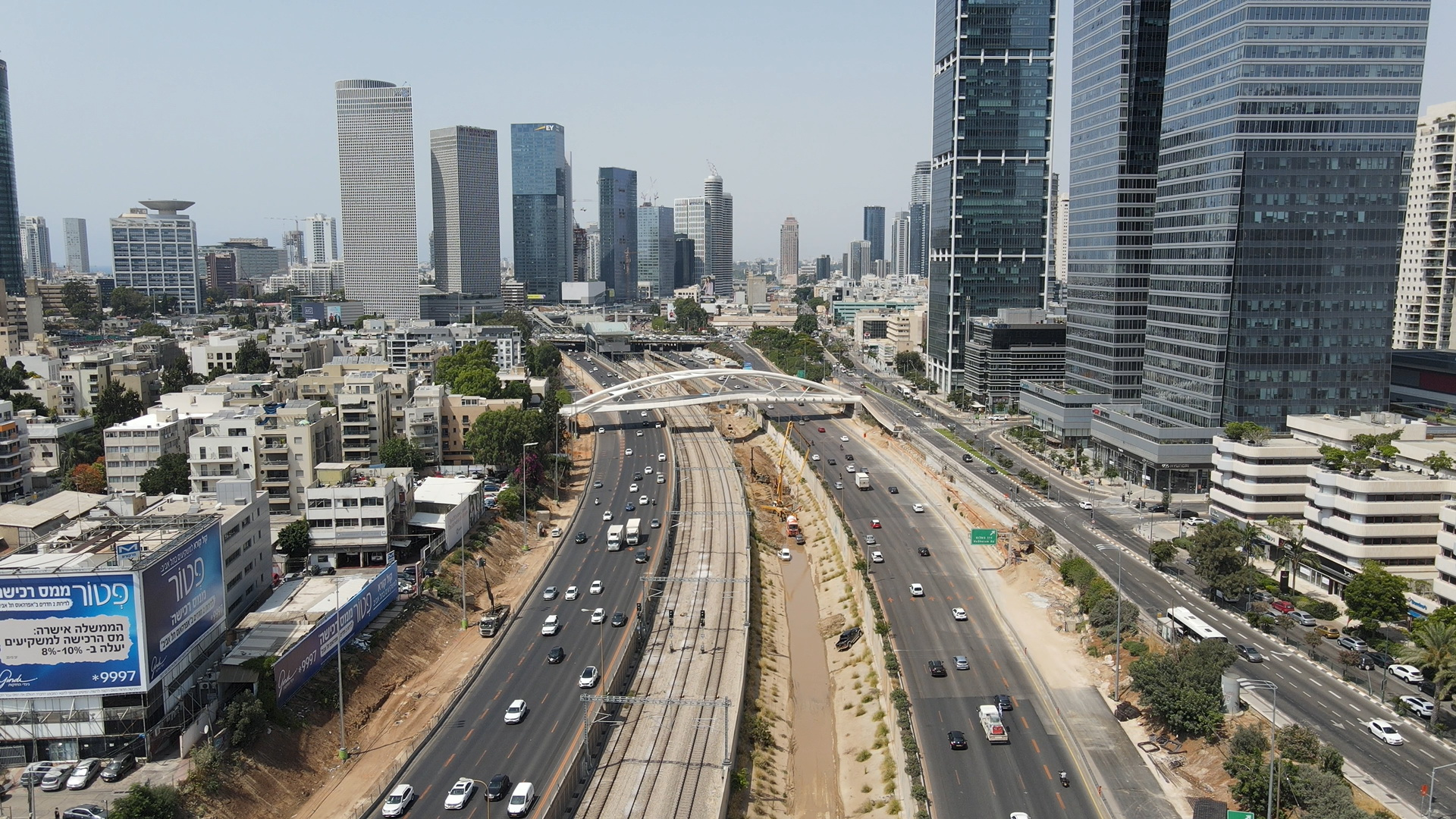
Yehudit Bridge carries pedestrians and the Field Route of the Ofnidan Cycle Network over the Ayalon Highway

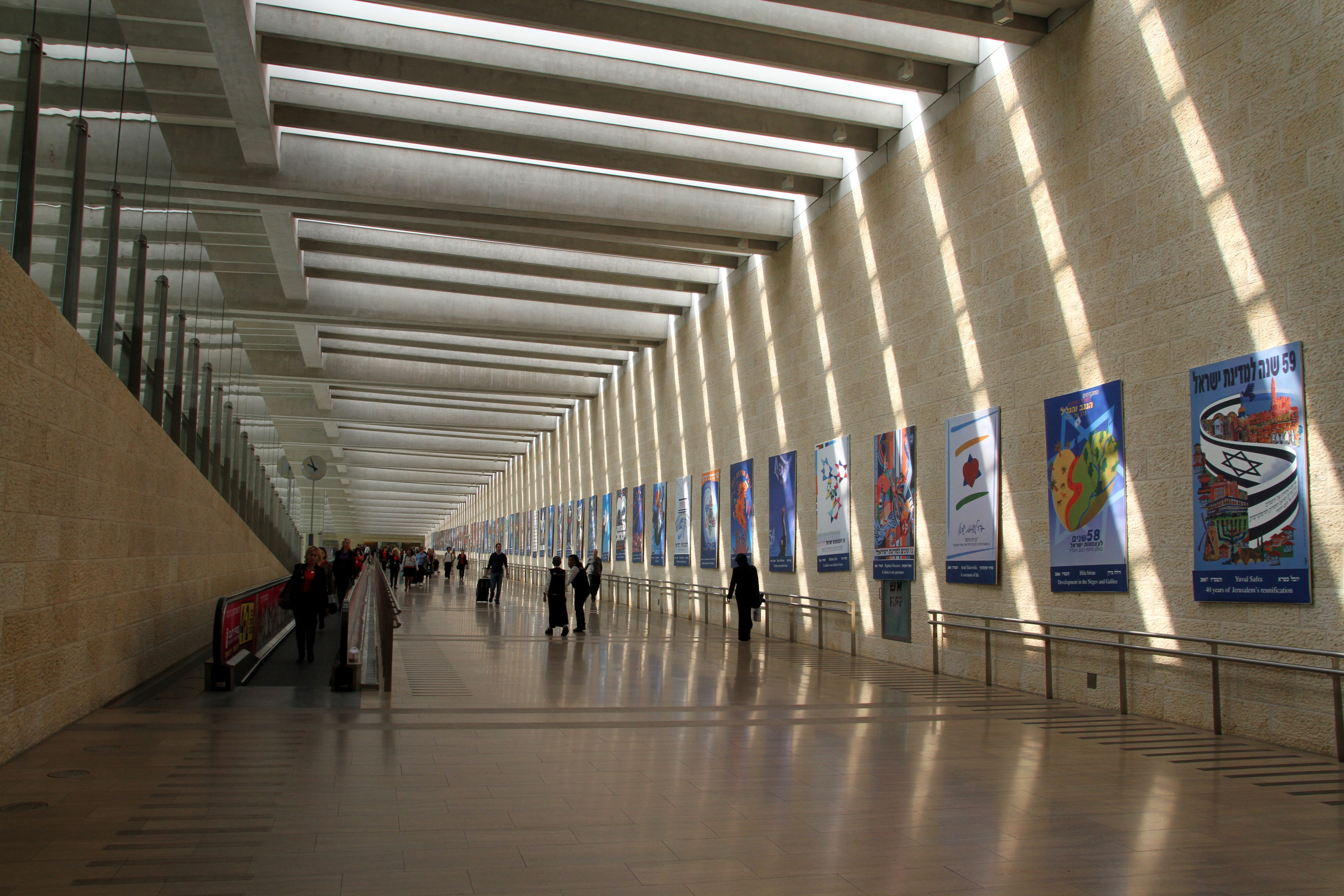
Ben Gurion International Airport

The Tel Aviv transportation system is seen as the hub of the Israeli transport network in terms of road, rail, and air transport. The Israeli road network partly centers on Tel Aviv, with some of the country's largest highways passing through or running to the city. The city forms a major part of the country's rail network, whilst Ben Gurion International Airport located near the city is the country's largest airport. There is also a strong public transport system within the city, based primarily on bus transportation.

== Local and national ==
=== Cycling ===
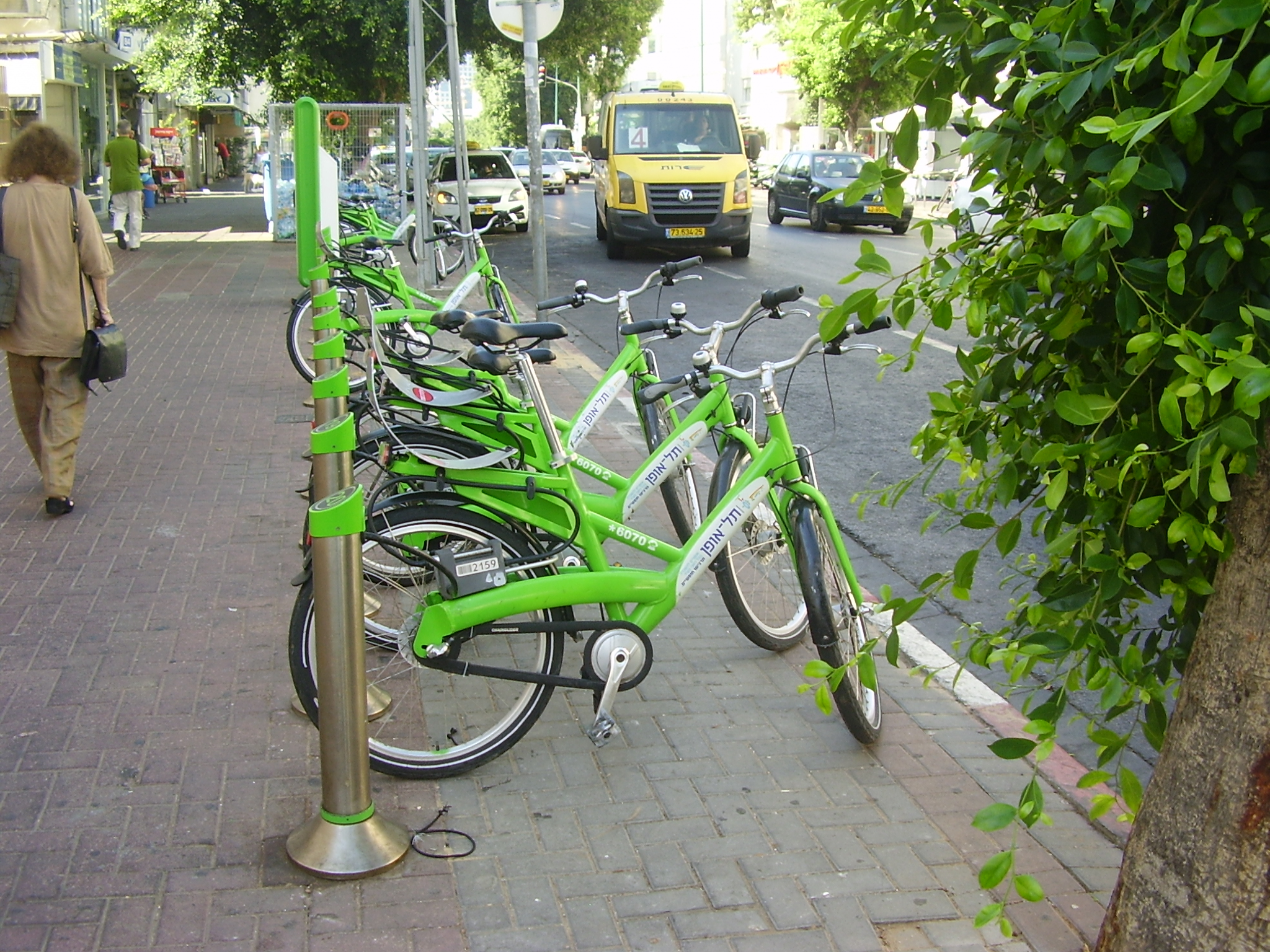
Tel-O-Fun in Tel Aviv

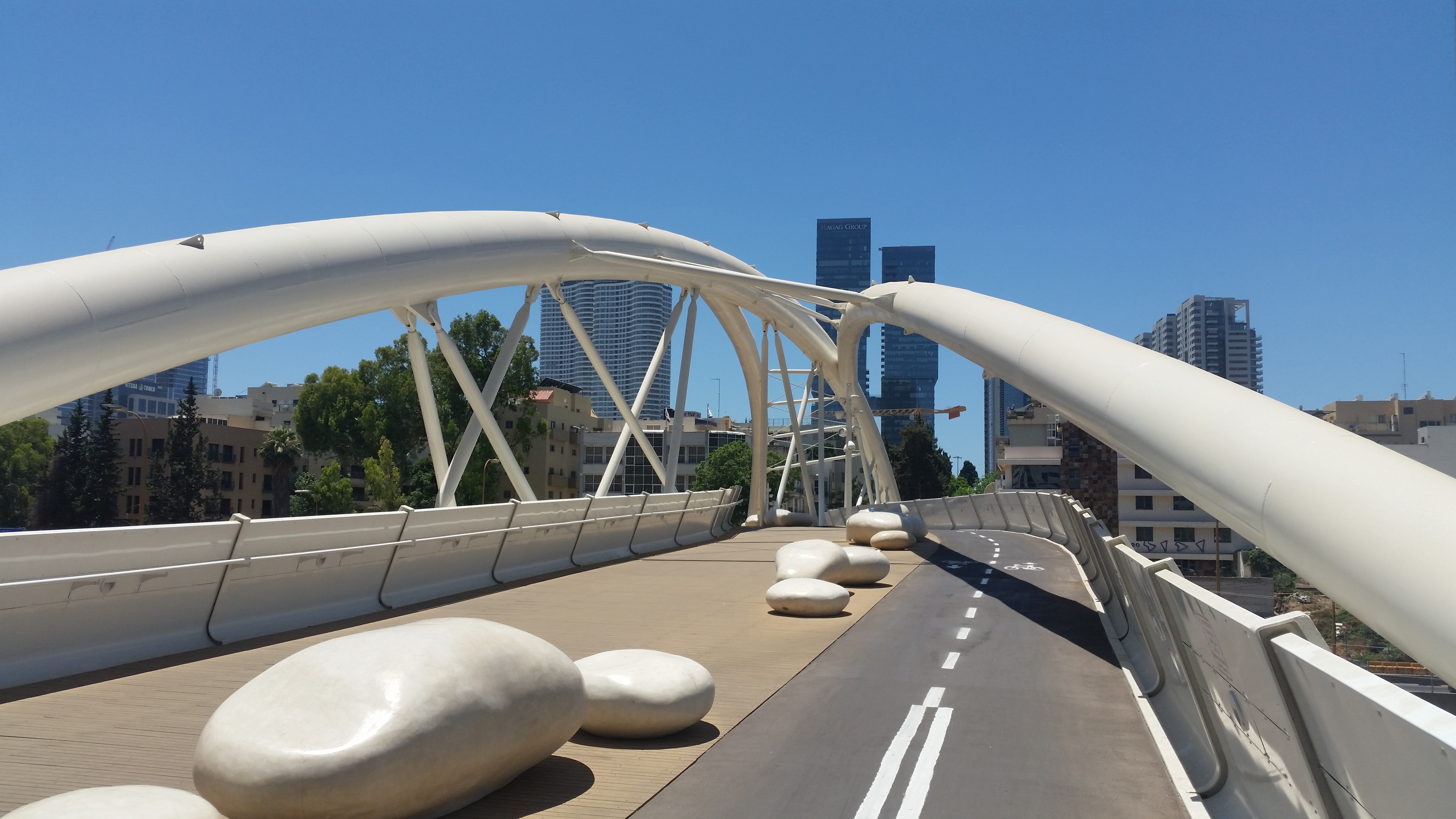
The Field Route of the Ofnidan Cycle Network passes over the Ayalon Highway at Yehudit Bridge

Tel Aviv Municipality is trying to encourage the use of bicycles in the city. The current expansion plan is to reach 250 kilometers (155.3 mi) by 2025. At the end of 2021 the total length of the network was 161 kilometers (100.0 mi).

==== Tel-O-Fun ====
In April 2011, Tel Aviv municipality launched Tel-O-Fun, a bicycle sharing system, in which 150 stations of bicycles for rent were installed within the city limits. As of May 2022, there are 175 active stations, providing about 2,000 bicycles and about 500 electric bicycles. As of the end of 2021 the municipality has completed construction of about 161 km (100 mi) of bicycle paths.

==== Ofnidan (Greater Tel Aviv Cycle Network) ====
As of 2021, construction was underway on Ofnidan, a cycle network of seven routes connecting the cities of the Gush Dan, with some segments open.

=== Electric Scooters ===
==== Regulations ====
In August 2019, the city of Tel Aviv planned regulations electrical scooter companies. These conditions included a limit of 2,500 scooters in the city per company, deactivating the scooter alarms during nighttime, designation of parking areas, and restricting minors from using the scooters.

Since January 1, 2020, all electrical scooter companies are required to have license plates on the back of each scooter. In addition, all electrical scooter companies are required to recycle the batteries of discontinued scooters in an effort to minimize e-waste.

Since February 1, 2020, electrical scooters are banned from entering areas for pedestrians only. The scooters automatically turn off upon entering the zones, and will be limited to speeds of 15 km/h upon entering zones deemed high for pedestrian traffic.

As of June 15, 2020, all electrical scooter companies must provide helmets with each scooter.

=== Rail transport ===
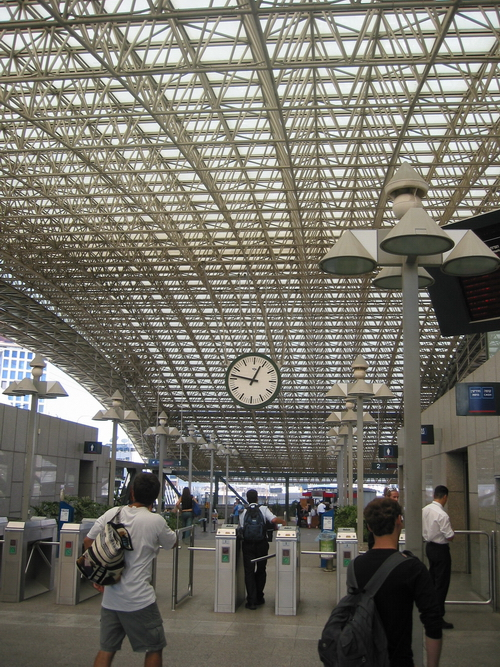
The HaShalom Rail station

Tel Aviv has four train stations along the Ayalon Highway. The stops are from north to south: Tel Aviv University, Tel Aviv Savidor Central, Tel Aviv HaShalom (near the Azrieli Center shopping mall) and Tel Aviv HaHagana (near the central bus station). It is estimated that more than a million people travel by train from the surrounding cities to Tel Aviv each month.

Since the completion of the Ayalon Highway railway section in 1993, Tel Aviv has been the central hub for rail transport in Israel. The Savidor Central Railway Station alone handled approximately 38,000 passengers a day in summer 2009. Railway lines from Tel Aviv include Israel Railways's main line, running from Beersheba to Nahariya, as well as lines to Ashkelon, Modi'in, Rishon LeTziyon, Kfar Saba and Jerusalem. Most trains stop at all stations in Tel Aviv, except for some trains to and from Be'er Sheva that do not reach Tel Aviv University, some trains bound for Rishon LeZion HaRishonim and late night trains that only stop at Tel Aviv Savidor Central. All stations of Israel Railways, other than Dimona, are directly reachable from Tel Aviv.

=== Bus transport ===
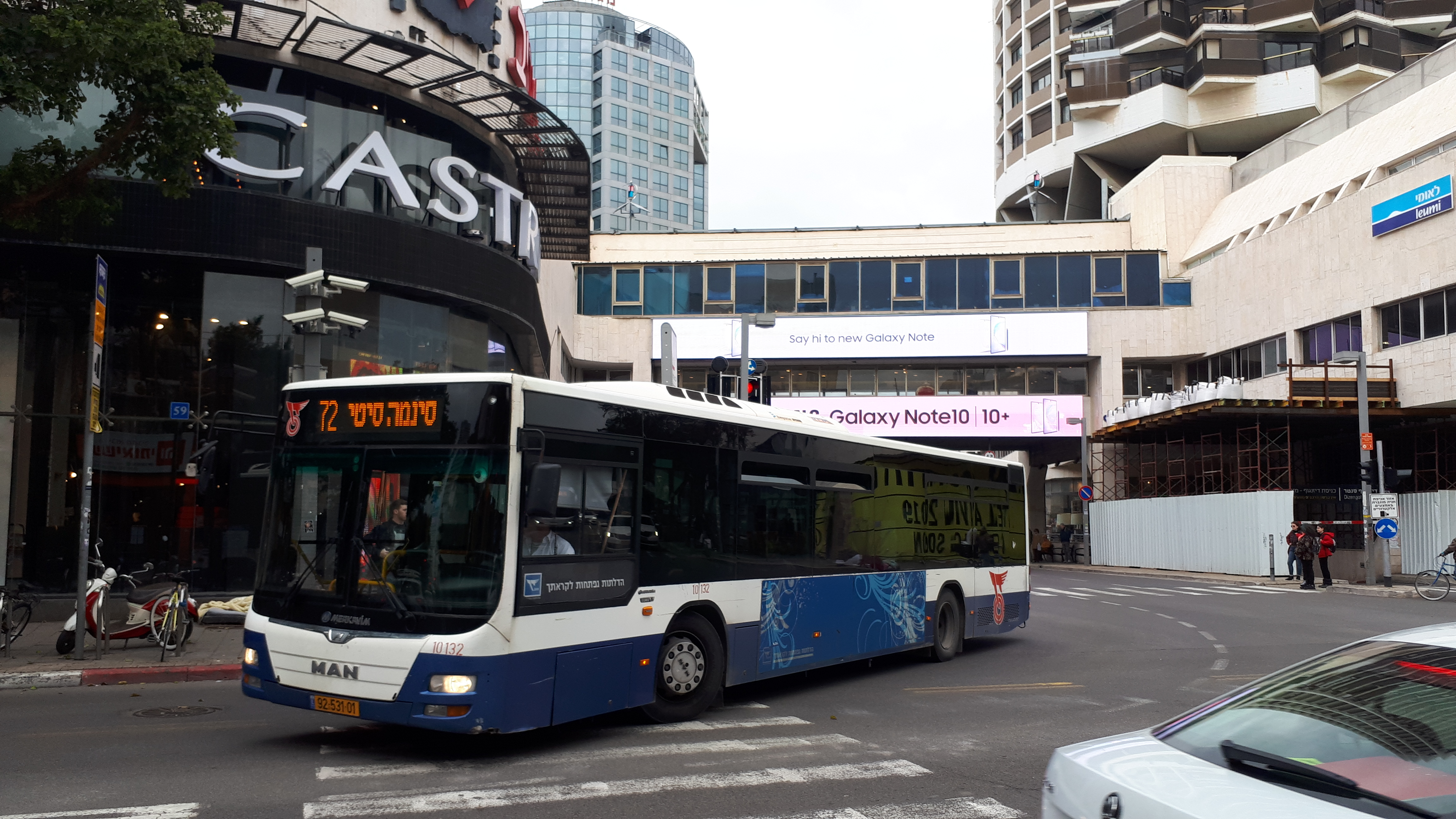
A bus on Dizengoff Street

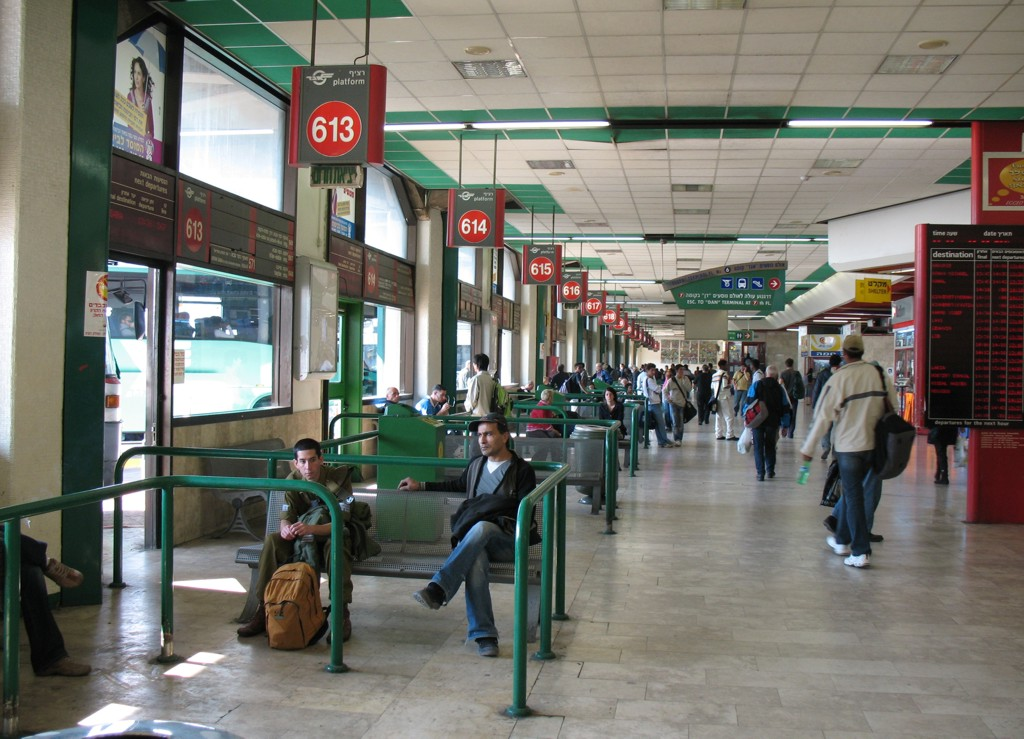
Tel Aviv Central Bus Station

The new Tel Aviv Central Bus Station is the biggest bus terminal in Israel, 400 meters from the old central bus station. The main bus network in Tel Aviv is operated by Dan Bus Company, with some metropolitan lines operated by Egged, Kavim, Afikim, and Metropoline. Few lines are dedicated to Tel Aviv, most lines serving Tel Aviv have their terminus in one of the neighboring cities. The Egged Bus Cooperative, the world's second-largest bus company, provides most intercity transportation. Intercity transportation to certain destinations is offered by other companies, including Kavim, Dan, Metropoline, and Afikim.

Following is a partial list of destinations for every bus company:

Company name	Major destinations in Gush Dan	Major large distance destinations	Notes
Egged	Holon, Rishon LeTziyon, Rehovot, Bat Yam, Azor	Jerusalem, Haifa, all destinations in the North, Hadera, Ashkelon, Eilat	
Dan	Ramat Gan, Bnei Brak, Givatayim, Petah Tikva, Bat Yam, Holon, Rishon LeTziyon, Kiryat Ono, Giv'at Shmuel	N/A	
Nateev Express (As Beit Shemesh Express)	N/A	Bet Shemesh	
Kavim	Ramla, Lod	El'ad, Shoham, Modi'in, Umm Al-Fahm, Netanya, Harish	
Metropoline	Herzliya, Raanana, Kfar Saba, Ramat Hasharon, Holon, Bat Yam, Kiryat Ono, Yehud, Or Yehuda	Be'er Sheva, Kiryat Gat, Sderot, Netivot, Netanya	
Afikim	Petah Tikva, Rosh HaAyin, Kafr Qasim	Ashdod, Yavne	
Dan BaDarom	N/A	Eshkol Regional Council	A single bus route from Tel Aviv to Eshkol Regional Council
Tnufa	N/A	Mevaseret Zion, Ariel and other destinations to Samaria	

Most intercity lines use the central bus station or the 2000 Terminal (Arlozorov Terminal) located next to the Tel Aviv Central railway station. The 2000 Terminal is the second most important terminal in Tel Aviv, and all lines from the central bus station heading North stop there.

Other important terminals include:

- The Carmelit Terminal near the Carmel Market, used by many Dan lines and a few Kavim and Egged metropolitan lines to various parts of Gush Dan
- The Reading Terminal near the power station by the same name, used by Dan lines to other parts of Tel Aviv, Holon, Rishon LeTziyon and Bat Yam, Kavim lines to Or Yehuda and Kiryat Ono, and Egged lines to Holon and Rishon LeTziyon
- The Atidim Terminal, a terminus of several urban Dan lines on the northeastern outskirts of the city

A new Bus service financed by the city and a few participating municipalities in the area, provides free bus transport during Shabat, when regular service does not work. This service, called "Na'im Busofash" ("Naim" means moving and also pleasant, Sofash is short for Sof Shavu'a = weekend) and provides bus service in the city and to/from Givatayim, Kiryat Ono, Ramat HaSharon, Shoham and Yehud-Monosson. There are 7 lines (numbers 705-711) every 20 minutes, service is on Fridays 5:00 pm to 02:00 am and Saturdays 09:00 am to 5:00 pm (line 711 has different hours and frequency). Since it is not an official government service, they cannot charge money for the rides, and therefore it's free.

=== Light rail and metro ===
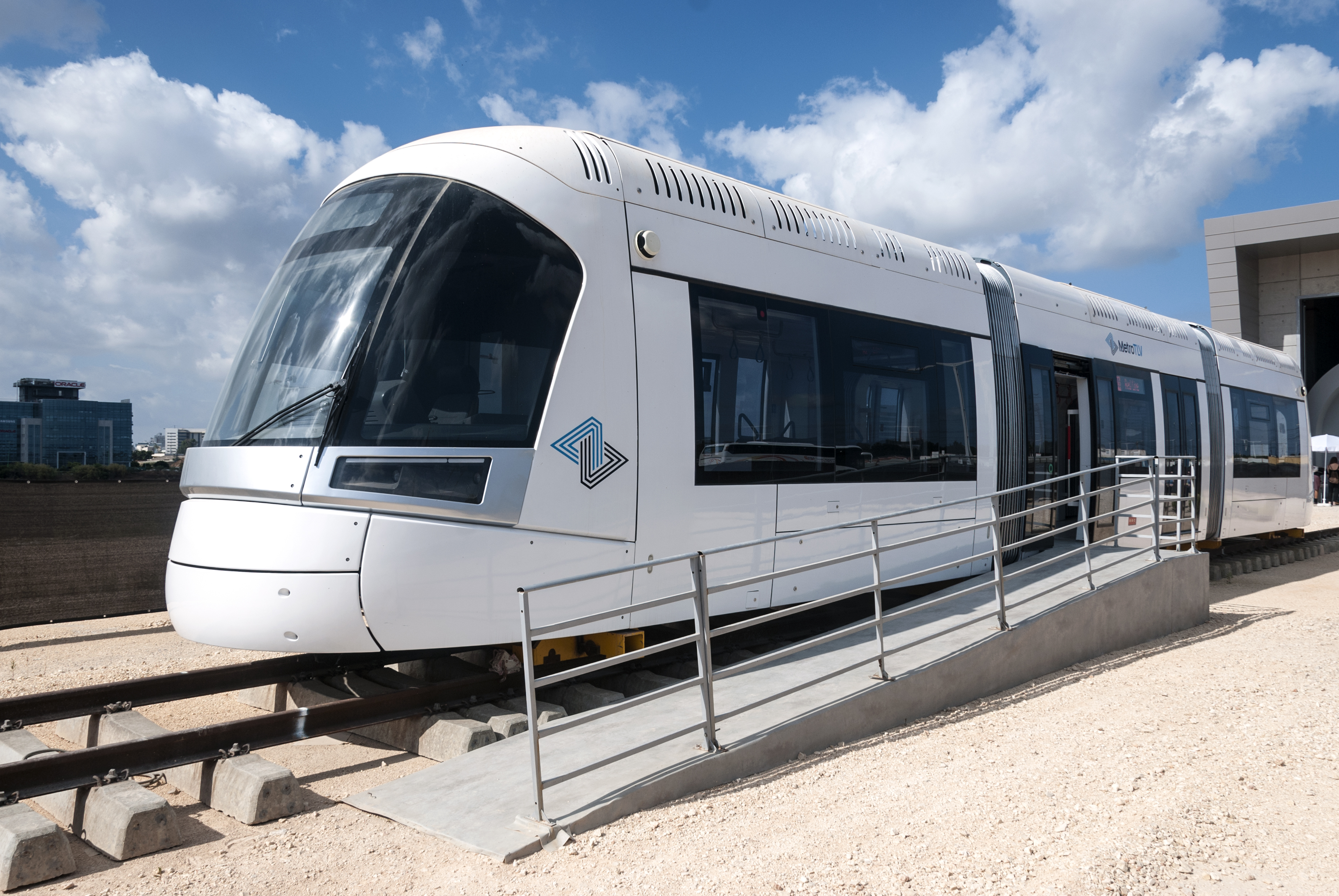
Demonstration trainset at the light rail depot

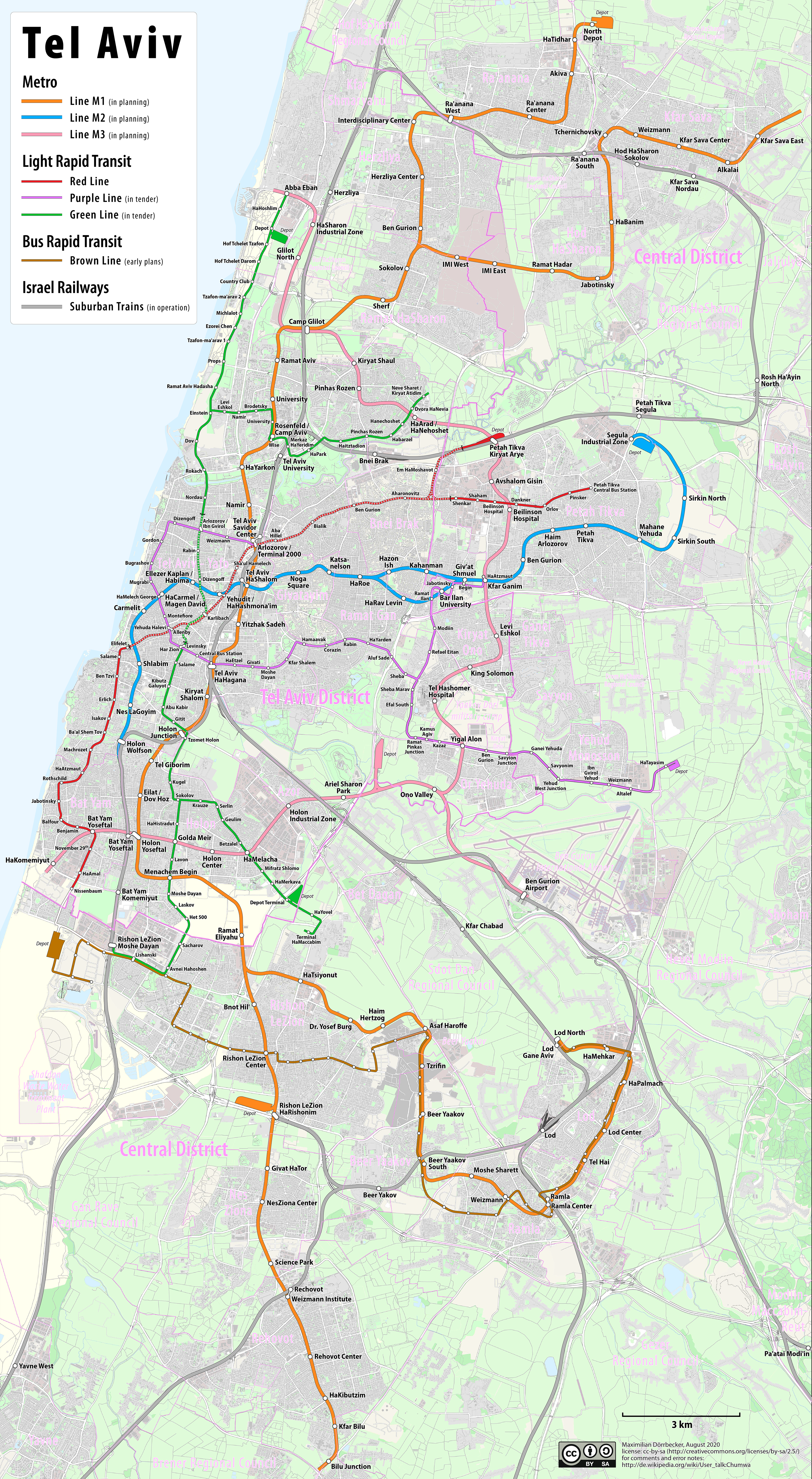
Outline map of the Tel Aviv Light Rail and Metro System

A light rail system is for the Tel Aviv metropolitan area is under construction.

- The Red Line, opened on August 18, 2023, connects Petah Tikva's Central Bus Station to Bat Yam. It follows Zeev Jabotinsky Road (Route 481) at street level; goes underground at Highway 4, and uses 10 km (6.21 mi) of tunnel to pass through Bnei Brak, Ramat Gan and Tel Aviv; re-emerges to street level just before Jaffa.
- The Green Line, set to open in 2027 or 2028, will connect Holon and the western part of Rishon LeZion to Herzelia, passing through Tel Aviv eastern and central parts, mainly through Ibn Gabirol Street (underground) and the western part of the northern neighborhoods of Tel Aviv. An extension will go east through Ramat Aviv, Tel Aviv University, Expo Tel Aviv and Ramat HaHayal.
- The Purple Line, also set to open in 2027 or 2028, will connect North Tel Aviv Savidor Central railway station to Yehud. It will circle the central part of Tel Aviv at street level, following Arlozorov street, Ben‑Yehuda street, Allenby Street, and Levinsky street. An extension to Kiryat Ono and Bar Ilan University will spit near Sheba Medical Center.

A metro system with three lines (M1, M2 and M3), 109 stations, and a total length of 150 kilometers (93.2 mi) is planned, with construction scheduled to begin in 2025 and the first sections are due to start operating in 2032.

=== Road transport ===
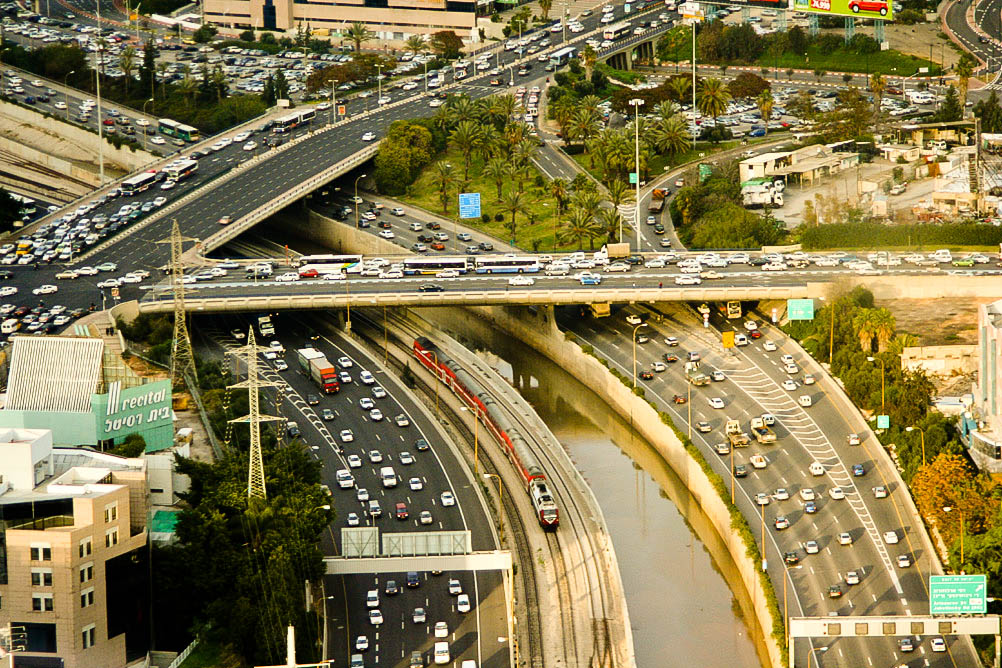
Arlozorov interchange of the Ayalon Highway, which creates a border between Tel Aviv and Ramat Gan

Many major routes of the national road network pass through or end in Tel Aviv, a transportation hub. The main road access route to Tel Aviv is the Ayalon Highway (Highway 20), which runs along the eastern side of the city from north to south along the Ayalon River riverbed, dividing for the most part Tel Aviv and Ramat Gan. Driving south on the Ayalon gives access to Highway 1, leading to Ben Gurion International Airport and Jerusalem. Within the city, the main routes are King George Street, Allenby Street, Ibn Gabirol Street, Dizengoff Street, Rothschild Boulevard, and in Jaffa the main route is Jerusalem Boulevard. Namir Road connects the city to Highway 2, Israel's main north–south highway, and Begin/Jabotinsky Road, which provides access from the east through Ramat Gan, Bnei Brak and Petah Tikva. Tel Aviv, accommodating about 500,000 commuter cars daily, suffers from increasing congestion. In 2007, the Sadan Report recommended the introduction of a congestion charge similar to that of London in Tel Aviv as well as other Israeli cities. Under this plan, road users travelling into the city would pay a fixed fee.

AutoTel is a Carsharing service of the Tel Aviv-Yafo Municipality. The service offers (as of May 2022) 360 cars (100 of them are electric) for short term rental (pay is by the minute). The cars have 520 reserved parking spaces in the city (but can be parked anywhere if it's legal and free with access to all - so other renters can get to the car and drive). This service requires registration and uses of the service's app.

== International ==
=== Air transport ===
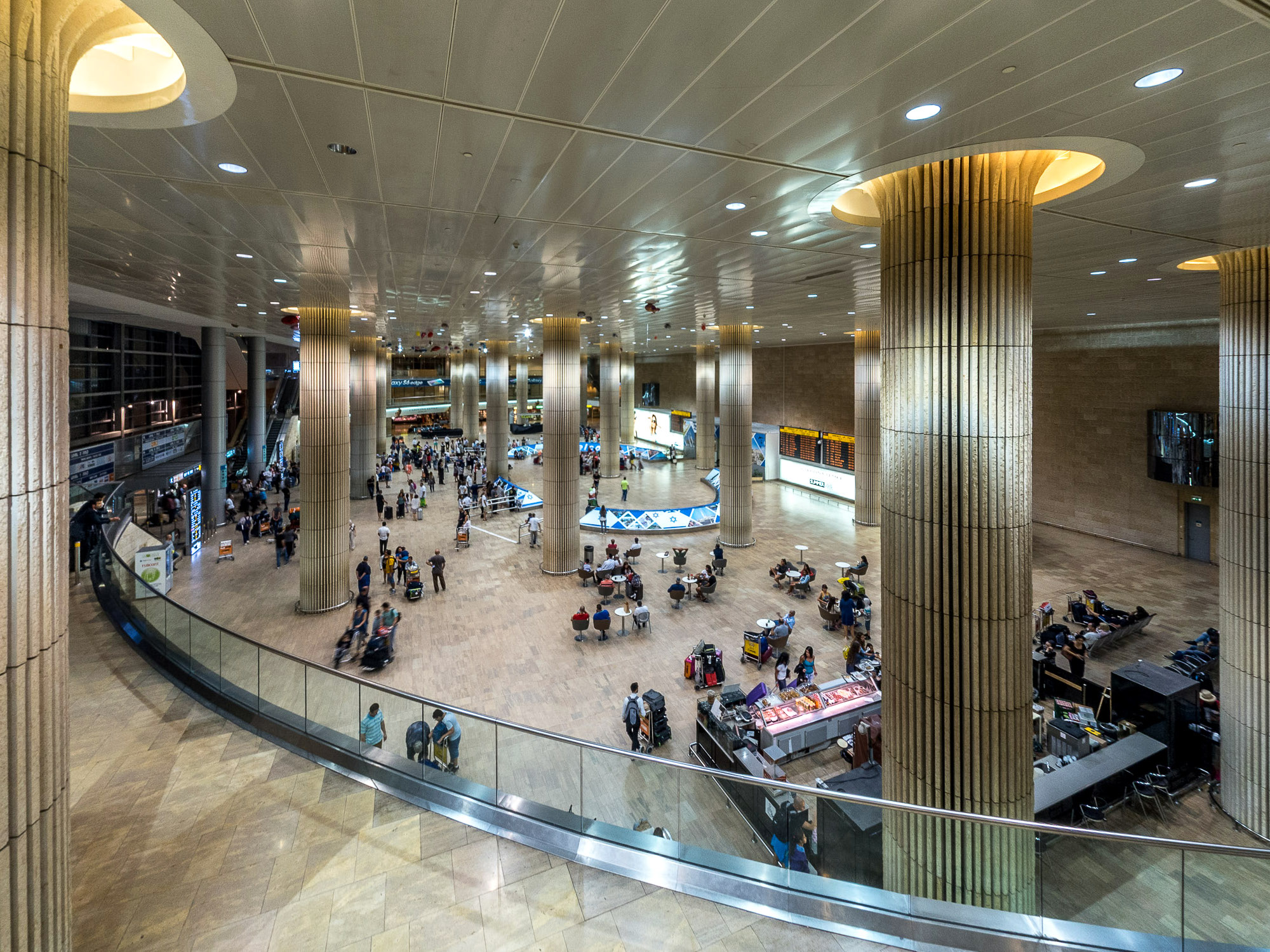
Ben Gurion International Airport

Currently there is no airport in the municipal area of Tel Aviv. Tel Aviv's domestic airport Sde Dov was closed on July 1, 2019 and all services were moved to Ben Gurion International Airport, Israel's main international airport, close to the city of Lod and 15 kilometres (9 mi) southeast of Tel Aviv.
Although officially Ben Gurion International Airport is not in the municipal jurisdiction of tel Aviv It does serve the city (and the rest of the country) as indicated by the IATA code TLV.

== Future plans ==
In early 2008, Tel Aviv Municipality announced a pilot scheme to build charging stations for electric cars. Initially, five charging points will be built, and eventually 150 points will be set up across the city as part of the Israeli electric car project, Project Better Place. Furthermore, battery replacement points will be located at the city's entrances.

There is an effort to create a system of bus priority for certain lines that are heavily used and that run through congested areas. This effort is being led by transportation professionals and environmental groups, such as Transport Today and Tomorrow, which seeks to improve sustainable transportation in Israel. Buses are currently subject to the same traffic as cars and creating specific lanes and other forms of prioritization would help to alleviate this problem.
