= Tel Aviv central bus station =

Main bus station of Tel Aviv

Coordinates: 32°3′21″N 34°46′48″E

Tel Aviv central bus station התחנה המרכזית החדשה
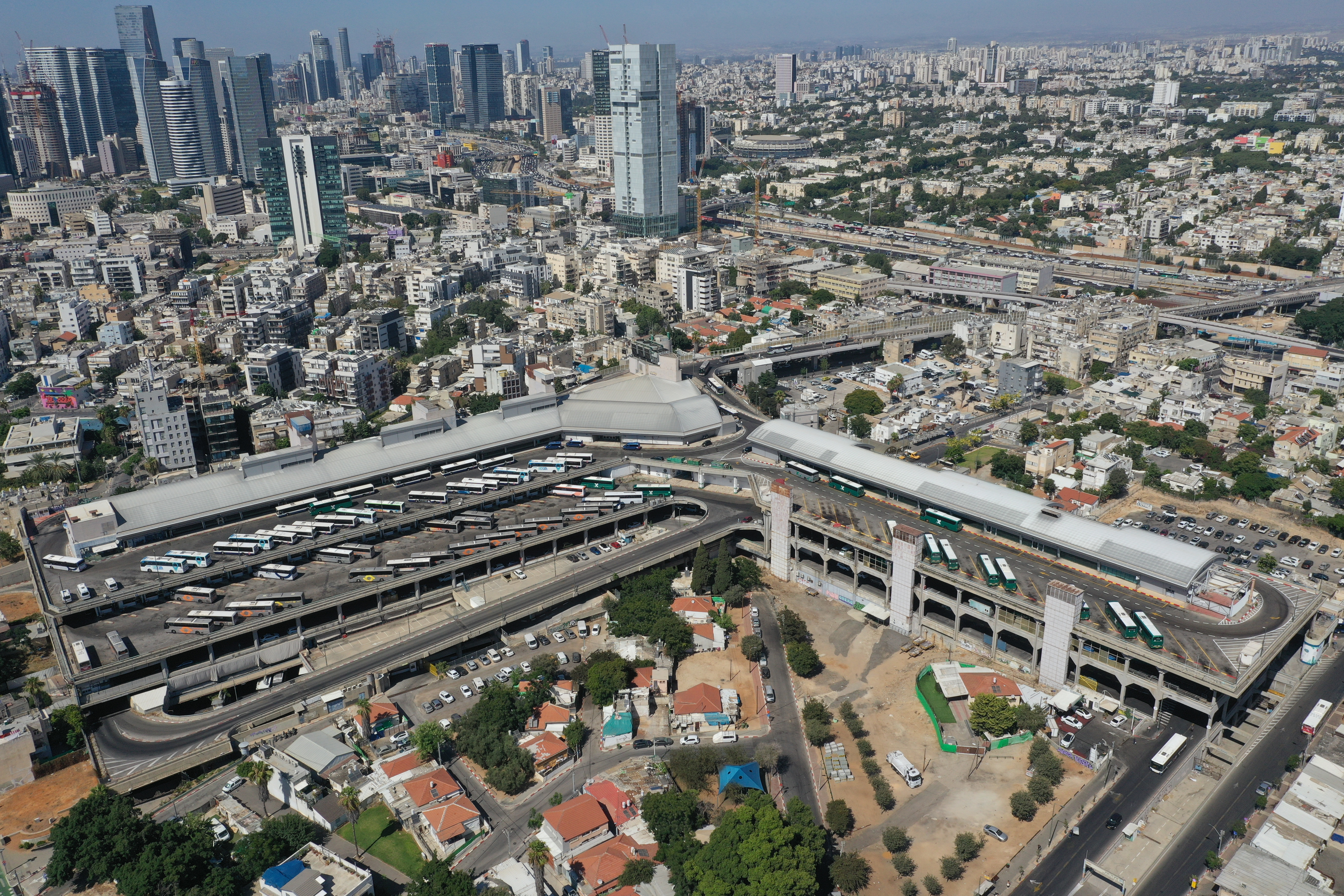
- Exterior view

General information
- Location: 108 Levinski Street, Tel Aviv, Israel
- Bus operators: Egged, Tnufa, Metropoline, Afikim, Beit Shemesh Express, Dan BaDarom, Dan, Metropoline

Construction
- Architect: Ram Karmi, Yael Rothshild, Moti Bodek

History
- Opened: August 17, 1993
Location

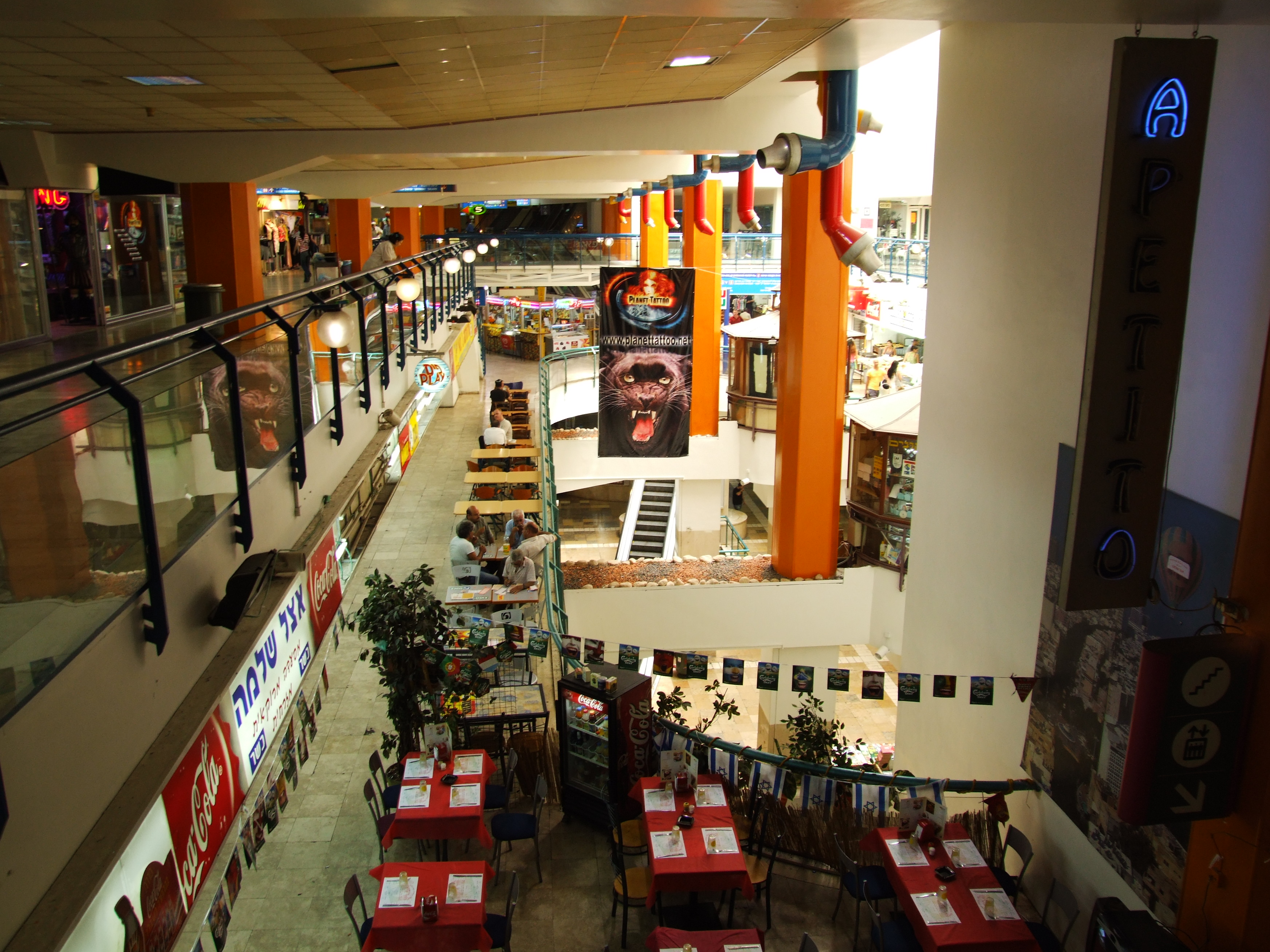
A view from the sixth floor of the mall

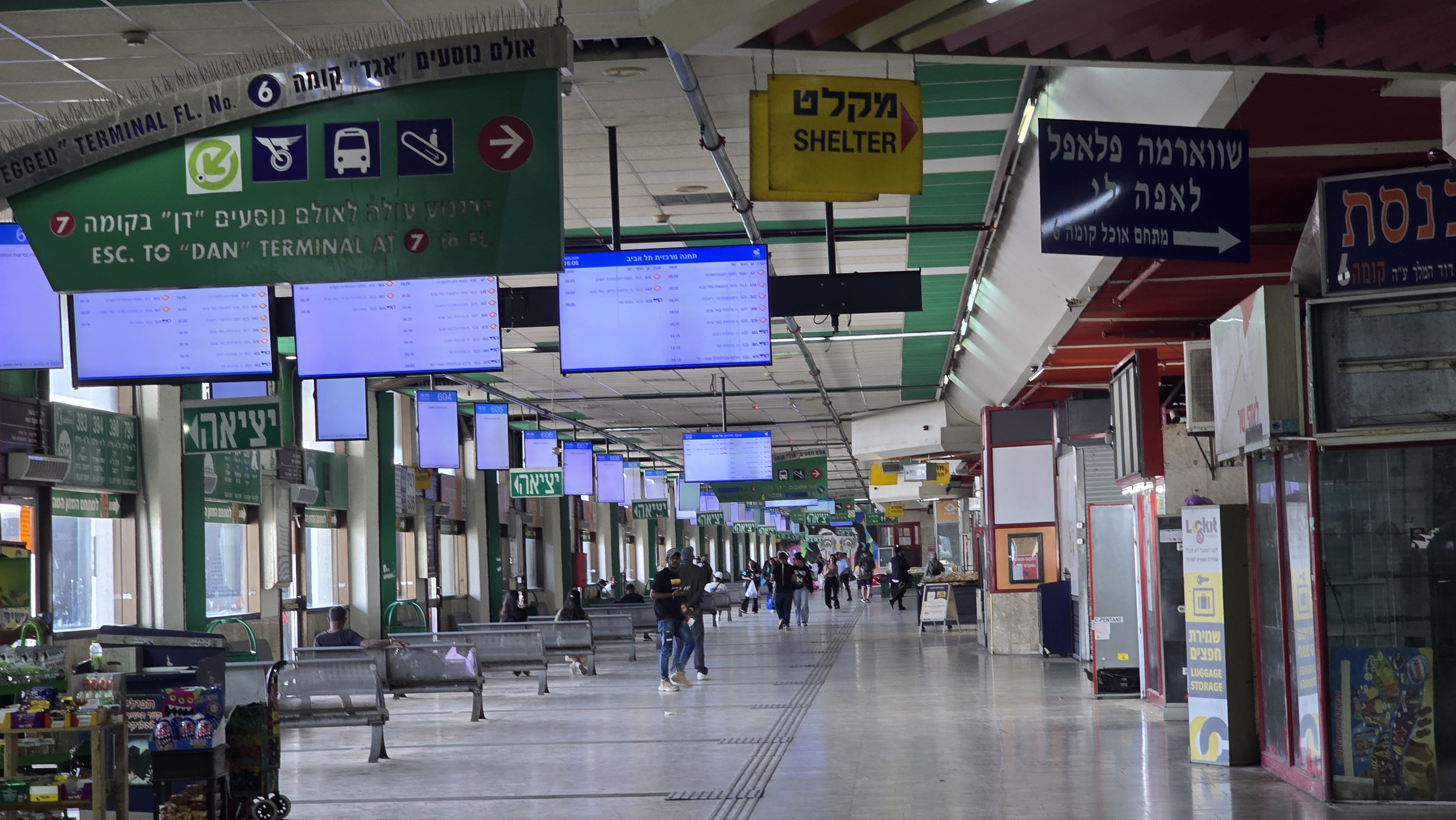
Platforms in the departure hall of the sixth floor

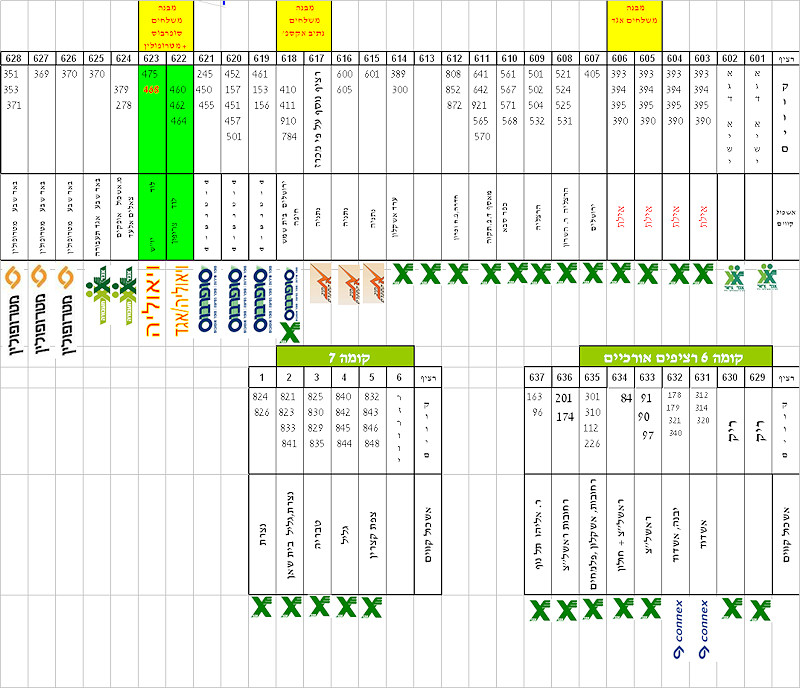
Intercity platform map of the Tel Aviv CBS

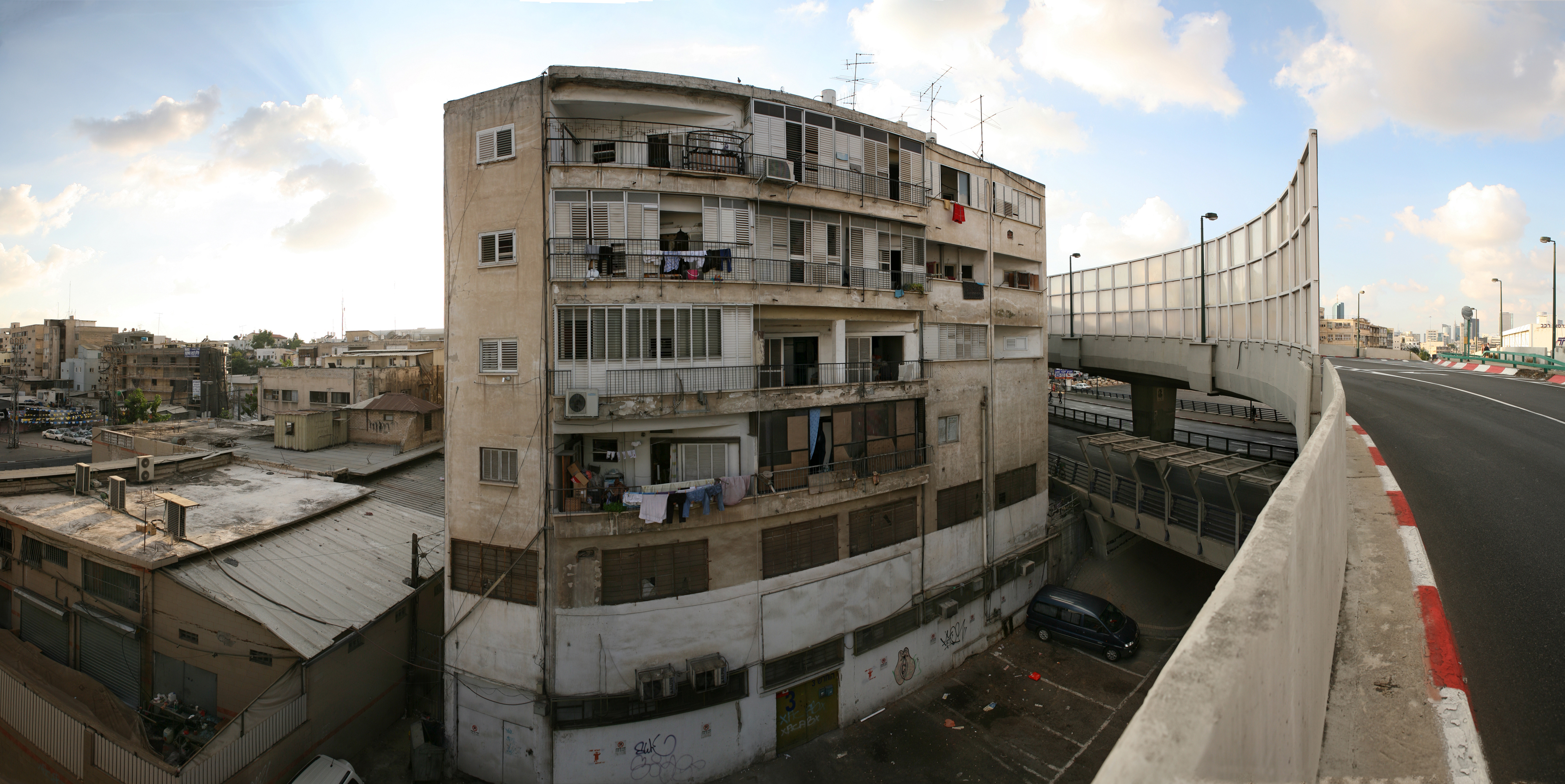
An apartment building in Neve Sha'anan neighborhood near the bus boarding platforms to the Tel Aviv central bus station. The station includes a fairly complex system of bridges, roads and interchanges to help buses to reach the various floors.

Tel Aviv central bus station, also known as the new central bus station (Hebrew: התחנה המרכזית החדשה, romanized: HaTahana HaMerkazit HaHadasha), as opposed to the now closed old Tel Aviv central bus station, is the main bus station of Tel Aviv, Israel. Located in the south of the city, it was opened on August 17, 1993. It is the second largest bus station in the world. The station in Tel Aviv covers 230,000 m^{2} and a total area of 44,000 m^{2}.

On 24 October 2021, the Tel Aviv Court for Local Affairs issued a closure order for the Tel Aviv New Central Bus Station from December 2021. Due to zoning issues, the closure has since been delayed to 2026.

== History ==
Construction began on December 14, 1967, but work was prematurely halted due to financial difficulties. The building was finally inaugurated on August 18, 1993. The inauguration ceremony was attended by Prime Minister Yitzhak Rabin and the mayor of Tel Aviv Shlomo Lahat. The station's prolonged construction period gave it the title of white elephant among the public, and in light of this, the inauguration ceremony included releasing a white elephant balloon into the sky.

The station, which was designed by Ram Karmi (1967) and completed (1993) by the architects Yael Rothshild, and Moti Bodek, opened with six floors, and the initial plan called for buses to travel to all six. In practice, only four of the six floors were used as bus terminals, and in 1998 the first- and second-floor platforms were transferred to the newly opened 7th floor. This act killed off the remaining businesses on the first two floors and hurt businesses on the third.

In earlier stages of planning, the station was intended to have just two stories, one for commerce and one for buses. Disagreements between the two main bus companies led to a third floor, so there would be one floor for each bus company. To obtain more funding after construction stalled in the 1970s, an extra floor of retail was added. This process was repeated several times, until the station had six floors total. The seventh floor was added to replace the bottom two floors, after high pollution levels were discovered on those floors. The station was deliberately designed to be confusing, so that commuters would spend more time around the stores, and thus more money. When designed the station was in Tel Aviv's downtown, but by the time it opened the business center had migrated north, and the station's neighborhood had become peripheral and impoverished. One abandoned area of the station has been occupied by a bat colony.

In January 2012, the owners of the station filed for its bankruptcy.

=== Expected closure ===
On 24 October 2021, the Tel Aviv Court for Local Affairs issued a closure order for the New Central Bus Station from December 2021. Consequently, the Tel Aviv-Yafo Municipality and the Israel Fire and Rescue Services have told the store owners that they would have to close from 5 December and the bus companies would also have to make alternative arrangements. Earlier that month, the Tel Aviv - Yafo Municipality, Ministry of Transport and the Israel Land Authority announced that the station would close down, and a new terminal near the Panorama Center in southern Tel Aviv would be set up. That move is to be sped up because the Fire Service has refused to give the Central Bus Station a license to operate. However, in early 2022, the Ministry of Transport announced that the closure would be delayed until at least 2026.

== Specifications ==
The station occupies an L-shaped building. Its long arm (220 m) faces Levinski street, and the short arm (140 m) faces Zemach David St.

The complex includes a shopping mall serviced by 29 escalators and 13 elevators with over 1,000 shops and restaurants. Only two of the seven floors are used as a bus terminal (6th and 7th floor). The main entrances are on the north and east sides of 4th floor. Most intercity buses leave from a departure hall on the north (main) wing on 6th floor. On the 7th floor, which was an addition to the original building, there is a departure hall for local buses (to destinations within Gush Dan) on the north wing, and another departure hall for intercity buses (to destination in the Galilee) on the south wing. The wings of this level are completely separated.

The station serves Egged, Tnufa, Metropoline, Afikim, Beit Shemesh Express and Dan BaDarom intercity bus routes as well as local Dan, Egged and Metropoline city and suburban buses. In 2008, approximately 100,000 people visited the station building every day. In 2018 this number went down to 80,000.

It covers 230,000 m^{2} and a total area of 44 dunams (44,000 m^{2}).

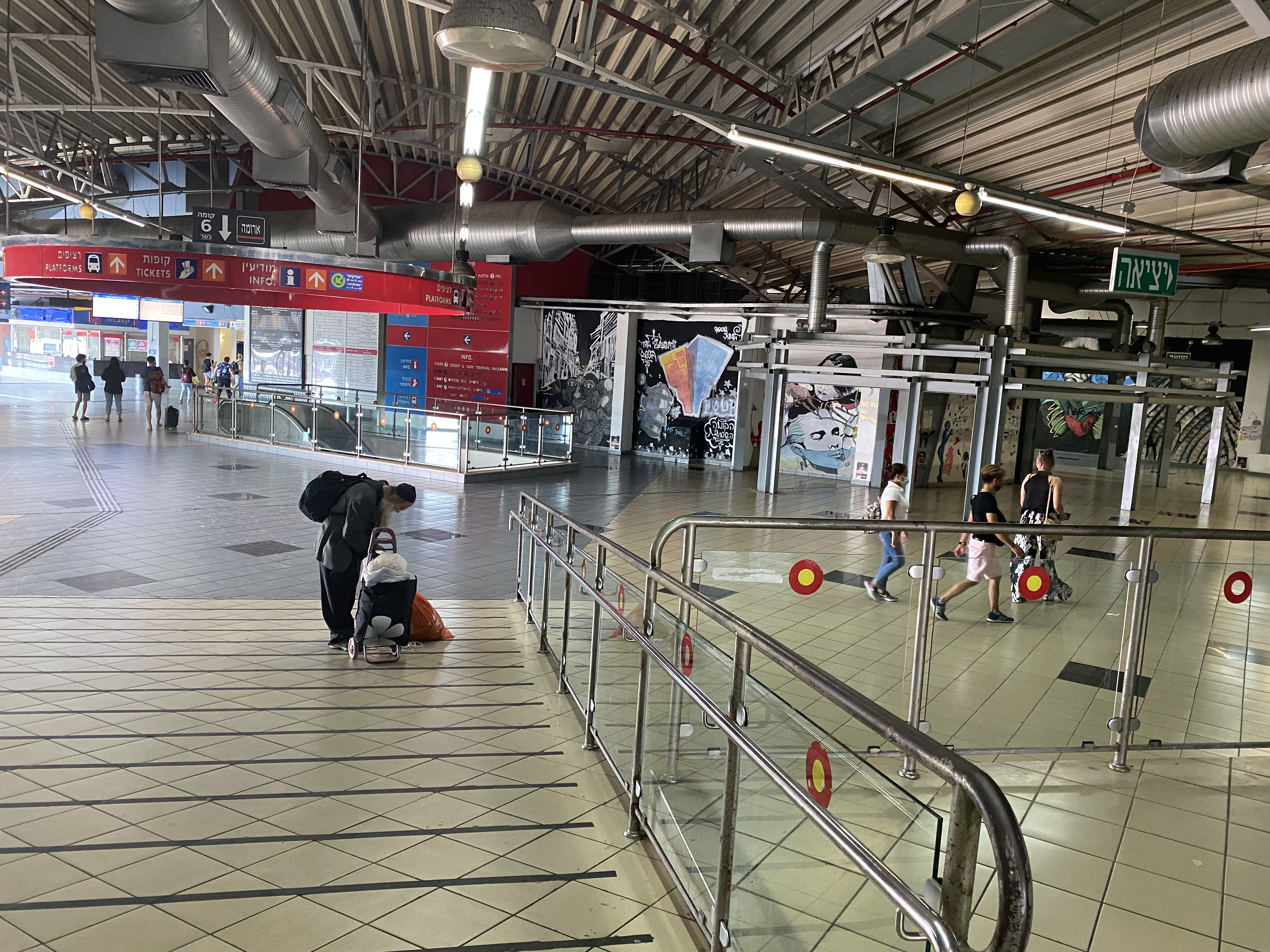
A view of the interior of the bus station in 2021

Tel Aviv central bus station is located near Tel Aviv HaHagana Railway Station, but there is no direct link between them.

Although the Tel Aviv Central Bus station is the largest bus station in Tel Aviv in terms of building size, the Tel Aviv Central Bus Terminal (also known as the "2000 Terminal" and situated next to the Tel Aviv central railway station) handles considerably more bus passengers per day than the Central Bus Station.

== Problems and criticism ==
The Tel Aviv central bus station has suffered from severe neglect and disrepair. As the station is located in the poorest part of the city, numerous drug addicts, prostitutes and homeless people take residence there on occasion. In 2010, there was a murder and three reported cases of rape in the station.

The station has also been criticized for its complicated design which makes it hard to get around, and for being built in a neighborhood that didn't fit its character.

== In literature ==
The bus station is the centre of author Lavie Tidhar's novel Central Station, set in a far-future Tel Aviv in which the station becomes a planetary hub and gateway to the stars. The novel follows the lives of the descendants of the migrant workers who live in the area now.

== See also ==
- List of shopping malls in Israel
- Jerusalem central bus station
- Transport in Tel Aviv

== Literature ==
- שביט, יעקב; ביגר, גדעון (2002). ההיסטוריה של תל־ אביב (in Hebrew). Vol. עיר מטרופולין (1974-1993). תל־ אביב: הוצאת רמות, אוניברסיטת תל־ אביב. ISBN 965-274-360-7.
