= Egyptian airstrike on the Old Tel Aviv central bus station =

Egyptian operation during the 1948 Arab–Israeli War

- Part of the 1948 Arab–Israeli War
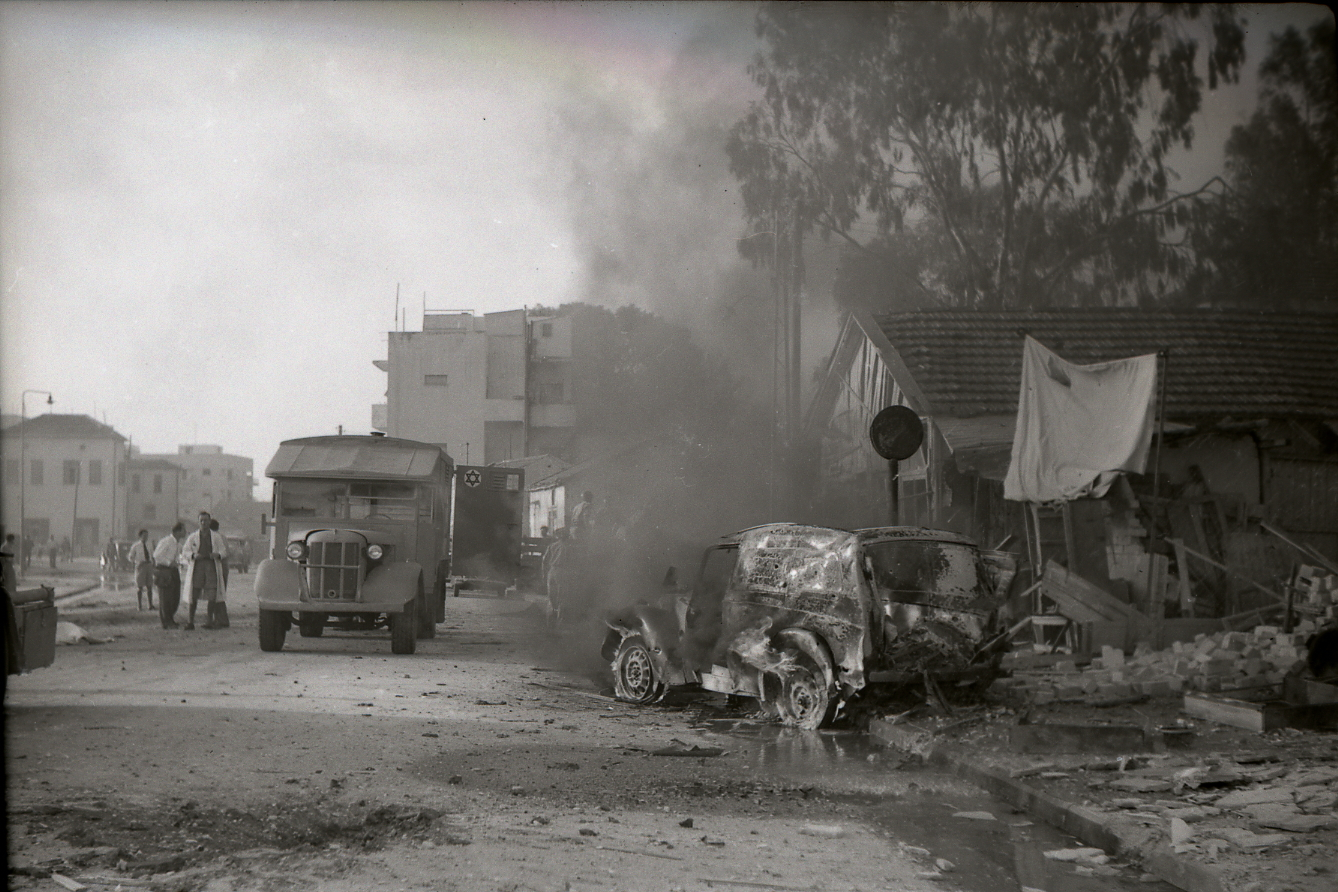
- Damaged and ruined buildings and vehicles following the attack
- Location: 32°03′37″N 34°46′43″E; Old Tel Aviv central bus station, Tel Aviv, Israel
- Date: May 18, 1948
- Attack type: Airstrike
- Weapon: Aerial bomb
- Deaths: 42
- Injuries: 100+
- Perpetrator: Royal Egyptian Air Force

On May 18, 1948, the Royal Egyptian Air Force bombed the Old Tel Aviv central bus station four days after Israel declared independence, killing 42 people.

The attack occurred during the 1948 Arab–Israeli War amid a bombing campaign by Egyptian forces in Tel Aviv that killed 150 people in total. The bombing occurred on May 18 when Egyptian C-47s launched an attack on the bus station, which was crowded with passengers at the time. The Palestine Post reported a "50-pound fragmentation bomb" shook the building. 42 people died in total, including four members of the Dan Bus Company. Over 100 people were injured.

The bus station was significantly damaged by the explosion, which was also the deadliest attack of its kind by the Egyptian Air Force. Many Israelis, especially residents of Tel Aviv, were outraged by the incident and called for the Israeli Air Force to bomb Egypt in retaliation. The bombing also convinced many pilots, including Lou Lenart, to join the war on behalf of Israel.

== See also ==
- History of Tel Aviv
- Killings and massacres during the 1948 Palestine war
