= Old Tel Aviv central bus station =

Former bus station in Tel Aviv, Israel

Old Tel Aviv central bus station התחנה המרכזית הישנה של תל אביב
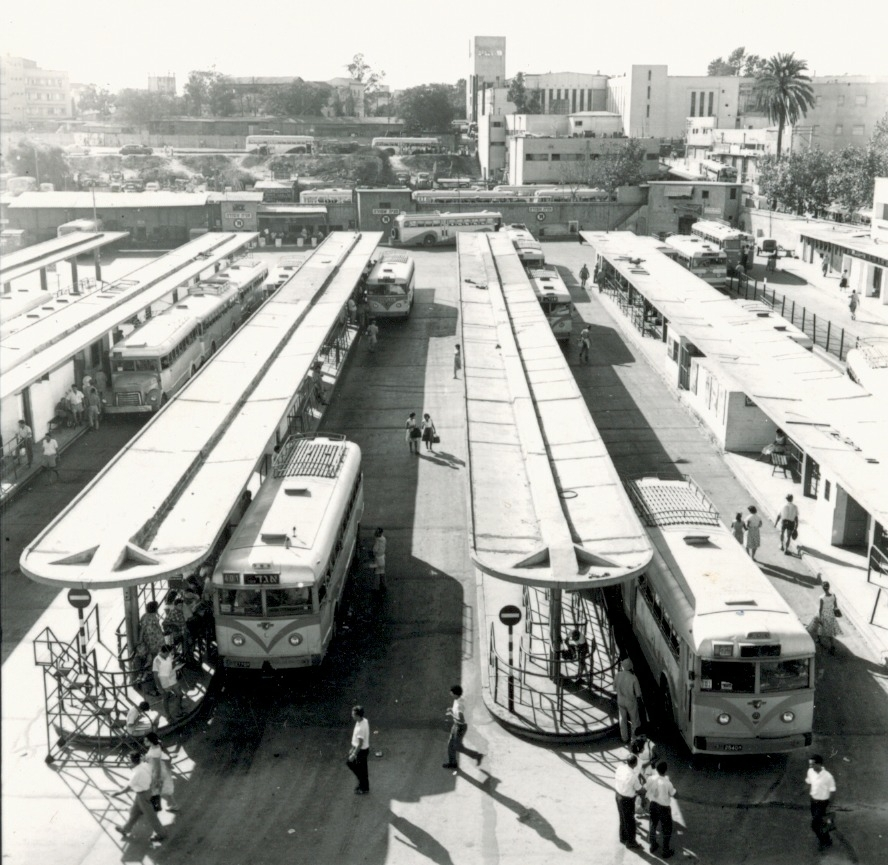

General information
- Location: Israel
- Coordinates: 32°03′37″N 34°46′43″E

Other information
- Status: Inactive station

History
- Opened: 1941 (opened); May 1942 (inaugurated)
- Closed: 31 July 2009
Location

The Old Tel Aviv central bus station was the main bus station of Tel Aviv from 1941 until 1993. The station served intercity bus routes as well as local city and suburban buses. On 18 August 1993, Tel Aviv's New central bus station became the city's new transportation hub. The old station was demolished in July 2009.

== History ==
When the station opened in 1941, it was intended to serve 60,000 passengers a day. It had six departure platforms linked by underground passages and another platform for arrivals. Soon after its opening, it was found to be inadequate and poorly planned. The canopies over the platforms were too narrow to protect passengers from rain and sun, and interfered with loading of baggage onto the roofs of the buses.

During the 1948 Arab–Israeli War the station was bombed by Egyptian planes, killing 42 persons, including four members of the Dan cooperative, and wounding 100.

On 6 November 1970, two bombs exploded in Tel Aviv at the central bus station killing one person and injuring 24.

On 18 August 1993, the main terminus for buses and taxis moved to the new Tel Aviv bus station and the old station was used mainly as a parking lot. On 31 July 2009, Egged rerouted all remaining bus lines passing through the station. On 2 August 2009 the last platforms were demolished.

In the 2000s the area became a centre for prostitution.

In 2010s the area became populated by foreign workers. In 2011, redevelopment plans for the area were approved and in 2015, Levinstein Properties and Shikun & Binui Holdings Ltd. jointly bought most of the land. In 2017, plans to build the Shomron Complex, comprising both residential and office space, were approved for deposit. As the area was expected to undergo a new era of gentrification for the area, many raids and closures of premises used for prostitution were carried out. In 2020, plans for the Shomron Complex were approved. In January 2023, Levinstein Properties announced that it had received the first permit for demolition works in the area, which would begin shortly.

== See also ==
- Transport in Tel Aviv
