= Ha'argaz =

Israeli cooperative based in Tel Aviv

Ha’argaz Group Ltd.
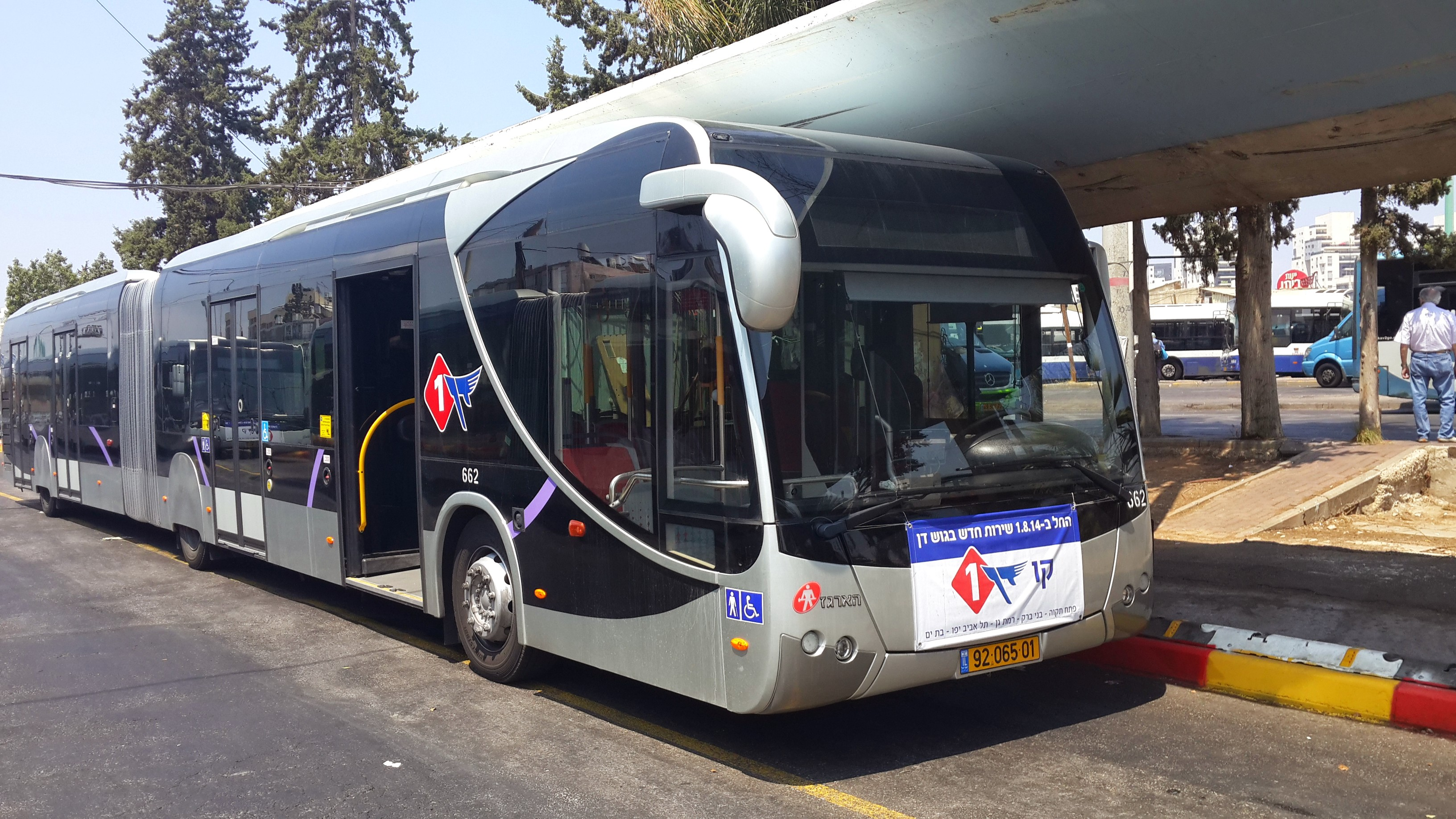
- Ha'argaz Urbanit bus
- Industry: Transportation
- Founded: 1932; 94 years ago
- Headquarters: Tel Aviv, Israel
- Products: Bus and track assembly, Storage, Cooling and Display Systems Building materials
- Revenue: ₪ 319.2 million (2015)
- Number of employees: 550 (2015)
- Website: www.haargaz.com

Ha'argaz is an Israeli cooperative founded in Tel Aviv in 1932. It is one of Israel's oldest industrial companies.

== History ==
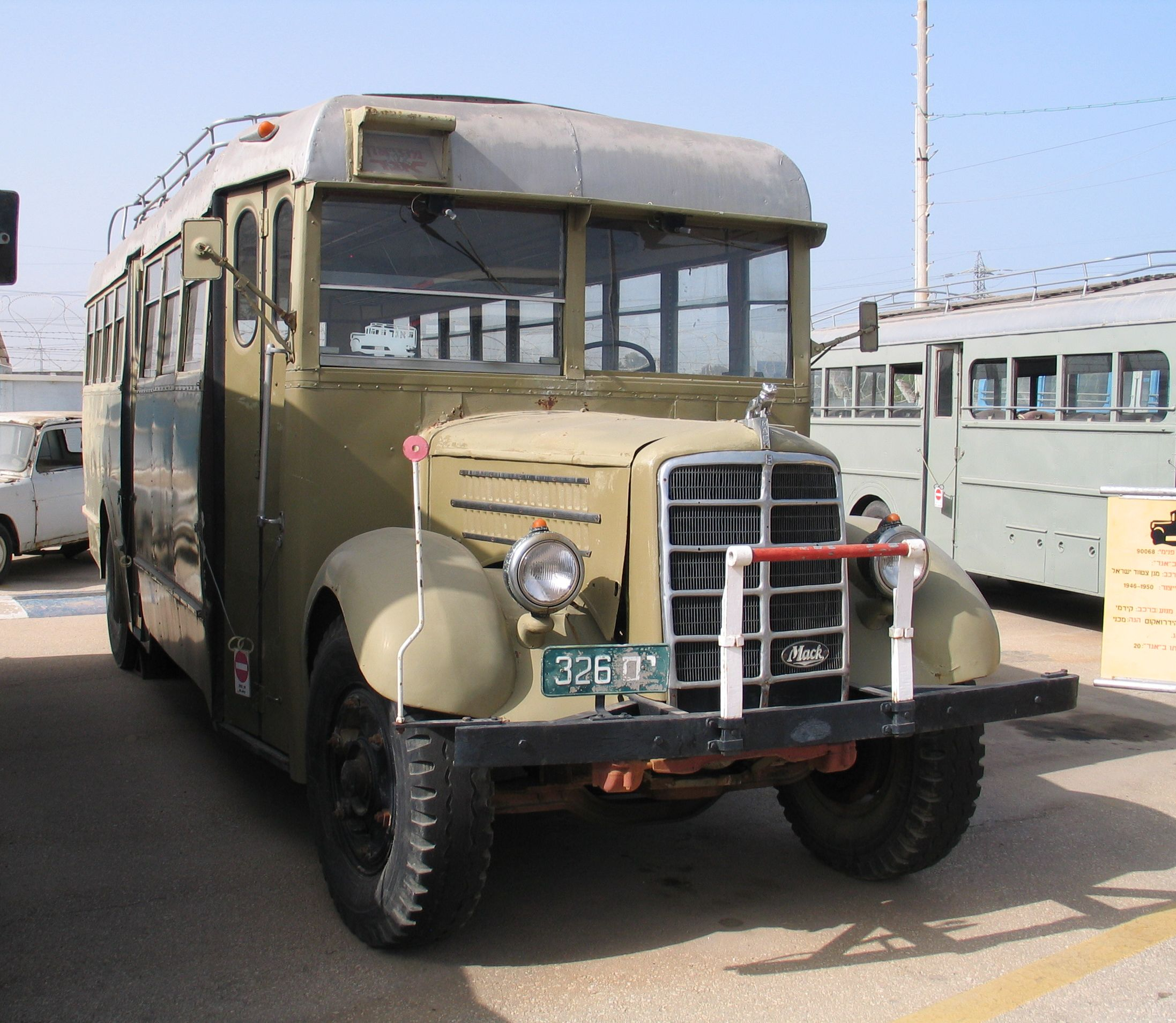
Bus built on a Mack Trucks chassis, manufactured by Ha'argaz, 1946

Ha'argaz was founded on August 18, 1932, as a cooperative that produced crates for the citrus industry. The first factory opened on May 1, 1933, on the corner of Salomon and Gaon streets in Tel Aviv. An expert was brought to oversee production of vehicles. On September 15, 1933, another factory was opened in the Neve Shaanan neighborhood. During heavy rains in November 1938, the factory in Neve Shaanan was flooded and workers toiled for hours save the raw materials.

In 1936, a defense plant was established that produced armored and protective vehicle bodies.

During World War II the plant expanded and added many full-time employees. It was decided in 1945 to convert to a company half owned by investors and half-owned by a workers cooperative.

In 1949, Ha'argaz began to manufacture jerry cans, military helmets and a variety of logistical equipment for the newly established Israeli army. It also collaborated with AMPA, becoming the exclusive import agent for Philco refrigerators from the United States. This collaboration led to the creation of Amcor, a refrigerator and electrical appliance manufacturer.

Starting in 2009, the company moved its bus factory from Tel Aviv to an industrial zone near Kiryat Mal'akhi.

Today Ha'argaz manufactures buses for the Egged and Dan bus companies and other private and public transportation companies in Israel. Its crate factory is the second largest in Israel.

== Organization ==
Haargaz group combines several subsidiaries:

- Ha’argaz Transportation - Development, design and manufacturing of buses. Ha'argaz builds Low entry urban coaches, low-entry urban coaches, Suburban low-entry coaches, Inter-city coaches, armored inter-city coaches, Luxury touring coaches. Coaches are built on Mercedes, DAF, MAN, Scania, and Volvo chassis.
- Ha’argaz Building Industries - based in the Ramla Industrial Zone, designs and manufacturers prefabricated buildings including mobile and modular houses, Caravans, offices, industrial buildings, schools, nurseries, classrooms, and community buildings.
- Ha’argaz Storage, Cooling and Display Systems – Providing Storage, Refrigeration and Display systems.
- Ha’argaz Technopach Metal Industries Ltd - produces industrial civil and military packaging, including handling equipment and aviation equipment, electronic packaging for the electronics and communications industries and the high-tech industry. Advanced metal processing for the security & defense market.
- Taditel Ltd - develops and manufactures microelectronic technologies for the automotive and hi-tech industries.

== See also ==
- Egged Israel Transport Cooperative Society Ltd
- Economy of Israel
