= Tel Aviv Central Station =

Tel Aviv Central Station may refer to:

- Tel Aviv Central Bus Station
- Tel Aviv Savidor Central Railway Station
