= Egged (company) =

Israeli bus company

Egged Transportation Ltd

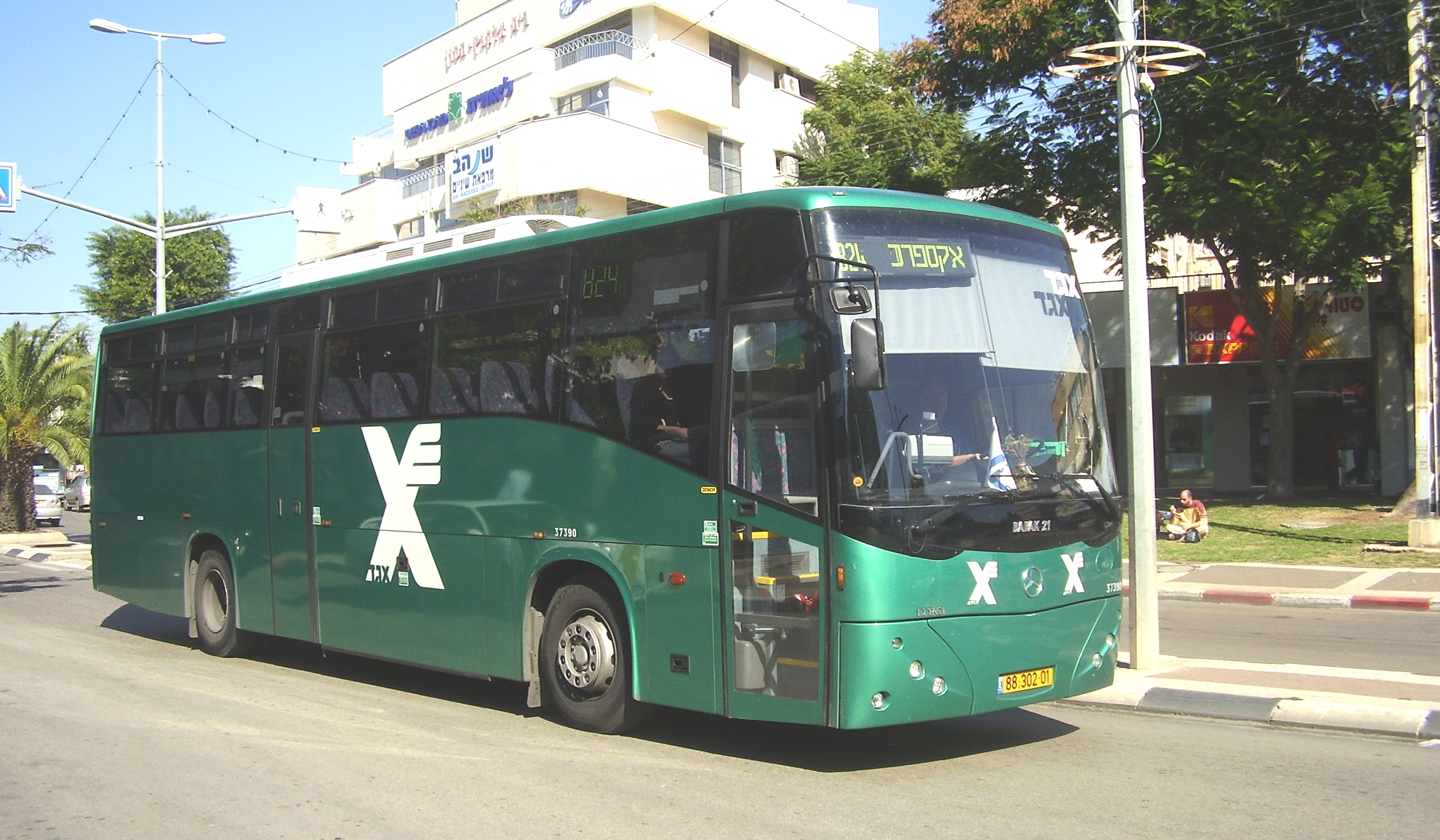
- Parent: Self-owned; 1,500 members 6,500 employees
- Founded: 1933
- Headquarters: Amot ParkTech; Beit Dagan; Israel
- Service area: Israel (nationwide); Golan Heights; West Bank; Poland; Netherlands
- Fleet: 2,950
- Daily ridership: 900,000 (Israel)
- Annual ridership: 264,200,000 (Israel)
- Website: egged.co.il/en

Egged Transportation Ltd (Hebrew: אֶגֶד, pronounced [ˈe.ɡed]; Arabic: إيجد) is the largest transit bus company in Israel. Egged's intercity bus routes reach most Israeli cities, towns, kibbutzim, moshavim and settlements, and the company operates urban city buses throughout the country. It also operates the subsidiaries Mobilis (company) in Poland and EBS (Netherlands) in the Netherlands.

Egged provides about 35% of Israel's public transport services, employs about 6,500 workers and operates a fleet of 2,950 buses. Egged buses transport about 900,000 passengers per day.

== History ==
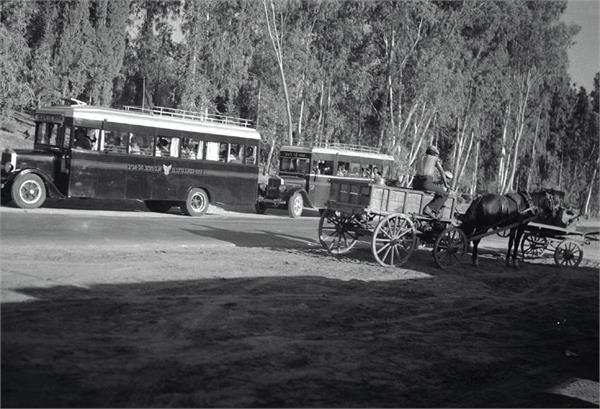
Bus stop Hadera 1937

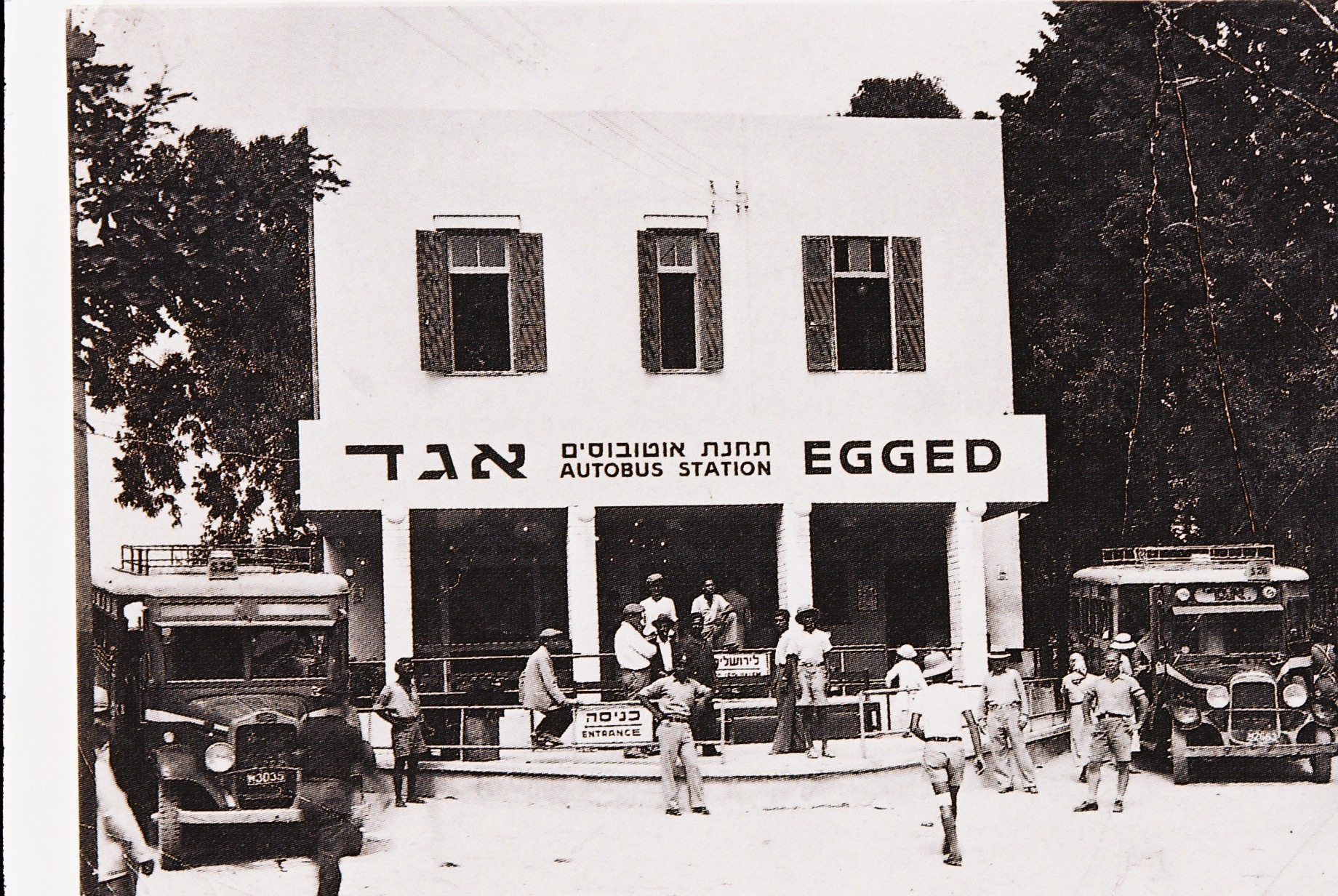
Egged Tel Aviv central bus station, 1930–1940

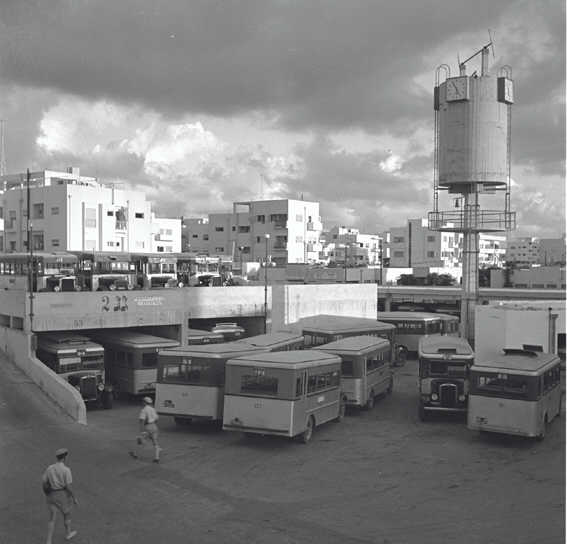
HaMa’avir bus station, Tel Aviv, 1945

Egged was created in 1933 through a merger of four smaller intercity bus cooperatives in and around Tel Aviv. In 1942, it was joined with the bus company United Sharon. In 1951, Egged merged with the Northern Shahar bus company and the Southern Drom Yehuda bus company, creating a national public transportation network. In 1961, Egged merged with the Hamekasher bus company of Jerusalem. The name Egged (lit. 'Union') was given to the cooperative by the Israeli poet Hayim Nahman Bialik.

During the wars of 1956, 1967 and 1973, Egged buses and drivers helped to reinforce the logistics system of the Israel Defense Forces (IDF) and drove soldiers and food to the battlefields. Some buses also served as ambulances to transport injured soldiers and civilians. In several cases, Egged buses were also used to facilitate the expulsion of Palestinian residents of the West Bank, such as from the villages of Qalqilyah, Imwas, Yalo and Bayt Nuba during the Six-Day War. According to Israeli historian Adam Raz, Egged's Head of Traffic Department during the war, Yaakov Mali, was quoted in an archival document as saying, "He (Kfar Sava Mayor Ze'ev Geller) ordered 40 buses from me to expel the residents of Qalqilyah to the Jordan crossings," testifying that he replied he only accepted orders from the IDF. Geller responded that there was "a historic opportunity to get rid of as many Arabs as possible and that at that very moment, the IDF was blowing up houses in Qalqilyah."

In late 2002, Egged sued the Palestinian National Authority and its chairman Yasser Arafat for compensation of damages and loss of income due to terrorist attacks and suicide bombings on buses during the Second Intifada, as the attacks had deterred passengers from taking buses. On February 3, 2003, the Tel Aviv District Court ruled that Arafat had to pay Egged NIS 52 million in damages for the loss of one year's income and NIS 100,000 in court expenses.

Despite deregulation attempts by the Israeli prime minister Benjamin Netanyahu, Egged is still Israel's largest bus company, is subsidized by the government, and still controls most of the inter-city bus lines in Israel. Netanyahu's attempts were cut short by a bus strike that brought the country to a halt. However, in recent years, bus service has begun to be operated by smaller bus companies such as Dan, Kavim, Superbus, Connex and others. In 2005, Egged and the Israeli Government reached an agreement under which by the year 2015 subsidization will be reduced to specific sectors, the disabled, soldiers and students, and for certain equipment.

In 2019, members voted overwhelmingly to convert Egged into a company from a worker cooperative. Had its members voted to not convert its ownership structure, the government could have cancelled an operating agreement it signed with Egged in November 2018, tender out its routes, and imposed various sanctions until it decided to convert into a company.

=== History of attacks ===
Egged buses and their passengers have been victims of acts of terrorism quite a few times, including:

- Fajja bus attacks - November 30, 1947: An attack by Palestinian terrorists on an Egged bus traveling from Netanya to Jerusalem, in which five bus passengers were killed.
- Ma'ale Akrabim massacre (Scorpions’ Pass Massacre)- March 17, 1954: a shooting attack by Palestinian Terrorists in which 12 passengers of an Egged bus were killed in Akrabbim.
- Coastal road massacre - March 11, 1978: Palestinian terrorists took over an Egged bus, and at the end of a struggle between the terrorists and the police, 35 of the bus passengers were killed.
- Tel Aviv–Jerusalem bus 405 suicide attack - July 6, 1989: A Palestinian terrorist named Abed al-Hadi Ghanem, funded by Palestinian Islamic Jihad, derailed an Egged bus on route 405 into an abyss near Kiryat Ye'arim. 16 people died, including an American and 2 Canadians.
- Haifa bus 37 suicide bombing - March 5, 2003: a suicide attack by a Hamas terrorist on Moriah Avenue in the Achoza neighborhood in Haifa. 17 people were killed in the attack.
- Second Intifada: During the Second Intifada, suicide attacks on buses were a major form of terrorism, resulting in hundreds of deaths.

Flag of Egged

== Bus fleet ==
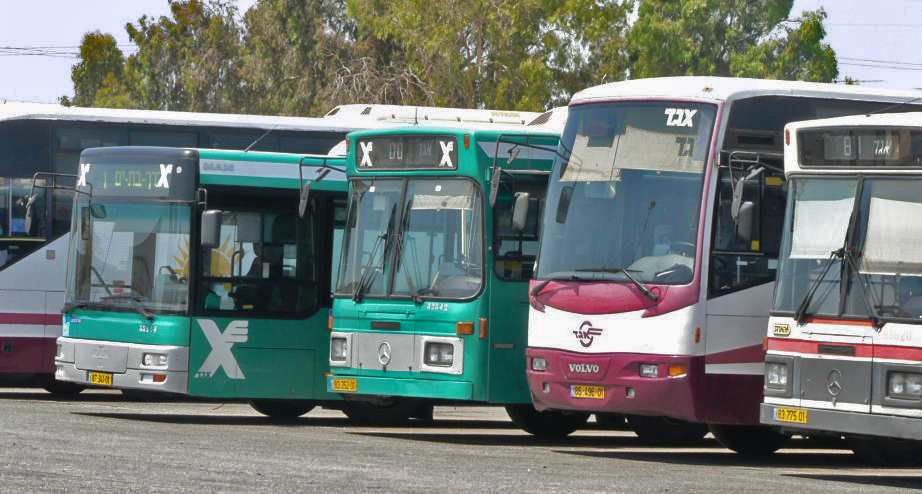
Parked Egged buses at a bus depot

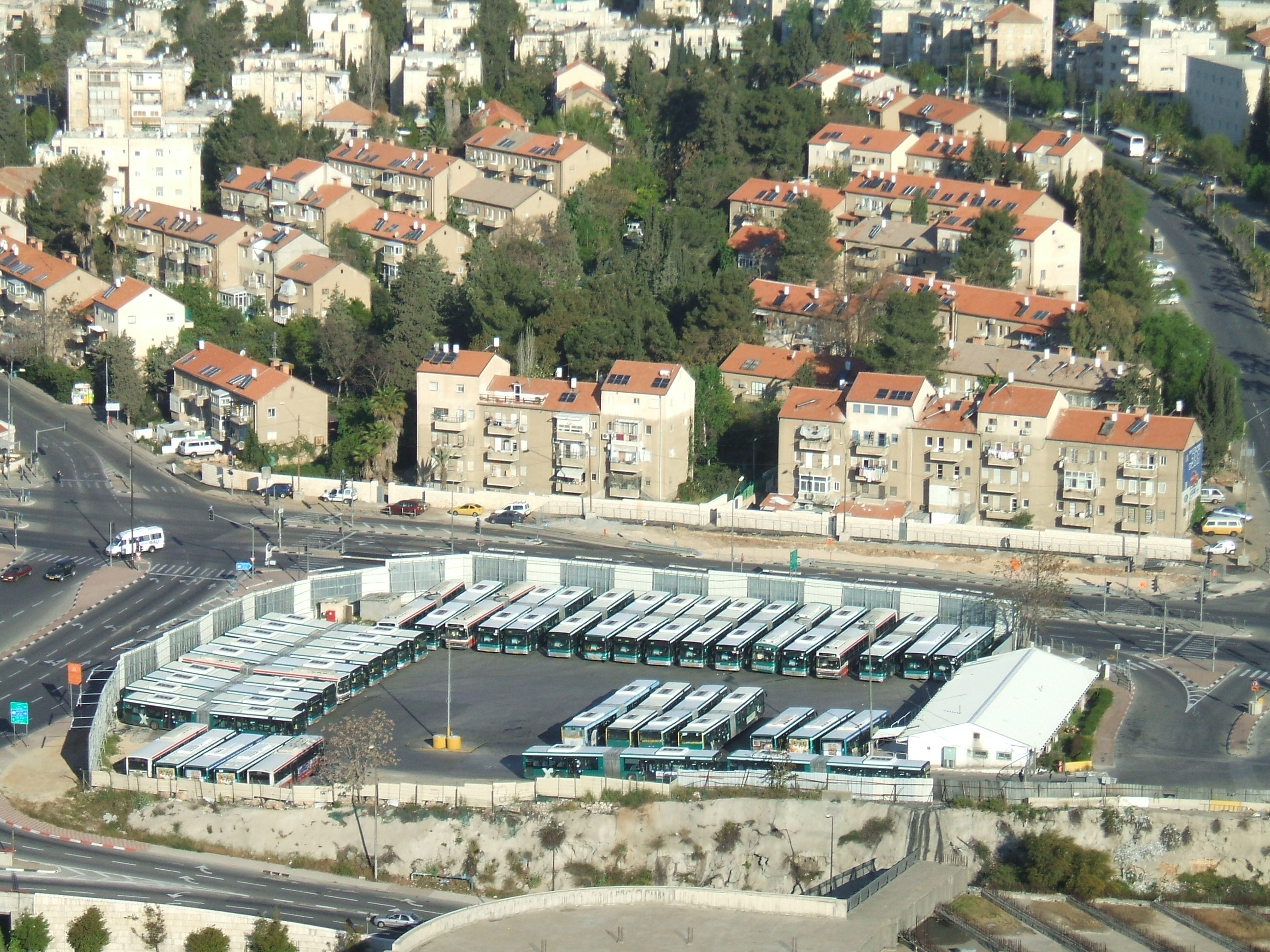
Egged bus depot, Kiryat Moshe, Jerusalem

Egged's bus fleet includes a wide variety of bus models of Mercedes-Benz, Volvo, MAN, Golden Dragon, Higer, BYD, and Yutong, many buses built are finished by local Israel bus manufacturers Haargaz and Merkavim. Historically, the company also extensively used buses by Leyland, Neoplan, Jonckheere, International, Fiat and more.

== International ventures ==
Egged has purchased 51% of the Bulgarian Trans-Triumph bus company, which runs service to cities such as Varna and Sofia, as well as airport and tour buses for approximately €4 million. Egged, through its affiliated company, is responsible for the operation of half the public transportation in the city of Varna, the second-largest city in Bulgaria with about half a million residents. Egged also formed a joint venture company with Rousse municipality called Egged Rousse JSC which operates the public transport in the city of Rousse.

Egged operates some 1,500 buses in Poland, where it owns the Polish bus company Mobilis it acquired for €4 million in 2006. The company operates some metropolitan bus routes, including exclusive franchises in Warsaw, Kraków and Bartoszyce. Mobilis in Warsaw operate 215 buses for public transportation and serves around 40 routes daily. Also, it uses Scania coach for the football team Legia Warszawa and some other buses for special transport and tourism.

Egged Bus Services (EBS) also holds an eight-year contract (with an option for an additional two years) worth about €500 million, for public transport in the region Waterland in the Netherlands, starting December 2011. The contract drew opposition from local activist groups who accuse Egged of supporting Israel's settlements policy in the West Bank, and consider the company's winning the tender as indirect Dutch support for Israel's settlements policy, according to reports by Radio Netherlands Worldwide. Egged's Dutch subsidiary denies being involved in politics.

== Jerusalem Light Rail ==
In October 2010, Egged bought Veolia Transport's share in the Jerusalem Light Rail after a deal with the Dan Bus Company fell through. However, in March 2018 it was revealed that Egged will be prohibited from tendering to operate the light rail over competition concerns.

== Tel Aviv Light Rail ==
Egged has been awarded the tender to operate and maintain the Tel Aviv Red Line from October 2021 by the NTA Metropolitan Mass Transit System Ltd. tenders committee. The winning bid was from the Tevel consortium controlled by Egged (51%) with Chinese companies Shenzhen Metro (30%) and CCECC (19%). The tender win is subject to approval by the Israel Antitrust Authority.

== "Mehadrin" routes ==
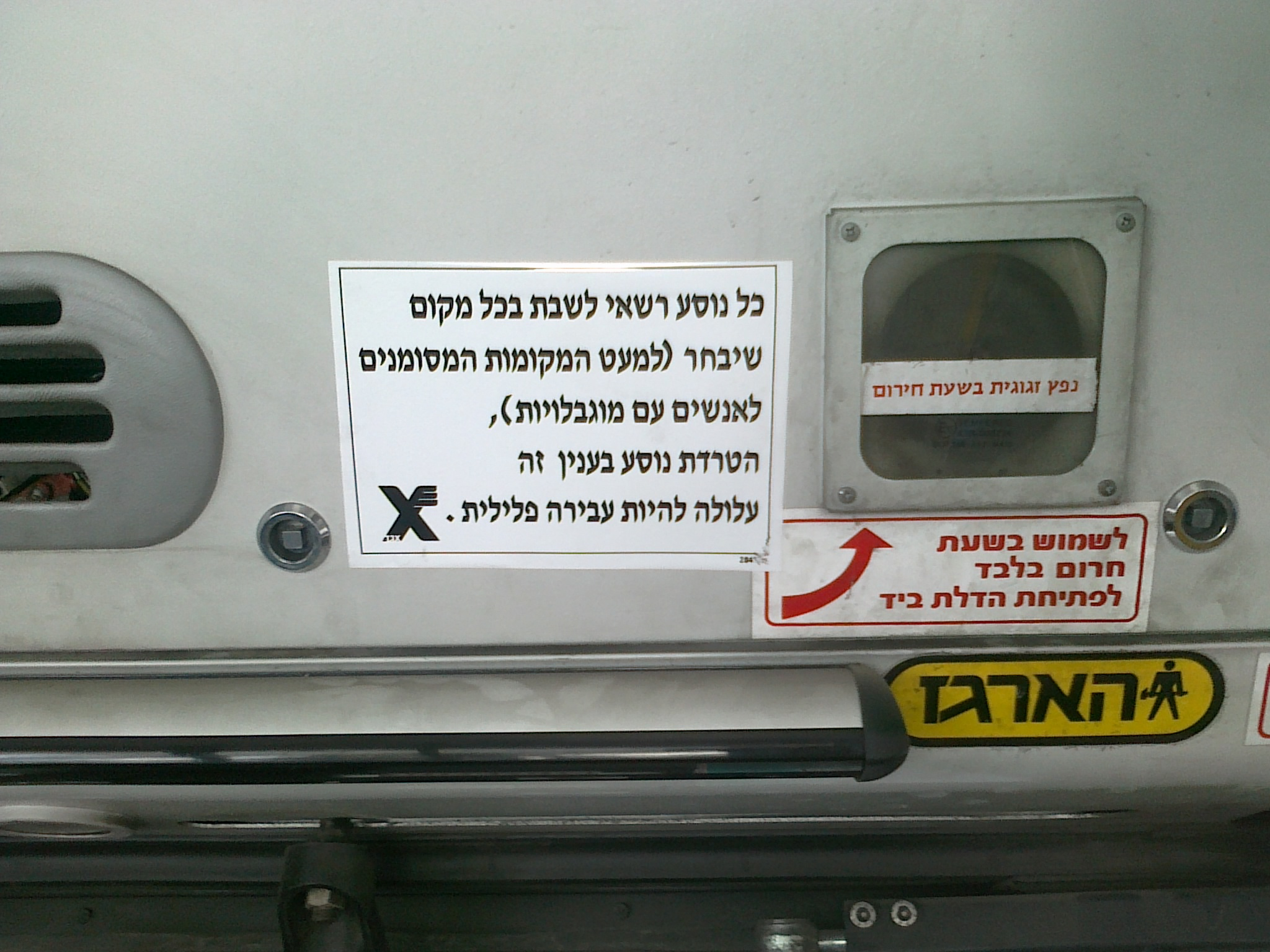
Notice on Egged buses: "Passengers are free to sit wherever they choose (except for seats designated for disabled persons). Harassment in this regard may constitute a criminal offense."

From the late 1990s until January 2011, Egged operated gender-segregated lines, commonly called Mehadrin bus lines mainly running in and/or between major Haredi population centers. In these buses, men sat at the front and women were expected to wear "modest dress." The "mehadrin" lines were criticized after a woman, Miriam Shear, was allegedly assaulted for refusing to give up her seat to a male passenger and move to the back of the bus. In January 2011, the Israeli High Court of Justice ruled that forced separation of men and women on buses was illegal but allowed voluntary separation for a one-year experimental period. The court, accepting the recommendations of an investigation committee, ordered the removal of signs designating buses as segregated and the installation of new signs informing passengers of their right to sit wherever they wanted.

The Haredi public has requested to operate private bus lines but they were blocked by the transportation ministry.

== Tourism ==
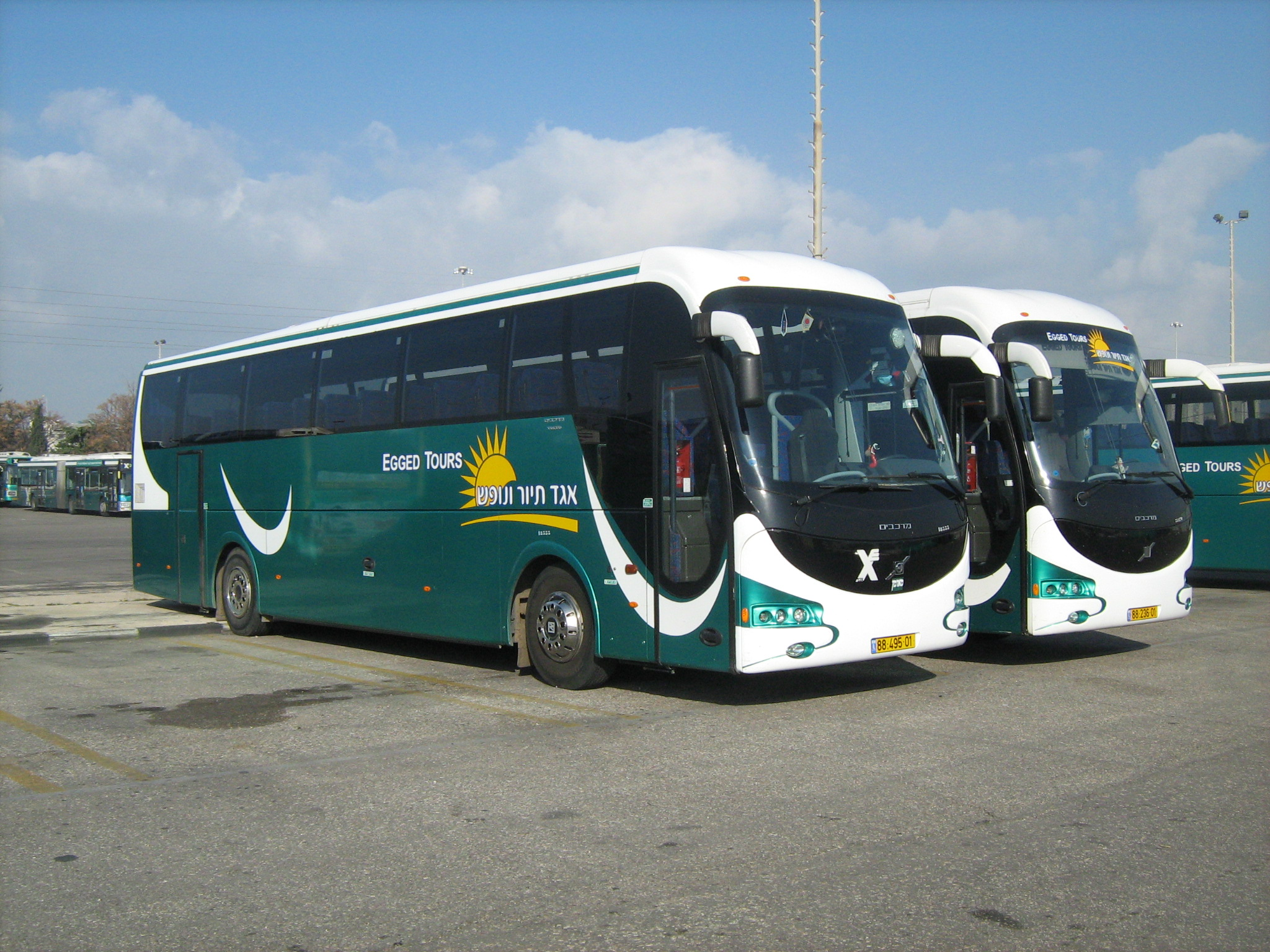
Egged tourist buses

In later years Egged Bus Cooperative has expanded its services, through its subsidiary company Egged Tours, by offering organized trips abroad for Israelis as well as daily tours in Israel for tourists. Egged Tours is an IATA licensed company which operates as a wholesale company for organized tours all over the world and Israel for groups and individuals. Its services include flights, organized tours, accommodation and trips all year round.

== Criticism ==
=== Involvement in Israeli settlements ===
On 12 February 2020, the United Nations published a database of companies doing business related in the West Bank, including East Jerusalem, as well as in the Golan Heights. Egged was listed on the database on account of its activities in Israeli settlements in these occupied territories, which the UN considers to be illegal.

== See also ==
- List of Egged bus routes in Israel
- List of bus routes in Jerusalem
- Economy of Israel
- Transportation in Israel
- Egged Ta'avura
