= Dan Bus Company =

Israeli bus company

Dan Bus Company דן חברה לתחבורה ציבורית

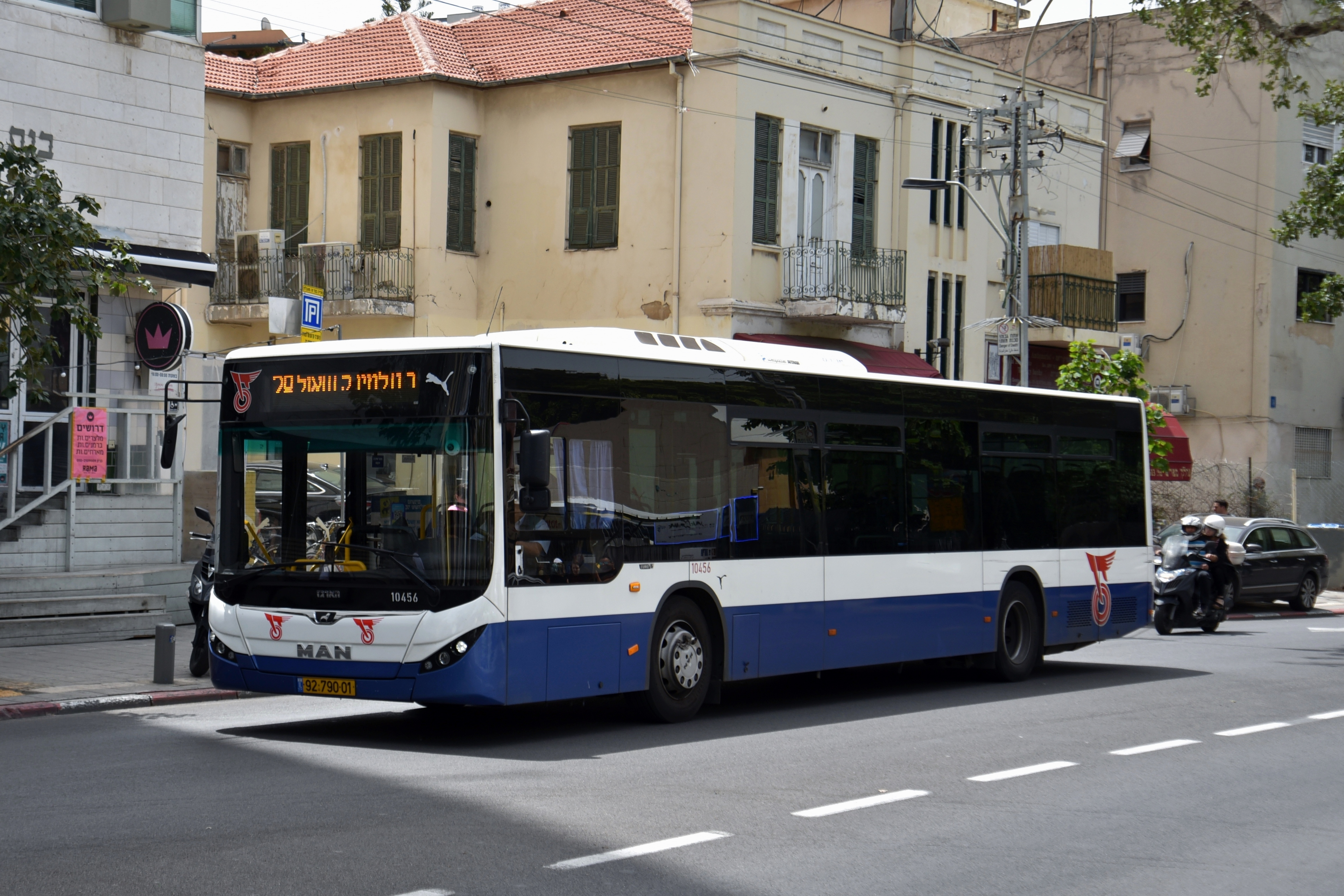
- Founded: Mandatory Palestine; 1945; 81 years ago
- Headquarters: Tel Aviv
- Service area: Gush Dan
- Service type: bus service
- Annual ridership: 152,200,000 (not including subsidiaries)
- Website: English

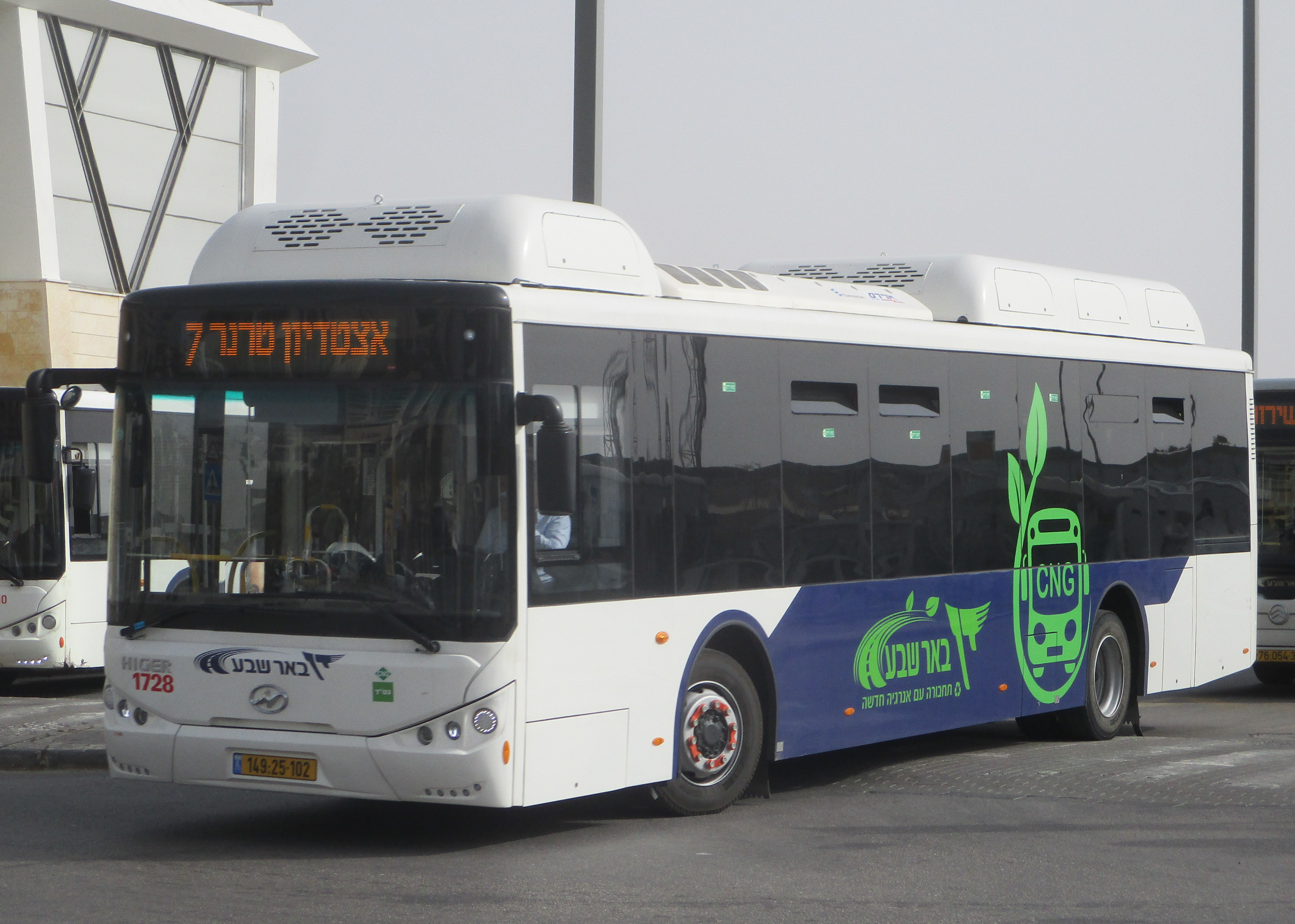
A Dan bus

Dan Bus Company (Hebrew: דן חברה לתחבורה ציבורית) is an Israeli bus company based in Tel Aviv. It operates local bus service in the Tel Aviv metropolitan area and Be'er Sheva.

Dan operates 1,200 buses and has 2,400 employees. It transports approximately over 600,000 passengers daily. Combined with its southern subsidiaries, its fleet numbers 2,500.

== History ==
=== 1945–1999: Cooperative Tel Aviv bus company ===
Dan was founded as a cooperative on 1 December 1945, from the merger of two companies, Galei HaMaavir and Ihud Regev. In the sense that most city lines were provided by Egged, Dan competed fellow cooperative with Egged. Same-route shared taxis competed with Dan.

=== 2000–2019: Demutualization and national expansion ===
Dan demutualised, becoming a limited company in May 2002. In 2009, 23.5% of all Israeli bus travelers used Dan's lines. Dan provides bus service six days a week. From Friday afternoon until after Sunset Saturday night, service is suspended in observance of the Jewish Sabbath. Dan buses run until approximately 23:30 p.m. and resume service in the early morning hours.

In September 2009, Dan and Veolia reached an agreement on the purchase of Veolia's share in the Jerusalem Light Rail for $15–20 million. In October 2010, Veolia reneged and said it would sell its stake to Egged. As a result, Dan sued Veolia.

Since 2013, Dan was contracted to operate the Metronit bus rapid transport system in Haifa and the Krayot suburbs until October 15, 2021 where Dan was replaced with Superbus as the Metronit’s operator.

In 2015, Dan established the subsidiary Dan BaDarom (Hebrew: דן בדרום; Dan South) to compete on tenders in southern Israel. In May 2015, Dan BaDarom won a tender to operate bus routes in the Northern Negev, Ashkelon, Kiryat Malakhi, Kiryat Gat, Sderot, Netivot and Ofakim. Dan Be'er Sheva (Hebrew: דן באר שבע) (DBS) was created in January 2016 to operate the urban bus routes in Beersheba. On February 12, 2016, Dan BaDarom started to operate the bus routes in the Northern Negev except the intracity service in Ashkelon. The operation starting date of the intracity service in Ashkelon was delayed from May 2016 to July 2016 because of bad service in Northern Negev routes. On July 1, 2016, Dan BaDarom started to operate the intracity service in Ashkelon. In November 2016, Dan BaDarom replaced Metrodan Beersheba, which was shut down.

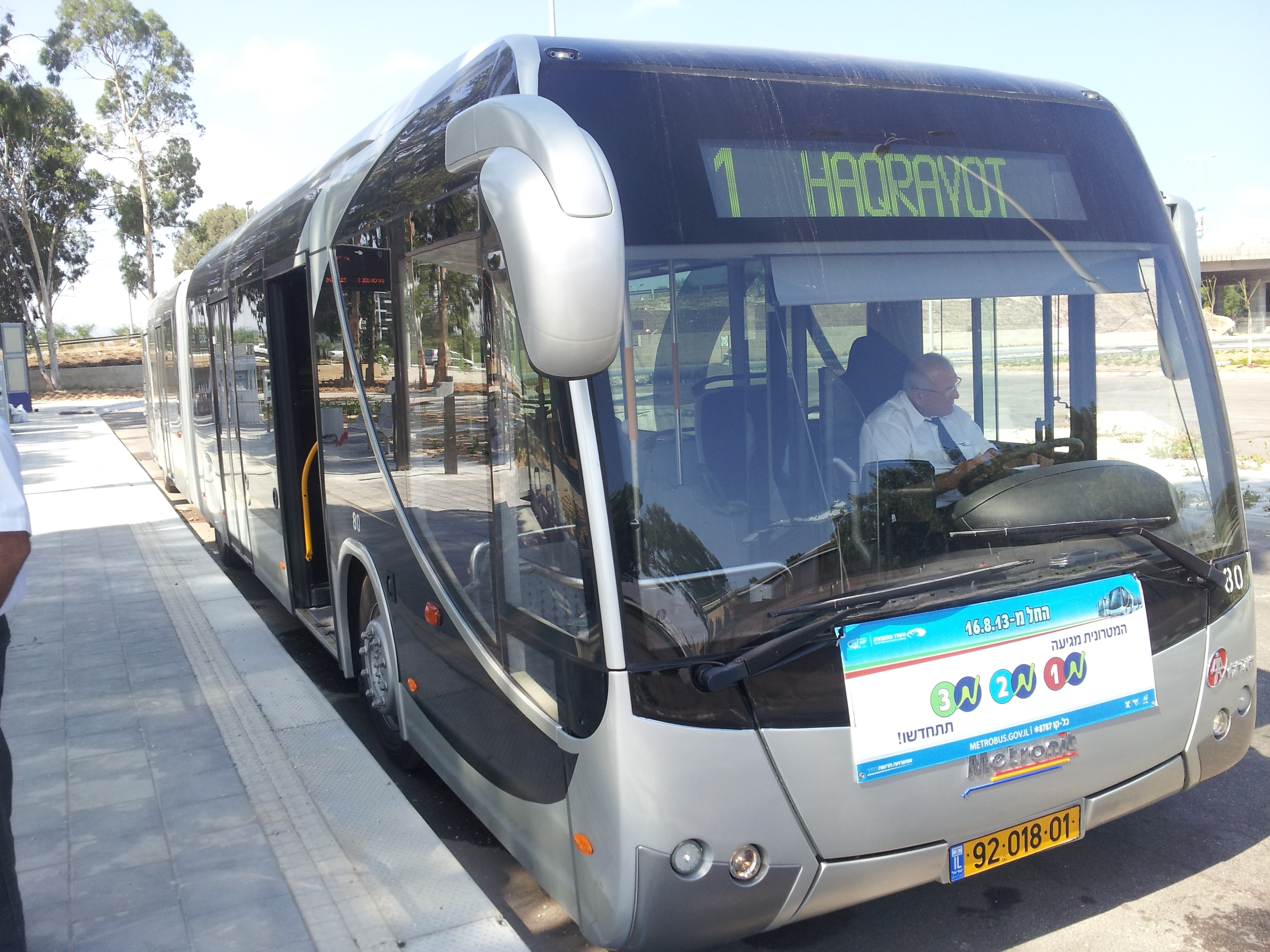
A bus of the Haifa Metronit, operated by Dan

=== 2020–: International expension ===
In May 2022, Dan group purchased TST, the bus operator in Setúbal area (Portugal) from Arriva.

== See also ==
- Kavim
- Transport in Tel Aviv
