= Electra Afikim =

Israeli bus company

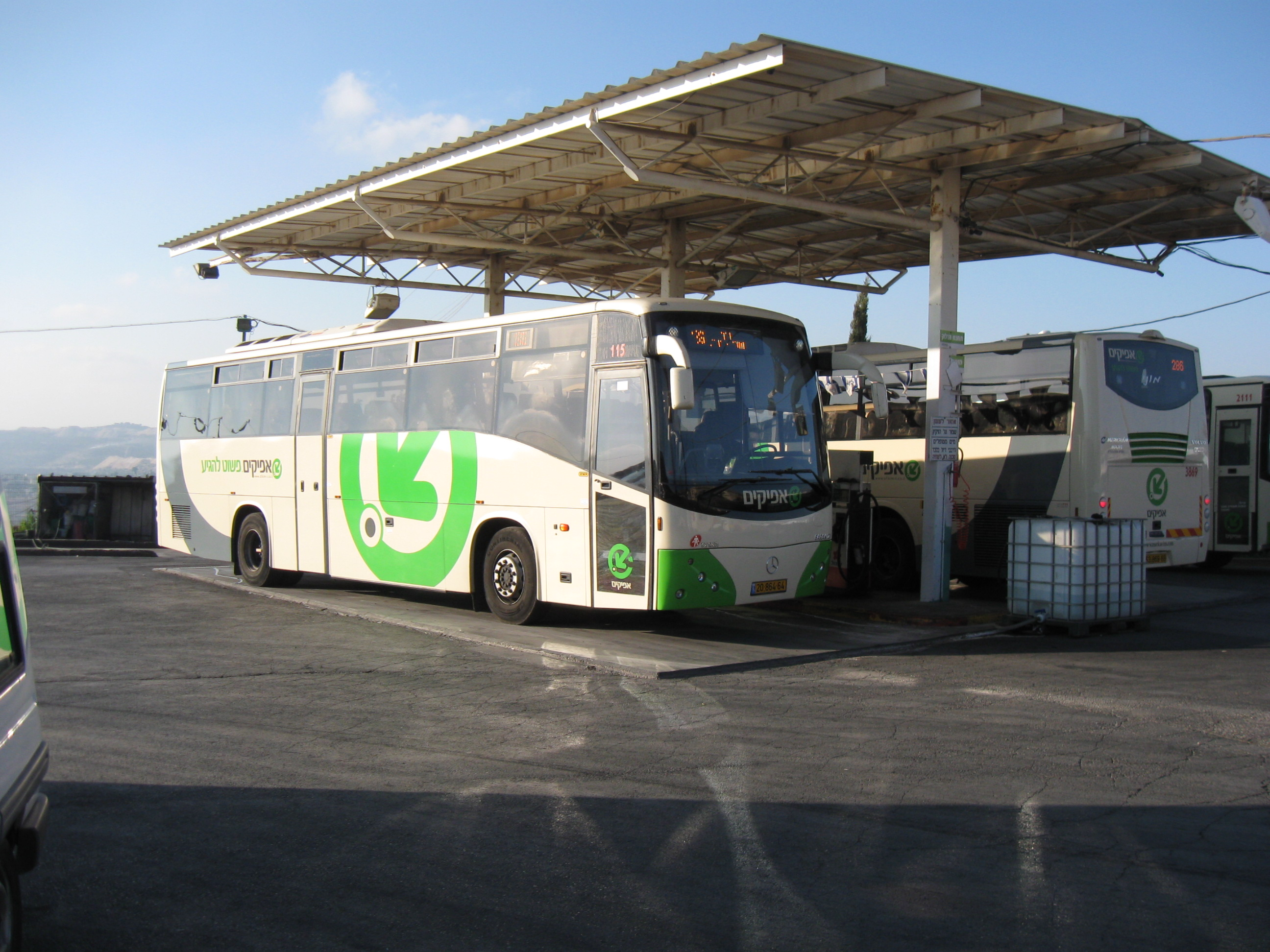
- Mercedes OC500 bodied Man Barak 21 at the Ariel bus terminal
- Founded: 2008
- Service area: Gush Dan; Rosh HaAyin; Sharon plain Samaria
- Service type: bus service
- Routes: 31 (January 2014)
- Annual ridership: 53,600,000

Electra Afikim (Hebrew: אלקטרה-אפיקים, lit. 'lit. routes'), known also as Afikim, is an Israeli bus company that operates on routes connecting the Gush Dan and Sharon plain regions with the western Samaria region of the West Bank, as well as lines in Ashdod, Yavne, Rosh HaAyin and other locations.

== History ==
Afikim was founded in 2008 and was part of Sela Holdings. It began operating on September 1, 2009.

=== 2010s: Expansion ===
In March 2013, the company began operating "Palestinian only" buses and bus lines for Palestinian workers commuting from the West Bank to jobs in Israel, following complaints from Jewish settlers.

Afikim also purchased Connex's activity in Israel in 2013, significantly expanding its operations, and as of November 2014, operated about 145 routes and a fleet of 350 buses, with plans to purchase a further 200 for the Ashdod–Yavne–Tel Aviv sector. In 2015, Afikim won the tender for cluster of Petah Tikva and Rosh HaAyin which includes all intracity service in Petah Tikva and Rosh HaAyin.

On May 6, 2016, Afikim started to operate the intracity and intercity services in Rosh HaAyin and line 47 from Giv'at Shmuel to Petah Tikva. On February 13, 2017, Afikim started to operate line 485 from Jerusalem to Ben Gurion Airport.

=== 2020s: Electra Afikim ===
In 2020, Electra Ltd acquired Afikim, Egged Taavura and Amonon Mesilot and rebranded Electra Afikim.

In 2021, Electra Afikim acquired Egged Taavura. Since, it has merged its operations and branding into Electra Afikim. Electra Afikim kept the Egged Taavura company active on paper for as long as it had contracts with the Israeli government.

== Ridership by sector ==
In 2017, each sector had the following annual ridership:

Sector	Ridership (in millions)
Petah Tikva and Rosh HaAyin internal	21
Ashdod internal	15
Ashdod – Yavne – Tel Aviv	10
Samaria	5
Jerusalem – Bnei Brak	3

== See also ==
- Transportation in Israel
- List of companies operating in West Bank settlements
