= Tevel Metro =

Israeli public transport operator

- Native name: תבל מטרו
- Type: Privately held company
- Industry: Transport
- Founded: 3 March 2017
- Headquarters: Israel
- Area served: Gush Dan
- Services: Operation of the Red, Green and Purple lines of the Tel Aviv Light Rail
- Owner: Egged Group
- Number of employees: 500 (2025)
- Parent: Egged, Shenzhen Metro, China Civil Engineering Construction Corporation

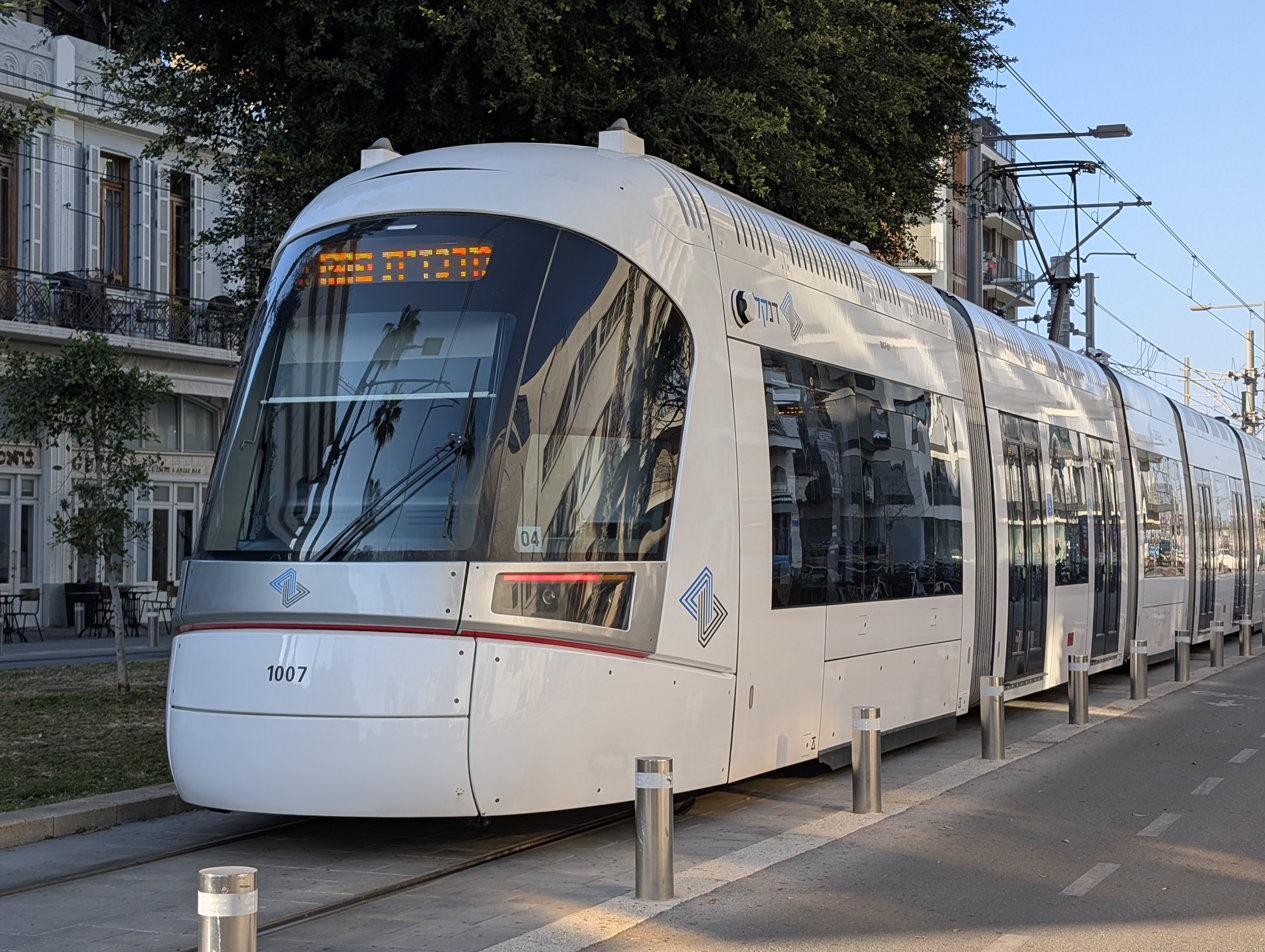
Red Line in Jerusalem Boulevard, Jaffa, 2025

Tevel Metro (Hebrew: תבל מטרו) is a privately held company operating the Red Line of the Tel Aviv Light Rail since it started operating in August 2023. The company was established in 2017 as a corporate group containing the Israeli bus company Egged (51%), the Chinese Shenzhen Metro (30%) and China Civil Engineering Construction Corporation (19%). It is part of Egged Group.

The company won the tenders to operate all 3 lines of the Dankal system; First, it won the Red Line tender in August 2017 for a term of a decade, with an option to extend for additional 6 years. Then, on 12 March 2025, it secured the tenders to operate the Green and Purple lines for a decade, with an option to extend for an additional decade.

== See also ==
- Cfir Light Rail
