= Transport in Bnei Brak =

Transport in Bnei Brak occupies a central location within the Gush Dan (Israel's main metropolitan centre). It has an important role in transport throughout the region.

== Buses ==
Across the Gush Dan, metropolitan local bus services are operated by the Dan Bus Company. Many buses traverse Bnei Brak due to its central location, East of Tel Aviv, west of Petah Tikva, north of Ramat Gan, and south of Ramat HaSharon

== Light Rail ==
The Tel Aviv Light Rail Red Line will pass through Bnei Brak as an underground light rail system, expected to be operational in 2022. It is planned to be built underground as it passes through the city.

== Rail ==
The Bnei Brak Railway Station opened in 1949 but was closed during the 1990s for refurbishment. It was reopened, and rebuilt in 2000. The station is, however, a fair distance from the city centre and so less accessible. The station is served by trains on the suburban Kfar Saba to Rishon LeZion line.

== Road ==
Bnei Brak's eastern border is demarcated by Highway 4, to the west the city is easily accessible from the Ayalon Highway.
