= Cfir Light Rail =

- Native name: כפיר רכבת קלה
- Formerly: TransJerusalem J-Net
- Industry: Transport
- Founded: 2019
- Headquarters: Clal Center, Jerusalem, Israel
- Area served: Jeruslem
- Services: Operation of the Red Line of the Jerusalem Light Rail, and construction of the Green Line
- Parent: Construcciones y Auxiliar de Ferrocarriles, Shapir Engineering and Industry

Cfir Light Rail (Hebrew: כפיר רכבת קלה), also known by the brand name Cfir, is a privately held company operating the Red Line of the Jerusalem Light Rail since April 2021, replacing the CityPass consortsium.

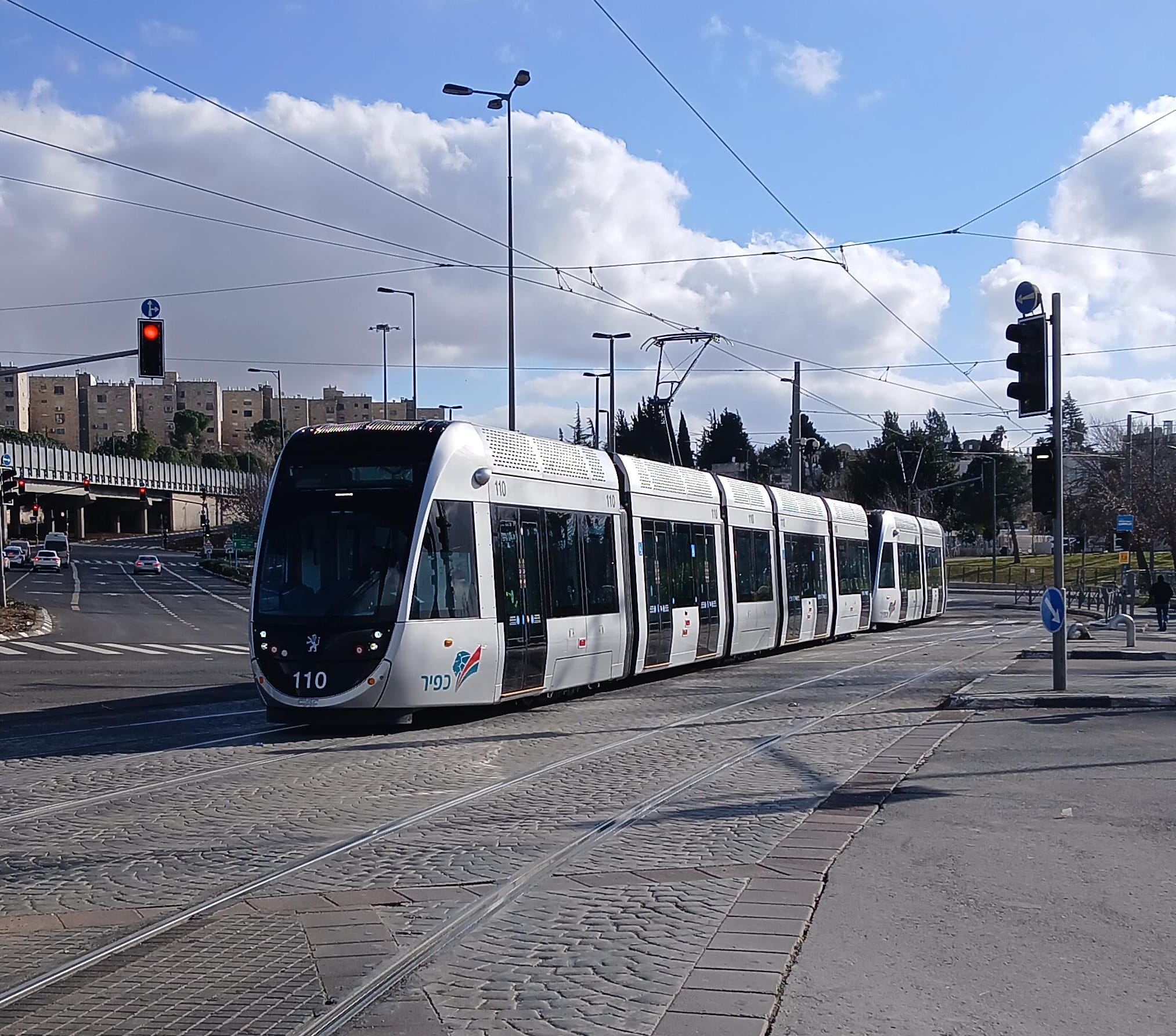
CAF Urbos 100 tram of the Red Line, bearing the Cfir branding, 2025

Cfir is jointly owned by the Spanish railway company Construcciones y Auxiliar de Ferrocarriles (CAF) and the Israeli Shapir Engineering and Industry. The name "Cfir" is a portmanteau of the parent companies' names – CAF and Shapir – and also means "lion cub" (כפיר) in Hebrew, which symbolizes the city of Jerusalem, whose municipal seal features the biblical Lion of Judah.

== History ==
TransJerusalem J-Net (branded as "Cfir" and later renamed Cfir Light Rail) was established by Shapir Engineering and CAF for the purpose of operating the Red Line and the construction and operation of the Green Line, after securing a comprehensive 2019 tender for operating and extending the Red Line, and the construction of the following Green Line.

On 16 April 2021, it began operating the Red Line, replacing the CityPass company, which had built and operated the line following its win in the original build-operate-transfer tender process and the Government of Israel's decision to acquire the Red Line franchise in February 2020.

The company's customer service center is located at the Clal Center on Jaffa Road.

== See also ==
- Tevel Metro
