= 2024 Beersheba bus station shooting =

2024 terror attack in Israel

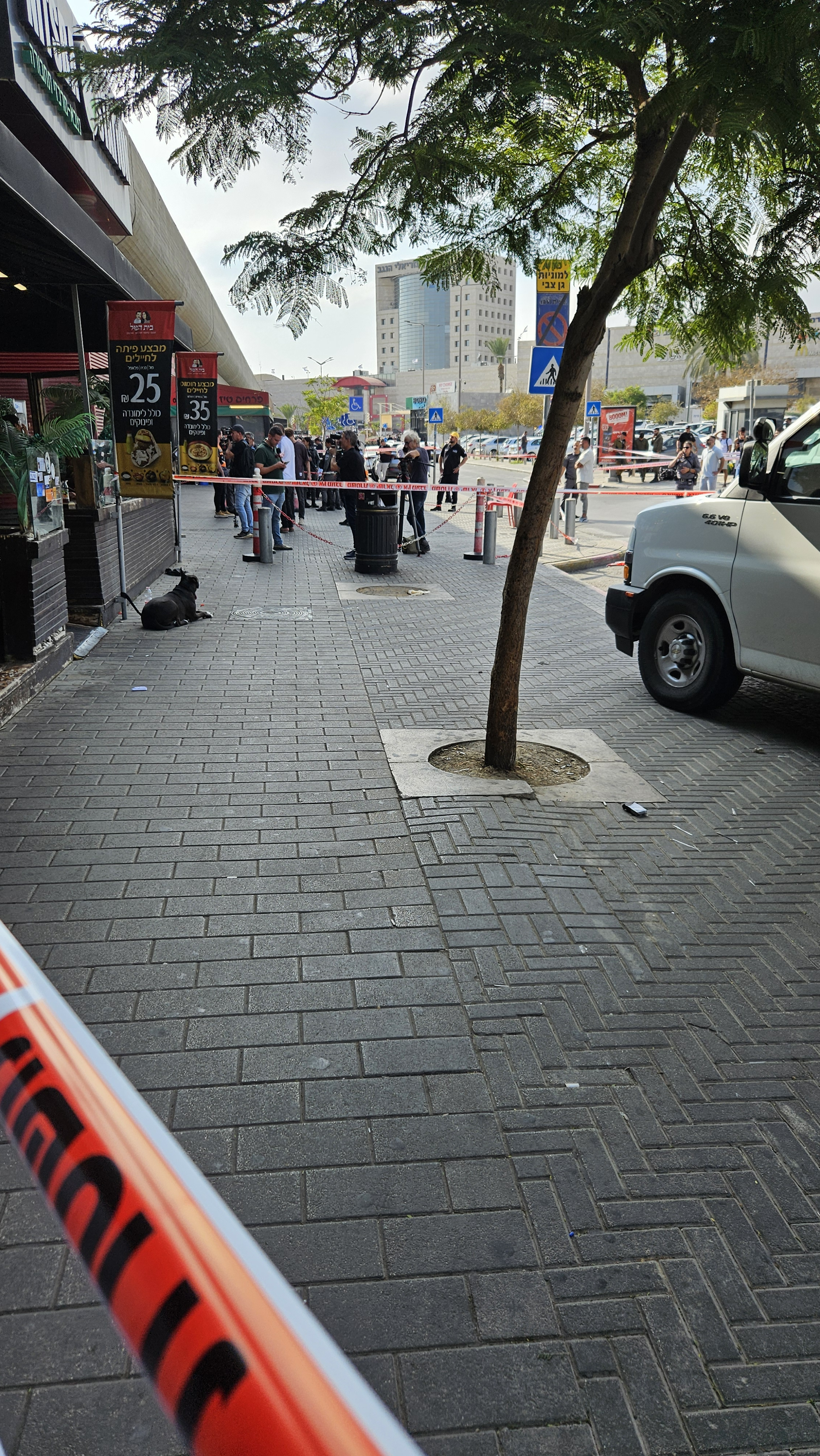
- Scene of the crime with the area taped off by police
- Location: 31°14′33″N 34°47′48″E; Beersheba, Israel
- Date: 6 October 2024; 14:30 P.M. (GMT+3)
- Attack type: Mass shooting and stabbing
- Deaths: 2 (including the perpetrator)
- Injuries: 13
- Perpetrator: Ahmad Said Suliman al-Uqbi

On 6 October 2024, a gunman carried out a shooting and stabbing attack in Beersheba's central station. Thirteen Israelis were wounded and one was killed. The gunman was killed by Israeli security forces.

== Background ==
Tensions between Israel and the occupied West Bank steadily increased following 7 October 2023 attacks, which killed about 1,200 people including 815 civilians. As of 23 September 2024, over 41,000 Palestinian civilians and approximately 1,000 Israeli civilians have been killed in the Gaza war.

Five days before the attack, there had been another attack on 1 October in Jaffa, Tel Aviv where two Hamas gunmen opened fire, killing seven and wounding 17 more, before being killed by IDF troops and an armed civilian.

== Attack ==
One person was killed and 13 others were injured in the attack, which took place inside McDonald's at Beersheba's central bus station. Medical service Magen David Adom reported that paramedics treated nine individuals on-site for various injuries. Border Police Sgt. Shira Suslik, 19, from Beersheba, died from injuries caused by the attack. MDA indicated that two individuals in serious condition, four in moderate condition, and two with minor injuries were being transferred to Soroka Medical Center in Beersheba.

== Perpetrator ==
The assailant was identified as Ahmad Said Suliman al-Uqbi, a 29-year-old Bedouin resident of the unrecognised village of Uqbi near Hura, who had a criminal record and was related to the perpetrator of the 2015 Beersheba bus station shooting, Muhanad al-Uqbi.

== See also ==
- Beersheba shooting
  - 2015 Beersheba bus station shooting
- Beersheba bus bombings
