= 2015 Beersheba bus station shooting =

2015 terrorist attack in Israel

Beersheba bus station shooting
- Part of the 2015–2016 wave of violence in Israeli-Palestinian conflict
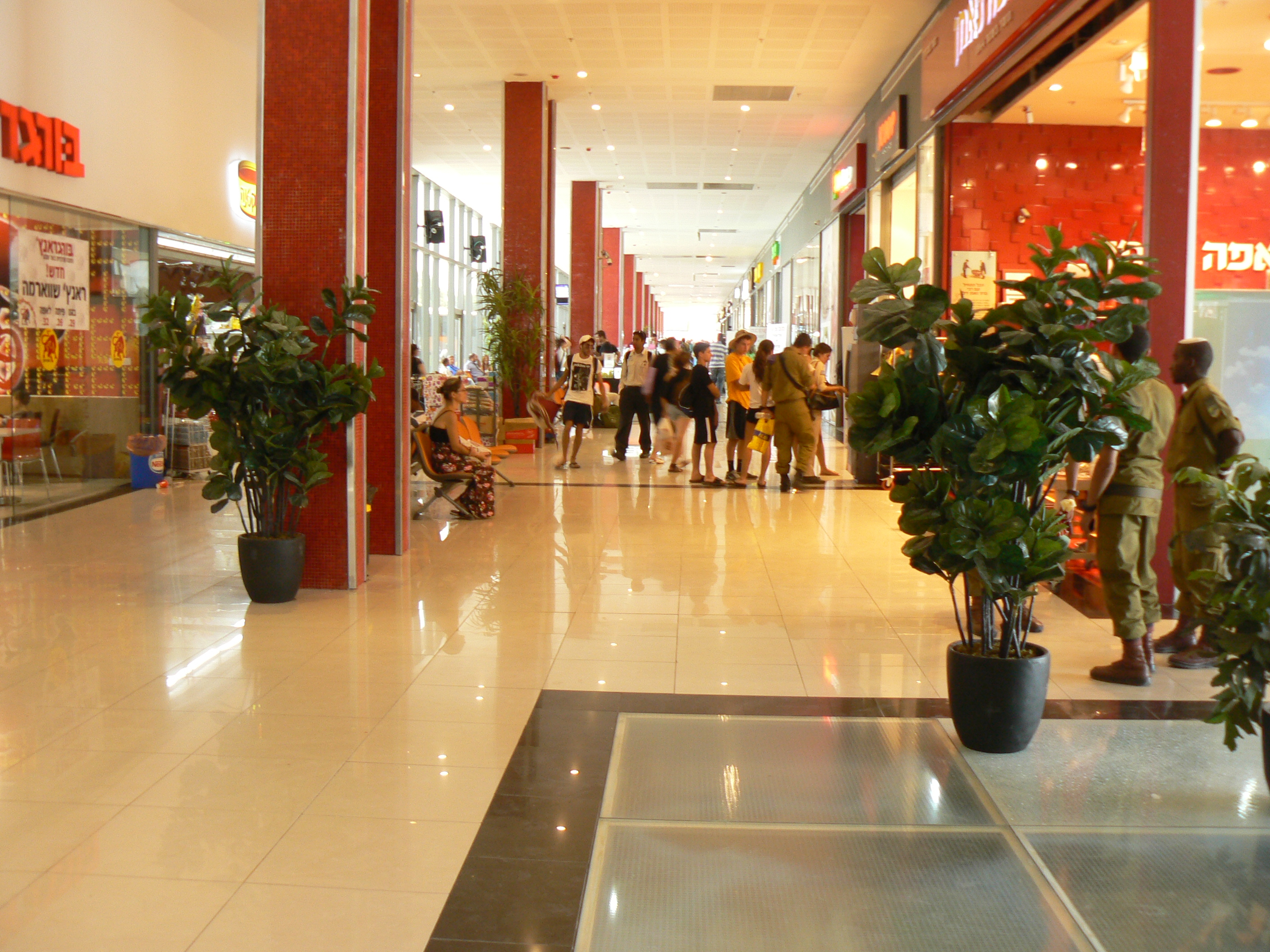

- The attack site
- Native name: הפיגוע בתחנה המרכזית של באר שבע (2015)
- Location: 31°14′33″N 34°47′48″E; Beersheba, Israel
- Date: 18 October 2015; 11 years ago
- Attack type: Mass shooting
- Weapons: Pistol, IMI Galil
- Deaths: 3 (soldier, the perpetrator, civilian mistaken for second gunman)
- Injuries: 11
- Perpetrator: Muhand al-Okabi

On 18 October 2015, a gunman shot and killed 19-year-old Israeli soldier Omri Levy in a bus station in Beersheba. After killing the soldier, he took his automatic rifle and fired into a crowd. When more security officers appeared, the gunman fled, but was killed by security personnel.

A 29-year-old Eritrean asylum seeker, Haftom Zarhum was mistaken for a second attacker. He was shot eight times by police and was kicked and beaten by four Israelis as he lay wounded, while bystanders shouted profanities at him. Graphic footage of the lynching was filmed by a bystander and spread on social media.

At least eleven people, including Zarhum, who died of his wounds a few hours later, and four police officers, were hospitalized. The gunman was the first Israeli Bedouin to be involved in an attack against Israelis.

In response to the lynching, Israel's Prime Minister Benjamin Netanyahu warned that citizens should not take the law into their own hands.

== Attack ==
The gunman, armed with a knife and a pistol, used the pistol to shoot a police officer, then grabbed the officer's assault rifle and continued shooting wounding several more police officers, soldiers and civilians. He then attempted to flee but was killed in a shootout with the police.

During the attack, security forces shot Zarhum eight times, mistaking him for a second gunman. Bystanders also mistook him for an attacker and kicked him and shouted abuse at him as he lay wounded. A prison officer who took part in the beating told media that he had seen Zarhum lift his hands towards his head, and attacked him in the belief that he was a terrorist who had not been "neutralized" and that he might have been reaching for a weapon.

== Victims ==
Haftom Zarhum, who was believed to be a second shooter, was killed in the attack after being shot by police and assaulted by Israeli bystanders. An autopsy determined that Zarhum died of gunshot wounds, not of injuries inflicted by the mob.

Twelve people, including Zarhum, who died of his wounds a few hours later, and four police officers, were hospitalized. At least one of the wounded Israeli soldiers, 19-year-old Daniel Harush, was shot and critically injured by a fellow security officers who mistook him for a terrorist. At least four of the injured were police officers.

== Perpetrator ==
Initially, Israeli authorities thought that the attacker had accomplices. Initial Palestinian media reports had misidentified the gunman as one Asam al-Araj of Shuafat.

The gunman was identified by authorities as 21-year-old Muhand al-Okabi (Mohind al-Okbi, Muhannad al-Aqabi, Muhanad al-Uqbi), an Israeli from the Bedouin town of Hura in the Negev. His mother was an immigrant from Gaza who gained citizenship under the Israeli family reunification law after marrying an Israeli citizen. The New York Times describes the involvement of Israeli Bedouin in terrorism as "unusual".

The attacker's cellphone contained photographs of weapons, Hamas militants, and material related to his plan to attack the bus station. According to co-workers, the perpetrator had expressed confidence that ISIS would soon conquer Israel.

The shooter's brother, 20-year-old Omar al-Okabi, allegedly knew that Muhand had acquired a gun and that he had increasingly radical beliefs. He was indicted by the Beersheba Magistrate's Court for failing to prevent his brother from carrying out the attack.

== Investigation ==
Police investigation of the attack found that the contractor operating the bus station did not provide adequate security. The company was required to have eleven guards, but only seven were on duty, and the guards failed to properly screen individuals entering the bus station.

=== Lynching and trial ===
Authorities detained four Israelis, David Moyal, Evyatar Damari, Yaakov Shamba and Ronen Cohen, who were involved in beating Zarhum. According to the footage from the incident, as Zarhum lay helpless on the ground, Moyal moved in and dropped a bench on him. Moyal was then drawn away by the crowd that surrounded Zarhum. Two other men moved in and kicked Zarhum hard in the head and upper body. A fourth man then again dropped a bench on Zarhum.

The prosecution dismissed the defendants' claim of self defense: "the defendants committed serious acts of violence towards the late citizen Haftom Zarhum, who was already shot, wounded and profusely bleeding, from a motive of vengeance and in order to relieve their anger, and not as the defendants claimed from self-defense." In 2018, the prosecution offered a plea bargain to the defendants, downgrading the charge from "causing injury with grave intent", which entails potentially 20 years in prison, to "abuse of a helpless person." Moyal and Damari accepted the offer. In July 2018, Moyal was sentenced to 100 days of community service, eight months of probation, and ordered to pay 2,000 NIS in compensation. and in December Damari was sentenced to four months in prison.

The two others, Yaakov Shamba and Ronen Cohen, took the case to trial. They were tried in the Beersheba District Court for causing injury with grave intent. In July 2020, they were acquitted. The court ruled that their claim that they thought the man was a terrorist was enough to create reasonable doubt for an acquittal.

Early reports said that Zarhum possessed a work visa, but it was later determined that he was an asylum seeker without a residency permit. Despite Zarhum lacking a residency permit, which made his family ineligible for government assistance paid to families of victims of terrorism, Attorney General Yehuda Weinstein recommended that the family be given assistance. The Israeli National Insurance Agency, however, rejected Zarhum's family's claim for compensation because he entered the country illegally.

== Response ==
Israeli Prime Minister Binyamin Netanyahu accused Palestinian leaders of sponsoring social media incitement encouraging young Arabs to attack Israelis, and warned Israelis who witness attacks not to take the law into their own hands, "Someone who witnesses an attack needs to leave the scene and allow security and rescue forces to work.... We're a nation of laws. No one may take the law into their hands."

Leaders of the Israeli Bedouin community condemned the attack. The Mayor of Hura, Mohammed Alnabati, stated: "We utterly and unreservedly condemn this despicable act and reject violence of any sort.... We condemn this act on behalf of the entire Bedouin society and wish to make clear that you cannot be both a terrorist and a citizen of the country; the two are inherently contradictory."

ISIS posted a series of videos praising the shooter, with titles including "Project Behead the Jews", "Message to the Mujahedin in Jerusalem", and urging Muslims to "this jihad against the Jews".

Taleb Abu Arar, Member of Knesset for the United Arab List asserted al-Okbi's "innocence", and demanded that the shooting be investigated "again and again until the truth is uncovered".

The Palestinian Authority honored the attacker as a "shaheed".

== Impact ==
After the attack, Eritreans in Israel said that the killing of the Eritrean bystander was an example of racism.

Two aspects of the attack led to an extended public conversation; the security personnel seen running away from the active shooter, and the bystanders seen kicking and cursing Zarhum mistaken for a second attacker after he had already been shot. A videotape of Zarhum being beaten while lying on the ground bleeding from gunshot wounds shocked Israelis.

The shooting was the subject of the 2016 documentary film Death in the Terminal, directed by Tali Shemesh and Asaf Sudril. The film won prizes at the International Documentary Film Festival Amsterdam and the Ophir Awards, as well as Best Film at DocAviv.

== See also ==
- Beersheba shooting
  - 2024 Beersheba bus station shooting
- Beersheba bus bombings
- African immigration to Israel
- Racism in Israel
