= 2024 Jaffa shooting =

Terrorist attack in Tel Aviv during Gaza war

- Part of the Gaza war
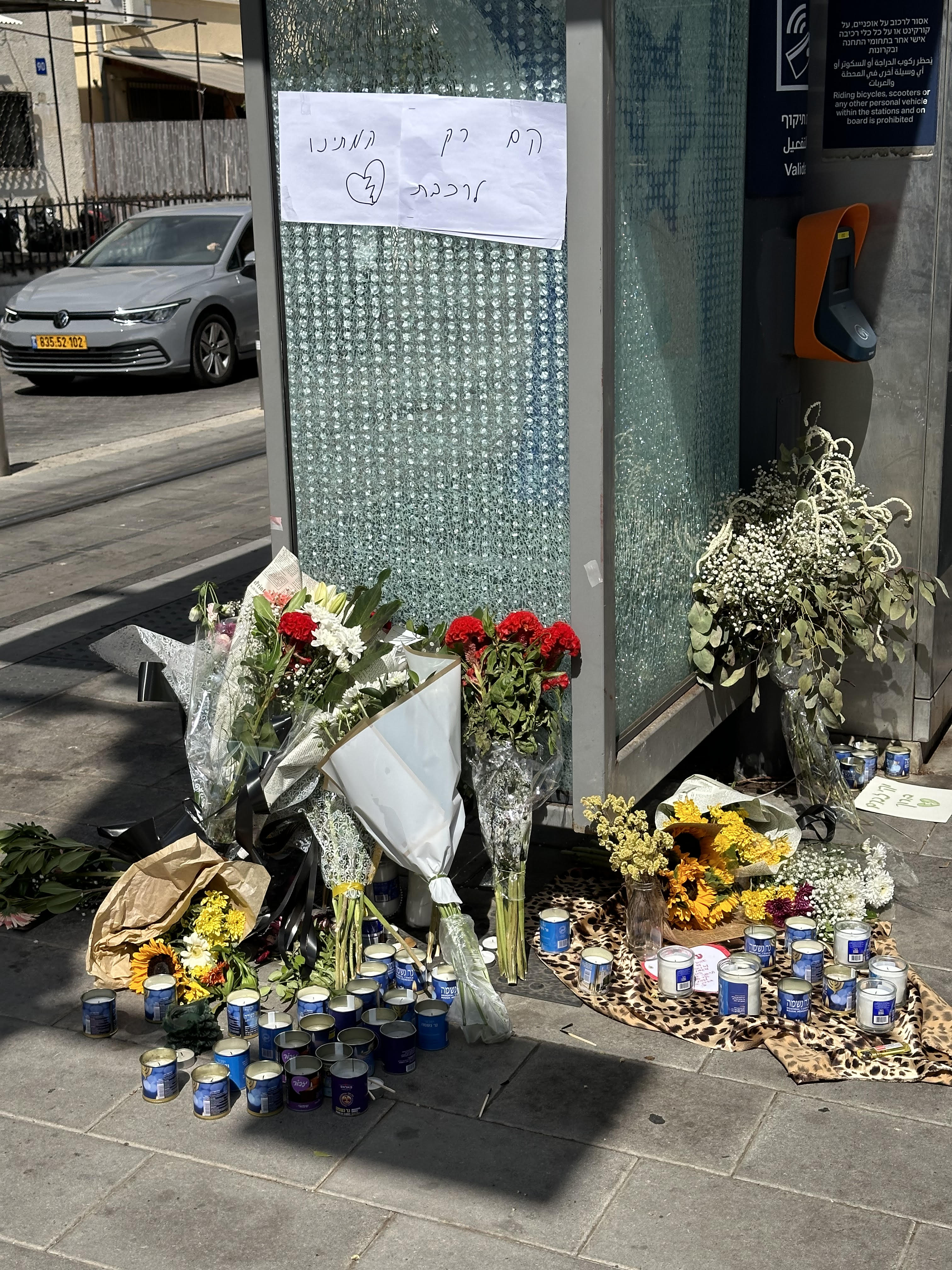
- A makeshift memorial at the site of the attack on the day after the attack

- Location in Israel
- Location: 32°02′46″N 34°45′30″E; Jerusalem Boulevard, Tel Aviv, Israel
- Date: 1 October 2024; 2 years ago 19:00 (IDT)
- Attack type: Mass shooting and knife attack
- Weapons: M16 assault rifle, knife
- Deaths: 7 (+2 perpetrators)
- Injuries: 17 (including an IDF soldier)
- Perpetrator: Hamas: Al-Qassam Brigades
- Assailants: Muhammad Chalaf Sahar Rajab and Hassan Muhammad

On 1 October 2024, two Hamas gunmen carried out an attack in Jaffa, Tel Aviv, Israel. Seven civilians were killed, and seventeen others were injured. The attack ended when the gunmen were shot dead by an armed civilian and a security guard.

== Background ==
Tensions between Israel and the occupied West Bank have steadily increased since the October 7 attacks, which killed about 1,200 people and seized about 251 hostages. Since the attack about 40 Israeli citizens and security forces have been killed in attacks in both Israel and the occupied West Bank.

On 30 November 2023, two Hamas affiliated militants exited a car and traveled to a bus stop by the Ben-Gurion Boulevard in Jerusalem and opened fire, killing three people and wounding others. A responding Israeli civilian; Yuval Castleman drew his personal weapon and killed one of the shooters, before responding IDF troops shot and killed him believing him to be a militant. Castleman had discarded his gun and raised his hands shouting "I'm Israel, do not shoot" before he was shot.

== Attack ==
Prior to the shooting, the two attackers entered the Al-Nuzha Mosque through the women's entrance and stashed their bags in the mosque's bathroom, threatening worshipers not to leave. Members of the congregation, indicated that one of the shooters opened the door with a M16 rifle and shouted at them "Nobody go outside! Anyone who goes out is a dead man!" Once the doors were closed the congregation began to call the police.

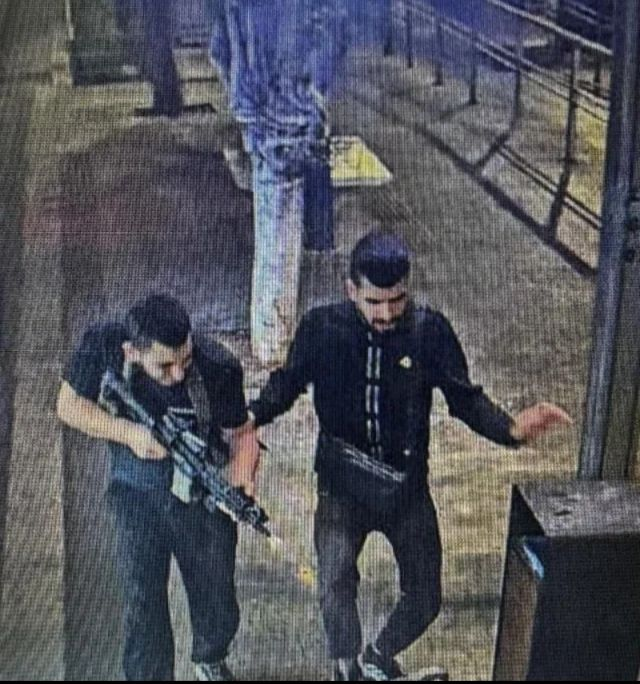
A picture of the two perpetrators during the attack

At approximately 7:00 pm, two men armed with firearms and knives opened fire on pedestrians near the Tel Aviv Light Rail's Erlich Station in Jaffa, injuring several civilians. The Israeli emergency response service, MDA, reported that they had received reports of people injured by gunfire at 7:01 pm.

According to initial reports, there were three locations involved in the attack; Jerusalem Boulevard, Yefet Street, and Gaza Street. An eyewitness at the station claimed that the two men did not appear to be suspicious before the attack, claiming one was carrying an M16 rifle and the other had a polo shirt and pin commemorating the hostages held by Hamas.

A preliminary investigation revealed that the two militants disembarked from the light rail on the Jerusalem Boulevard, drew firearms, and began shooting randomly.

A passerby; Lev Kreitman and a security guard both returned fire and killed the gunmen shortly after the attack began. Kreitman was reported to be an Israeli Army reservist, who had recently returned from a 6 month deployment to Gaza and a survivor of the 7 October 2023 Nova music festival massacre.

== Casualties ==
Seven people were killed and seventeen others were wounded in the attack. Among the dead were three foreign citizens, one each from Greece, Georgia, and Moldova. The deceased were aged between 24 and 42 years of age. Injured victims were taken to the Wolfson Medical Center and the Tel Aviv Sourasky Medical Center.

== Perpetrators ==
The perpetrators were two Hamas operatives from Hebron in the occupied West Bank, named Muhammad Chalaf Sahar Rajab and Hassan Muhammad Hassan Tamimi. One was aged 19 and the other 25. Hamas's Al-Qassam Brigades claimed responsibility on the day following the attack.

== Aftermath ==
The Israeli Defense Force (IDF) imposed a closure on Hebron, and announced later that they had detained and questioned several people on suspicion of aiding the attackers, purchasing the rifle for attack and getting them into Israel proper without a permit.

Five days after the shooting, another attack occurred at the Beersheba central station, where the assailant opened fire and used a knife to kill one and wound thirteen before being killed by IDF troops.

== Response ==
Israeli Prime Minister Benjamin Netanyahu, addressed both the attack and the Iranian strikes against Israel offering his condolences to the families of those injured or killed in the attack, and his best wishes for the recovery of those injured.

Israel's National Security Minister Itamar Ben-Gvir referenced the missile attacks, stating that he would demand at the cabinet meeting that there was no more time for diplomacy and containment but moving forward the policy should be crushing the militants. Ben-Gvir visited the scene of the shooting and made claims that a nearby mosque may have members that participated in the engagement, and stated that he would close and destroy the mosque if it was deemed true. Yesh Atid MK Merav Ben Ari rebuffed the remarks of Ben-Gvir stating he had "threatened the Arab citizens of Jaffa" and that "he should take his racism elsewhere."

Minister of Finance Bezalel Smotrich indicated that he would demand at the cabinet meeting that day that family members of the gunmen would be deported to Gaza and their homes destroyed.

The Palestinian community in Greece issued a statement claiming that one of the victims, a Greek-Israeli who was not Jewish, "was not an innocent civilian" because he had served in the IDF. This statement was condemned by Greek Health Minister Adonis Georgiadis, who added that Greece stood with Israel "because Jews also have the right to a homeland where they can finally be safe."

== See also ==
- Violent incidents in reaction to the Gaza war
- 2024 Beersheba bus station shooting
