= Purple Line (Tel Aviv Light Rail) =

Light rail line under construction in the Tel Aviv metropolitan area

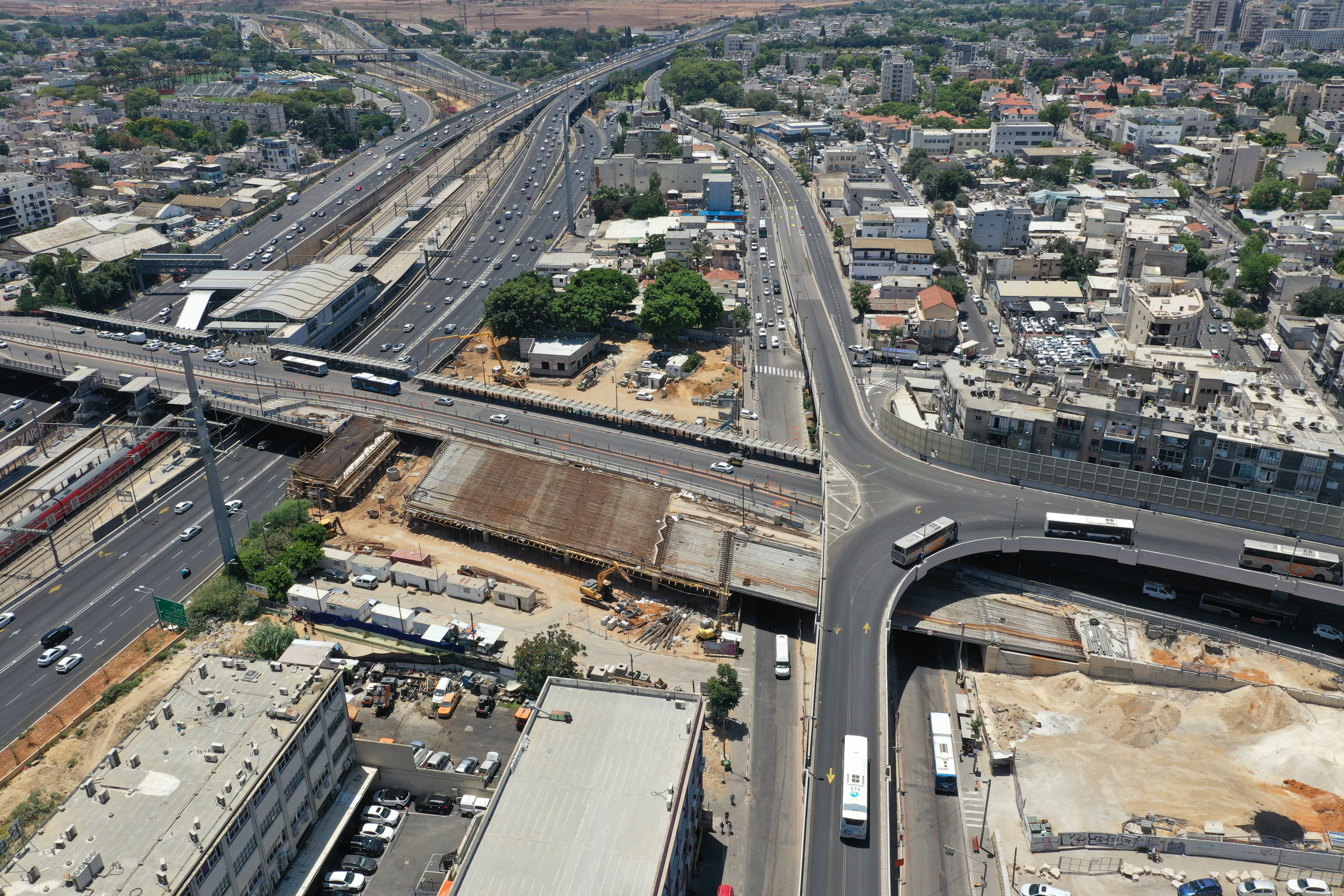
- Purple Line bridge under construction near Tel Aviv HaHagana

Overview
- Status: Under construction
- Owner: NTA
- Locale: Tel Aviv, Giv'atayim, Ramat Gan, Kiryat Ono, Giv'at Shmuel, Or Yehuda, Yehud
- Termini: Arlozorov (2000) Terminal (Tel Aviv Central Railway Station); Bar-Ilan University Tayasim Junction (Yehud / Bnei Atarot)
- Stations: 43
- Website: www.nta.co.il

Service
- Type: Light rail
- System: Tel Aviv Light Rail
- Rolling stock: 98 CAF Urbos LRV
- Daily ridership: 256,000 (projected)

History
- Planned opening: 2028 (estimated)

Technical
- Line length: 27 km (17 mi)

The Purple Line is a light rail transit (LRT) line under construction in the Tel Aviv metropolitan area in Israel. The line will operate as part of the planned Tel Aviv metropolitan area mass transit system and is expected to be the second line to open. The line will connect the city centre of Tel Aviv with its eastern suburbs of Yehud and Giv'at Shmuel.

The Purple Line is planned to be 27 km (17 mi) long and will serve 43 stations, all at street level. Construction started in 2018 and the line is expected to open in 2028 at an estimated cost of NIS 11 billion.

== Planning ==
In 2007, NTA submitted for government approval a comprehensive plan for a mass transit system in the Tel Aviv metropolitan area, which included light rail and bus rapid transit lines. The plan included an LRT line which was to loop around central Tel Aviv before turning east and branching out to Petah Tikva and Yehud. By 2008, that line was colour-coded purple and the Israeli government allocated NIS 55 million for its planning.

At the eastern end of the line, a northern branch was initially planned to continue from Giv'at Shmuel into Petah Tikva, crossing the city from southwest to northeast and ending at Petah Tikva Segula railway station. However, this proposal was met with opposition from Petah Tikva municipality and residents starting in 2010, and by 2015 the Petah Tikva section of the line was dropped. Another rejected proposal called to extend the southern branch of the line from Tayasim Junction eastwards to the town of Shoham.

In December 2011, the Israeli government selected the Purple Line as one of the lines to be planned by NTA. In August 2016, the government approved the construction and operation of the line, as a public-private partnership (PPP), at a then-estimated cost of NIS 8.6 billion. The western section of the route was approved in January 2017.

== Construction ==
In May 2017, NTA published tenders for project management and detailed planning of the line. Demolitions of buildings on the route in the Kfar Shalem neighbourhood of Tel Aviv began in July 2018, and preparatory construction works on the line commenced in December 2018.

Tenders for rolling stock, tracks, electrification, signalling and maintenance were published in July 2018, and by September 2020 five international consortia submitted their bids. The contract was awarded in January 2022, to a Spanish-Israeli consortium consisting of Grupo CAF and Shapir. The contract included maintenance of the line for 25 years, as well as delivery of 98 low-floor five-section units of CAF Urbos LRV to serve as rolling stock.

In the leadup to the announcement of the winning bid for the line's construction, maintenance and rolling stock, some sources reported that the US administration is pressuring for bids involving Chinese companies to not be selected for the project, in the context of the ongoing China–US trade war. After the winning bid was announced, losing Chinese bidder CRCC appealed the decision, arguing that its bid had been unlawfully disqualified. NTA argued in response that CRCC's bid was rejected due to its abnormally low price quote. In September 2022, the Tel Aviv District Court ruled in NTA's favour, concluding that CRCC presented no evidence to support its claim, and noting that Chinese companies continue to win tenders in infrastructure projects across Israel.

The tender for operation of the line was issued in May 2023.

In July 2023, financing for the line was secured, allowing for construction to begin in earnest. Construction is ongoing and is now expected to be completed in 2028, three years after the original deadline. The first vehicle Urbos LRV was delivered in June 2026.

== Route ==
The Purple Line will follow a semi-circular route in central Tel Aviv, between Tel Aviv–Savidor Central railway station (Arlozorov Terminal) in the north and Tel Aviv–HaHagana railway station in the south, looping westwards through the heart of the city. On the way it will pass through Arlozorov, Ben Yehuda, Allenby, Aliya and Levinsky streets. In this section it will interchange with the Red Line and the Green Line of the Tel Aviv Light Rail twice each: with the Red Line, in Arlozorov Terminal in the north and Yehuda HaLevi in the south; and with the Green Line, in Ibn Gabirol in the north and Har Tsiyon in the south.

From Tel Aviv HaHagana the line will continue eastwards along HaHagana Street and HaShalom Road, skirting Giv'atayim and passing through Ramat Gan by way of Aluf Sadeh and Sheba roads before reaching Sheba Medical Center. Here the line will split into two branches:

- The northern branch will travel northwards through Kiryat Ono and terminate in Bar-Ilan University and Giv'at Shmuel.
- The southern branch will continue eastwards along Route 461, skirting Or Yehuda and Yehud before reaching the terminus at Tayasim Junction near Bnei Atarot.

The Purple Line will be the only Tel Aviv LRT line to travel at street level in central Tel Aviv, and the only one to be aboveground in its entirety.
