= Death in the Terminal =

- Directed by: Tali Shemesh; Asaf Sudri
- Release date: 2016
- Running time: 52 minutes
- Country: Israel

Death in the Terminal is a 2016 Israeli Rashomon style documentary film by Tali Shemesh and Asaf Sudri, recounting the events of the October 2015 Beersheva bus station shooting.

== Synopsis ==
The film reconstructs the first 18 minutes after the shooting, when an Eritrean refugee was mistaken for a terrorist, shot by a security guard and beaten by bystanders. Security camera footage is inter-cut with eyewitness interviews and video from mobile phones. However, the film does not reveal until two-thirds of the way through that the man on the ground is innocent, leaving the audience to assume until then that he is the terrorist.

== Production ==
The film is directed by Tali Shemesh and Asaf Sudry. The security footage used was not released by the Israeli authorities, but was leaked to the filmmakers. The film was produced by filmmaker Alma Har'el in partnership with YesDocu, and executive produced by Megan Ellison and Mark Boal through his film and television production company Page 1.

== Release ==
The film aired on Israeli TV in 2016. The United States rights were acquired by First Look Media in early 2017 and it was released on BuzzFeed News and Topic.com on 6 September 2017.

== Awards ==
The film won Best Picture, Best Original Score and Best Director at the 2016 Tel Aviv DocAviv Festival. It won an Audience Award and Best Mid-length documentary at the Hot Docs Canadian International Documentary Festival in Toronto. The film also won Best Mid Length Documentary at the 2016 International Documentary Film Festival Amsterdam and Best Documentary under 60 minutes at the 2016 Ophir Awards.
