= Beersheba shooting =

The Beersheba shooting may refer to the following events in Beersheba, Israel:

- 2013 Beersheba shooting, a mass shooting in a bank
- 2015 Beersheba bus station shooting
- 2024 Beersheba bus station shooting

== See also ==
- Beersheba bus bombings of 2004
