= Izz El-Deen Sheikh Khalil =

Palestinian militant commander (c. 1962/1964–2004)

Izz El-Deen Sobhi Sheikh Khalil (alternately Ezzeddine) (Arabic: عز الدين الشيخ خليل) (circa 1962/1964 – September 26, 2004) was a senior member of the military wing of the Palestinian Islamist organization Hamas when he was killed by setting an automobile booby trap on 26 September 2004, in the al-Zahera district of southern Damascus, Syria. He was from the Shajaiyeh district of Gaza City. Although no specific groups have taken responsibility for his assassination, it is consistent in style with previous Israeli-sponsored assassinations, and with Israeli pledges to assassinate Hamas leaders.

The white Mitsubishi Pajero SUV he had just started was utterly demolished and burst into flames, charring the body almost beyond recognition. Pieces were assembled and scraped off the back seat to be carted to a nearby hospital for identification. Another car windshield and nearby ground-floor and second-story windows were shattered by the blast, and three Syrian civilians were injured.

Israeli military had said that two bus bombings that killed 16 civilians in the southern Israeli city of Beersheba on August 31 would be answered with a renewed assassination campaign against Hamas leaders.

Khalil was exiled from the Palestinian territories in 1992, one among a group of some 400 Palestinian militants who were deported to Lebanon in the early 1990s. He based himself in Damascus with other senior Hamas leaders, which was safer than the West Bank and Gaza Strip.

Khalil's name was rendered Izz al-Din al-Sheikh Khalil by CNN, Izz Eldine Subhi Sheik Khalil by Fox News, Izz El-Deen Sheikh Khalil by the BBC, and Izz al-Din al-Shaikh Khalil by Al Jazeera. His first name is the same as Izz ad-Din al-Qassam, the namesake of the Qassam Brigades who spell it "Ezzedeen".
