= Tali Shemesh =

Israeli documentary filmmaker

Tali Shemesh טלי שמש
- Born: 1969 (age 56–57); Jerusalem
- Occupation: Documentary filmmaker

Tali Shemesh (Hebrew: טלי שמש; born in 1969) is an Israeli documentary filmmaker.

== Biography ==
Shemesh was born in Jerusalem. She graduated from Sam Spiegel film school.

She then directed dozens of investigative and documentary television programs, including Uvda with Ilana Dayan. In 1999, she directed her first documentary film, Hashmena Vehayafa (Fat and Beautiful) for Channel 8.

In 2004, she directed the film Zahav Lavan Avoda Shchora (White Gold Black Work), which deals with the exploitation of outsourced workers at the Dead Sea Works. The film roused a public outcry.

In 2008, she directed the full-length documentary The Cemetery Club, about s a group of elderly Holocaust survivors who immigrated to Israel from Poland and meet every week for the last 20 years in the cemetery on Mount Herzl, and hold a meeting there that includes discussions and reading their writings. The film opened the DocAviv documentary film festival, to rave reviews, and became the most successful Israeli documentary film ever. Shemesh won the Most Promising Director award at the festival, and the film also won Best Cinematography. The Cemetery Club won the Israeli Film Academy (Ophir Award) Best Film award, the Mayor of Tel Aviv Award, the White Dove Award at the Leipzig International Documentary Film Festival, and Best Documentary awards at the Shanghai International Film Festival. It was nominated for a European Academy of Film award.

In 2016, Shemesh co-directed the film Death in the Terminal with Asaf Sudri. The film follows the events of the Beersheva bus station shooting, during which an Eritrean refugee, Habtoum Zarhoum, was killed by an angry mob, following an attack on the bus station. The film won several awards at DocAviv, including Best Film.

== Filmography ==
Year	Title	Role	Notes
2016	Death in the Terminal	Director, producer, writer	
2006	The Cemetery Club	Director, writer	
2004	Zahav Lavan Avoda Shchora	Director, writer	
1999	Hashmena Vehayafa	Director, writer	
1994	Leil Klulot	Producer	Short
1994	Lihyot Malka	Director	Short

== Awards ==
Year	Award	Category	Nominee(s)	Result	Notes
2006	Shanghai International Film Festival	Magnolia Award - Best Asian Documentary	The Cemetery Club	Won	
2006	Warsaw International Film Festival	Best Documentary	The Cemetery Club	Nominated'	
2006	DocAviv	Most Promising Director	Tali Shemesh	Won	
2006	Dok Leipzig	White Dove	The Cemetery Club	Won	
2006	European Film Awards	European Documentary	The Cemetery Club	Nominated	
2006	Awards of the Israeli Film Academy (Ophir)	Best Documentary	The Cemetery Club	Nominated	
2016	DocAviv	Best Documentary	Death in the Terminal	Won	Shared with Asaf Sudri
2016	IDFA	Best Mid-Length Documentary	Death in the Terminal	Won	Shared with Asaf Sudri
2016	Awards of the Israeli Film Academy (Ophir)	Best Short Documentary	Death in the Terminal	Won	Shared with Asaf Sudri
2017	Adelaide Film Festival	International Documentary Award - Best Documentary	Death in the Terminal	Nominated	Shared with Asaf Sudri
2017	Hot Docs Canadian International Documentary Festival	Best Mid-Length Documentary	Death in the Terminal	Won	Shared with Asaf Sudri
2018	Atlanta Jewish Film Festival	Jury Prize - Documentary Feature	Death in the Terminal	Won	Shared with Asaf Sudri
2018	Atlanta Jewish Film Festival	Jury Prize - Human Rights	Death in the Terminal	Won	Shared with Asaf Sudri

== See also ==
- List of female film and television directors
