= Clal Center =

Office tower and shopping mall in Jerusalem

Coordinates: 31°47′2″N 35°12′52″E

- מרכז כלל
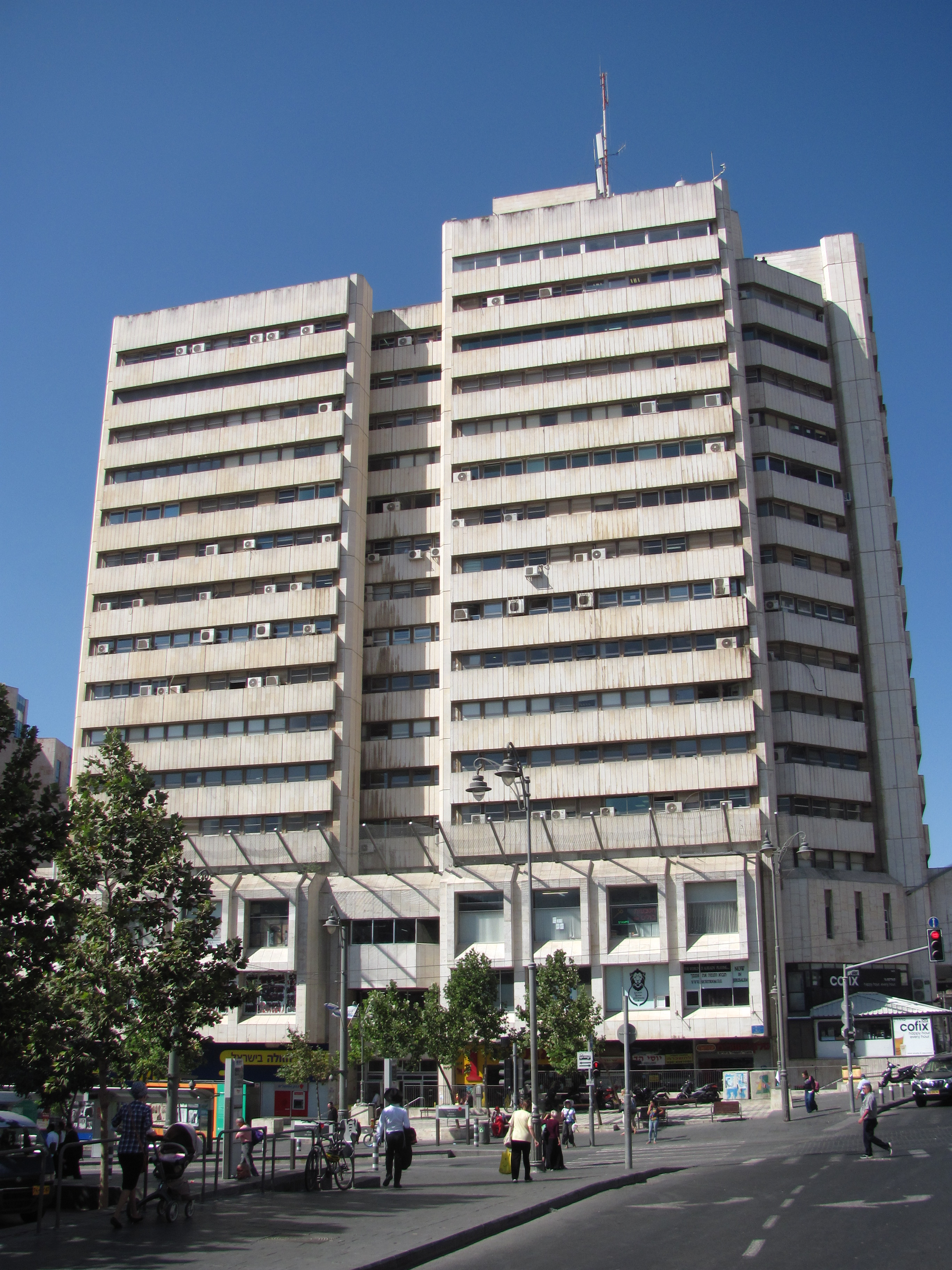
- Interactive map of the Clal Center area
- Alternative names: Clal Building (Hebrew: בנין כלל)

General information
- Type: High rise
- Architectural style: Modern architecture
- Location: 97 Jaffa Road, Jerusalem
- Completed: 1972

Height
- Height: 56.03 metres (183.8 ft)

Technical details
- Floor count: 15

Design and construction
- Architect: Dan Eitan

Clal Center (Hebrew: מרכז כלל, Mercaz Clal), also known as Clal Building (Hebrew: בנין כלל, Binyan Clal), is a 15-story office tower and indoor shopping mall on Jaffa Road in Jerusalem. Completed in 1972, it was the first upscale, indoor shopping mall in Jerusalem. Built as part of a plan to revitalize Jaffa Road, it enjoyed a brief period of high occupancy until many tenants relocated to malls and office buildings in new suburbs in the 1990s. It is widely viewed as a commercial and architectural failure.

== Location ==
The Clal Center is located in Jerusalem, Israel, at the southeastern corner of Jaffa Road and Kiah Street, one block east of the Mahane Yehuda Market. Its northern facade faces Jaffa Road and Davidka Square and its southern facade faces Agrippas Street. The building has several entrances opening onto Jaffa Road, Kiah Street, and Agrippas Street, as well as an underground parking garage accessible from Kiah Street.

== History ==
=== Alliance Vocational School campus ===
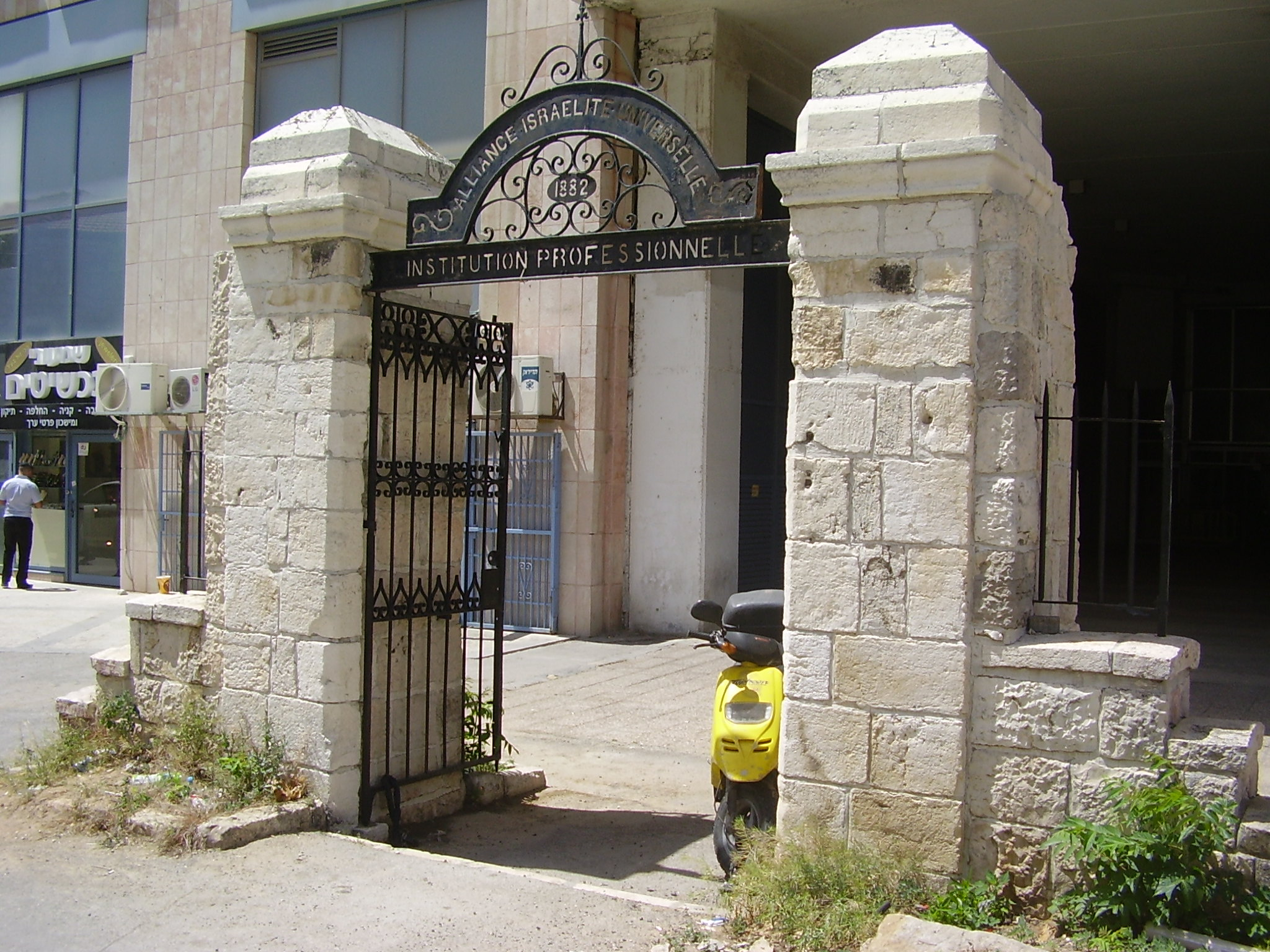
Memorial gate of the Alliance Vocational School

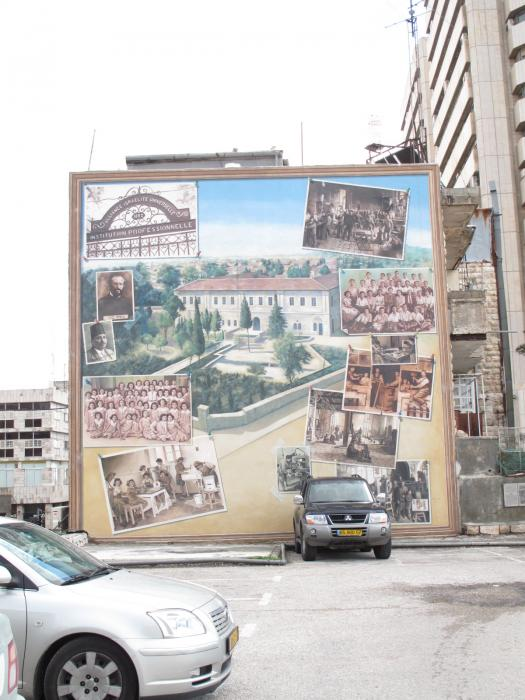
Mural depicting the Alliance School; the Clal Center can be seen in the background, right

The land on which the Clal Center stands was formerly part of the campus of the Alliance Vocational School (Kol Yisrael Haverim School), the first Jewish trade school in Jerusalem. Enrolling mostly Sephardic Jewish students, the school offered courses in tailoring, shoemaking, carpentry, blacksmithing, mechanics, engraving, sculpting (of stone, wood, and shell), coppersmithing, weaving, dyeing, stonecutting, and masonry. Founded in 1882 by the Alliance Israélite Universelle of Paris, the school occupied 17 dunams (0.017 km^{2}; 0.0066 sq mi) of land and consisted of a main building surrounded by long workshop buildings and landscaped gardens. Most of the school buildings and garden were razed in 1970 to make way for the Clal Center.

In 1976 a memorial to the demolished school was placed to the side of the Clal Center, facing Jaffa Road. The memorial consists of a decorative iron gate etched with the name of the school in French. The gate is mounted between two stone pillars; it is not standing in its original location.

Another memorial to the destroyed school appears in the form of a mural in the Mahane Yehuda Market parking lot to the west. This mural depicts paintings of the main building and garden, and pictures of teachers and students.

=== Project goals ===
The Clal Center was envisioned as a means to increase commercial activity and pedestrian presence between Mahane Yehuda Market to the west and the city center and Ben Yehuda Street to the east. According to Jerusalem architectural historian David Kroyanker, the Clal Center was "the first attempt to create a luxurious roofed shopping center in Jerusalem". It was also the first project to have an additional wing. The city granted the planners "exceptional building rights" in the hope that the project would boost business and commercial activity on Jaffa Road.

== Design ==
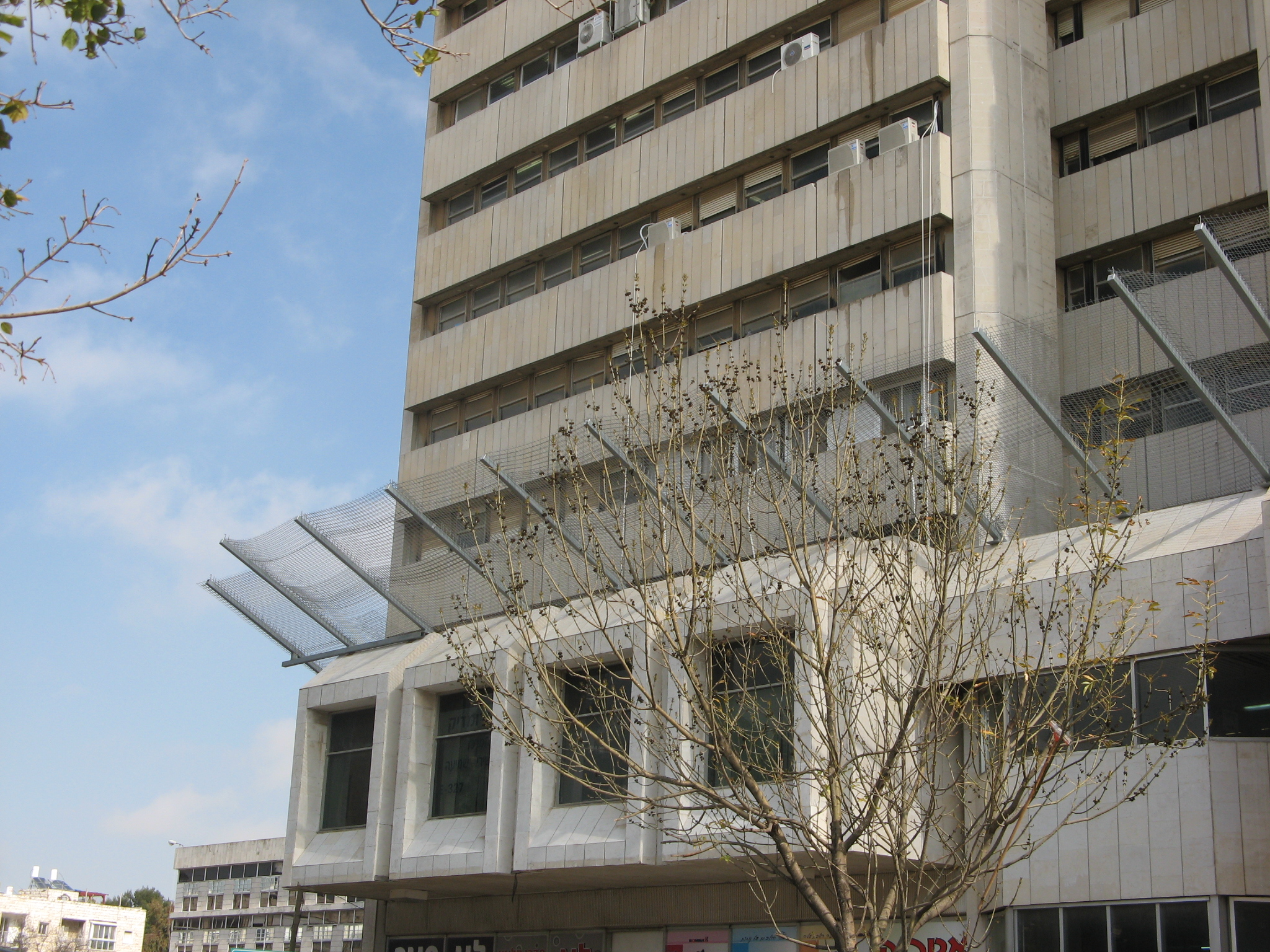
Rescue nets installed around the building's exterior

The Clal Center, completed in 1972, reflects the 1970s trend in Israeli architecture that moved away from small-scale buildings toward projects that contained "everything under one roof". The 15-story tower block was designed by Israeli architect Dan Eitan, who planned many large-scale public buildings and office towers in Israel, notably in Tel Aviv.

The shopping levels in the Clal Building are exceptionally large, with space for stores and a cinema. Stores are situated around the perimeter of a large, central atrium. Originally the atrium was open-air, but weather damage forced planners to install a semi-transparent roof. Several banks of elevators access upper-floor offices.

The exterior of the building reflects modern architecture with "straight lines, sequential windows, and a smooth, white stone facing". Because of the building's height, the Clal Center quickly became a popular venue for suicide jumpers who leaped from the upper-story windows. Rescue nets were subsequently installed on the outside of the building.

After the Clal Center was erected, a popular legend sprung up in Jerusalem that two criminals had murdered a third and buried him in the concrete foundations of the Clal Center. This rumor may have been started by parties interested in the project's failure.

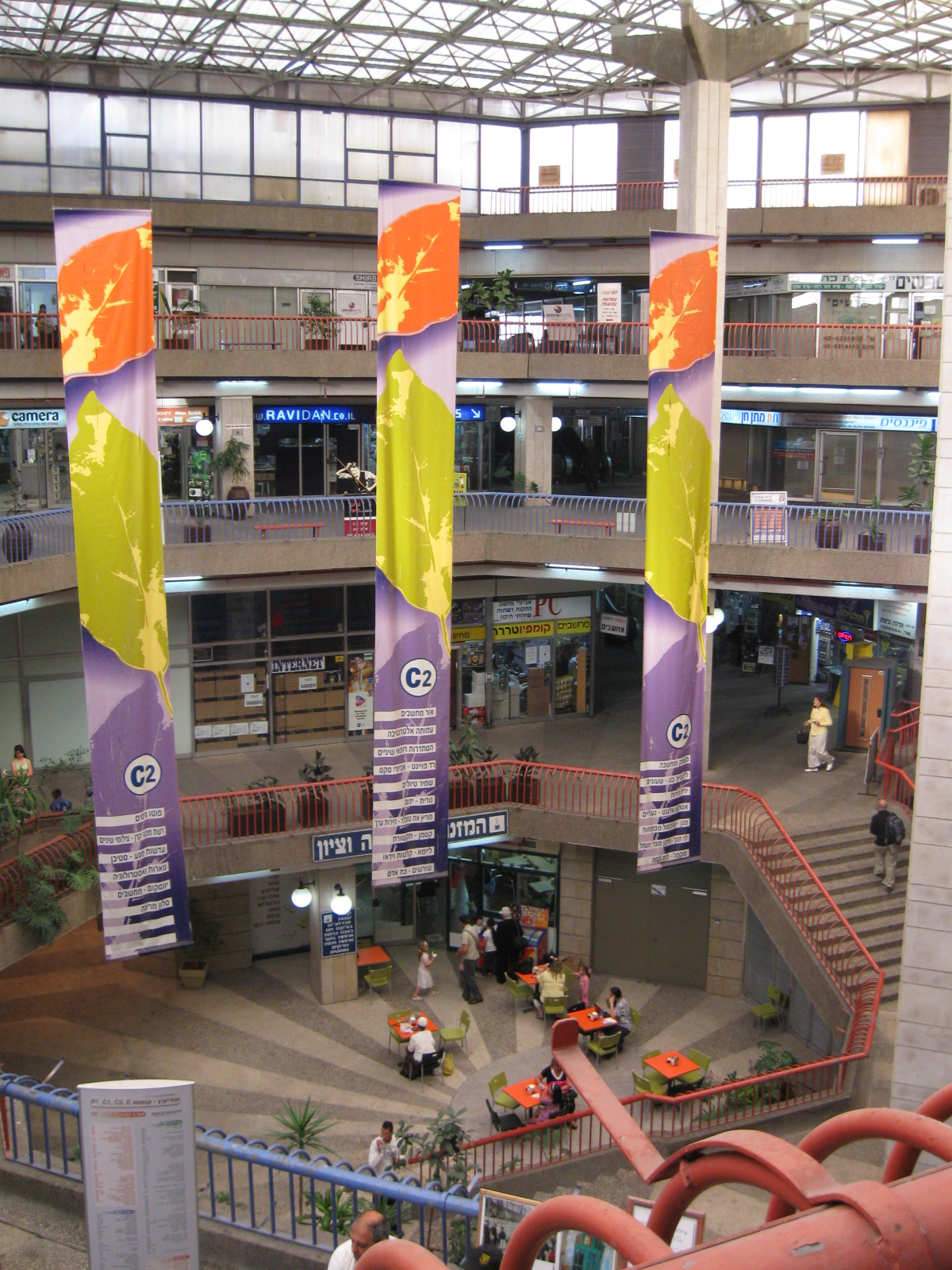
Partial view of shopping levels and food court inside the Clal Center

== Use ==
The Clal Center enjoyed a high occupancy rate from government offices, businesses, and private companies until the mid-1980s. The construction of Malha Mall and government facilities at Givat Ram precipitated the exodus of many private and government firms in the 1990s, leaving entire floors of the office tower unoccupied. Stores on the commercial level also began closing due to lack of customers; as of 2010, many stores were being used as storerooms by Mahane Yehuda Market merchants.

In the winter of 2011–2012, 25 homeless families that had been living in tent encampments in Independence Park and the Kiryat Yovel neighborhood were housed in empty offices in the Clal Center.

Current tenants include the following government offices: Israel Police Accidents Division – Jerusalem District, Ministry of Transport and Road Safety, Ministry of Justice Corporations Authority, and the Collection and Enforcement Agency. Other major tenants are the Jerusalem Light Rail customer service center, and branches of Bank Hapoalim and Israel Discount Bank. The King of Kings, a non-denominational Messianic Christian congregation, opened a "Jerusalem Prayer Tower" on the 14th floor of the Clal Center in 2004, affording panoramic views of the city. King of Kings Jerusalem Hebrew and English Messianic churches meet in Clal Center for their church services.

In 2011–2012, as part of the conversion of Jaffa Road into a pedestrian-only zone, a small parking area between the Clal Center and Jaffa Road was redeveloped into a public square. The project, costing over 4 million shekel, added a granite pavement, public seating, trees, and decorative lighting.

== Criticism ==
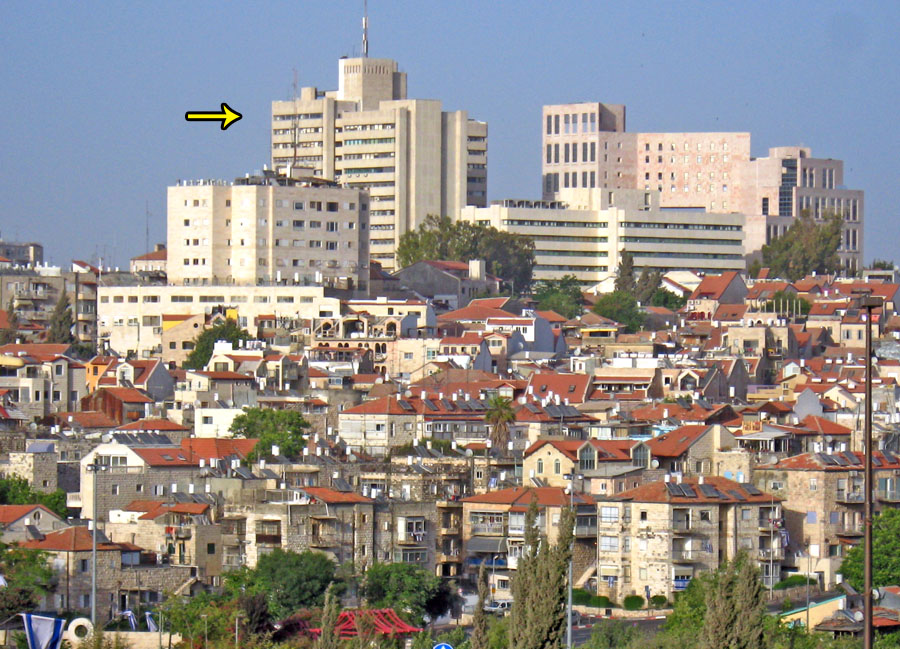
Clal Center (arrow) with Nachlaot neighborhood in foreground

Almost from its inception, the Clal Center was the target of criticism. Some critics decried the decision to demolish the historic Alliance Vocational School in order to build the project in the first place. Others pointed out that the style and height of the building were incompatible with typical low-rise Jerusalem architecture in the surrounding neighborhood.

Kroyanker notes that the building has not aged well; some of the stone tiles have fallen off and the rest appear weather-beaten and grimy. Inside, on the shopping levels, the "maze" of staircases that connect the levels are difficult to navigate, and the "wide granite surfaces create a very mournful effect". Poor lighting and parking accessibility have also been cited as problematic. Eitan, the architect, candidly added the Clal Center to a 1992 Israeli exhibition titled "Bad Jobs".

The goal of increasing commercial and business activity on Jaffa Road never materialized. Several attempts were made to bring a pedestrian presence to the street, such as the construction of the Windows residential tower next door, but to date nothing has been successful and the project has been deemed a commercial failure.

Kroyanker contends that not only did the Clal Center fail to revitalize Jaffa Road, it "actually accelerated its degeneration". In particular, he points to the lack of anchor stores, the lack of continuity of small businesses, and the cessation of activity in the stores and banks in the Clal Center in the early afternoon for making the project "a typical Jerusalem commercial failure".

== Incidents ==
On June 11, 2003, a suicide bomber dressed as a Haredi Jew detonated an explosive pack on an eastbound #14 bus in front of the Clal Center. The attack killed 16 and injured more than 100.

In July 2013, a man entered a law office in the Clal Center and shot dead a father and daughter who worked as a legal team over an apparent business dispute.

== Sources ==
- Kroyanker, David; Wahrman, Dror (1983). Jerusalem Architecture, Periods and Styles: The Jewish Quarters and Public Buildings Outside the Old City Walls, 1860–1914. Jerusalem Institute for Israel Studies. ISBN 9652610194.
