= Tel Aviv Light Rail =

Mass transit system for Tel Aviv, Israel

Tel Aviv Light Rail הרכבת הקלה בגוש דן قطار تل أبيب الخفيف

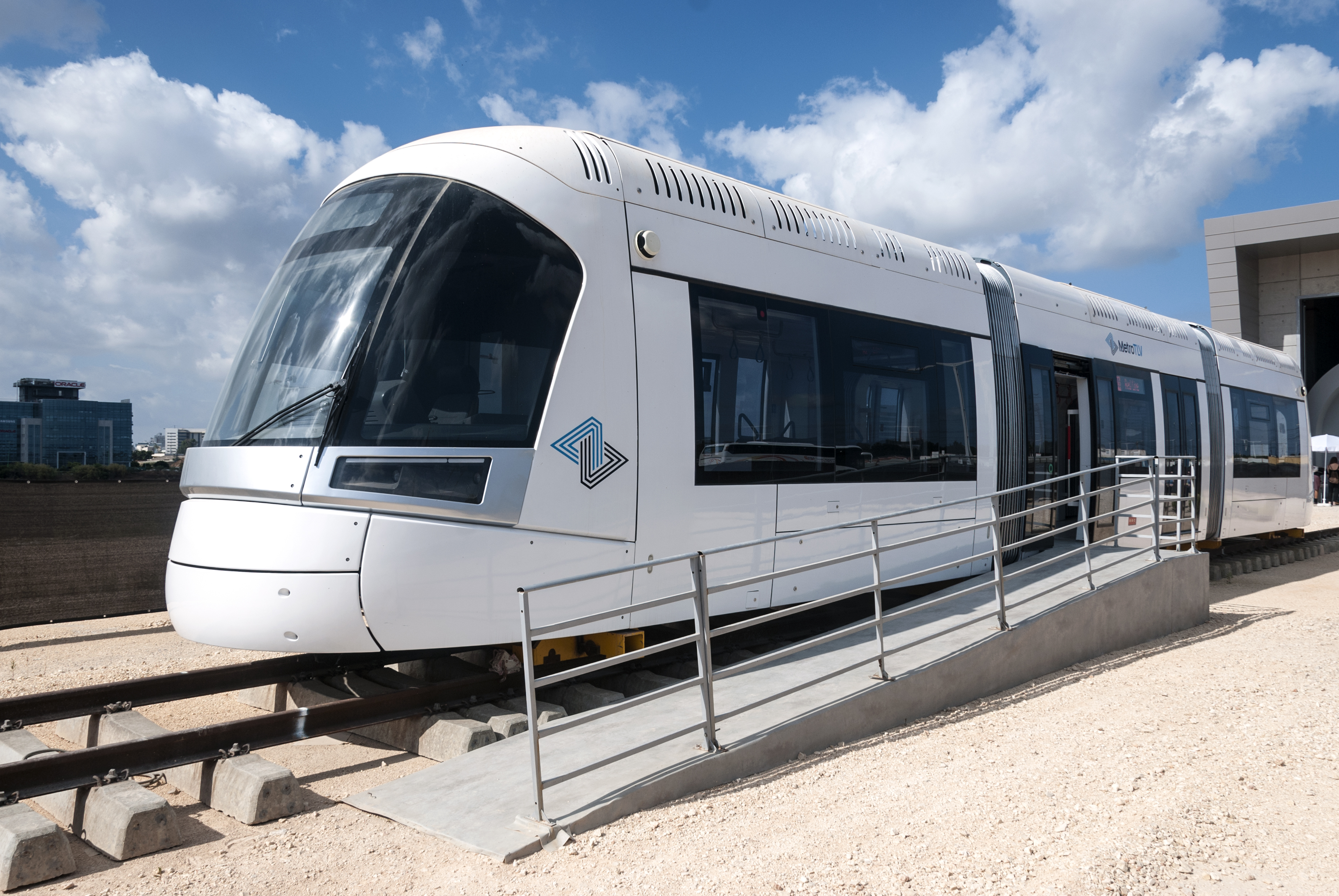
- Tel Aviv Light Rail-branded Mock-up trainset of the red line standing outside the light rail depot

Overview
- Owner: NTA
- Area served: Tel Aviv metropolitan area
- Transit type: Light rail
- Number of lines: 3 (Red Line, Green Line, Purple Line)
- Number of stations: 34 (Red Line), 58 (Green Line), 43 (Purple Line)
- Daily ridership: Red Line – 100,000
- Headquarters: Tel Aviv
- Website: https://www.dankal.co.il/

Operation
- Began operation: August 18, 2023; 3 years ago
- Operator: Tevel Metro
- Rolling stock: CRRC Changchun LRV (Red Line), Alstom Citadis X05 (Green Line), CAF Urbos 100 (Purple Line)

Technical
- Track gauge: 1,435 mm
- Top speed: 80 km/h (50 mph) in underground sections

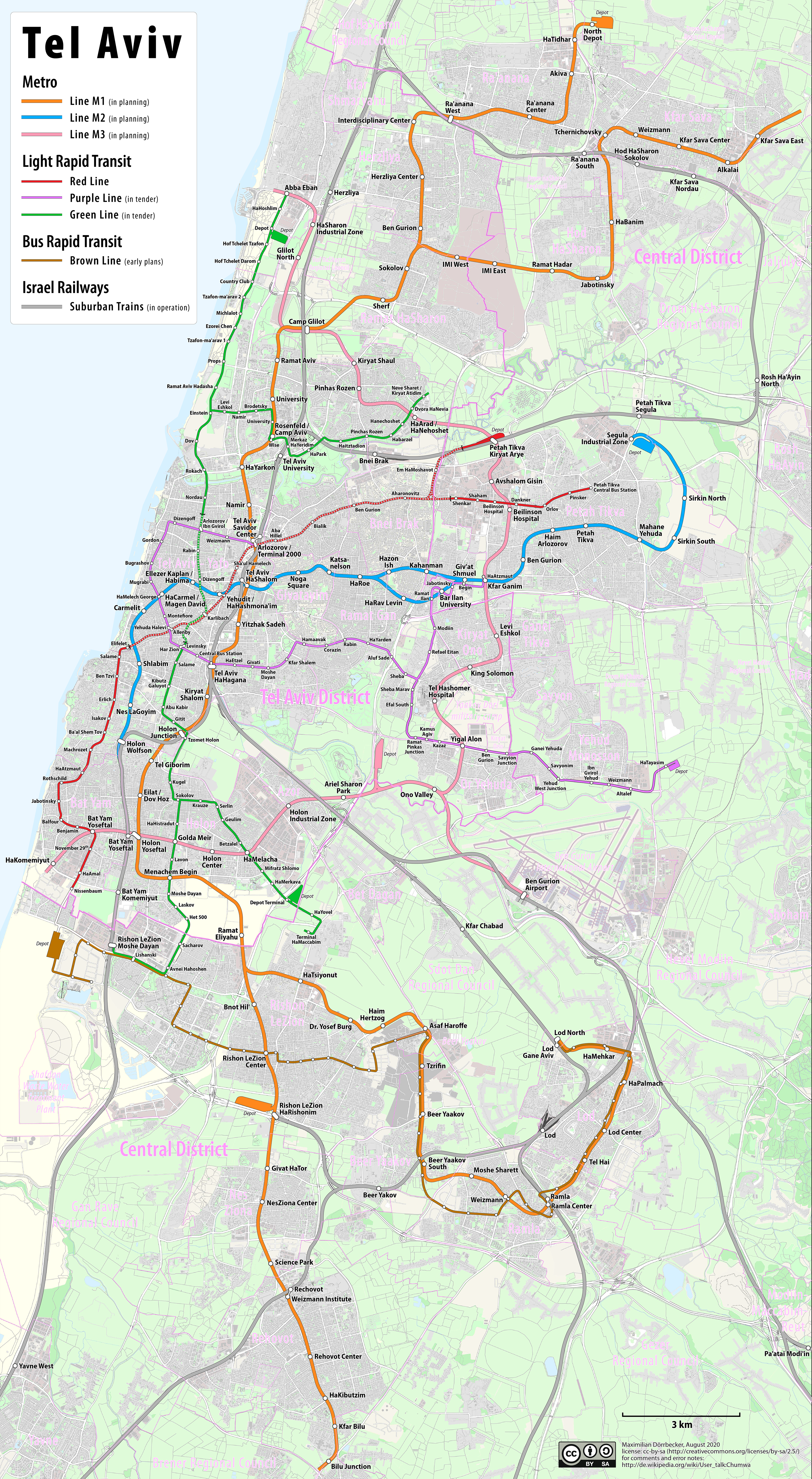
Map of the planned network as of 2020. The Red Line is in service; the Green and Purple lines are under construction; the rest is subject to change.

The Tel Aviv Light Rail, (Note: Hebrew: הרכבת הקלה בתל אביב, romanized: Ha'rakēvet Ha'kalā Be'Tel Avīv Arabic: قطار تل أبيب الخفيف, romanized: Qītar Tall ʾAbīb Al-khāfifa) also known as Dankal, (Note: Hebrew: דנקל Arabic: دانكال) is a mass transit system for Gush Dan, the Tel Aviv metropolitan area in central Israel. The system will include different modes of mass transit, including rapid transit (metro), light rail transit (LRT), and bus rapid transit (BRT). Overseen by NTA Metropolitan Mass Transit System Ltd., a government agency, the project will complement the intercity and suburban rail network operated by Israel Railways.

As of 2023, two LRT lines are under construction and one available to the public. Work on the Red Line, the first in the project, started on September 21, 2011, following years of preparatory works, and was opened on August 18, 2023, after numerous delays. Construction of the Purple Line started in December 2018; work on the Green Line began in January 2019.

The network was originally planned to be called "MetroTLV" but was changed to "Dankal". The name comes from the metropolitan area of Tel Aviv, Gush Dan, and "light" ("kal", Hebrew: קל).

== History ==
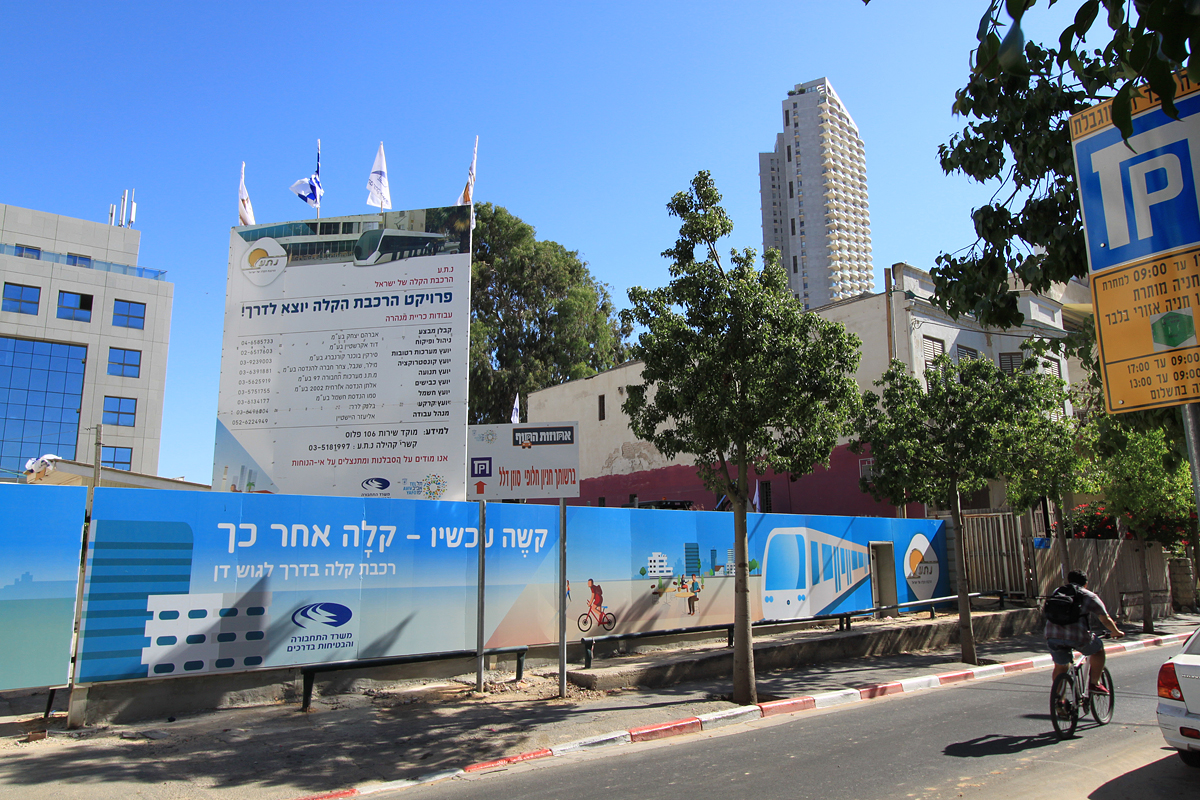
Tel Aviv Light rail, construction site on Yehuda Halevi Street

The first proposals for a tramway in the area were made by the Lebanese engineer George Franjieh in November 1892, about nine weeks after the inauguration of the Jaffa–Jerusalem railway. The plan called for a main line between southern and northeastern Jaffa, with spurs to the harbor and the eastern orchards. The plan was considered uneconomical and was shelved. A later plan called for a light railway from Jaffa to the nearby towns of Rishon LeZion, Petah Tikva and Wilhelma.

A Decauville light railway was built in Jaffa and Tel Aviv in World War I, connecting the port with the Yarkon River. It was used for about a decade after the war, and dismantled at a later date.

A light rail line, with a route similar to the current Red Line, was planned in 1921 by Pinhas Rutenberg. An attempt to build the line in 1924-5 was unsuccessful.

A subway system was first planned in the mid-1960s but a station at the Shalom Meir Tower was all that was completed of the project, with no rails laid.

=== Revised plan: Light Rail ===
In 2000, the plan for a subway was changed to one for light rail, and more plausible plans for a mass transit system in Tel Aviv were unveiled. After the first Red Line spanning 22 kilometres (14 mi) was approved, excavation began in late 2009, with construction of the underground stations starting in August 2015. The Red Line became operational on August 18, 2023.

In December 2006, the MTS group was awarded a Build-Operate-Transfer contract for the Red Line of the light rail, by which they are to build and operate the line for its first 32 years. MTS consisted of Africa Israel, Siemens (Germany), Egged, China Civil Engineering Construction (China), Soares da Costa (Portugal), and HTM (Netherlands). After many years of delays due to MTS financing issues, in December 2010 the government revoked MTS's concession and nationalized the project, putting it under the authority of NTA, the government agency which was in charge of overseeing the overall development of the rapid transit system in Gush Dan.

=== Construction works ===
Construction on the Red Line began in August 2015. It opened on August 18, 2023. Infrastructure works for the Purple Line began in December 2018. Infrastructure works for the Green Line began in November 2019.

== Lines ==
Primary line	Color	Service bullets
Red Line	Red	Red Line (Tel Aviv Light Rail)
Green Line	Green	
Purple Line	Purple	

Red Line is in service; Green and Purple lines are under construction. When complete, they will cover a network of 85 kilometres (53 mi).

Line	Length	No. of stations	Status	Opening	Passengers	Primary municipalities	Terminals	Rolling Stock
Red Line	24 km (15 mi) (12 km (7.5 mi) underground)	34 (10 underground)	In service	August 18, 2023	100,000 daily	Tel Aviv, Petah Tikva, Bnei Brak, Ramat Gan, Bat Yam	Petah Tikva–Kiryat Aryeh station (depot) (western branch); Petah Tikva Central Bus Station (eastern branch); HaKomemiyut (Bat Yam)	CRRC Changchun LRV
Green Line	39 km (24 mi) (4.5 km (2.8 mi) underground)	62 (4 underground)	Under construction	Southern section est. 2028, northern section est. 2030	est. 275,000 daily	Tel Aviv, Herzliya, Holon, Rishon LeZion	Herzliya Pituah (northwestern branch); Neve Sharett (Tel Aviv) (northeastern branch); Rishon LeZion–Moshe Dayan station (southwestern branch); Volkani Institute (Rishon LeZion) (southeastern branch)	Alstom Citadis
Purple Line	27 km (17 mi)	43	Under construction	est. 2027	est. 256,000 daily	Tel Aviv, Ramat Gan, Kiryat Ono, Giv'at Shmuel, Or Yehuda, Yehud	Tel Aviv–Savidor Center station; Bar Ilan University (Giv'at Shmuel) (northern branch); Tayasim Junction (Yehud) (southern branch)	CAF Urbos

=== Red Line ===
12 km (7 1/2 mi) of the 24-kilometre (15 mi) Red Line was built underground, with the remaining overground segment constructed as a light rail/tram. It has 34 stops, 10 of which are underground, with an average distance of about 1,000 meters between underground stops and of about 500 meters between overground stops. The line runs from Bat Yam in the southwest, through Jaffa and central Tel Aviv, including at Tel Aviv–Savidor Center railway station, and carries on to Petah Tikva, through Ramat Gan and Bnei Brak. An extension to Rishon LeZion is planned. It has been forecast that 70 million passengers will be using this line annually.

Stations (underground in italics): HaKomemiyut, He'Amal, Kaf Tet BeNovember, Yoseftal, Binyamin, Balfour, Jabotinsky, Rothschild, Ha'Atsma'ut, Mahrozet, HaBesht, Isakov, Ehrlich, Bloomfield Stadium, Shalma (Salame), Elifelet, Allenby, Carlebach, Yehudit, Sha'ul HaMelekh, Arlosoroff, Abba Hillel, Bialik, Ben-Gurion, Aharonovich. From Aharonovich, one branch continues to Shenkar, Shaham, Beilinson, Dankner, Krol, Pinsker, Petah Tikva Central Bus Station (Terminal); another continues to Em HaMoshavot Bridge and Kiryat Arye.

The work on Allenby station began on February 8, 2015.

In May 2021, a test run of the red line began in Petah Tikva. The Red Line was opened to the public in August 2023.

Test drive of the red light rail line in Tel Aviv, November 2021

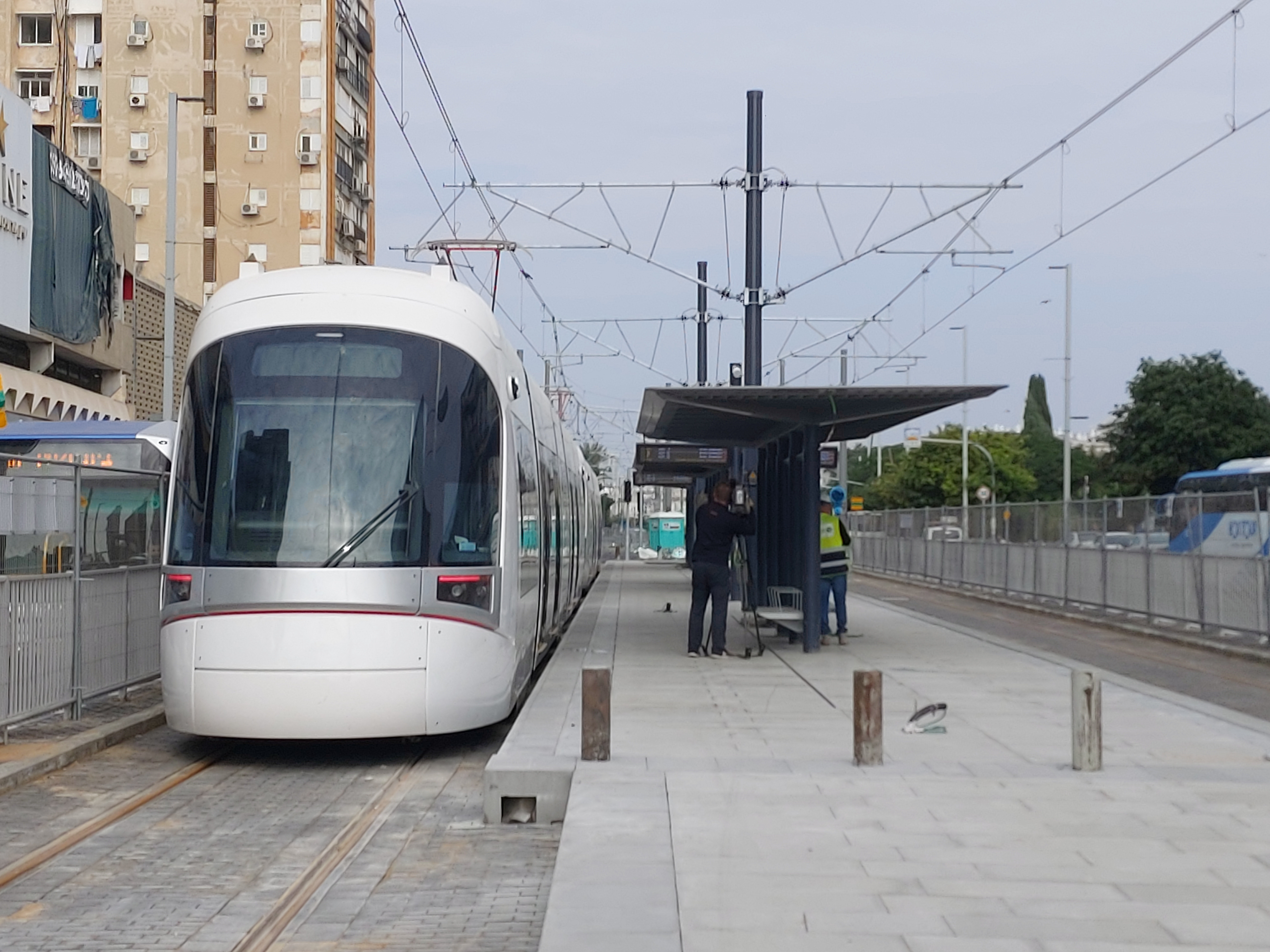

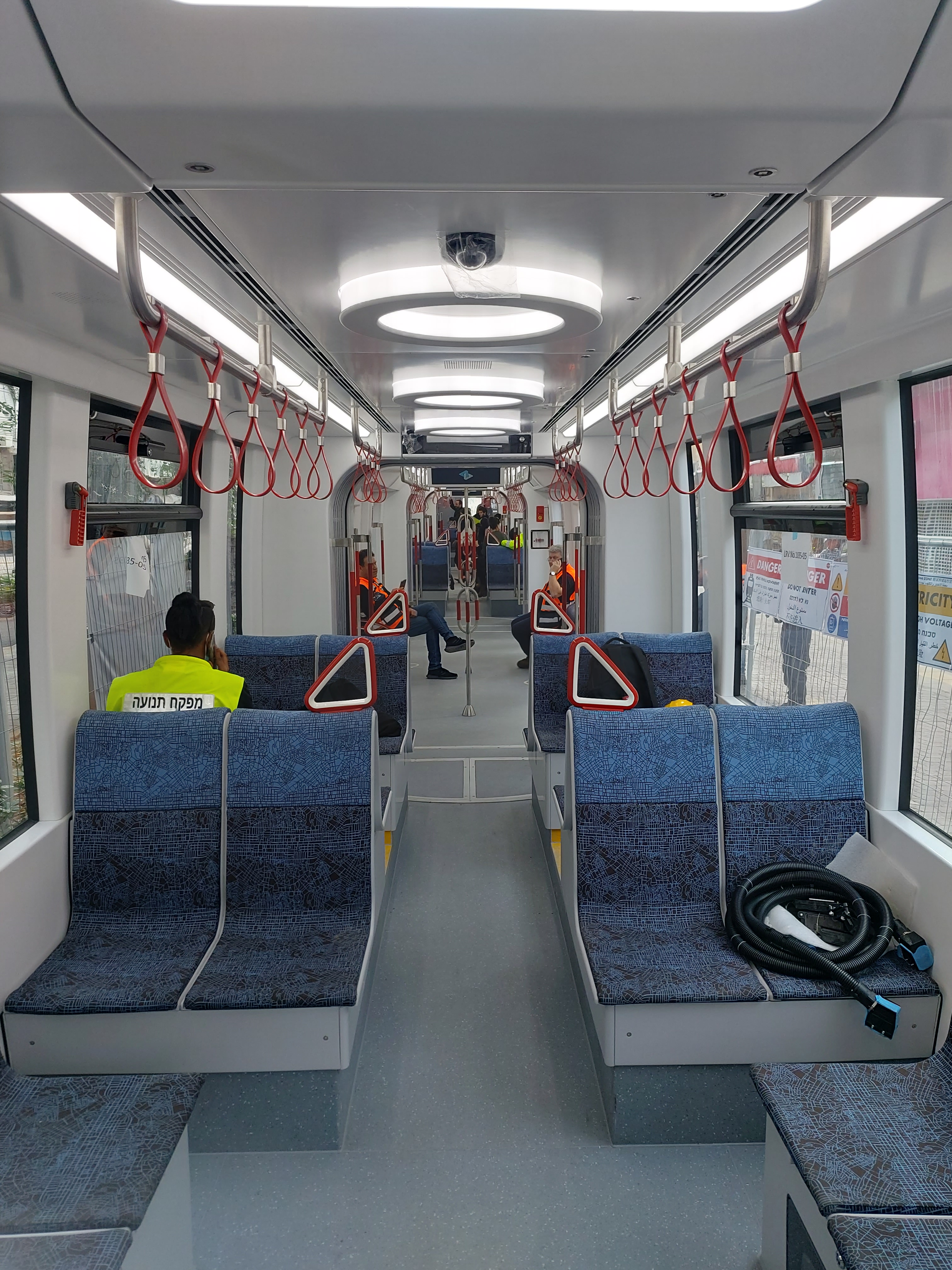

=== Green Line ===
The second or Green Line, in the tender phase, is 39 kilometres (24 mi) in length, of which 4.5 kilometres (2 3/4 mi) is underground. It will have 62 stops that would run from the west of Rishon LeZion northwards through Holon through central Tel Aviv splitting into two branches: one to Herzliya in the north and the other one to Ramat HaHayal neighborhood in Tel Aviv in the northeast. Only its central Tel Aviv segment, four of the 62 stations, will be underground, from Levinski Street through Ibn Gabirol Street until the Yarkon River. The expected annual passenger forecast is 65 million. NTA included the design and boring of the Green Line's tunnels as part of Red Line's tunnels overall contract so that work on the Green Line's underground portion could commence immediately following the completion of the Red Line tunnels.

=== Purple Line ===
The third, or Purple Line, is envisaged as a 27 kilometres (17 mi) line with 43 stops and will connect Sheba Hospital through Giv'at Shmuel and Kiryat Ono, and will connect the Arlozorov bus terminal and Tel Aviv–Savidor Central railway station to Yehud and Or Yehuda through Ramat Gan. It will follow a semi-circular route in central Tel Aviv, between Tel Aviv–Savidor Central railway station in the north and Tel Aviv–HaHagana railway station in the south, looping westwards through the heart of the city, and will interchange with the Red Line and the Green Line twice each. This line will be over-ground for its entire route.

=== Cancelled lines ===
==== Yellow Line ====
This line would have begun in Kfar Saba then continued on to Hod Hasharon, Herzliya, Ramat Hasharon on Sokolov Street, before joining Ben-Gurion Street in Ramat Gan, then Yitzhak Rabin Street in Givatayim, then Moshe Dayan Street in Tel Aviv, Mikveh Israel, it would end in Holon after crossing Ariel Sharon Park. Parts of it were superseded by the M1 metro line. As of December 2024, the plan is to run the line as a BRT line.

== Other mass transit systems ==
=== Metro ===
The rapid transit plan for Gush Dan, conceived and approved in 2016, called for three underground metro lines, centered on Tel Aviv: a north–south line (M1), an east–west line (M2), and a circular line (M3). The system is currently under construction.

Line	Length	No. of stations	Status	Opening	Primary municipalities	Terminals
M1	85 km (53 mi)	62	M1S – Approved; M1C – Approved; M1N – Planned	NET 2032	Tel Aviv, Lod, Ramle, Be'er Ya'akov, Rehovot, Nes Ziona, Rishon LeZion, Holon, Ramat HaSharon, Herzliya, Ra'anana, Hod HaSharon, Kfar Sava	Ra'anana (northwestern branch); Kfar Sava (northeastern branch); Rehovot (southwestern branch); Lod–Ganei Aviv (southeastern branch)
M2	26 km (16 mi)	22	Approved	NET 2032	Tel Aviv, Bat Yam, Giv'atayim, Ramat Gan, Bnei Brak, Petah Tikva	Holon–Wolfson; Petah Tikva
M3	39 km (24 mi)	25	Approved	NET 2032	Tel Aviv, Herzliya, Petah Tikva, Kiryat Ono, Or Yehuda, Azor, Holon, Bat Yam	Herzliya Pituah; Bat Yam: Ben Gurion Airport (branch)

=== Bus rapid transit ===
Most BRT lines planned for Gush Dan were cancelled in 2016 and replaced with metro lines. Only plans for the Brown Line were retained, however, no date for start of construction has been announced.

Line	Length	No. of stations	Status	Opening	Primary municipalities	Terminals
Brown Line	30 km (19 mi)	46	Planned	2028	Rishon LeZion, Be'er Ya'akov, Ramle, Lod	Rishon LeZion–Moshe Dayan; Lod–Ganei Aviv
Blue Line	23 km (14 mi)	44	Planned	2028	Rehovot, Ness Ziona, Rishon LeZion, Azor, Holon	Bilu Junction; Holon Junction

==== Brown Line ====
The Brown Line is a planned BRT line that will serve the southern metropolitan area. Starting at Moshe Dayan Railway Station in western Rishon LeZion, it will continue east via central Rishon LeZion, bypassing Assaf HaRofeh Medical Center, until Ramle, where it splits into two branches: one continues to Lod in the northeast and the second continues to eastern Ramle in the east. There is a possibility of making it a light rail line eventually.

==== Blue Line ====
The Blue Line is the first BRT line not to pass via Tel Aviv. The line will begin in Bilu Junction near Rehovot and continues to HaRishonim Railway Station in Rishon LeZion via Ness Ziona and will end at the Holon junction. This line is expected to open in 2027 or 2028.

=== Cancelled lines ===
==== Pink Line ====
The Pink Line was planned to serve the northern metropolitan area, beginning in northeastern Kfar Saba and continuing through its main streets until crossing Highway 4 to Ra'anana, continuing through Ahuza Street until western Ra'anana, and continuing to Herzliya and crossing it until the Marina area, where it would have terminated. This line was superseded by the M1 and M3 metro lines.

==== Orange Line ====
The Orange Line would have been the only line isolated from the system. It would serve only the city of Netanya in the northern metropolitan area. It would be a circular line that connects both sides of the city, crossing Highway 2.

== See also ==
- Carmelit
- Jerusalem Light Rail
- List of tram and light rail transit systems
- History of Tel Aviv
- Transport in Israel
