= Beersheba bus bombings =

2004 suicide bombings in Israel

- Part of the Second Intifada militancy campaign
- The attack site
- Location: 31.2504°N 34.7981°E; Beersheba, Israel
- Date: August 31, 2004; 22 years ago c. 3:00 pm
- Attack type: Suicide bombing
- Deaths: 16 Israeli civilians (+2 attackers)
- Injuries: 100+ Israeli civilians
- Perpetrator: Hamas claimed responsibility
- Assailants: Nassem Jabari, Ahmad Qawasme
- No. of participants: 2

The Beersheba bus bombings were two Palestinian suicide attacks carried out nearly simultaneously aboard commuter buses in Beersheba, Israel, on August 31, 2004. Sixteen people were killed and more than 100 were injured. Hamas claimed responsibility for the attacks.

== Background ==
The previous major attack on Be'er sheva was the 19 October 1998 grenade attack on the Central bus station, where 64 people were wounded when a Palestinian from Hebron threw two grenades at the bus station.

During the Second Intifada in the early 2000s (decade), at the time which was characterized by an intensified period of suicide attacks were carried out in Israel by the Palestinian militant organizations in Israel, Be'er Sheva was considered a relatively safe place, as it did not experience any terror attacks.

In 2004, the year in which the attack was carried out, the second intifada was declining, and then the tensions escalated in March 2004, with the assassination of the leader of Hamas Ahmed Yassin. A month later, in April, Yassin's successor Abdel Aziz al-Rantissi was assassinated. After those two assassinations Israel had the quietest four months since the outbreak of the Second Intifada, which came to an end when the Beersheba bus bombings were carried out.

== The attacks ==
At time of the attacks, the "Metrodan Beersheba" public buses (lines 6 and 12) were packed with Israeli civilians and were traveling along the main street of Beersheba, Rager Boulevard, near the City hall, at a very crowded place. At 14:50 pm, the first bomber blew up the explosive device hidden underneath his clothes on bus No. 6 as the bus passed a busy intersection in the center of town. Two minutes later, the second bomber blew himself up while on board bus No. 12 which was located about 100 meters away from the first bus. The force of the explosion, which blew away and mutilated the limbs of many civilians, made it difficult for the authorities to identify the victims. The youngest victim was a 3½ year old boy killed while sitting on his mother's lap.

== The victims ==
The victims were all residents of Beersheva.

- Shoshana Amos, 64
- Aviel Atash, 3
- Vitaly Brodsky, 52
- Tamara Dibrashvilli, 70
- Roman Sokolovsky, 53
- Emmanuel Yosef (Yosefov) 28
- Raisa Forer, 55
- Larisa Gomanenko, 48
- Denise Hadad, 50
- Tatiana Kortchenko, 49
- Tiroayent Takala, 33
- Rosita Lehman, 45
- Karine Malka, 23
- Nargiz Ostrovsky, 54
- Margarita Sokolov, 57
- Eliyahu Uzan, 58

== The assailants ==
The military wing of Hamas, Izz ad-Din al-Qassam Brigades, claimed responsibility for the attacks.

A video tape released after the attack by Hamas showed the two suicide bombers, Nassem Jabari (22) and Ahmad Qawasameh (26), posing with rifles and posters. Hamas distributed leaflets in Hebron which stated that the attack was in revenge for the assassination of Hamas leaders Ahmed Yassin and Abdel Aziz al-Rantissi by Israel.

The Israeli government accused Syria and "terror command posts in Damascus" of involvement in the attack.

== Reactions ==
Following the bombing, an estimated 20,000 Hamas supporters in Gaza took to the streets to celebrate.

The Israeli Foreign Minister Silvan Shalom placed the blame on Yasser Arafat for not preventing the attacks, and for bringing nothing but "terror and evil" since his return to the Palestinian territories.

== Aftermath ==
The attack was a shock to the Israeli public, especially because two Palestinian suicide bombers managed to get from Hebron to Beersheba after simply walking across the Green Line demarcation lines without difficulty. For this reason, after the attack many Israeli public officials, including Police Commissioner Moshe Karadi made emphasized that a hermetic separation barrier between Israel and the West Bank was vital to Israel's security. The southern part of the Israeli West Bank barrier was completed only after the attack.

On September 26, 2004, Izz El-Deen Sheikh Khalil, a senior member of Hamas' military wing, was killed in a car bombing in the al-Zahera district of southern Damascus, Syria. The killing was blamed on Israeli agents. Officially, the Israeli government refused to claim responsibility, but unnamed Israeli sources unofficially acknowledged that Israel had assassinated Khalil as a response to the Beersheba bus bombings.

On February 11, 2026, the IDF announced that it killed Basel Himouni, a Hamas fighter from Hebron who was accused of dispatching the suicide bombers to Beersheba, in an airstrike in Gaza on February 4. Himouni had been arrested in October 2004 but was released in the Gilad Shalit prisoner exchange in 2011.

== See also ==
- Beersheva bus station shooting
