= Green Line (Tel Aviv Light Rail) =

Proposed light rail line in Tel Aviv

Overview
- Status: Under construction
- Locale: Tel Aviv, Rishon LeZion, Holon, Herzliya
- Stations: 58
- Website: www.nta.co.il

Service
- Type: Light rail
- System: Tel Aviv Light Rail
- Services: 2
- Operator(s): NTA
- Rolling stock: Alstom Citadis

History
- Planned opening: 2028 (southern section), 2030 (entirely)

Technical
- Line length: 35 km (22 mi)
- Track gauge: 1,435 mm (4 ft 8 1/2 in) standard gauge
- Electrification: 1500 V DC OHLE
- Operating speed: 50 km/h (31 mph) in Street Level; 70 km/h (43 mph) Underground

The Green Line is the second section of a light rail system in the Tel Aviv metropolitan area, known as the Tel Aviv Light Rail, which is under construction. The line will run from Rishon LeZion northwards through Holon through central Tel Aviv and will split into two branches: One to Herzliya in the north, and one to Ramat HaHayal neighborhood in Tel Aviv in the northeast. The expected annual passenger forecast is 65 million.

NTA Metropolitan Mass Transit System Limited is including the design and boring of the Green Line's tunnels as part of Red Line's tunnels overall contract so that work on the Green Line's underground portion can commence immediately following the completion of the Red Line tunnels.
