= Red Line (Tel Aviv Light Rail) =

1st Operational Section of the Tel Aviv Light Rail system

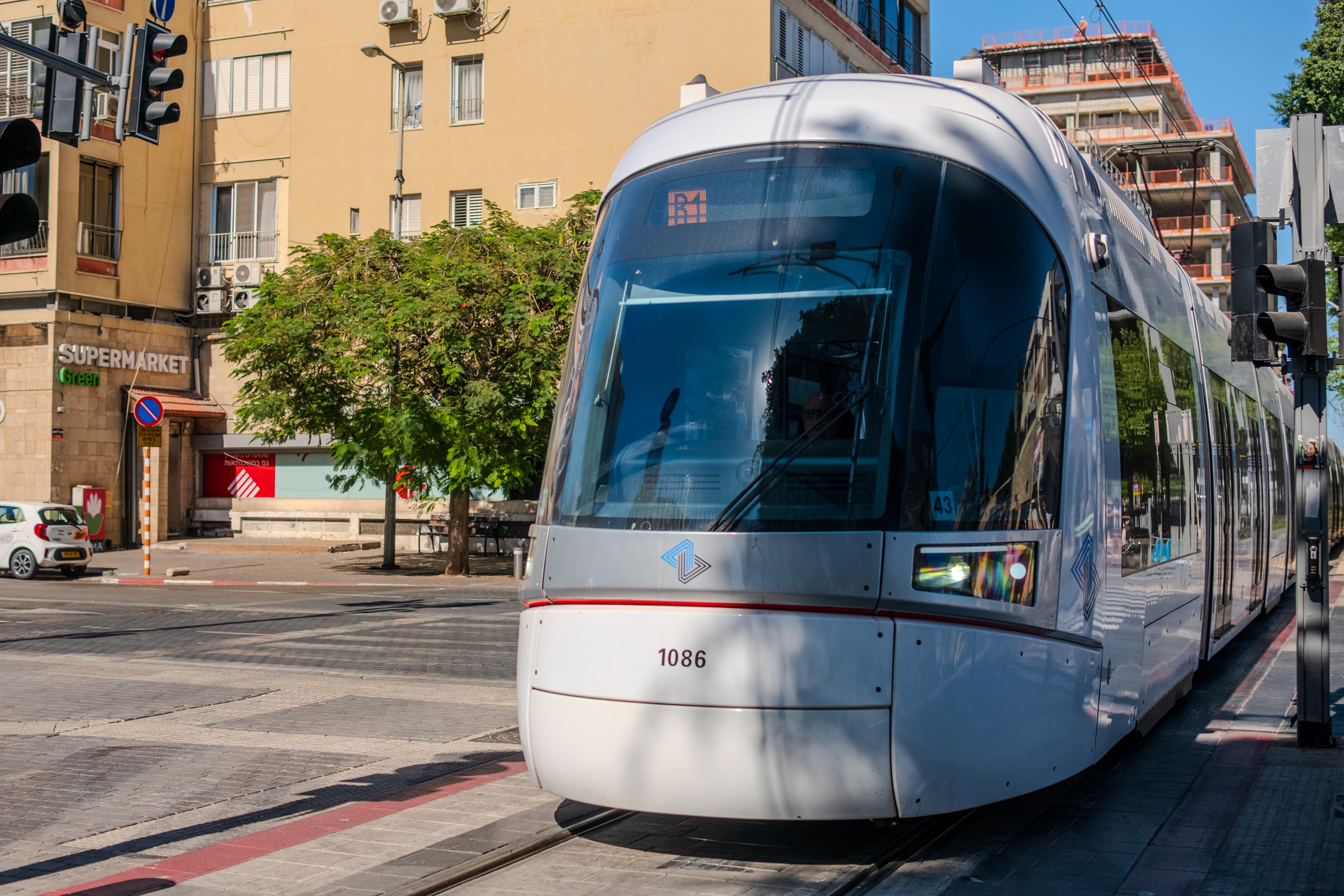
- Red line of the Tel Aviv Light Rail (Dankal), Jerusalem Boulevard

Overview
- Locale: (Israel) Tel Aviv, Petah Tikva, Bnei Brak, Ramat Gan, Bat Yam
- Termini: Petah Tikva Central Bus Station Kiryat Aryeh depot; HaKomemiyut (Bat Yam)
- Stations: 34
- Website: www.dankal.co.il/new-service-lines-and-stations/?lang=en

Service
- Type: Light rail
- System: Tel Aviv Light Rail
- Services: R1 - CBS Petah Tikva - HaKomemiyut; R2 - Kiryat Arye - HaKomemiyut; R3 - Kiryat Arye - Elifelet
- Operator: Tevel Metro
- Depot: Kiryat Aryeh depot
- Rolling stock: CRRC Changchun Railway Vehicles LRV
- Daily ridership: 70,000

History
- Opened: August 18, 2023

Technical
- Line length: 24 km (15 mi)
- Track gauge: 1,435 mm (4 ft 8 1/2 in) standard gauge
- Electrification: 1500 V DC OHLE
- Operating speed: 50 km/h (31 mph) in Street Level; 70 km/h (43 mph) Underground

The Red Line is a light rail line in the Tel Aviv-Yafo. Part of the Tel Aviv Light Rail, it is the first line of the system. The line runs from Bat Yam in the south to Petah Tikva in the northeast with a significant portion of it underground. The total cost of the red line is estimated at NIS 11 billion or, approximately US$3 billion. Construction began in 2011, with the testing phase of the line beginning only a decade later, in 2021. After numerous delays concerning the security and safety of the line, it eventually opened on August 18, 2023 with a 100,000+ daily ridership over just 8 hours of operation.

== Route ==
The Red Line has a total of 34 stations. It starts at Petah Tikva's Central Bus Station, east of Tel Aviv and follows Jabotinsky Road (Route 481) westwards at street level. At the point where Jabotinsky Road and Highway 4 intersect the line drops into a tunnel for 11 km (6.8 mi) and emerges to street level again just before Jaffa, where it turns southwards towards Bat Yam and also serves Bloomfield Stadium. The underground section includes 10 stations, including an interchange with Israel Railways services at Tel Aviv Savidor Central Railway Station and the nearby 2000 Terminal. The line also stops next to the Azrieli Center and the Tel Aviv HaShalom railway station. A maintenance depot, connected via a branch line and tunnel to the main section of the line, was constructed in Kiryat Aryeh, across from the existing Petah Tikva-Kiryat Aryeh railway station. The branch line includes two passenger stations, at Em HaMoshavot Road and an interchange station at the Kiryat Arye railway station.

A planned southern extension will add 2.8 km (1.7 mi) into the city of Rishon LeZion and three intermediate stops and an inter-modal terminus which will serve as connection with Israel Railways' Rishon LeZion Moshe Dayan Railway Station and the projected Green Line.

== Operations ==
The Red Line operates from Sundays to Thursdays from 05:00 with the last train departing at 00:30 the following day. On Fridays, the last train departs 3 hours before the commencement of Shabbat (meaning approximately 14:00 in the winter and 16:00 in the summer), and on Saturdays there is no service during daylight hours, until the end of Shabbat at sundown on Saturday evenings.

The price for a single ride is ₪8.00 For journeys beyond 15 km, the price for a single ride jumps to ₪16.

There are 45 trains on the line during operating times each with 2 carriages and with a maximum capacity of 450 passengers per train.

Waiting times in peak hours are approximately 3 minutes and off-peak hours the frequency will be 6 minutes per train. However, the frequency of the trains should increase as time goes by.

Eyal Gelberg is the voice behind the Red Line and announces all the stations in Hebrew and English (another voice then announces in Arabic). Gelberg is famous for being the voice behind many buses in Israel.

== Operator ==
In 2003, three consortia were short listed to build the line:

- Metropolitan Transportation Solution comprising Siemens, Africa Israel Investments, Egged, The Hague Tramways (HTM) and Aecom
- Adanim Group comprising Bombardier, Bouygues, RATP, Dan Bus Company and Properties & Construction
- Alstom: comprising Alstom CGEA, Ashtrom, Housing & Construction and Polar Investments

In December 2006, the concession to build and operate the Red Line was awarded to the Metropolitan Transportation Solution consortium.

In February 2007, the NIS 7.1 billion concession was a Build Operate Transfer (BOT) contract, the biggest private sector contract ever tendered in Israel's history. MTS's bid was just NIS 400 million under that of rival Metrorail, who bid NIS 7.5 billion.

=== Financing difficulties ===
In February 2007, the BOT agreement with the MTS consortium was signed and construction was to start a year later, in February 2008. However, the consortium was unable to secure the necessary financing and was given several extensions to the agreed timetable. The difficulties raising the funding was attributed to the 2008 financial crisis and specifically to the financial problems at Africa Israel Investments Group.

In November 2009, the Israeli government announced that it was considering canceling the agreement with the consortium and granted another extension until March 2010. It was announced that if funding is not secured by then, the government will consider other options for financing the railway, including the option of using public instead of private funding for the project. The deadline was then extended again to summer 2010 and in August the government, after extensive negotiations with MTS failed, finally canceled the MTS concession, though MTS indicated it would appeal the government's decision in arbitration proceeding.

=== NTA takes over ===
Following the cancellation of the MTS contract, the government announced that it would fund the construction directly from the Treasury and that NTA would manage subsequent phases of construction. As a result, NTA published a tender for the design of multiple launching shafts for the TBMs that would dig the 11 km of tunnels for the railway.

In March 2011, the shafts' construction tender was published as well, in addition to a tender for the design of the Kiryat Aryeh depot. The anticipated overall completion date of the railway was 31 December 2017. On December 20, 2010, the transfer of the entire project's management to NTA was approved by the project's arbitrators with MTS. On January 12, 2012, NTA published a pre-qualify (PQ) bid for the design-build contract for excavating the Red and Green lines' tunnels to be performed by several TBMs operating simultaneously.

From October 2021, Egged has been awarded the tender to operate and maintain the Tel Aviv Red Line by the NTA Metropolitan Mass Transit System Ltd. tenders committee. The winning bid was from the Tevel consortium controlled by Egged (51%) with Chinese companies Shenzhen Metro (30%) and CCECC (19%).

== Construction ==
The Red Line is the second underground service in Israel, after the Carmelit, in Haifa. The line is 24 km (15 mi) in length, with 34 stops, of which 10 are underground. The underground stations are equipped with platform screen doors and also trains in the underground section are operated via an automatic train operation system.

=== Preparatory works ===
Initial preparatory works began in 2007. NTA, the Government body responsible for the mass-transit development in the Tel Aviv region has spent several years performing utility relocation and right-of-way clearing for the railway. The bulk of the work however, including underground excavation, is to be carried out by the operator.

On April 10, 2008, works started on the conversion of part of the Jabotinsky Rd. in Petah Tikva into a sunken passage below Kaplan St.

As part of the preparatory works for the line, the main entrance to the Batei HaOsef museum in south Tel Aviv was cleared and relocated. The Bank HaPoalim branch on Herzl Street in the same area was also demolished.

=== TBM Shafts ===
In September 2011, work started on constructing three launching shafts for the TBMs

- Herzl Street shaft - located at the point where a cut and cover section ends and the tunneled section starts, used to launch TBMs in an easterly direction.
- Galei Gil car park shaft - located near the Ayalon Highway - used to launch TBMs in both easterly and westerly directions.
- Em HaMoshavot shaft - located near Highway 4 in Bnei Brak, used to launch TBMs in a westerly direction.

=== Tunnelling Works ===
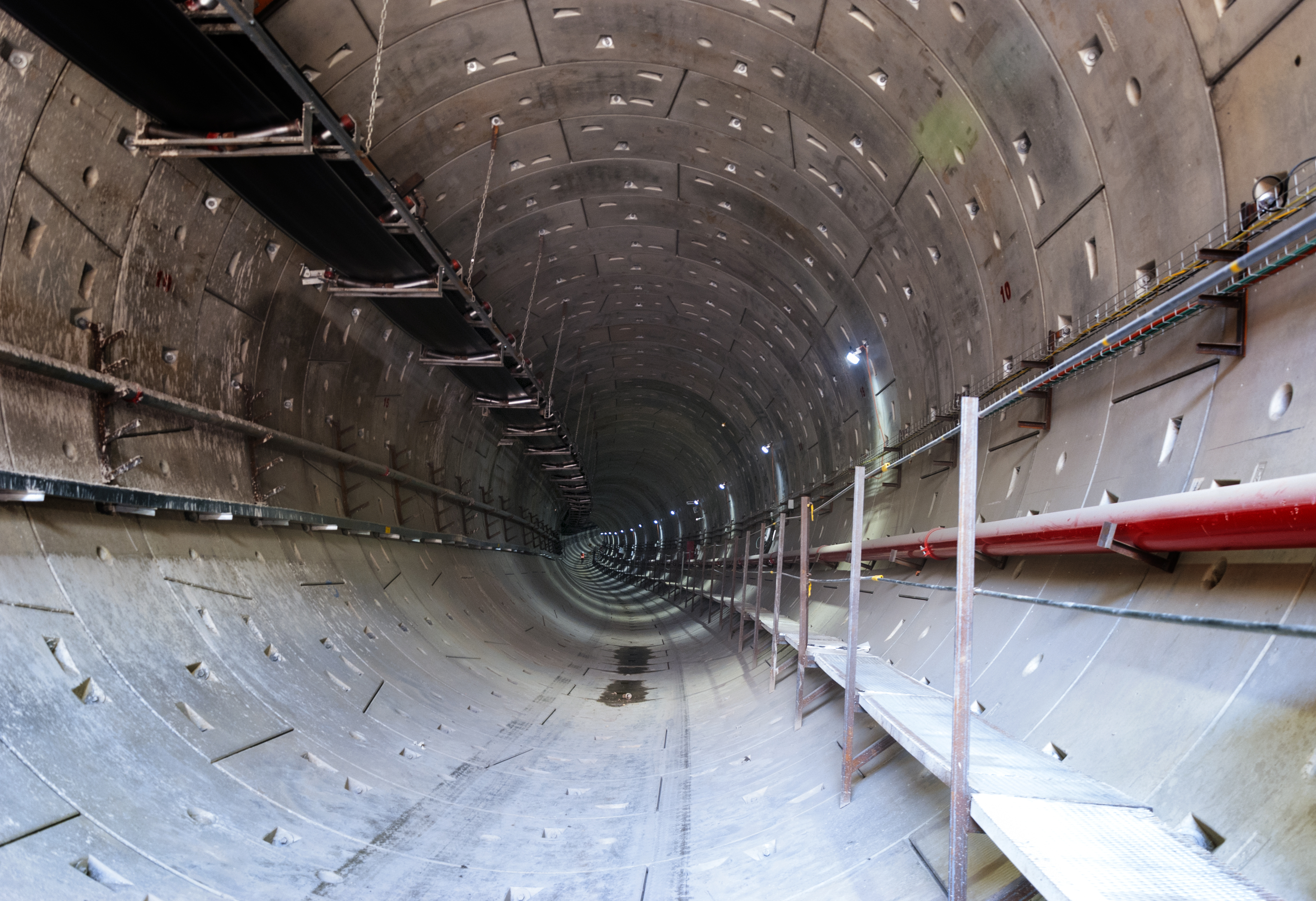
Eastern end of the Red Line tunnel at the depot in Petah Tikva

In May 2015, the companies Solel Boneh and China Railway Tunnel Group won the 2.9 Billion NIS tender to build two 5-kilometre (3.1 mi) tunnels and 6 underground stations in the western section of the Tel Aviv light rail's red line.

In June 2015, the companies Danya Cebus and China Civil Engineering Construction Corporation (CCECC) won the 700 Million NIS tender to build underground Carlebach station of the Tel Aviv light rail's red line.

By February 2017, most of the stations on the Red Line were already under construction.

=== Testing Phase ===
In 2021, the testing phase of the Red Line started after construction ended. The first trains started driving across the tracks.

In June 2023, during the testing phase, many problems involving the brakes of the trains suddenly stopping in the middle of the tracks became the center of attention in this phase. The mayor of Petah Tikva announced that the line would open in July 2023. The companies were desperately trying to fix this major issue that lead to severe delays to the lines opening date. Days later, the issue was fixed, and the line was approved by all security factors to begin operations in August 2023. The line opened on August 18, 2023.

=== Extensions ===
On December 5, 2022, the Ministry of Transportation allocated approximately NIS 100 million for the extension of the Red Line. This is for the purpose of detailed planning of a route from Bat Yam to the Rishon LeZion - Moshe Dayan train station. The planning extended the line by 2.5 kilometers, and included the construction of four new stations: Menachem Begin station, Koresh station, Rehavam Zaevi station and Shimon Israel station, which will be built near the Moshe Dayan interchange.

== Rolling stock ==
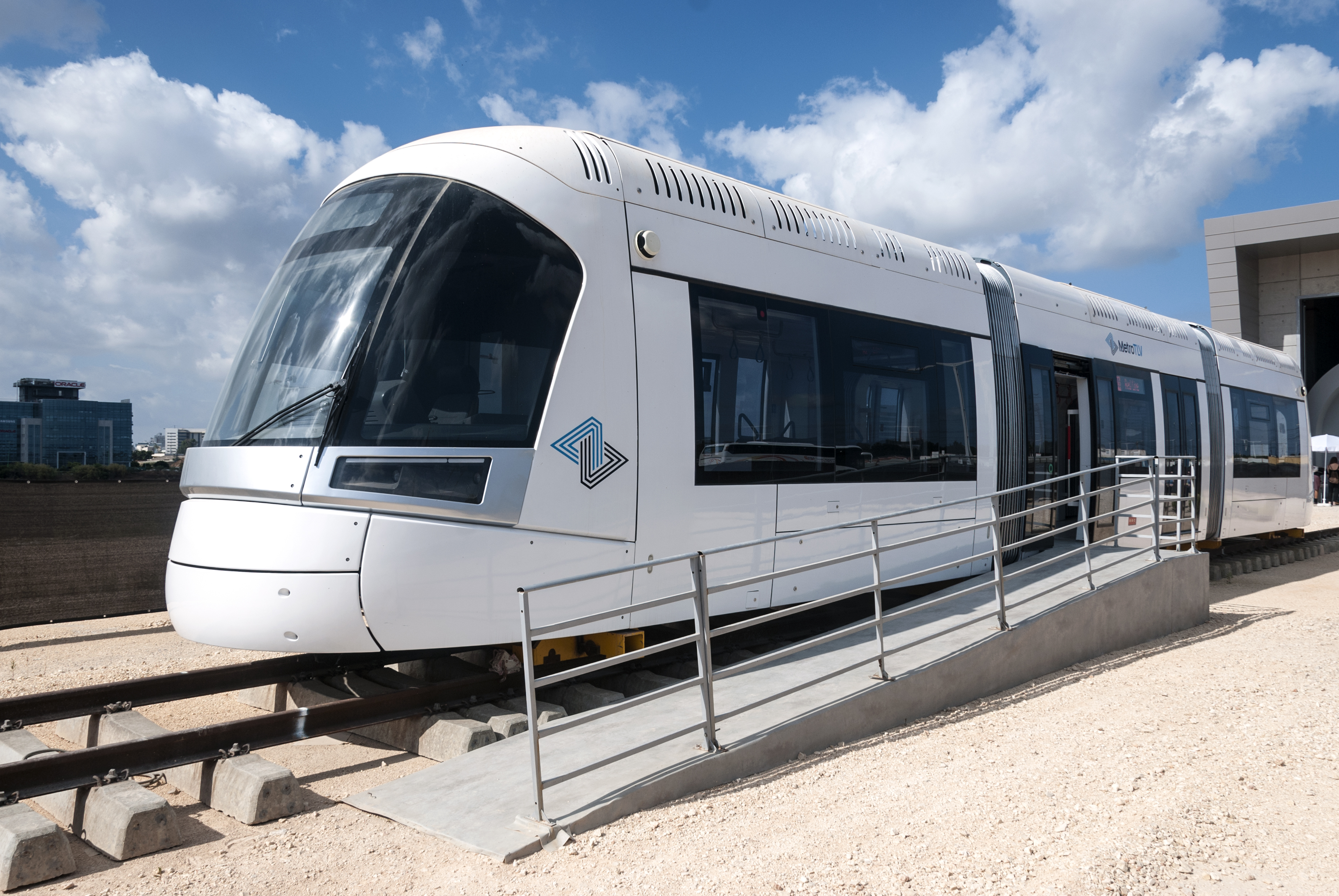
A reduced-size prototype of a Tel Aviv LRT trainset

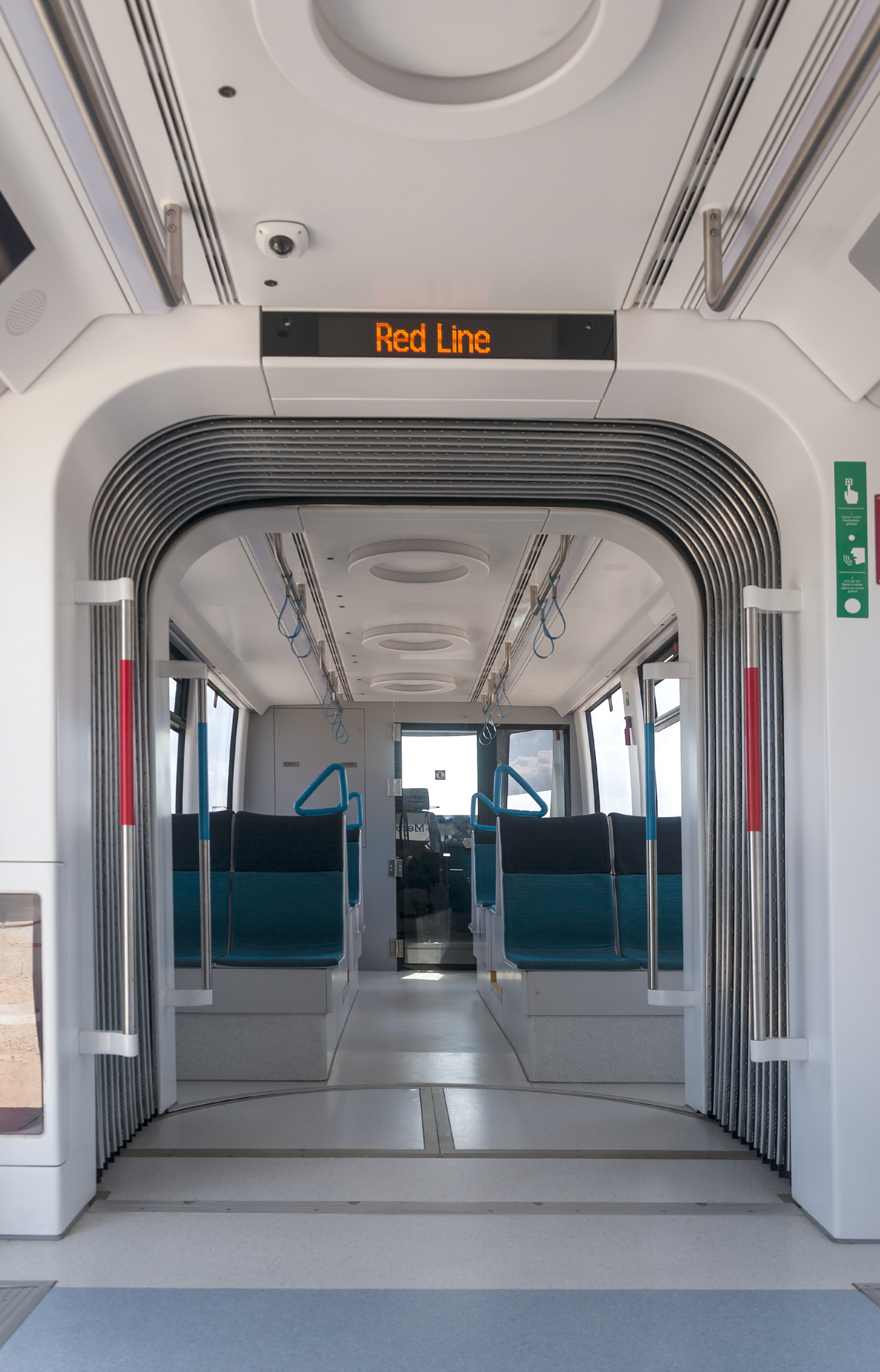
Tel Aviv LRT train interior

The Red Line trams are manufactured by CRRC Changchun Railway Vehicle Company. One LRV includes 5 modules, the configuration is Mc1+F1+Tp+F2+Msc1. The trams are uni-directional, and two vehicles must be combined into one trainset for operation. The vehicles comply with ISO, EN and Israeli standards.

== See also ==
- Tel Aviv Light Rail
- Jerusalem Light Rail
