= List of Israeli bus companies =

Below is a list of bus companies operating in Israel.

== Current ==
- Beit Shemesh Express (A subsidiary of Nativ Express)
- Dan BaDarom
- Dan Beersheba (A subsidiary of Dan BaDarom)
- Dan Bus Company
- Derech Egged (A subsidiary of Egged Bus Cooperative)
- Electra-Afikim
- G. B. Tours
- Galim (bus)
- Egged Bus Cooperative
- Egged Ta'avura
- Extra Public Transportation
- Kavim
- Metropoline
- UNBS
- Nativ Express
- Superbus
- Tour Bus
- Tnufa
- United Tours

== Former companies ==
- Connex
- Illit
- Metrodan
- Omni Express
- Dan BaTzafon
