= Rav-Kav =

Israeli public transportation pass

Rav-Kav רב-קו
- Front of a Rav-Kav card
- Location: Israel
- Launched: August 2007
- Technology: NFC; Contact chip
- Operator: Israeli Ministry of Transport and Road Safety
- Currency: Israeli shekel
- Stored-value: Pay as you go, Daily, monthly pass fares
- Validity: Israel Railways, Tel Aviv Light Rail; Jerusalem Light Rail; Carmelit, Haifa Technion cable car, Afikim, Dan, Dan BaDarom, Dan Beersheva, Egged, Galeem, GB Tours, Kavim, Extra Public Transport, Metropoline, Nateev Express, NTT (United Bus Services Nazareth), NTT (Nazareth Travel & Tourism), Rama Golan Regional Council, Superbus
- Website: ravkavonline.co.il, Public Transport Information, gov.il

Rav-Kav (Hebrew: רב-קו, lit. "multi-line") is a reusable contactless stored value smart card for making electronic payments as a joint fare collection system for the different public transportation operators across Israel.

Rav-Kav can be used in public transportation such as all bus companies, light rail trains including Tel Aviv Light Rail, Jerusalem Light Rail, Carmelit, as well as the national railway in Israel.

== History ==
Rav-Kav was first introduced in August 2007 by the Ministry of Transportation. Operations started on August 28, 2007, by Kavim, a small bus company serving the suburban cities of Kiryat Ono, Or Yehuda, Yehud and Petah Tikva, as well as several other destinations in the Jezreel Valley area in northern Israel. Several other small companies were to start offering Rav-Kav in the following months, however these were all delayed.

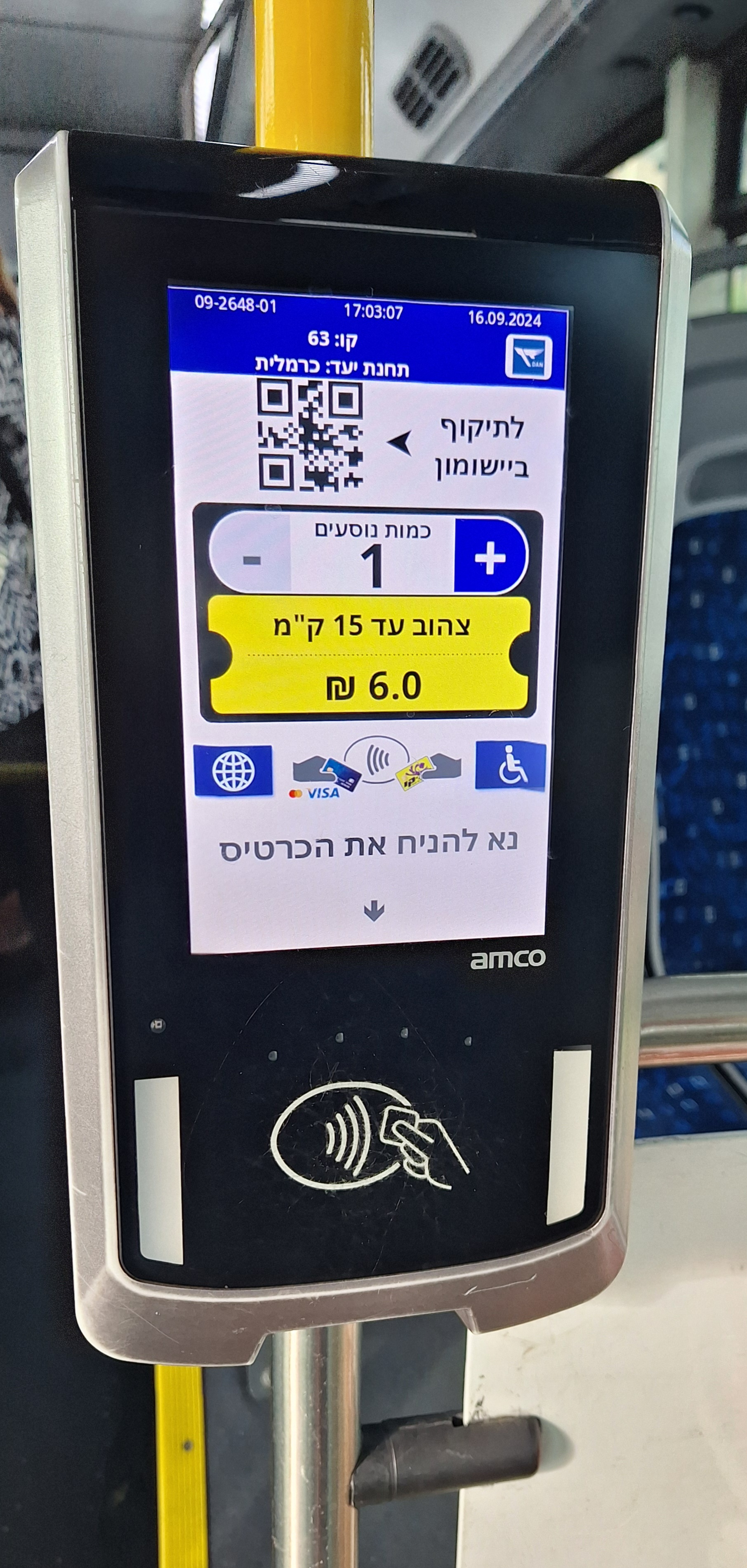
Rav-Kav validation machine in a Dan Company bus, 2024

The first major company to offer Rav-Kav was Dan, which serves many bus routes in the Tel Aviv Metropolitan Area. Although Dan was originally supposed to offer Rav-Kav to all passengers in August 2008, Dan only started limited service for student card holders in October, and full service started in January 2009. In March 2010, Dan stopped issuing paper monthly passes, which can now be purchased only as loadable contracts on a Rav-Kav.

Egged, the largest bus company in the country, did not have a final date set for the introduction of Rav-Kav at the time of its announcement. This was attributed to its large fleet of buses which required a longer integration period. On May 25, 2010, Egged started offering limited Rav-Kav services in the city of Rehovot. These services were later expanded to Karmiel and the Sharon areas, and they include monthly passes and special student and elderly discounts but not the pay as you go product. Egged has provided full Rav-Kav service in the Gush Dan Metropolitan Area starting on July 1, 2011, and joined the existing joint fare collection system between Kavim, Dan and Metropoline. Egged also started offering Rav-Kav service in Jerusalem and Haifa in July 2011.

Israel Railways also did not have a set date for the introduction, however the ministry's spokesman stated at the time of Rav-Kav's introduction that it would be within several months. Rav-Kav was fully integrated by Israel Railways in early 2012.

CityPass, the Jerusalem Light Rail operator, started offering Rav-Kav in May 2011, in advance of the opening of the first line in August. Cfir took over CityPass operations in August 2021.

The introduction of Rav-Kav cards are part of a larger effort to create bus priority in order to quicken the process of riding a bus and encourage people to use public transport over cars. The effort is being led by groups like Transport Today and Tomorrow, which aims to expand sustainable transportation in Israel.

Since 2019 in Jerusalem, and August 2022 in all other locations, Rav Kav is the main payment method on buses, whose drivers do not accept cash.

== Personalization ==
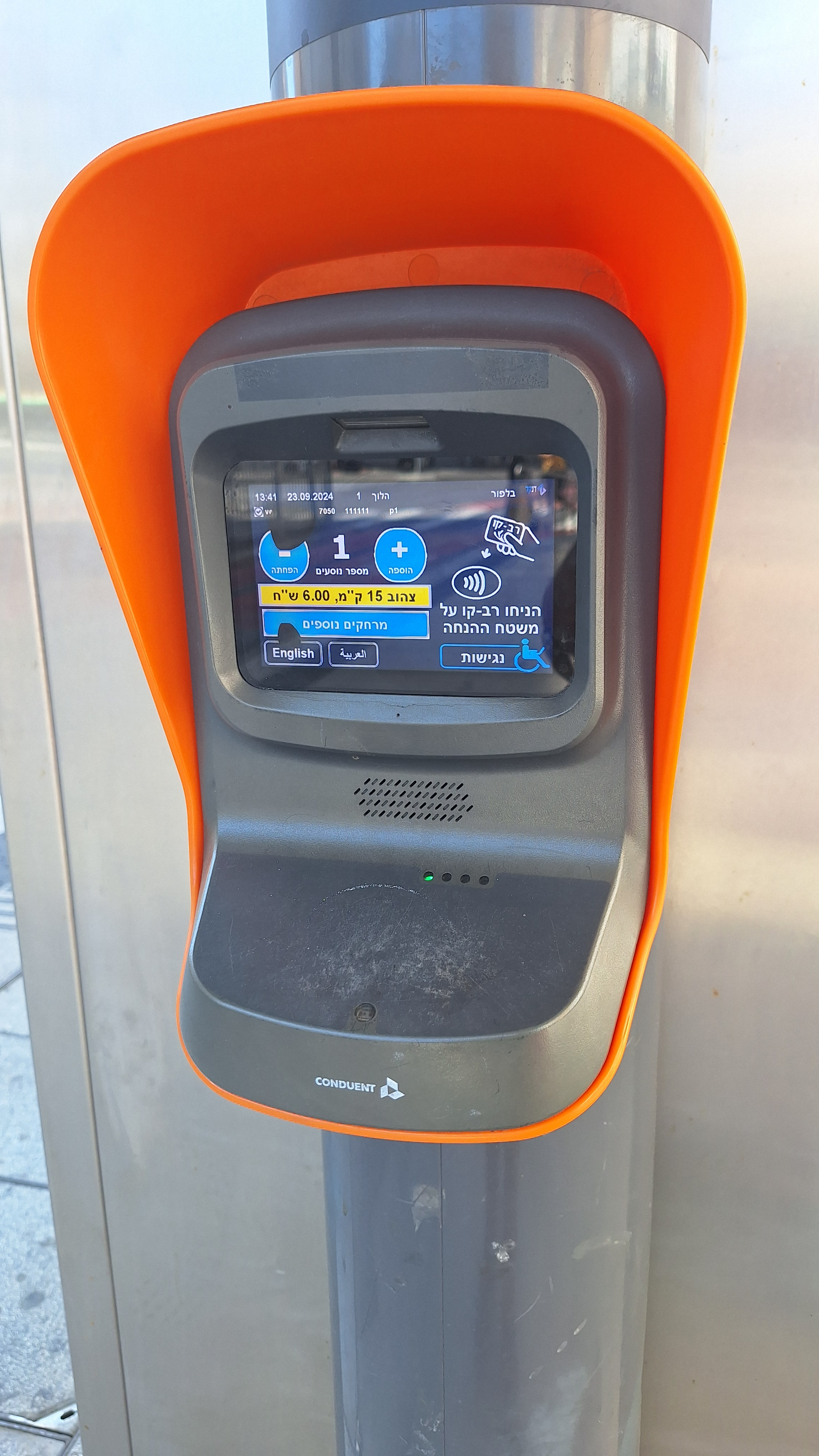
A Rav-Kav validation machine in a station of the Red Line of the Tel Aviv Light Rail, 2024

Rav-Kav cards can be either Personal, Semi-anonymous or Anonymous. Personal cards carry the passenger's name and picture, and allow the purchase of a wider variety of products such as monthly passes, student passes and senior-citizen passes. Also, Personalization provides insurance in case of a lost or stolen card. Personal and semi-personal cards can only be issued at the designated purchase points. Transactions carried out on personal cards are tracked, in order to provide the insurance - on report of a lost or stolen card, a new card is issued with the set of credits equivalent to the state of the card when last legitimately used. Data is also aggregated anonymously for statistical purposes.

== Recharge ==
Rav-Kav can be recharged either by an automatic machine by some bus stations, any Dankal and Cfir light rail stops, Israel Post, Convenience stores or dedicated web sites (ravkavonline.co.il or HopOn.co.il) and with the RavKav Online or the HopOn mobile apps (for iPhone (since iOS 13) and Android devices with NFC).

== Rav Kav service centers ==
There are 133 Rav Kav service centers in storefronts all around Israel. The locations are listed on recharge websites.

=== Joint fare collection ===
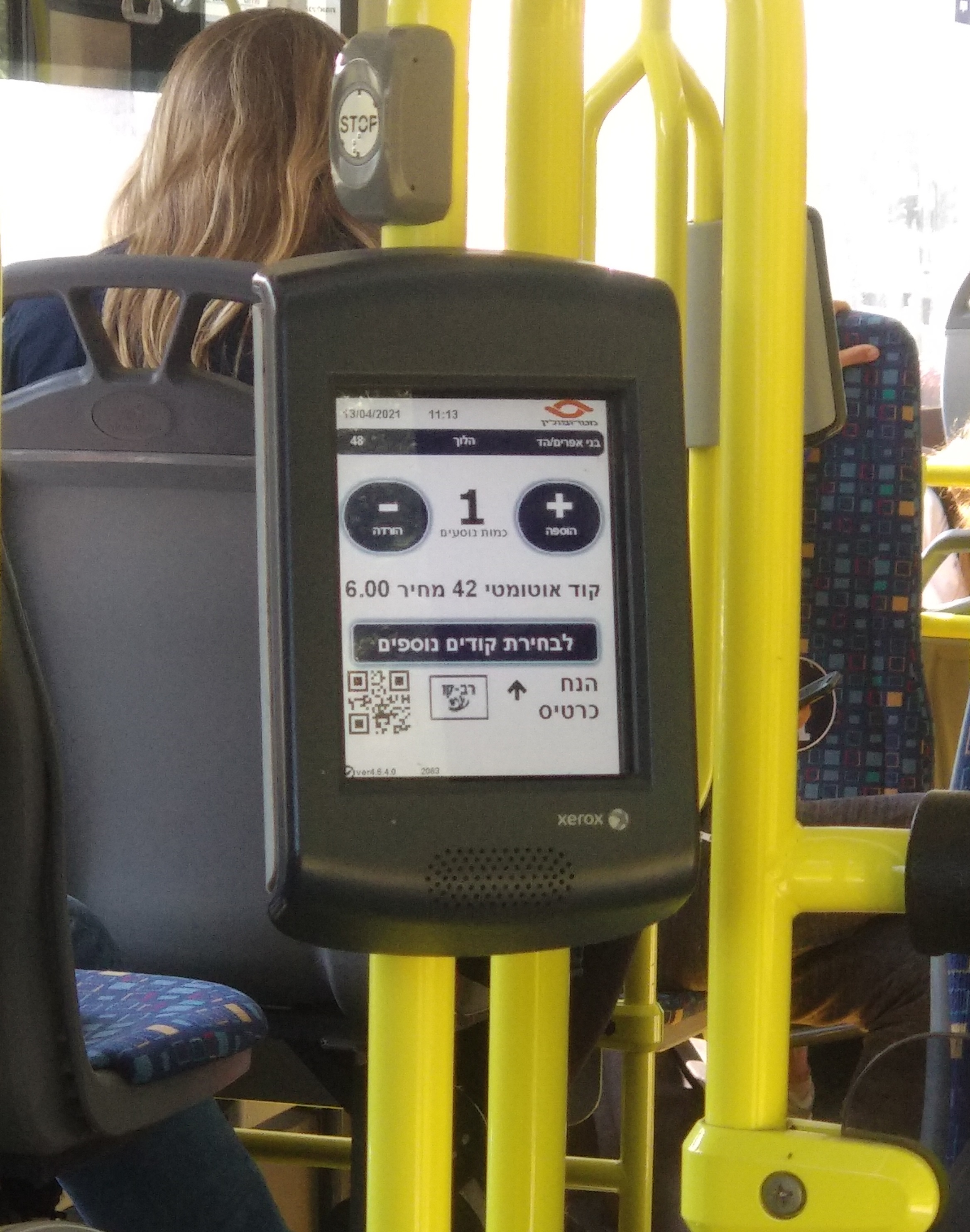
Rav-Kav validation machine in a Metropoline bus, 2021

The ongoing decentralization of Israel's bus network has created a market of a lot of different public transportation companies, and in some cases different companies provide services in the same area. This caused a problem for passengers who require the services of more than one company, since they had to pay separately for each company's services. Rav-Kav was expected to solve this problem as a joint fare collection system. Finally, after much delay, a temporary joint collection system was implemented on May 3, 2010, between the three bus companies currently providing service within Gush Dan- Dan, Kavim, and Metropoline (which only began operating in the area on this date with its acquisition of several bus lines from Dan serving the Sharon region). Customers can purchase pay-as-you-go credit and use it on any of the three companies in the area.

=== Sherut taxis ===
Share Taxis, known in Hebrew as Moniyyot Sherut, are a popular form of public transit in Israel, used for both regular commuting as well as occasional trips. The fares are comparable to competing bus routes. The Sherut Taxi Organization claims that leaving the taxis without Rav-Kav would harm their customers and the taxi companies, and that they had demanded to be included in Rav-Kav before the project began. The Ministry of Transportation expressed its support to include taxis in the project. In October 2011, a study was commenced to examine ways of integrating Rav-Kav for payment in Sheruts.
