= List of companies operating in West Bank settlements =

This is a list of companies operating in West Bank settlements, compiled by the UN Human Rights Council and published by the UN Office for the Coordination of Humanitarian Affairs (OCHA). Israeli settlements in the occupied territory of the West Bank, called by the Israeli occupant "Judea and Samaria Area", including East Jerusalem, are considered illegal under international law.

The report was requested by Human Rights Council resolution 31/36 in follow up to the International Fact-Finding Mission on Israeli Settlements, a 2013 investigation into the impact of Israeli settlements on Palestinian rights in the occupied territories, and listed ten activities of concern, including the supply of construction equipment, materials, services and utilities to settlements, and to erect the West Bank wall; financial support for settlement activities; and, the supply of demolition equipment used to destroy property and agricultural assets.

There were originally 112 business entities on the list for which, based on "a thorough review and assessment of all information available", there was considered "reasonable grounds to conclude, had been involved in one or more of those activities". In 2023, an update was published, which removed 15 companies from the list, leaving 97. In 2025, OHCHR published an update of the database listing 158 business enterprises. In 2026, an additional update was published showing 241 businesses, adding 61 companies to a database of businesses from 11 countries.

The list includes mostly Israeli companies, but also includes prominent international firms, such as the US-based travel companies Airbnb, Booking.com, Expedia and TripAdvisor, US tech company Motorola Solutions, France’s Egis Rail and the British construction equipment manufacturer JCB. Of the entities remaining on the list in 2023, 81 were domiciled in Israel, and 16 in five other states: the United States (5), the Netherlands (4), the UK (3), France (3) and Luxembourg (1).

In its report, the UN Human Rights Council noted that the companies flagged by the list were all responsible for activities that “raised particular human rights concerns”. Michelle Bachelet, the UN High Commissioner for Human Rights, said the report was not a “blacklist”, while her office noted that it “does not provide a legal characterization of the activities in question, or of business enterprises’ involvement in them.”

On 5 July 2021, Norway’s largest pension fund KLP, said it has divested itself of 16 companies that appeared on the list saying "There is an unacceptable risk that the excluded companies will contribute to the violation of human rights in war and conflict situations through their connection to the Israeli settlements in the occupied West Bank".

== Listed Activities ==
The Independent fact finding mission, pursuant to the Human Rights Council resolution 19/17 defines the following listed activities:

1. The supply of equipment and materials facilitating the construction and the expansion of settlements and the wall, and associated infrastructure;
2. The supply of surveillance and identification equipment for settlements, the wall and checkpoints directly linked with settlements;
3. The supply of equipment for the demolition of housing and property, the destruction of agricultural farms, greenhouses, olive groves and crops;
4. The supply of security services, equipment and materials to enterprises operating in settlements;
5. The provision of services and utilities supporting the maintenance and existence of settlements, including transport;
6. Banking and financial operations helping to develop, expand or maintain settlements and their activities, including loans for housing and the development of businesses;
7. The use of natural resources, in particular water and land, for business purposes;
8. Pollution, and the dumping of waste in or its transfer to Palestinian villages;
9. Captivity of the Palestinian financial and economic markets, as well as practices that disadvantage Palestinian enterprises, including through restrictions on movement, administrative and legal constraints;
10. The use of benefits and reinvestments of enterprises owned totally or partially by settlers for developing, expanding and maintaining the settlements.

== List of companies operating in West Bank settlements (2025) ==
Below are the 158 companies operating in Israeli Occupied Territories including East Jerusalem, and their home countries, as listed in the 2025 report:

No.	Business enterprise	Listed activity	Home state
1	A. Barkan and Partners Ltd.	(a), (g)	Israel
2	Ackerstein Industries Ltd.	(a)	Israel
3	ACS Actividades de Construcción y Servicios S.A.	(g)	Spain
4	Ahava – Dead Sea Laboratories Ltd.	(g)	Israel
5	Airbnb	(e)	United States
6	Alon Blue Square Israel Ltd.	(e), (g)	Israel
7	Altice International Ltd.	(e), (g)	Luxembourg
8	Amir Marketing and Investments in Agriculture Ltd.	(g)	Israel
9	Amos Hadar Properties and Investments Ltd.	(g)	Israel
10	Amot Investments Ltd.	(g)	Israel
11	Anglo Saxon Real Estate Agency (Israel 1992) Ltd.	(e), (g)	Israel
12	Archivists Ltd.	(g)	Israel
13	Ashtrom Group	(g)	Israel
14	Ashtrom Industries Ltd.	(g)	Israel
15	Ashtrom Residential Development Ltd.	(e), (g)	Israel
16	B. Gaon Holdings Ltd.	(a)	Israel
17	Bank Hapoalim	(e), (f), (g)	Israel
18	Bank Leumi	(e), (f), (g)	Israel
19	Bank of Jerusalem	(e), (f), (g)	Israel
20	Barad Earthworks, Development and Roadworks Ltd.	(a), (e)	Israel
21	Bar-Amana Buildings Construction and Development Company Ltd.	(a), (e)	Israel
22	Baran Group Ltd.	(e)	Israel
23	Bardarian Brothers Ltd.	(a), (e), (g)	Israel
24	Beit Haarchiv Ltd.	(g)	Israel
25	Bezeq	(e), (g)	Israel
26	Boneich Construction Development & Investments Ltd.	(a), (g)	Israel
27	Booking Holdings	(e)	United States
28	Booking.com	(e)	Netherlands
29	Brothers Hasid Construction Contracting Company Ltd.	(a), (e), (g)	Israel
30	C. Mer Industries Ltd.	(b), (e)	Israel
31	Café Café Israel Ltd.	(e), (g)	Israel
32	Caliber 3 Ltd.	(d), (g)	Israel
33	Cellcom	(e), (g)	Israel
34	Cherriessa Ltd.	(g)	Israel
35	Cim Lustigman Development and Construction Ltd.	(g)	Israel
36	CityBook Services Ltd.	(g)	Israel
37	Comasco Ltd.	(a), (c)	Israel
38	Construcciones y Auxiliar de Ferrocarriles S.A. (CAF)	(a), (e), (g)	Spain
39	D.N. Kol-Gader Ltd.	(g)	Israel
40	Dalia Elispur Construction Contracting Company 1972 Ltd.	(a), (g)	Israel
41	Dan Public Transportation Company Ltd.	(a), (e), (g)	Israel
42	Danya Cebus Ltd.	(a), (e), (g)	Israel
43	Davidov Garages Ltd.	(e), (g)	Israel
44	Db Billiards Ltd.	(e), (g), (j)	Israel
45	Delek Group	(e), (g)	Israel
46	Delta Galil Industries	(g)	Israel
47	Delta Israel Brands Ltd.	(g)	Israel
48	Dor Alon	(e), (g)	Israel
49	EPR Systems Ltd.	(e), (g)	Israel
50	E.T. Legal Services Ltd.	(c), (e)	Israel
51	Egged	(e)	Israel
52	Egis	(e)	France
53	Egis Rail	(e)	France
54	Einav Hahetz 1965 Ltd.	(g)	Israel
55	Elco Ltd.	(a), (e), (g)	Israel
56	Electra Afikim Ltd.	(e)	Israel
57	Electra Group Ltd.	(e), (g)	Israel
58	Elyakim Ben-Ari Ltd.	(g)	Israel
59	Euro-Israel (Y.S.) Ltd.	(a), (g)	Israel
60	Expedia Group	(e)	United States
61	Export Investment Company Ltd.	(e), (f), (g)	Israel
62	Extal Ltd.	(g)	Israel
63	Extra Retail Group Ltd.	(e), (g)	Israel
64	Field Produce Ltd.	(g)	Israel
65	Field Produce Marketing Ltd.	(g)	Israel
66	First International Bank of Israel	(e), (f), (g)	Israel
67	Fosun	(g)	China
68	Gadish Engineering Company Ltd. (Gadish Group)	(a), (e), (g)	Israel
69	Galnor Construction and Development Ltd.	(a), (e)	Israel
70	Galshan Shvakim Ltd.	(e)	Israel
71	Geo-Da – Lands & Property Management & Information Ltd.	(e)	Israel
72	Greenkote P.L.C.	(g)	United Kingdom
73	Greenmix, of Benny and Tzvika Group Ltd.	(g)	Israel
74	Haim Zaken Construction & Investments Ltd.	(a), (e), (g)	Israel
75	Hamat Group Ltd.	(g)	Israel
76	Hanson Israel	(g)	Israel
77	Harsa Studio – Sanitaryware Manufacturers Ltd.	(g)	Israel
78	Heidelberg Materials	(g)	Germany
79	Hot Mobile	(e), (g)	Israel
80	Hot Telecommunication Systems Ltd.	(e), (g)	Israel
81	Impact Property Development Ltd.	(e), (g)	Israel
82	Ingeniería y Economía del Transporte S.M.E. M.P, S.A. (Ineco)	(e)	Spain
83	Israel Discount Bank	(e), (f)	Israel
84	Israel Railways	(g), (h)	Israel
85	Italek Ltd.	(e), (g)	Israel
86	J.C. Bamford Excavators Ltd.	(a), (c)	United Kingdom
87	Kass – C Ltd.	(a), (e), (g)	Israel
88	Kavim	(e), (g)	Israel
89	Kfar Giladi Quarries Agricultural Cooperative Association Ltd.	(g)	Israel
90	Kiriat Sefer (Diur Modyin) Ltd.	(g)	Israel
91	Kotler Adika Building Company Ltd.	(a), (g)	Israel
92	Lapidoth Capital Ltd.	(a), (e), (g)	Israel
93	Magen – Construction Engineering Works Ltd.	(a), (e), (g)	Israel
94	Margolin Bros. Engineering & Consulting Ltd.	(a), (e), (g)	Israel
95	Marom Tuval – Consulting, Management & Investments Ltd.	(e)	Israel
96	Matrix IT	(e), (g)	Israel
97	Mayer’s Cars and Trucks Co. Ltd.	(e), (g)	Israel
98	Medan – Roads and Quarries (1964) Ltd.	(a), (g)	Israel
99	Mega Or	(g)	Israel
100	Mekorot	(e), (g)	Israel
101	Mercantile Discount Bank	(e), (f)	Israel
102	Merkavim Transportation Technologies Ltd.	(e)	Israel
103	Mery Building Works Contracting Company Ltd.	(g)	Israel
104	Metrontario Investments Ltd.	(g)	Canada
105	Minrav Group Ltd.	(g)	Israel
106	Mishab Housing Construction & Development Company Ltd.	(a), (g)	Israel
107	Mishkan Eliyahu – Construction and Investment Company Ltd.	(a), (g)	Israel
108	Mivne Real Estate KD Ltd.	(g)	Israel
109	Mizrachi & Sons Investments Group Ltd.	(a), (g)	Israel
110	Mizrahi-Tefahot Bank	(e), (g)	Israel
111	Modi'in Ezrachi	(d), (e), (g)	Israel
112	Mordechai Aviv 1973 Ltd.	(g)	Israel
113	Motorola Solutions Israel	(d), (e)	Israel
114	Motorola Solutions	(d), (e)	United States
115	N.O.H. Management and Consulting Ltd.	(g)	Israel
116	Natoon – Nof Yam Security Ltd.	(d), (e)	Israel
117	New Way Traffic Ltd.	(a), (e)	Israel
118	Ofertex Industries 1997 Ltd.	(g)	Israel
119	Olenik Transportation Earth Work and Road Constructions Ltd.	(a), (e)	Israel
120	Oron Group	(a), (e), (g)	Israel
121	Partner Communications	(e), (g)	Israel
122	Paz Retail and Energy Ltd.	(e), (g)	Israel
123	Pelephone	(e), (g)	Israel
124	Powergen Solar A Ltd.	(a), (e)	Israel
125	Proffimat S.R Ltd.	(g)	Israel
126	Rami Levy Hashikma Marketing	(e), (g)	Israel
127	Rami Levy Communications	(e), (g)	Israel
128	Re/Max Holdings, Inc.	(e), (g)	United States
129	Rotshtein Real Estate Ltd.	(g)	Israel
130	S.A.G. (Velvel) Building & Development Ltd.	(a), (g)	Israel
131	Salomon A. Angel Ltd.	(e), (g)	Israel
132	Sarfati Shimon Ltd.	(a), (g)	Israel
133	Shahar Co. – Civil Engineering, Construction and Infrastructure Company Ltd.	(a), (g)	Israel
134	Shalgal Food Ltd.	(g)	Israel
135	Shapir Engineering and Industry	(a), (e), (g)	Israel
136	Shikun & Binui	(e)	Israel
137	Shikun & Binui – Solel Boneh – Infrastructure Ltd.	(a), (e)	Israel
138	Shlomo Cohen Construction Company Ltd.	(a), (g)	Israel
139	Shoham Engineering and Development Ltd.	(a), (e), (g)	Israel
140	Shufersal	(e), (g)	Israel
141	Sociedad Espanola De Montajes Industriales S.A. (SEMI)	(g)	Spain
142	Sonol	(e), (g)	Israel
143	Steconfer S.A.	(a), (e)	Portugal
144	Superbus	(e)	Israel
145	Supergum Industries 1969 Ltd.	(g)	Israel
146	The American Israeli Gas Corporation Ltd. (Amisragas)	(e), (g)	Israel
147	TripAdvisor, Inc.	(e)	United States
148	Twitoplast Ltd.	(g)	Israel
149	Unikowsky Maoz Ltd.	(g)	Israel
150	Villar International Ltd.	(g)	Israel
151	Y.A.Z (Yaaz) – Construction and Development Company Ltd.	(c)	Israel
152	Y.D. Barazani Ltd.	(a), (g)	Israel
153	Yacobi Brothers Group (YSB) Ltd.	(e), (g)	Israel
154	Yes TV and Communications Services Ltd.	(e)	Israel
155	Z.F. Building Company Ltd.	(g)	Israel
156	Zakai Agricultural Know-how and Inputs Ltd.	(g)	Israel
157	Z.M.H. Hammerman Ltd.	(e), (g)	Israel
158	Zriha Hlavin Industries Ltd.	(g)	Israel

== List of companies operating in West Bank settlements (2026) ==
Below are the 241 companies operating in Israeli Occupied Territories including East Jerusalem, and their home countries, as listed in the 2026 updated report:

No.	Business enterprise	Listed activity	Home state
1	A. Barkan and Partners Ltd.	(a), (g)	Israel
2	Absoluteskin Cosmetics (Pty) Ltd.	(g)	South Africa
3	Ackerstein Industries Ltd.	(a)	Israel
4	Adama Agricultural Solutions Ltd.	(a), (e)	Israel
5	Adama Ltd.	(a), (e)	China
6	Africa Israel Investment Ltd.	(a), (e), (g)	Israel
7	Agrifood Marketing Ltd.	(e), (g)	Israel
8	Ahava – Dead Sea Laboratories Ltd.	(g)	Israel
9	Airbnb Inc.	(e)	United States
10	All-In Trade Israel Ltd.	(e), (g), (h)	Israel
11	Alon Blue Square Israel Ltd.	(e), (g)	Israel
