= Illit (disambiguation) =

Illit is a South Korean girl group.

Illit may also refer to:

- A component of some Hebrew toponyms, meaning "upper"
- Illit (company), a defunct Israeli bus company
