= Monsuno =

2012 Japanese-American animated TV series

- English title card
- Genre: Science fantasy; Adventure; Action
- Directed by: Yoshiaki Okumura
- Voices of: Cam Clarke; Karen Strassman; Christopher Corey Smith; Kirk Thornton; Keith Silverstein
- Opening theme: American version: "Monsuno" by Far East Movement (1–26) "Combat Chaos" by SoulJa (27–65); Japanese version: "MONSUNO!" by Rey (1–26) "SPIN GO!" by Rey (27–52)
- Ending theme: American version: "Monsuno" by Far East Movement (1–65); Japanese version: "Jounetsu Element" by SV TRIBE (1–26) "Onaji Sekai de" by Rey (27–52)
- Composer: Michael Tavera
- Countries of origin: United States; Japan
- Original languages: English; Japanese
- No. of seasons: 3
- No. of episodes: 65 (list of episodes)

Production
- Executive producers: Jeremy Padawer; Stephen Berman; Marc Harrington; Hiroaki Muto; Yuma Sakata
- Producers: Jared Wolfson; Chapman Maddox; Jon Hudson; Yukio Kusumoto
- Animator: Larx Entertainment
- Running time: 22 minutes
- Production companies: Pacific Animation Partners LLC; Dentsu Entertainment USA; Jakks Entertainment; FremantleMedia Enterprises

Original release
- Network: Nicktoons (USA, 1–52); Hulu (USA, 53–65); TV Tokyo (Japan, 1–52)
- Release: February 23, 2012 – July 1, 2014

Monsuno, released as Jūsen Battle Monsuno (Japanese: 獣旋バトルモンスーノ, Hepburn: Jūsen Batoru Monsūno; "Spin Beast Battle Monsuno") in Japan, is an animated series produced by Pacific Animation Partners LLC, a joint venture between Dentsu Entertainment USA (part of Dentsu Aegis Network), Jakks Pacific, and FremantleMedia Enterprises, in association with The Topps Company with animation production done by Larx Entertainment in Japan. The series premiered in the United States on Nicktoons on February 23, 2012. and began airing on TV Tokyo in Japan in October 2012, with global launches staggered by country sometime between mid-2012 and early 2013 through Nickelodeon.

== Synopsis ==
=== Season 1: World Master ===
The show revolves around "re-awakened Monster DNA called Monsuno" that finds its way into the unsuspecting hands of adventure-seeking teenagers Chase, Jinja, and Bren. Accompanied by their Monsuno, Lock, Charger, and Quickforce, they are searching for Chase's father Jeredy Suno, the creator of the Monsuno. They are soon joined by Beyal, a monk from the Himalayas along with his Monsuno Glowblade. Beyal often speaks of five people that with the help of their Monsuno, could change the world. It just so happens that they are that five, along with Dax, a teenager who along with his Monsuno Airswitch, opposes the team and is disliked among most people. The team has yet to befriend him and persuade him to join their cause. They are also on the run from a H.A.M.M.E.R.-type agency called "S.T.O.R.M." (Strategic Tactical Operatives for Recovery of Monsuno) led by Marshall Charlemagne, whose plans are still in question, and Dr. Emanuel Klipse, a malevolent scientist who has his own nefarious plans.

=== Season 2: Combat Chaos ===
Five thrill-seeking teenagers have once again entered the Monsuno battle. This time, following the disappearance or abduction of Jeredy Suno, who has now officially returned. But along with old foes, new enemies have also emerged. Among them are The Forge Resistance—a manufacturing organization hell-bent on destroying the world using 'Wild Core' bombs; The S.T.O.R.M. Strike Squad—a team handpicked by Charlemagne; The Hand of Destiny—a group from an ancient, centuries-old tribe that went into hiding underground long ago; and Six, a teenage clone of Dr. Eclipse.

=== Season 3 ===
The series continues after the events of Monsuno: Combat Chaos, with the introduction of Core-Tech and S.T.O.R.M's merging, Eklipse and Forge Resistance with the newly-manufactured Dino Monsuno, and return of Hand of Destiny with their new non-shapeshifting alien Monsunos. The three survived members of the Hand have been reverted to children- Petros, Terz and Dasha now work with Digby Droog. There are also some returning characters from Season 1, like the Bookman and Grandma Future. With the help of their new Hyper Monsuno, Team Core-Tech may stand a chance against their adversaries.

== Characters ==
The characters are accompanied by Monsunos (giant high-tech/mechanical/armored hybrid monsters of one or more animal species), which are contained in cylinder regeneration chamber capsules known as "cores".

- Chase Suno (チェイス・スーノ, Cheisu Sūno) (voiced by Cam Clarke in English and by Kenn in Japanese) – One of the main protagonists. A brave and adventurous 14-year old boy, Chase is the leader of Team Core-Tech. In the first season "World Masters", Chase engages on a journey to find his father Jeredy Suno, a research scientist who disappeared while experimenting with the mysterious power source called Monsuno Essence which brought him into conflict with both the corrupt government agency S.T.O.R.M. and the rogue scientist Dr. Klipse. In the second season "Combat Chaos" Chase is repeatedly having visions of his mother Sophia who was believed to be deceased which leaves him to confront The Hand of Destiny which might have a hand at Sofia's disappearance.
- Jinja (voiced by Karen Strassman in English and by Asami Tano in Japanese) – One of the main protagonists, renamed Vicky (ビッキー, Bikkī) in the Japanese version. Jinja is the self-proclaimed "sassy" and genuinely outspoken tomboy member of Team Core-Tech who is often the first one into battle. Jinja is a strong supporter to Chase in his journeys and is known to playfully tease Bren on occasion. Jinja was at first interested in Beyal and had no fear of showing it. In the second and third season she was more comfortable and calm about it.
- Bren (ブレン, Buren) (voiced by Christopher Corey Smith in English and by Chihiro Suzuki in Japanese) – One of the main protagonists. A timid but inquisitive boy who's an adept computer programmer and hacker. Bren is one of Chase's closest friends and is usually the one to kaiser or decode any piece of Technology or Monsuno Equipment that Team Core-Tech comes across. Bren has a bit of a playfully antagonistic relationship with Jinja.
- Beyal (voiced by Kirk Thornton in English and by Sachi Kokuryu in Japanese) – A supporting protagonist. He was renamed Noah (ノア, Noa) in the Japanese version. An introspective and spiritual young man, Beyal was introduced in the episode "Knowledge" as a monk who possesses "The Monsuno Sight"; A special ability that allows one to see into the future. Beyal helped Chase, Bren, and Jinja escape from The Bookman's evil clutches and joined Team Core-Tech afterwards. He was a good friend of Dax, since they were the last members who joined the team. His wide spectrum of knowledge, his alternative methods and his intense emotions have aided in tackling difficult situations and making him the most beloved character of the series. Beyal is attracted to Jinja although he does not admit it aloud.
- Dax (voiced by Keith Silverstein in English by Hiroshi Shimozaki in Japanese) – A cocky young drifter that joined Team Core-Tech in the episode "R.S.P.V.". Dax has a mysterious past that might tie into Dr. Klipse's illegal Monsuno research. In the original English version, he has a bit of an Australian accent. Renamed Ash (アッシュ, Asshu) in the Japanese version. Dax enjoys making fun of Bren, since they are not fond of each other a lot. On the contrary, he likes gibing Beyal even though he is jealous of his relationship with Jinja. Having experienced the cruelty of street life, Dax has become impulsive and shrewd.

== Episodes ==
Season	Episodes	Originally released (U.S. (Note: TV Tokyo in Japan aired the second season before the United States. All series overview dates reflect its American release.))	
Season	Episodes	First released	Last released
1	26	February 23, 2012	November 21, 2012
2	26	April 21, 2013	May 25, 2014
3	13	July 1, 2014	

The series premiered on February 23, 2012, with the first two episodes "Clash" and "Courage" as a back-to-back one-hour special.

== Development and Broadcast ==
The series first started development in 2008 through Dentsu subsidiary DCI-LA and toy company Jakks Pacific. Jakks and Dentsu Entertainment USA officially announced the series in January 2010 with a fifty-two-episode order for a 2011 delivery cycle in North America. It would form as Jakks Pacific's first original entertainment-based IP, and would handle global toy rights to the property. In June 2010, FremantleMedia Enterprises joined the series' production under their newly-formed Kids & Family Entertainment division, which would act as the master licensing agent and distributor outside Asia, of which Dentsu would handle. In October, the venture between the three companies, Pacific Animation Partners, announced that The Topps Company had joined as a licensing partner and obtained trading card and confectionery rights.

In June 2011, Pacific Animation Partners entered into a global pay-TV broadcast distribution deal with Nickelodeon, of which the series would air on respective networks in Latin America, Europe, Australia and New Zealand, India, Southeast Asia, Russia and Africa, while airing on Nicktoons in the United States.

Topps launched a trading card game based on the series in March 2012. In June, FremantleMedia Enterprises pre-sold free-TV rights to CITV (United Kingdom), K2 (Italy), Clan (Spain), Spacetoon (Middle East) and Go! (Australia). They also signed a pay-TV deal with YTV for Canada.

China's broadcast premiered on CCTV-14, starting with the first series on 15 May 2017.

=== Home media ===
In Australia, FremantleMedia Enterprises and Roadshow Entertainment released three DVDs, consisting of the entirety of Series 1 in 2012 and the first half of Series 2 in 2013.

In the United Kingdom, Fremantle Home Entertainment released a single DVD entitled "The Battle Begins" on 15 October 2012, containing the first seven episodes of the series.

In November 2012, FremantleMedia Enterprises signed a home video deal with Shout! Factory in the United States. The first volume, "Destiny", was released on January 8, 2013 while the second, "Power", was released on May 21, 2013, and the third, "Combat Chaos", was released on August 27, 2013.
