= Merkabah (disambiguation) =

The Merkabah (Hebrew: מרכבה) is a divine chariot seen by Ezekiel and Isaiah in the Hebrew Bible.

Merkabah or Merkavah may also refer to:

- The Merkava, a series of Israeli main battle tanks
- "Merkaba", a song by Tool from their 2000 box set Salival
- The stellated octahedron, a polyhedral compound and stellation named "merkaba" by some contemporary mystics

== See also ==
- Markaba (Arabic: مركبا), a village at Marjayoun, Nabatieh Governorate, Lebanon
- Merkavim (Hebrew: מרכבים), an Israeli bus manufacturer
