= YTV =

YTV or ytv may refer to:

- YTV (Canadian TV channel), a Canadian youth television station owned by Corus Entertainment
- YTV (Burmese TV network), a Burmese television channel owned by MY Multimedia Co., Ltd
- YTV (Botswanan TV channel), a Botswanan television channel
- YTV (Israeli TV channel), a defunct Israeli television channel
- Helsinki Metropolitan Area Council, a co-operation agency operating in the Helsinki Metropolitan Area
- Yale TV, the broadcast desk of the student newspaper Yale Daily News
- Yomiuri Telecasting Corporation, a TV station joining Nippon News Network and Nippon Television Network System in Osaka, Japan
- Yorkshire Television, former name of ITV Yorkshire, United Kingdom
- Yumurcak TV, a Turkish channel

== See also ==
- KYTV (TV station), an NBC affiliated television station in Springfield, Missouri
- WYTV, an ABC affiliated television station in Youngstown, Ohio
- WHYY-TV, a PBS member station in Philadelphia, Pennsylvania
