= List of Monsuno episodes =

This is a list of episodes for the animated television series Monsuno. The first two episodes ("Clash" and "Courage") aired as a one-hour special on Nicktoons in the United States.

== Series overview ==
Season	Episodes	Originally released (U.S. (Note: TV Tokyo in Japan aired the second season before the United States. All series overview dates reflect its American release.))	
Season	Episodes	First released	Last released
1	26	February 23, 2012	November 21, 2012
2	26	April 21, 2013	May 25, 2014
3	13	July 1, 2014	

== Episodes ==
=== Season 1: World Master (2012) ===
No. overall	No. in season	English title (Japanese title) (Note: If there is no Japanese title, it is a direct translation with the English title.)	Directed by	Written by	Animation directed by	American air date	Japanese air date
1	1	"Clash" ("Lock! (Key)"); Transliteration: "Rokku! (Kagi)" (Japanese: ロック!（鍵）)	Directed by : Taiji Kawanishi; Storyboarded by : Yoshiaki Okumura	Michael Ryan	Tomoko Iwasa	February 23, 2012	October 3, 2012
Chase Suno and his two best friends, Bren and Jinja, learn that Jeredy Suno (Chase's father and a scientist who worked for S.T.O.R.M.) is missing. Jon Ace and S.T.O.R.M. (Strategic Tactical Operatives for Recovery of Monsuno) join Chase at the lab, but it is soon revealed that they are after the fully-loaded core that Jeredy left behind for his son. Chase learns how to use his Monsuno, which he names Lock.
2	2	"Courage"; Transliteration: "Yūki" (Japanese: 勇気)	Directed by : Kazuhisa Ōno; Storyboarded by : Yoshiaki Okumura	Benjamin Townsend	Hideaki Isa	February 23, 2012	October 10, 2012
Chase discovers that his father had created a Monsuno called Quickforce, who is being held captive, experimented on by S.T.O.R.M. and is unpredictable. (Quickforce may reject someone's control and possibly kill him / her.) Chase leads a brave infiltration of the S.T.O.R.M. facility in order to save Quickforce. Chase leads the guards away and fights Ace while Bren and Jinja find Quickforce. After playing rock, paper, scissors to see who gets to be Quickforce's Master, Bren rescues Quickforce and is now his "Master" like Chase is with his Monsuno, Lock. Together, they take care of Trey's Monsuno, Riccoshot.
3	3	"Underground" ("Underworld"); Transliteration: "Chika Sekai" (Japanese: 地下世界)	Directed by : Yōsuke Hashiguchi; Storyboarded by : Yoshiaki Okumura & Hideki Hosokawa	Caroline Farah	Tomoaki Kado	March 1, 2012	October 17, 2012
The trio heads to Axistown where they meet a mysterious woman who sends them to an underground fight club; Jinja obtains her own Monsuno she calls Charger.
4	4	"Wicked" ("Trap"); Transliteration: "Torappu" (Japanese: 罠(トラップ))	Directed by : Ken Ando; Storyboarded by : Iku Suzuki & Yoshiaki Okumura	Rob David	Kenji Matsuoka	March 8, 2012	October 24, 2012
Medea, The Commander of the mercenaries Dark Spin lures Chase to an abandoned facility for a duel of Monsunos.
5	5	"Knowledge" ("Mysterious Boy"); Transliteration: "Fushigina Shōnen" (Japanese: ふしぎな少年)	Directed by : Takuo Suzuki; Storyboarded by : Tomonori Kogawa	Mark Hoffmeier	Tomonori Kogawa	March 15, 2012	October 31, 2012
After being captured by the evil Bookman, Chase, Bren, and Jinja must team up with a monk named Beyal in order to escape.
6	6	"Breakthrough"; Transliteration: "Toppa" (Japanese: 突破)	Housei Suzuki	Rob David	Kōji Kōno & Minoru Tanaka	March 22, 2012	November 7, 2012
S.T.O.R.M. sets up a blockade to keep anyone from leaving Mandala; Chase becomes convinced that he and his friends must attack S.T.O.R.M..
7	7	"R.S.V.P." ("Ash Appears"); Transliteration: "Asshu Tōjō" (Japanese: アッシュ登場)	Mitsuru Nasukawa	Benjamin Townsend	Mitsuru Nasukawa & Yuko Iwaoka	March 29, 2012	November 14, 2012
The Core-Tech team Monsuno duel with Dax; Dr. Klipse joins forces with Chase to find Jeredy's whereabouts.
8	8	"Appleseeds" ("Reunion with Father"); Transliteration: "Chichi to no Saikai" (Japanese: 父との再会)	Directed by : Noriyuki Nomata; Storyboarded by : Susumu Nishizawa	Caroline Farah	Mitsuru Sōma	May 29, 2012	November 21, 2012
While following Dax, the Core-Tech team happens to catch sight of Jeredy Suno when they're suddenly attacked by Dark Spin mercenaries. Before being separated once more, Jeredy gives his son a new Monsuno named Evo.
9	9	"Eye" ("Wild Core"); Transliteration: "Wairudo Koa" (Japanese: ワイルドコア)	Directed by : Taiji Kawanishi; Storyboarded by : Masaki Watanabe	Jeremy Adams	Ichirō Ogawa	May 30, 2012	November 28, 2012
While fishing, a fisherman awakens a dormant wild core off the shore of Coastal City. Gaining information from Dax, Chase and the rest of the Core-Tech team make their way to Coastal City in search of Jeredy Suno. When they arrive the city is in the midst of a hurricane and they are moved to an underground storm shelter, while in the shelter the same fisherman recognizes the core on Chase's hip and tells them about the wild core, how he survived the sinking of his ship, and how he spotted a S.T.O.R.M. airship before swimming to shore. Chase then decides to go and stop S.T.O.R.M. from getting their hands on the core and destroying the city in the process.
10	10	"Deceit" ("STORM")	Directed by : Tomohito Naka; Storyboarded by : Naruse Takahashi & Yoshiaki Okumura	Mark Hoffmeier	Senzō Shima, Takashi Tsuda & Iku Kataoka	May 31, 2012	December 5, 2012
Dax betrays The Core-Tech team to Charlemagne for Monsuno Essence, but it turns out to be a combined strategy of both him and Chase.
11	11	"Trust"; Transliteration: "Shinrai" (Japanese: 信頼)	Directed by : Yōsuke Hashiguchi; Storyboarded by : Hiroshi Fukutomi	Caroline Farah	Kouji Yamagata & Keiya Nakano	June 7, 2012	December 12, 2012
Under constant robot drone attack, Jon Ace warns Chase that he has a spy in his midst and invites him to join S.T.O.R.M., which he accepts. Without him the rest of the Core-Tech team start arguing which results in a 2-on-2 battle amongst themselves. While on his way to S.T.O.R.M., Chase changes his mind and wants to go back to his team, but they first have to escape the S.T.O.R.M. attack planes. Meanwhile, Dark Spin attacks the rest of the Core-Tech team.
12	12	"Hunted" ("Monsuno Hunter"); Transliteration: "Monsūno Hantā" (Japanese: モンスーノハンター)	Directed by : Housei Suzuki; Storyboarded by : Housei Suzuki & Kazuo Terada	Benjamin Townsend	Tomoaki Kado, Kōji Kōno, Michiru Ogiwara, Masayuki Nomoto & Katsusuke Konuma	June 14, 2012	December 19, 2012
While stumbling onto what appears to be an ancient Monsuno temple in the jungle with Jon Ace, the Core-Tech team are attacked, captured, and their cores stolen by the crazy Dom Pyro, an agent of the Eklipse Organization.
13	13	"Shadow"; Transliteration: "Kage" (Japanese: 影)	Directed by : Ken Ando; Storyboarded by : Minoru Ōhara	Marty Isenberg	Kenji Matsuoka	June 21, 2012	December 26, 2012
Jon Ace takes the Core-Tech team to what used to be a Monsuno Essence mine run by Jeredy Suno, but is now an Eklipse Organization research faculty. While the Core-Tech team seeks information from Jeredy, Jon Ace seeks to destroy the Monsuno Essence because he believes is too dangerous.
14	14	"Lost"; Transliteration: "Mayoeru-mono" (Japanese: 迷える者)	Directed by : Noriyuki Nomata & Naoyoshi Kusaka; Storyboarded by : Kazuo Terada & Yoshiaki Okumura	Benjamin Townsend	Ichirō Ogawa, Masayuki Nomoto & Yoshimi Katsumata	June 28, 2012	December 26, 2012
Chase, Bren, Jinja, and Beyal have a vision of the future in which Lock goes rogue and causes widespread destruction. While contemplating this vision Chase is attacked by a S.T.O.R.M. soldier. Chase battles the soldier and defeats his Monsuno Airchopper when Lock runs away. In the desert, Lock happens upon a Monsuno wild core buried in the ground and absorbs its Essence. In this confused state, a former S.T.O.R.M. agent named Jack uses Lock for his own purposes. When Chase and the others finally find Jack and Lock they battle and Jack almosts wins with his Monsuno Freedom Striker.
15	15	"Light"; Transliteration: "Hikari" (Japanese: 光)	Directed by : Takuo Suzuki; Storyboarded by : Tomonori Kogawa	Jeremy Adams	Tomonori Kogawa	July 5, 2012	January 9, 2013
Chase heads to a special library to obtain an ancient book to fix his bond with Lock. When they get there and get the book, the Dawnmaster steals it. Then Chase and the others chase after him and Chase eventually gets the book as he is captured. The Bookman tries to make Lock his Monsuno, but it doesn't work. The Dawnmaster battles the Bookman's Monsuno Cheeclaw.
16	16	"Bright" ("Amusement Park"); Transliteration: "Yuenchi" (Japanese: 遊園地)	Directed by : Kōta Okuno; Storyboarded by : Mitsuru Nasukawa	Caroline Farah	Yuko Iwaoka	July 12, 2012	January 16, 2013
The gang go on vacation in Westward City, but get attacked by One-Eyed Jack and get help from a stranger who knew Jeredy Suno.
17	17	"Trophies" ("Revenge"); Transliteration: "Ribenji" (Japanese: リベンジ)	Directed by : Taiji Kawanishi; Storyboarded by : Hiroshi Hara & Yoshiaki Okumura	Matthew Drdek	Katsusuke Konuma, Tomoaki Kado & Masaru Kanemori	July 19, 2012	January 23, 2013
Chase's visions are getting more intense, while Beyal's are disappearing. Dom Pyro returns to make the team into trophies.
18	18	"Ice" ("To the North"); Transliteration: "Kita e" (Japanese: 北へ)	Directed by : Housei Suzuki; Storyboarded by : Housei Suzuki & Kazuo Terada	Mark Banker	Ichirō Ogawa, Michiru Ogiwara, Momoka Komatsu & Masayuki Nomoto	July 26, 2012	January 30, 2013
Chase and his friends discover that Beyal lost his soul, and they head to the library to figure out how to get Beyal his soul back, but Dark Spin interferes.
19	19	"Wellspring" ("Fountain"); Transliteration: "Izumi" (Japanese: 泉)	Directed by : Tomohito Naka & Hiromichi Matano; Storyboarded by : Minoru Ōhara	Benjamin Townsend & Michael Ryan	Iku Kataoka, Yuichi Hirano & Futoshi Higashide	October 12, 2012	February 6, 2013
Chase and the rest of the Core-Tech team have discovered The Valley of the Five Tribes, but so have S.T.O.R.M. and the Eklipse Organization.
20	20	"Life"; Transliteration: "Inochi" (Japanese: 生命(いのち))	Directed by : Naoyoshi Kusaka & Yōsuke Hashiguchi; Storyboarded by : Katsuhito Watanabe & Kazuo Terada	Caroline Farah	Masayuki Nomoto, Hiroto Katō & Kōji Kōno	October 19, 2012	February 13, 2013
Stemming from one of Beyal's visions, Chase discovers his mother, Sophia is still alive. Seeking answers from his father, Chase forces Dax to take him to Jeredy's location. During the Sunos' talk, S.T.O.R.M. attacks and captures Jeredy.
21	21	"Failsafe" ("Ash's Secret"); Transliteration: "Asshu no Himitsu" (Japanese: アッシュのひみつ)	Directed by : Masato Miyoshi & Keiji Kawakubo; Storyboarded by : Hiroyuki Shimazu	Caroline Farah	Katsusuke Konuma, Miyuki Honda & Kenji Matsuoka	October 26, 2012	February 20, 2013
Dax tells the rest of the Core-Tech team what he knows about Jeredy, which leads to Bren discovering Jeredy's plan. During an attack by Jack on the Core-Tech team, he reveals the full scope of his mission to the Core-Tech team and later the rest of the world.
22	22	"Remembrance" ("Father and Son..."); Transliteration: "Chantoko to..." (Japanese: 父と子と...)	Directed by : Hiromichi Matano & Kazuma Satō; Storyboarded by : Tomonori Kogawa	Matthew Drdek	Tomonori Kogawa	November 2, 2012	February 27, 2013
The Core-Tech team gets a message that Dark Spin is chasing Jeredy, and the Core-Tech team goes to help. Afterwards, Chase learns that Sophia has already been captured: this happened over eleven years ago. Unfortunately, S.T.O.R.M. once again captures Jeredy.
23	23	"Assault" ("Giant Battleship"); Transliteration: "Kyodai Senkan" (Japanese: 巨大戦艦)	Directed by : Noriyuki Nomata & Naoyoshi Kusaka; Storyboarded by : Minoru Ōhara	Mark Banker	Ichirō Ogawa, Masayuki Nomoto & Shinichiro Minami	November 9, 2012	March 6, 2013
Following Chase's plan, the Core-Tech team seeks to free Jeredy from the clutches of S.T.O.R.M..
24	24	"Monster"; Transliteration: "Monsutā" (Japanese: モンスター)	Directed by : Yōsuke Hashiguchi & Kōta Okuno; Storyboarded by : Yoshiaki Okumura	Matthew Drdek	Kōji Kōno, Katsusuke Konuma, Hiroto Katō & Toyoaki Fukushima	November 16, 2012	March 13, 2013
After Jeredy and the Core-Tech team place the last failsafe device, they are attacked by the Eklipse Organization. They discover that Jeredy and Chase's friend Jon Ace had survived the explosion, but were reborn as Monsunos by Eklipse, and Jeredy is captured.
25	25	"Endgame" ("The Battle with Eklipse"); Transliteration: "Kuripusu to no Tatakai" (Japanese: クリプスとの闘い)	Directed by : Housei Suzuki; Storyboarded by : Kazuo Terada & Tetsuji Nakamura	Caroline Farah	Yoshimi Agata & Yūji Moriyama	November 21, 2012	March 20, 2013
Using Jack as a diversion and with the help of the Dawnmaster, Chase plans to break into Eklipse Organization headquarters and free his father once and for all.
26	26	"Rising" ("Towards Tomorrow"); Transliteration: "Ashita e" (Japanese: 明日(あした)へ)	Directed by : Taiji Kawanishi & Hiromichi Matano; Storyboarded by : Yoshiaki Okumura & Taiji Kawanishi	Caroline Farah	Kenji Matsuoka, Tomonori Kogawa, (Note: Credited as Hiromichi Ochinanokuni); Futoshi Higashide & Momoka Komatsu	November 21, 2012	March 27, 2013
An all-out battle takes place between the Eklipse Organization, Core-Tech, and S.T.O.R.M. The battle ends with Core-Tech's victory and Lock is fused with another of Chase's Monsunos by Eklipse's base exploding. Afterwards, Jeredy gives Chase the trigger switch to decide the fate of the Monsuno. However, believing there could be a way for Monsunos and humans to live in peace, Chase throws the trigger switch away.

=== Season 2: Combat Chaos (2013) ===
The second season, titled Monsuno: Combat Chaos, debuted in the United States on Nicktoons, with a worldwide release having been planned across Nickelodeon outlets in 2013. The Japanese Animation News Website, Anime! Anime! Biz, later reported that the United States would broadcast the second season in the second half of 2013. However, Nicktoons and Monsuno's Facebook would eventually announce that the second season would begin airing on April 21, 2013.

In Japan, the second season, still under the Japanese title Jūsen Batoru Monsūno, began broadcasting on April 3, 2013, on TV Tokyo, with a new opening and ending theme song performed by Rey. Rey previously did the first season opening theme song in the Japanese release of the series.

No. overall	No. in season	English title (Japanese title)	Directed by	Written by	Animation directed by	Japanese air date	American air date
27	1	"Flash" ("Machinery Drenched in Orange"); Transliteration: "Kikai Darake no Orenji" (Japanese: 機械だらけのオレンジ)	Directed by : Taiji Kawanishi; Storyboarded by : Yoshiaki Okumura	Caroline Farah & Michael Ryan	Yūji Moriyama	April 3, 2013	April 21, 2013
Team Core-Tech comes face-to-face with members of the Forge Resistance, Drezz and the Punk Monks. These baddies are working for their evil boss, Professor Tallis, in obtaining a very destructive Wild Core Bomb. This thing has enough power to level an entire city. Drezz and his team set one off and Team Core-Tech barely makes it out alive. Unfortunately, Bren's Monsuno, Quickforce, isn't so lucky.
28	2	"Bang" ("Lock Rush"); Transliteration: "Rokku Totsunyū" (Japanese: ロック突入)	Directed by : Yōsuke Hashiguchi; Storyboarded by : Minoru Ōhara	Michael Ryan	Kōji Kōno & Futoshi Higashide	April 10, 2013	April 28, 2013
Team Core-Tech must stop Professor Tallis and his Forge Resistance from completing their ultimate plan, to put a Mega Wild Core Bomb on a rocket and fly it into Westward City. After intense fighting, Bren launches Neo-Quickforce and saves the day on the ground while Chase puts himself in the rocket in order to place the bomb harmlessly into space, only to return to earth in the arms of Lock. The protective shield barely holds as they burn back down and crash-land near the city they just saved.
29	3	"Mysterious" ("Mutant Forest"); Transliteration: "Myūtanto no Mori" (Japanese: ミュータントの森)	Directed by : Kazuma Satō; Storyboarded by : Kazuo Terada	Thomas Krajewski	Katsusuke Konuma & Masayuki Nomoto	April 17, 2013	May 5, 2013
Medea and her team are following Team Core-Tech as Medea has a new, secret Benefactor. They are having Chase followed so that Chase can be tested! Team Core-Tech is out looking for meteor fragments and data on Monsuno Essence for Dr. Jeredy Suno's important, world-saving work. An epic battle ensues which only gets more epic as the secret Benefactor shows up with a Core all his own and creates a Clone Lock!
30	4	"Antithesis" ("Strike Force"); Transliteration: "Sutoraiku Fōsu" (Japanese: ストライクフォース)	Directed by : Keiji Kawakubo; Storyboarded by : Osamu Tadokoro	Benjamin Townsend	Kenji Matsuoka	April 24, 2013	May 12, 2013
On the trail of a big cache of S.T.O.R.M.-controlled Monsunos, Team Core-Tech walks into a trap set by a new group of Monsuno Controllers, S.T.O.R.M.'s Strike Squad! These juvenile delinquents have been picked by Charlemagne and Commander Trey to destroy Team Core-Tech.
31	5	"Kidnapped" ("Fate"); Transliteration: "In'nen" (Japanese: 因縁)	Directed by : Hiromichi Matano; Storyboarded by : Tetsuji Nakamura	Ernie Altbacker	See note for the ADs (Note: Satomi Higuchi, Tomohito Hirose, Yūji Moriyama, Futoshi Higashide, Momoka Komatsu, Michiru Ogiwara & Asami Kishikawa)	May 1, 2013	May 19, 2013
Dax goes to his hometown and waits for a mysterious person to tell him information about his parents, only to find out it's Dom Pyro, who tricked him so Dr. Eklipse can experiment on him to re-create what happened to Jon Ace, so the rest of Team Core-Tech must find and save him before he mutates into "Toxic Dax".
32	6	"6"	Directed by : Naoyoshi Kusaka; Storyboarded by : Minoru Ōhara	Benjamin Townsend	Masayuki Nomoto	May 8, 2013	May 26, 2013
Dr. Klipse reveals his latest experiment, Number 6, a teenage clone of himself, and sends him out to destroy Team Core-Tech. While out hunting Punk Monks, Team Core-Tech discovers Six and invites him along. Meanwhile, Chase has visions of his mother in some kind of warning. While battling the Punk Monks, Six is forced to choose between his father or his new friends. He picks his father, and Chase has to use a double Monsuno attack to win. The others are mad, but Chase understands Six was only trying to help his "father" and lets Six walk this time.
33	7	"Mirrors" ("Race Against Time"); Transliteration: "Shiren no Toki" (Japanese: 試練の時)	Directed by : Taiji Kawanishi; Storyboarded by : Yoshiaki Okumura	Thomas Krajewski	Aki Yamauchi & Kōji Kōno	May 15, 2013	June 2, 2013
Team Core-Tech awakens in a strange apocalyptic land where Monsuno Essence has taken over and destabilized the world! To save his friends and the whole world, Beyal must face the prospect of having to destroy all Monsunos. Later, it turns out to be a simulator to see if Team Core-Tech had what it took if it became real.
34	8	"Lynchpin"; Transliteration: "Rinchipin" (Japanese: リンチピン)	Directed by : Yōsuke Hashiguchi; Storyboarded by : Kazuo Terada	Ernie Altbacker	Katsusuke Konuma & Yūji Moriyama	May 22, 2013	June 9, 2013
After Jeredy Suno reveals the mystery of Lock as the lynchpin bridging humanity and all Monsunos, Dr. Klipse and his cloned son Six work with Don Pyro to try and steal him and destroy Chase.
35	9	"Insight" ("Clone Shifter"); Transliteration: "Kurōn Shifutā" (Japanese: クローンシフター)	Directed by : Hiromichi Matano; Storyboarded by : Minoru Ōhara	Thomas Krajewski	Yūji Moriyama, Asami Kishikawa, Yoshinori Tokiya & Pil Kang Kim	May 29, 2013	June 16, 2013
While on a Core-Tech and Forge battle, Chase is transported to The Hand of Destiny so they can steal his energy. Unexpectedly, Beyal is similarly transported to Chase's side and the two are made to pit their wits against the new villains.
36	10	"Tornado"; Transliteration: "Tatsumaki" (Japanese: 竜巻)	Directed by : Keiji Kawakubo; Storyboarded by : Tetsuji Nakamura	Benjamin Townsend	Kenji Matsuoka	June 5, 2013	June 23, 2013
Team Core-Tech discovers that S.T.O.R.M. has been stacking up dangerous amounts of Monsuno Essence, and One-Eyed Jack and the Desert Wolves plan to blow it up and create a tornado that could wipe out nearly half of the earth! After discovering the plan, Team Core-Tech tries to stop it.
37	11	"Knights" ("Tavkagar Knights"); Transliteration: "Tavukagā no Kishi" (Japanese: タヴカガーの騎士)	Kazuma Satō	Benjamin Townsend	Katsusuke Konuma, Asami Kishikawa & Naoki Murakami	June 12, 2013	June 30, 2013
S.T.O.R.M. specialist Alpha of Strike Squad wishes to prove that he is a superior Monsuno controller to Chase, and challenges him by invoking the rite of Tav Kagah.
38	12	"Protect" ("What Is Your Name?"); Transliteration: "Kimi no Namae wa?" (Japanese: キミの名は?)	Directed by : Naoyoshi Kusaka; Storyboarded by : Dojag-a-gen	Jennifer Muro	Masayuki Nomoto	June 19, 2013	January 26, 2014
The Hand of Destiny wants a new Keeper to replenish their energy servants at the Well of Sight. A young girl with the Monsuno Sight is their target. It's up to Team Core-Tech to protect her from the Hand of Destiny's malevolent grasp.
39	13	"Power" ("Junkyard"); Transliteration: "Jankuyādo" (Japanese: ジャンクヤード)	Directed by : Taiji Kawanishi; Storyboarded by : Minoru Ōhara	Thomas Krajewski	Kōji Kōno & Yūji Moriyama	June 26, 2013	February 23, 2014
Team Core-Tech follows the Punk Monks to Professor Tallis' secret base and uncovers a Monsuno Frequency experiment that goes very wrong, leaving Chase and the team to figure out a new way of fighting to win the day.
40	14	"Extras" ("Strike Gear"); Transliteration: "Sutoraiku Gia" (Japanese: ストライクギア)	Directed by : Yōsuke Hashiguchi; Storyboarded by : Minoru Ōhara	Thomas Krajewski	Ichirō Ogawa & Pil Kang Kim	July 3, 2013	March 2, 2014
Team Core-Tech loses with the help of Eklipse Battle Boosts. Klipse uses his new tech to lure S.T.O.R.M. and Professor Tallis to Coastal City where he plans to unleash a mutation gas. Team Core-Tech must stop him with their own boosts, Strike Gear.
41	15	"Peace" ("Bekka's Lullaby"); Transliteration: "Bekka no Komori-uta" (Japanese: ベッカの子守唄)	Directed by : Yasuro Tsuchiya; Storyboarded by : Kazuo Terada	Benjamin Townsend	Yukari Miyagawa, Yoshiko Nakajima, Kazuyuki Ikai & Katsusuke Konuma	July 10, 2013	March 9, 2014
Beyal has a vision of Master Ey in trouble. Team Core-Tech races to his aid only to find One-Eyed Jack and the Desert Wolves seeking to find asylum from S.T.O.R.M.. Bekka reveals a past that links her to Beyal's. Jack, under Charlemagne's mind control, kills Master Ey, causing Beyal to become enraged. Bekka calms him down.
42	16	"Train" ("Tracking"); Transliteration: "Tsuiseki" (Japanese: 追跡)	Directed by : Kazuma Satō; Storyboarded by : Dojag-a-gen	Thomas Krajewski	Yūji Moriyama & Yūji Yanase	July 17, 2013	March 16, 2014
Charlemagne figures out that Jeredy is traveling on the train lines and sends in the Strike Squad to capture him. Dr. Suno calls in Chase and Team Core-Tech to stop Strike Squad before it's too late, and at the end the train transforms into a submarine, annoying Commandant Charlemagne so much that she breaks her tiny whip.
43	17	"Combat" ("Battle Arena"); Transliteration: "Batoru Arīna" (Japanese: バトルアリーナ)	Directed by : Keiji Kawakubo; Storyboarded by : Osamu Tadokoro	Jeremy Adams	Kenji Matsuoka	July 24, 2013	March 23, 2014
Dr. Suno has a virtual reality trainer to help the kids perfect their combat expertise. When Droog causes the kids to be stuck in the virtual world, The only way out is to win or be trapped forever.
44	18	"Frenemies" ("Frog Prince"); Transliteration: "Kaeru no Ōji" (Japanese: カエルの王子)	Hiromichi Matano	Benjamin Townsend	Masayuki Nomoto	July 31, 2013	March 30, 2014
Monsuno Sight makes Chase and Beyal vulnerable to the Hand of Destiny. The Hand of Destiny infiltrates their dreams, making them fight their friends and ripe for a capture until the rest of Team Core-Tech devises a way to wake their friends up. It is at this stage that Team Core-Tech realises that the Hand of Destiny were the ones who kidnapped Chase's mother.
45	19	"Pulse"; Transliteration: "Parusu!" (Japanese: パルス!)	Directed by : Taiji Kawanishi; Storyboarded by : Minoru Ōhara	Thomas Krajewski	Kōji Kōno & Yūji Moriyama	August 7, 2013	April 6, 2014
Jeredy needs Team Core-Tech to break into S.T.O.R.M.'s underground base and collect harmonic samples of the original cores. But Team Core-Tech finds out this base is the seat of its new ARMADA and they would have to be lucky to get in and out alive.
46	20	"Hate" ("Droog"); Transliteration: "Dorūgu" (Japanese: ドルーグ)	Directed by : Yōsuke Hashiguchi; Storyboarded by : Tetsuji Nakamura	Michael Ryan	Ichirō Ogawa & Katsusuke Konuma	August 14, 2013	April 13, 2014
Droog executes his plan to use the failsafe device to destroy the Monsuno Essence and avenge the people of his destroyed planet. Team Core-Tech forms a temporary truce with Klipse and Hargrave in an effort to stop him.
47	21	"Discovery" ("Treasure of the Five Tribes"); Transliteration: "Go Buzoku no Hihō" (Japanese: 五部族の秘宝)	Directed by : Yasuro Tsuchiya; Storyboarded by : Kazuo Terada	Benjamin Townsend	Toshiya Furuike, Kazuyuki Ikai & Hidetaka Kaneko	August 21, 2013	April 20, 2014
Bren has a vision of Sophia while attempting to help Chase with his meditations. She directs the team to assemble an artifact known as the Pentoculus, which would guide them to her. However, a scene reveals this to be a ploy by the Hand of Destiny as they seek to shed their mortality!
48	22	"Thunderhead" ("Cumulonimbus Cloud"); Transliteration: "Sekiran'un" (Japanese: 積乱雲)	Directed by : Kazuma Satō; Storyboarded by : Minoru Ōhara	Thomas Krajewski	Yūji Moriyama & Kiyotoshi Aoi	August 28, 2013	April 27, 2014
What will Charlemagne do when she is backed into a corner? This is a question that Team Core-Tech would discover the answer to while they raid the S.T.O.R.M. archives in search of the Pentoculus pieces, but only find one.
49	23	"Mayhem" ("Tallis' Love"); Transliteration: "Tarisu no Koi" (Japanese: タリスの恋)	Directed by : Keiji Kawakubo; Storyboarded by : Osamu Tadokoro	Jeremy Adams	Kenji Matsuoka	September 4, 2013	May 4, 2014
Team Core-Tech manages to trick Professor Tallis with a hologram of Charlemagne. Tallis has fallen in love with her and decides to help her come through from S.T.O.R.M. Meanwhile the whole Earth is suffering from earthquakes and Jeredy Suno is trying to stop them. Also, Professor Tallis has the third piece of the Pentoculus. So Team Core-Tech's missions are two: To stop the earthquakes and steal the piece of the Pentoculus.
50	24	"Pentoculus"; Transliteration: "Pentokyurasu" (Japanese: ペントキュラス)	Directed by : Naoyoshi Kusaka; Storyboarded by : Dojag-a-gen	Benjamin Townsend	Masayuki Nomoto	September 11, 2013	May 11, 2014
Chase and friends seek the final piece of the Pentoculus. There are two problems: one, Klipse has it. Two, he is once again trying to create a human-Monsuno hybrid.
51	25	"Massive" ("The Revolver"); Transliteration: "Za Riborubā" (Japanese: ザ・リボルバー)	Directed by : Hiromichi Matano; Storyboarded by : Minoru Ōhara	Michael Ryan	Katsusuke Konuma & Ichirō Ogawa	September 18, 2013	May 18, 2014
Following the completed Pentoculus, Team Core-Tech travels to the Canyon of the Shooting Star. However, once they arrive the Hand of Destiny summons Charlemagne, Klipse, Drezz and Tinker.
52	26	"Victory" ("After the Battle"); Transliteration: "Kessen no Ato de" (Japanese: 決戦のあとで)	Directed by : Yōsuke Hashiguchi; Storyboarded by : Yoshiaki Okumura	Michael Ryan	Yūji Moriyama & Kōji Kōno	September 25, 2013	May 25, 2014
Team Core-Tech battles the Hand of Destiny one last time. However, the Well of Sight makes the HOD's shapeshifting Monsunos exceedingly powerful, and they have Sophia as a trump card. They then steal the Pentoculus from Chase and then use it to steal the life force from every person who possesses the Monsuno Sight, including Hargrave, Chef Syd, and Alpha, X-Ray and Tango of S.T.O.R.M. Strike Squad. If they are to prevail, Team Core-Tech must be willing to make the ultimate sacrifice.

=== Season 3: Combat Chaos (2014) ===
In Greece, the first episode of the third season aired on September 5, 2014, making it the first country to air the third season on television. In Japan, the season was never aired or dubbed into Japanese.

On July 1, 2014, the 13-episode third season was initially distributed in the United States as a Hulu exclusive, retaining the "Combat Chaos" subtitle of the second season.

No. overall	No. in season	Title	Directed by	Written by	Animation produced by	American air date
53	1	"Evolve"	Yoshiaki Okumura	Michael Ryan	Yuji Miyazaki	July 1, 2014
54	2	"Evolve"	Yoshiaki Okumura	Michael Ryan	Yuji Miyazaki	July 1, 2014
Part 1: Chase and Team Core-Tech discover that Dr. Klipse has teamed up with Professor Tallis to create dangerous Dino-Monsunos. But it quickly goes from bad to worse when they see Droog's new creations. Part 2: An intense 3-way face-off against Dr. Klipse / Tallis and Droog / Hand of Destiny, sees our heroes way over their heads – until the Core-Tech Monsunos evolve. Team Core-Tech gets the powerful advantage they need to survive.
55	3	"POV"	Yoshiaki Okumura	Jeremy Adams	Yuji Miyazaki	July 1, 2014
TCT is captured in the icy wastelands of North Point while uncovering a Dino DNA dig site that belongs to Dr. Klipse. With Lock's help, our heroes break free and use their newly-evolving Monsunos to shut things down.
56	4	"Temple"	Yoshiaki Okumura	Caroline Farah	Yuji Miyazaki	July 1, 2014
Chase's Mom, Sophia is finally back home – but not for long. On a mission to re-establish the Library of Tebab, she and Beyal are hijacked by the Bookman. They escape only to fall into the hands of Droog. Can Chase save them?
57	5	"Haunting"	Yoshiaki Okumura	Thomas Krajewski	Yuji Miyazaki	July 1, 2014
Jinja spends her birthday in an intense virtual reality adventure that has been secretly arranged by her friends.
58	6	"Spin"	Yoshiaki Okumura	Caroline Farah	Yuji Miyazaki	July 1, 2014
In this mid season 3-parter, Dax enters an underground Monsuno Fight Club tournament. What he doesn't know is that winning the tournament would land him directly in the dangerous hands of the main villain, Dr. Klipse.
59	7	"Go"	Yoshiaki Okumura	Caroline Farah	Yuji Miyazaki	July 1, 2014
A huge cast of Monsuno characters (Grandma Future, Mr. Black, Jon Ace, Strike Squad, Punk Monks, and more!) arrives in the fast-action conclusion to this mid season 2-parter.
60	8	"Test"	Yoshiaki Okumura	Benjamin Townsend	Yuji Miyazaki	July 1, 2014
Chase and Team Core-Tech attempt to intercept an unauthorized sale of Monsuno Essence, but end up uncovering a more dangerous plot, crafted by Droog. Can they fight their way past Droog's youthful new Hand of Destiny?
61	9	"Pet"	Yoshiaki Okumura	Kevin Burke & Chris Wyatt	Yuji Miyazaki	July 1, 2014
After Strike Squad disappears in a giant factory in Mechanopolis, Team Core-Tech is sent on a rescue mission. What Chase & friends discover within the cavernous interior of the factory, would put them all to the ultimate test.
62	10	"Babysitting"	Yoshiaki Okumura	Jeremy Adams	Yuji Miyazaki	July 1, 2014
Commander Trey's nephew, Sebastian, is kidnapped by Petros and the Hand of Destiny, along with an important stash of Jeredy's access codes. It's up to Team Core-Tech to rescue Sebastian and safeguard the stolen data – STAT!
63	11	"Space"	Yoshiaki Okumura	Thomas Krajewski	Yuji Miyazaki	July 1, 2014
Team Core-Tech is sent into outer space to investigate an attack on the S.T.O.R.M. space station. They must fight off powerful & creepy alien Monsunos in order to get the station back in orbit.
64	12	"Bros"	Yoshiaki Okumura	Benjamin Townsend	Yuji Miyazaki	July 1, 2014
Team Core-Tech joins Bren as he travels home to visit his quirky family. When a threat rises up in the mines below, Bren steps up to save the day, convincing his brothers he's braver than they ever thought he could be.
65	13	"Ceasefire"	Yoshiaki Okumura	Michael Ryan	Yuji Miyazaki	July 1, 2014
Droog teleports Jeredy, Chase, Dr. Klipse and Six to a deserted island with an erupting volcano! Team Core-Tech arrives, freeing Chase in time for him and Lock to capture Dr. Klipse & Six and defeat Droog – for good.
