= YTV (Israeli TV channel) =

YTV was an Israeli television channel produced by Synergy for Yes. It started broadcasting in 2000, was later renamed Yes Y and subsequently shut down.

== History ==
The channel started on September 24, 2000, coinciding with the launch of the Yes satellite television platform, its main show was Y Tonight (Y baErev). The channel's website used Macromedia Flash technology. In addition to original content, it also aired foreign programming such as Da Ali G Show. In January 2001, it signed a cooperation agreement with FM100, in which its top 20 chart show was simulcast on the radio station and on Kol Regat in Amakim. To counter the introduction of Virgin Mobile, Cellcom partnered with the channel for promotional campaigns, as well as the usage of its network to deliver text messages.

The Cable and Satellite Broadcasting Council forbade Yes from marketing YTV as a kids and youth channel on July 31, 2003, on the grounds that it had sexual content seen as intense, bordering on flagrant. The key findings also found out that the channel aired programming with sexual content during daytime.

On August 1, 2004, Yes realigned its channels and rebranded YTV as Yes Y. Promotheus, the company in charge of Yes's graphics, did the rebrand and initiated a campaign to promote Project Y 2 on Channel 2 and Channel 10, as well as in movie theatres. The channel closed in 2006.
