= Superbus (company) =

Bus transport company in Israel

Superbus סופרבוס הסעים ותיור בע"מ
- Parent: Balilious Group
- Founded: 2000; 26 years ago
- Headquarters: 27 Harekhes Avenue, Modi'in
- Service area: Various
- Service type: bus service
- Website: www.superbus.co.il

Superbus (Hebrew: סופרבוס) is an Israeli bus company, which provides intercity and urban service in Afula, Tiberias, Yokneam and Jerusalem. The company is headquartered at Modi'in and equally owned by companies like the Limited and Auto Iris Travelers Yeruham Limited.

== History ==
Superbus was formed in 2000, to participate in auctions for the privatization of public transportation in Israel's whose goal was to lower prices and break the monopolies of the Egged Bus Cooperative, and the Dan Bus Company.

In 2001 the company was awarded a tender to operate the Ramla–Lod and Matityahu transportation clusters, replacing Egged on 6 May 2002.

In 2007 it was published that Superbus won a tender to operate public transportation in Bet Shemesh and the Jerusalem corridor in spite of its low quality of service, and the large number of complaints filed by passengers against the company.

A lawsuit was filed by Connex and by Illit, after which a final decision was taken in favor of Superbus. The company began operating these lines in January 2009.

In early 2009 the company began operating lines in Beit Shemesh and the Jerusalem corridor.

Since the summer of 2011 the company began to operate a night line.

In 2013, Superbus lost the Ramla–Lod–Matityahu tender to the rival Kavim bus company, and the Beit Shemesh tender in 2017.

In 2019 Superbus lost the Jerusalem corridor tender to Afikim, which will take over November 1.

In March 2014, Superbus won the tender for cluster the valleys which includes the cities: Afula, Migdal Haemek, Beit Shean, Yokneam Illit, Kiryat Tivon, Daliyat al-Karmel-Isfiya and Tiberias.

Superbus began first in the Yokneam area in December 2014, then in Afula in March 2015, and in Tiberias in July 2015.

Superbus began operating the Metronit in Haifa on October 15, 2021.

== Bus fleet ==
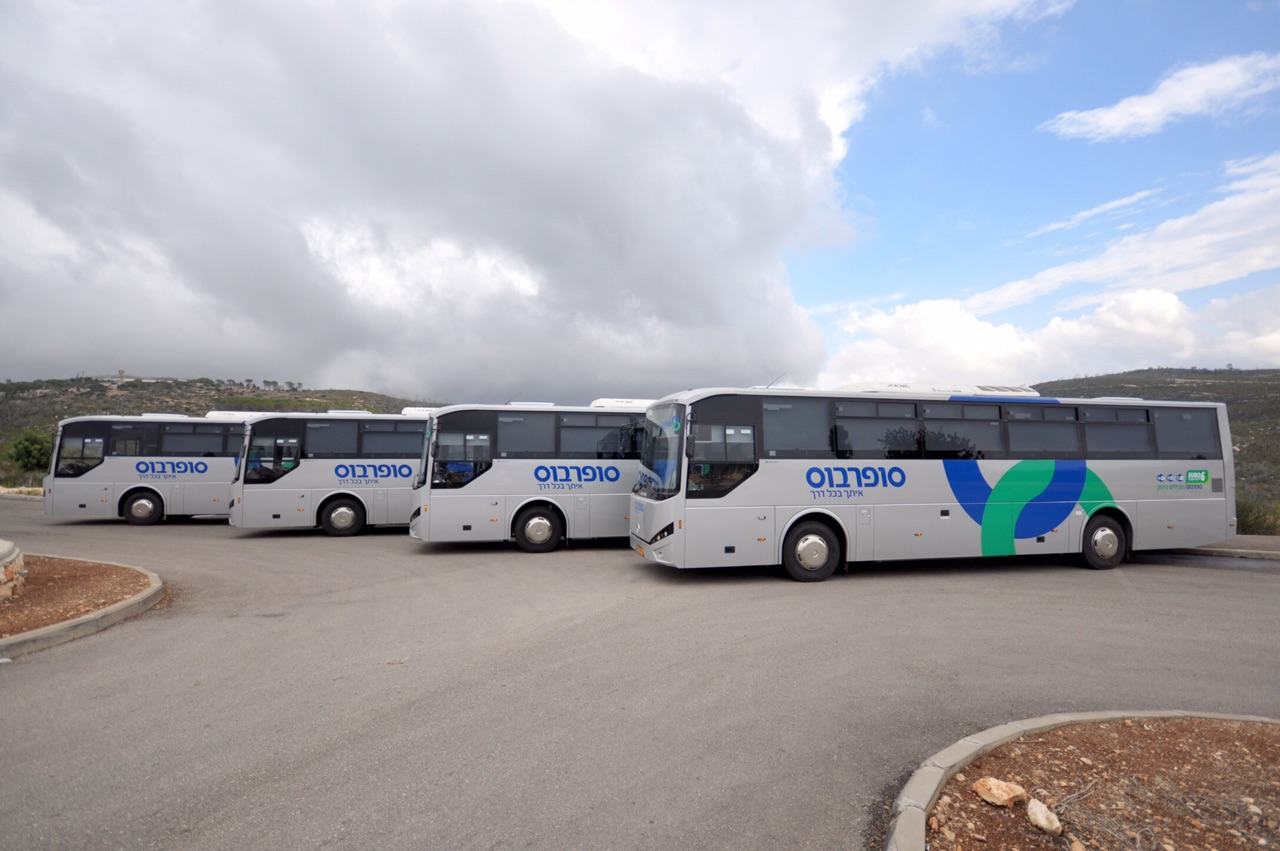
Superbus buses in 2014

The company owns 2000 buses and employs about 2500 employees in three branches – Afula, Yokneam Jerusalem. The company has three parking garages – two in the Tel Aviv Central Bus Station in Tel Aviv, and one in Afula and one at the Jerusalem Central Bus Station.

The company also operates special trips to Jerusalem employing about 20 drivers who operate 16 minibuses and 4 full-size buses. The company also operates specialty lines to transport students.

== Payments ==
All Superbus services accept the Rav-Kav smart card as payment, which operates on the rest of public transportation in Israel, beginning with the Beit Shemesh and Jerusalem corridor lines from 2008, and the Ramla–Lod–Matityahu from 2011.

Previous Superbus logo

== Criticism ==
=== Involvement in Israeli settlements ===
On 12 February 2020, the United Nations published a database of companies doing business related in the West Bank, including East Jerusalem, as well as in the occupied Golan Heights. Superbus was listed on the database on account of its activities in Israeli settlements in these occupied territories, which are considered illegal under international law.
