= Mer Group =

Israeli holding company

Mer Group Ltd.
- Company type: Public
- Traded as: TASE: CMER
- Industry: Manufacturing, Telecom, Construction, Civil Engineering, Public Safety, Security and Surveillance, Defense, Renewable Energy
- Founded: Israel, 1982
- Headquarters: Or Yehuda, Israel
- Products: Telecom Towers, RoIP systems
- Website: mer-group.com

Mer Group Ltd. is an Israeli holding company comprising 3 autonomous business divisions, each headed by a company with subsidiaries, manufacturing facilities and logistics chains.

== History ==
The company's share are traded on the Tel Aviv Stock Exchange. Mer Group has more than 30 subsidiaries. The company provides products for cellular networks (including telecom towers design and manufacture, civil engineering and telecom implementation services), large scale security projects and broadband network technology.

On 12 February 2020, the United Nations published a database of companies doing business related in the West Bank, including East Jerusalem, as well as in the occupied Golan Heights. Mer Group was listed on the database on account of its activities in Israeli settlements in these occupied territories, which are considered illegal under international law.

== See also ==
- List of companies operating in West Bank settlements
- Economy of Israel
