= Egis Group =

French engineering company

- Industry: Engineering, consulting, operation services
- Headquarters: Guyancourt, France
- Key people: Laurent Germain (CEO); Olivier Gouirand (CFO)
- Revenue: ▲€2.164 billion (2024)
- Net income: ▲€77 million (2024)
- Owners: Tikehau Capital (40%); Caisse des Dépôts (34%); Egis’ executive partners and employees (26%)
- Number of employees: ▲20 500 (2025)
- Website: egis-group.com

Egis is an international company active in the consulting, construction engineering and mobility service sectors that design and operate intelligent infrastructure and buildings. Egis operates in 100 countries and has 19,500 employees.

In the global Engineering News-Record (ENR) ranking, Egis is given the 1st position in France and the 8th position globally in the Transportation sector. Overall, Egis is ranked 21st within the top Global Design Firms.

== History ==
During early 2018, amid the liquidation of Carillion, Egis Group acquired the firm’s 30-year contract to operate and maintained the M40 motorway.

In January 2022, Tikehau Capital acquired 40% stake in Egis from the former majority shareholder Caisse des Dépôts, an investment arm of the French state.

== Acquisitions ==
In 2019, Egis purchased the Hong Kong-based engineering firm Inhabit.

In 2020, two French companies joined Egis: Est Signalization a railway signaling works company and Kanopée SAS, a consulting firm in the hotel, tourism & leisure industries.

In 2021, Egis acquired two companies in United Kingdom: CPMS TOPCO and its operational arm, Collaborative Project Management Services Limited to become a key player in the U.K. rail and infrastructure market and Galson Sciences Ltd, an international consulting and research firm based in Oakham and specializing in radioactive waste management and disposal. In the Middle East, Egis completed the acquisition of Projacs International, a local engineering consultancy and project management company, by increasing its ownership stake in the firm to 95.45%. In Australia, Australian strategic advisory, project delivery and technical services consultancy Indec joined Egis. In France, Egis acquired MT3, a consulting and engineering company in mobility and related applications, and 3 companies in the building sector: Openergy(digitization of energy performance), Kern (organization and operation management) as well as AD Ingé and AD Conseil (asbestos removal, deconstruction & circular economy). In Asia, Egis acquired Sunland (Hong Kong), a consulting and building engineering company with 130 employees.

In 2022, Egis acquired several companies. In the US, SB Architects, the architecture and design practice specialising in creating international hospitality destinations. In the Middle East, Waagner Biro Bridge Services International, an infrastructure engineering, operation and maintenance company, WME, a multi-disciplinary engineering consultancies and U+A, a multi disciplinary architectural consultancy. In Europe: Weston Williamson + Partners (United Kingdom), an international architecture and urban design firm; AG Concept (France), an engineering firm specialized in cleanrooms; NordSignal (France), specializing in railway signaling; Nebu Transport Services (Netherlands), specialized in the recovery of VAT and excise duties in the Benelux. In Latin America: Payc (Colombia), the engineering leader in Colombian building sector. In December 2022, Egis has started the acquisition process for two companies: New Zealand’s Calibre Professional Services and the Middle Eastern arm of design practice U+A.

== Criticism ==
=== Involvement in Israeli settlements ===
On 12 February 2020, the United Nations published a database of companies doing business related in the West Bank, including East Jerusalem, as well as in the occupied Golan Heights. The Egis Group was listed on the database on account of the activities of its subsidy Egis Rail Israel in Israeli settlements in these occupied territories, which are considered illegal under international law.

=== Sanctions ===
During early 2024, Egis Eau S.A.S. and Egis International S.A.S. were sanctioned by the Inter-American Development Bank (IDB) for three years in connection with allegations of fraudulent and corrupt practices. In consequence, both Egis Eau S.A.S. and Egis International S.A.S. are to be included in the Asian Development Bank's (ADB) cross debarment list until 2 January 2027.
