= Amisragas =

LP gas retailer in Israel

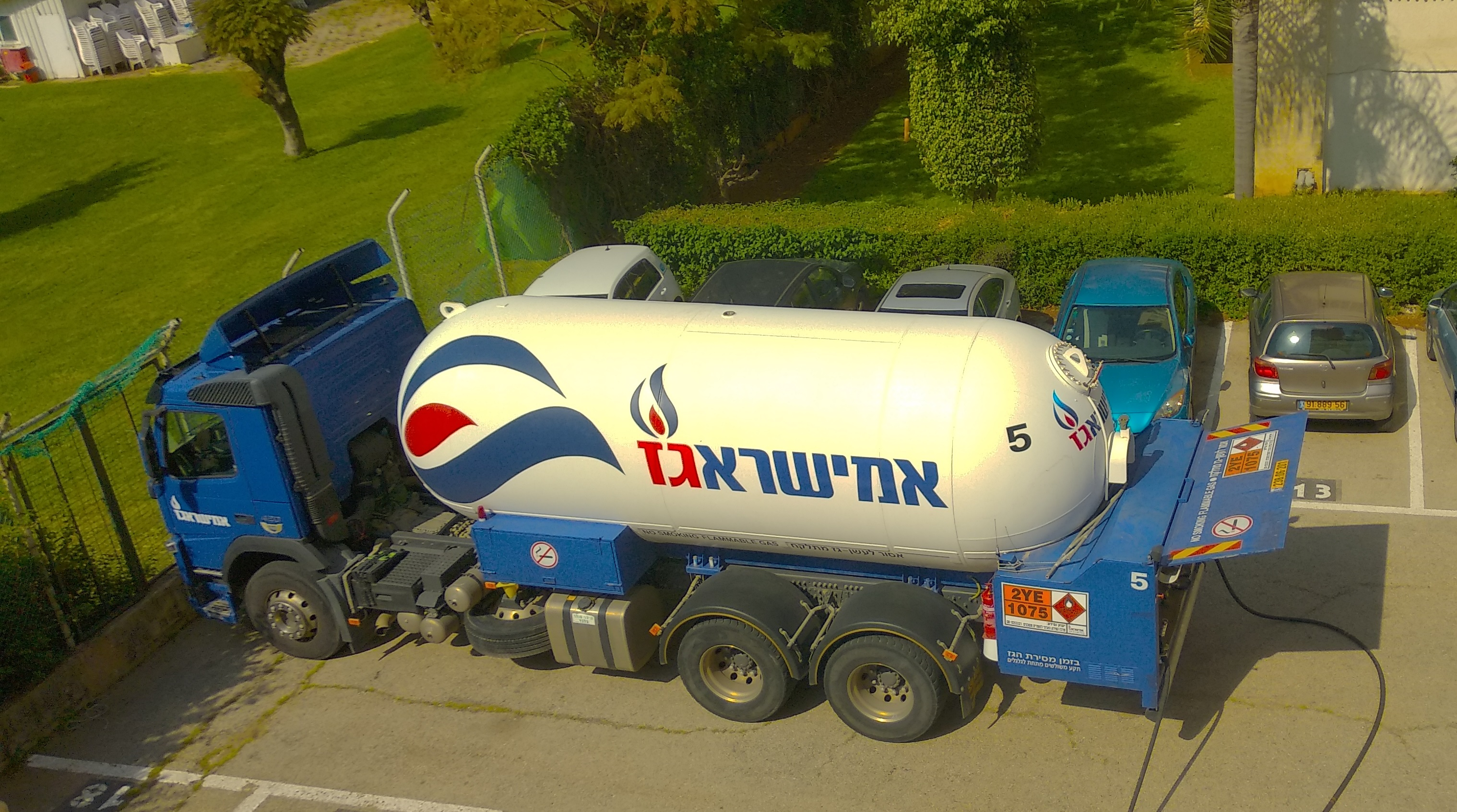
- Amisragas gas tank truck
- Company type: Private
- Industry: Energy
- Headquarters: Tel Aviv, Israel
- Area served: Israel, West Bank
- Services: Gas distribution
- Website: www.amisragas.co.il

The American Israeli Gas Corporation, or Amisragas, is the largest liquified petroleum gas (LPG) retailer in Israel, operating two filling and storage plants in the south and north of Israel, and managing a nationwide network of delivery trucks and more than 100 independent retail outlets. American Israeli Gas Corporation was established in January 1949.

On 12 February 2020, the United Nations published a database of 112 companies helping to further Israeli settlement activity in the West Bank, including East Jerusalem, as well as in the occupied Golan Heights. These settlements are considered illegal under international law. Amisragas was listed on the database on account of its "provision of services and utilities supporting the maintenance and existence of settlements, including transport" and "use of natural resources, in particular water and land, for business purposes" in these occupied territories.

== See also ==
- List of companies operating in West Bank settlements
