= Merkavim =

Israeli bus manufacturer

Merkavim Transportation Technologies Ltd
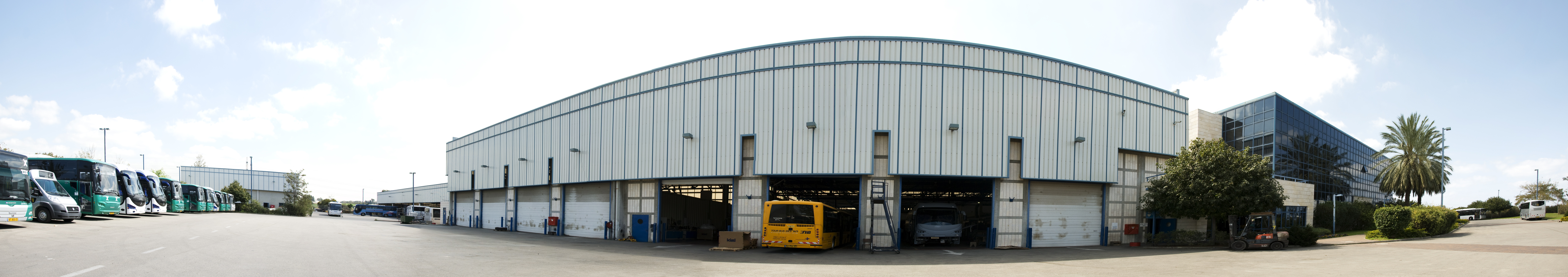
- Merkavim factory in Caesarea
- Native name: מרכבים
- Company type: Bus manufacturer
- Industry: Transport
- Founded: 1949; 77 years ago
- Headquarters: Caesarea, Israel
- Production output: 760 (2013)
- Number of employees: 700
- Website: Merkavim

Merkavim Transportation Technologies Ltd., shortened to Merkavim (Hebrew: מרכבים), is the largest bus manufacturing company in Israel. They produce many different types of buses, including tourism coaches, urban buses, long-distance buses and minibuses. In addition to this, they also provide specialist buses, such as bullet-proof buses, prisoner-transport vehicles and VIP transport vehicles. The company was founded in 1946 and is jointly owned by Israeli vehicle-importer Mayer Cars and Trucks and by AB Volvo.

== Bus models ==
=== Long distance buses ===
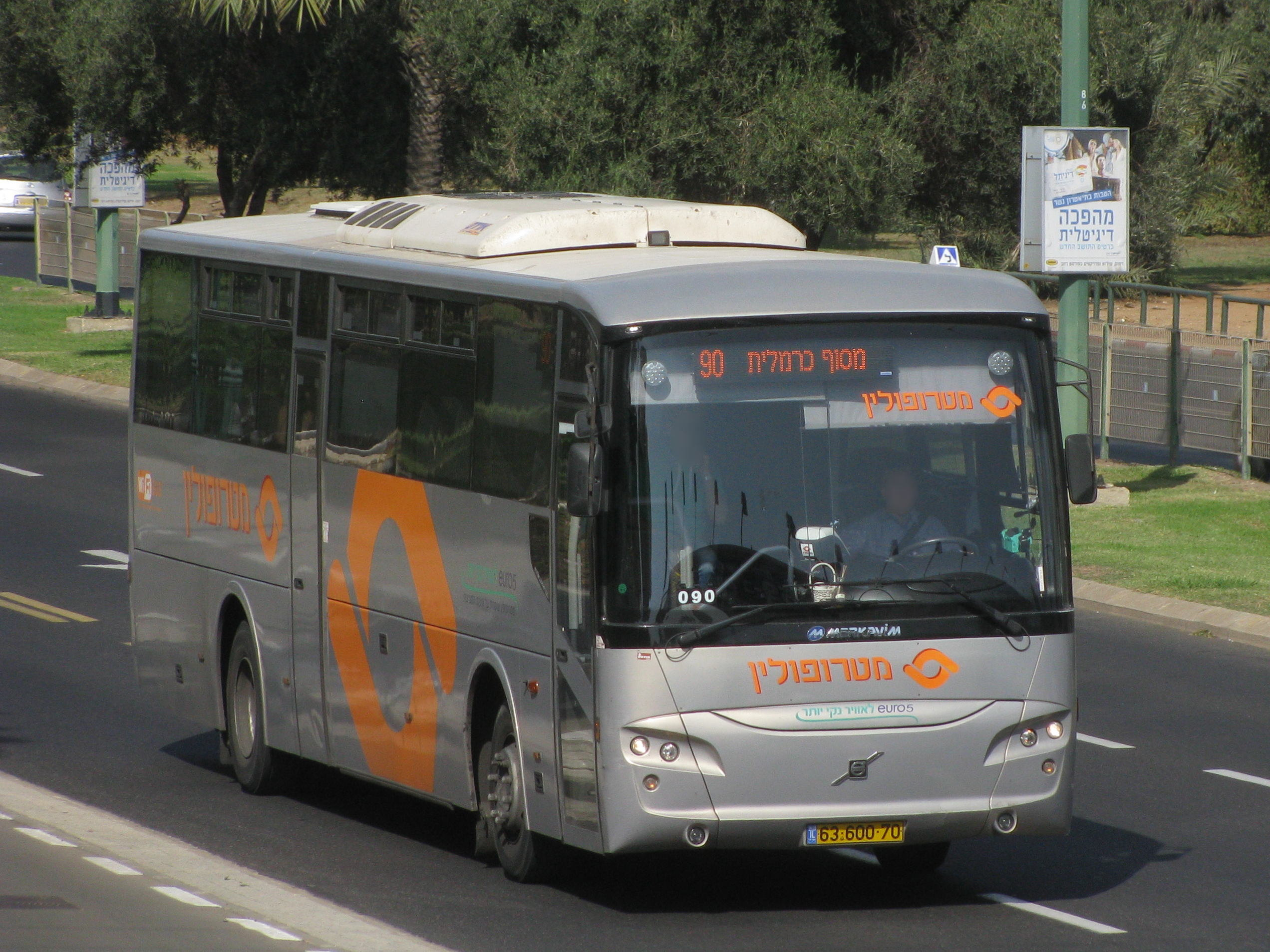
Merkavim Mars bus

- Mars - Intercity bus

=== City buses ===
- Low Entrance Pioneer - Low entry/floor bus on VDL SB230 Chassis and Volvo B7RLE Chassis Gearbox Is ZF Ecolife and Man A69 18.290 HOCL NL Gearbox is Voith D854.5 and Mercedes Benz OC500LE Gearbox ZF Ecolife and MAN RC2 19.290 HOCL and Volvo B8RLE ZF Ecolife Transmission
- Low Floor NL
- Articulated BRT
- Low Floor Mercury- On Volvo B7L Chassis With Voith D864.3E

=== Coaches ===
- Apollo - Coach for tourism and special rides
- Apollo Premium - A new version of the Apollo

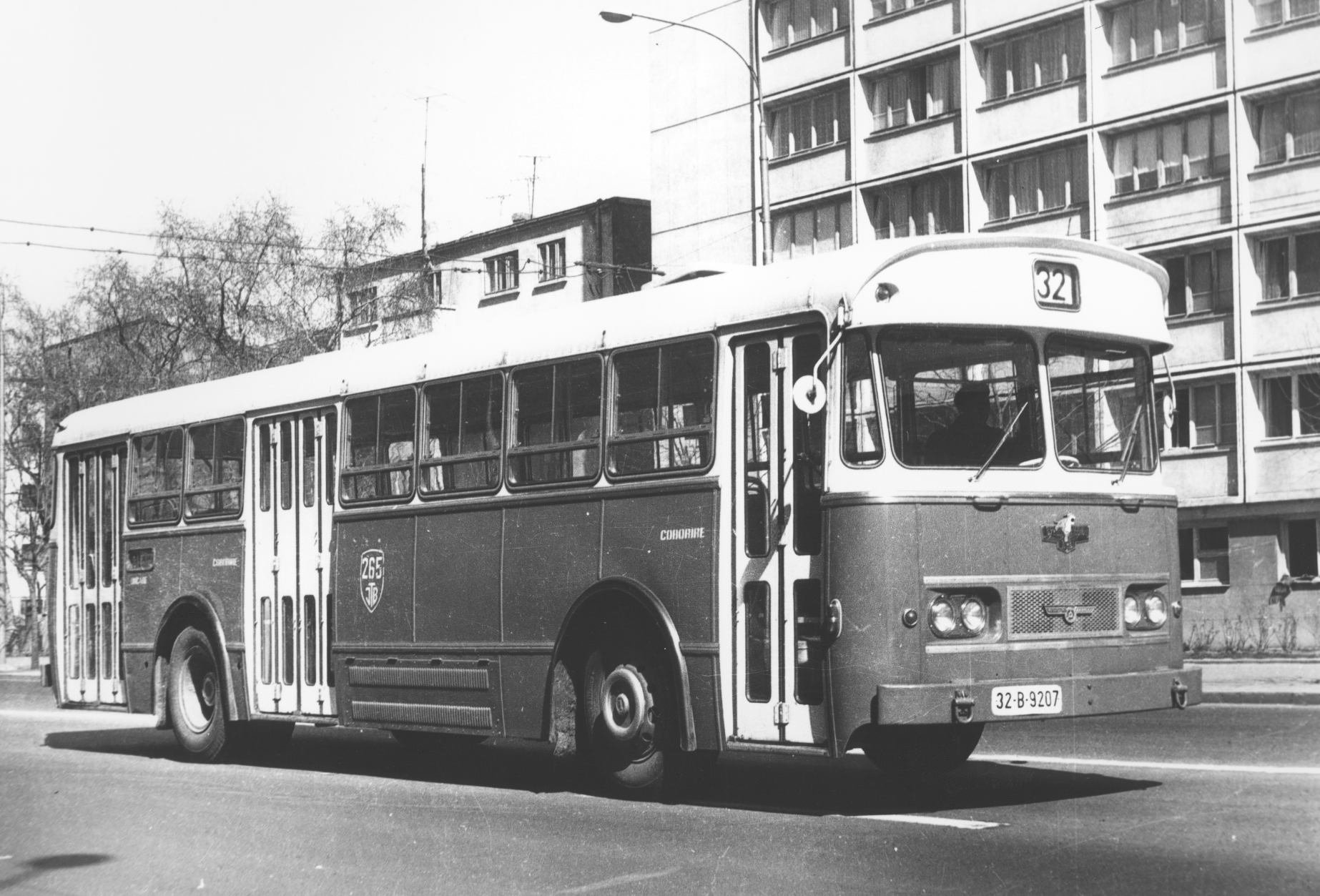
Leyland Panther with Merkavim bodywork in Bucharest in the early 1970s

=== Minibuses ===
- City 22 - Minibus based on Mercedes-Benz Sprinter
- CORAL - shuttle minibus based on Mercedes-Benz Sprinter

=== Armored buses ===
- Mars Defender - Double rear axle

=== Special Models ===
- Apollo Premium VIP to business rides
- Mobile Library
- Prisoner Bus

== Criticism ==
=== Involvement in Israeli settlements ===
On 12 February 2020, the United Nations published a database of companies doing business related in the West Bank, including East Jerusalem, as well as in the Golan Heights. Merkavim was listed on the database on account of its activities in Israeli settlements in these territories,.

== See also ==
- Ha'argaz, another Israeli bus manufacturer
