= Metropoline =

Transport company

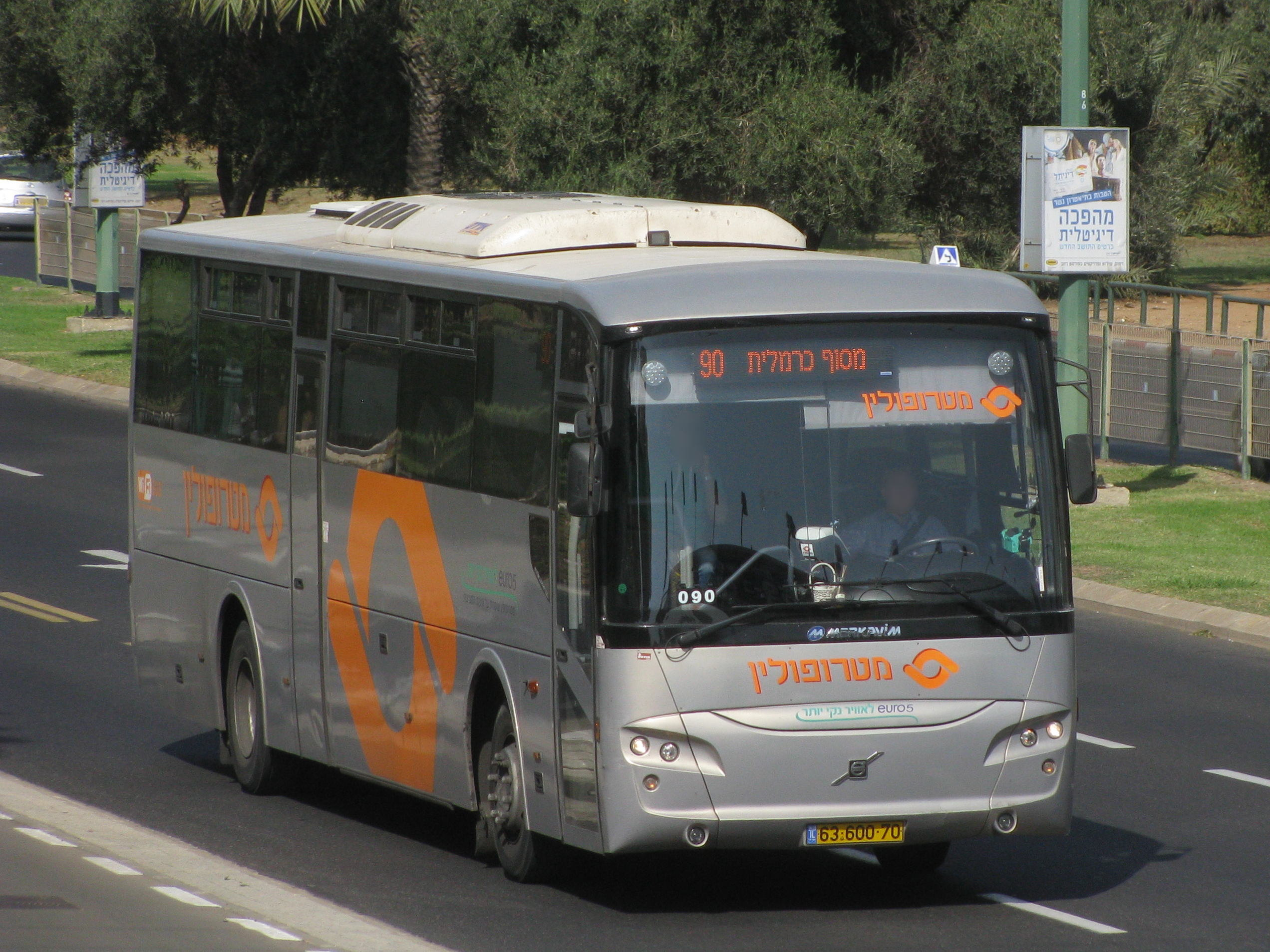
- Founded: 2000
- Headquarters: Kfar Saba, Israel
- Service area: Beersheba; Tel Aviv; Southern District; Herzliya; Hod HaSharon; Ra'anana; Kfar Saba; Southern HaSharon; Netanya; Holon; Ramat Hasharon; Rishon LeZion; Kiryat Ono; Or Yehuda; Yehud-Monosson; Ganei Tikva; Savyon; Giv'at Shmuel; Petah Tikva; El'ad
- Service type: bus service
- Routes: 96 (January 2014)
- Website: metropoline.com

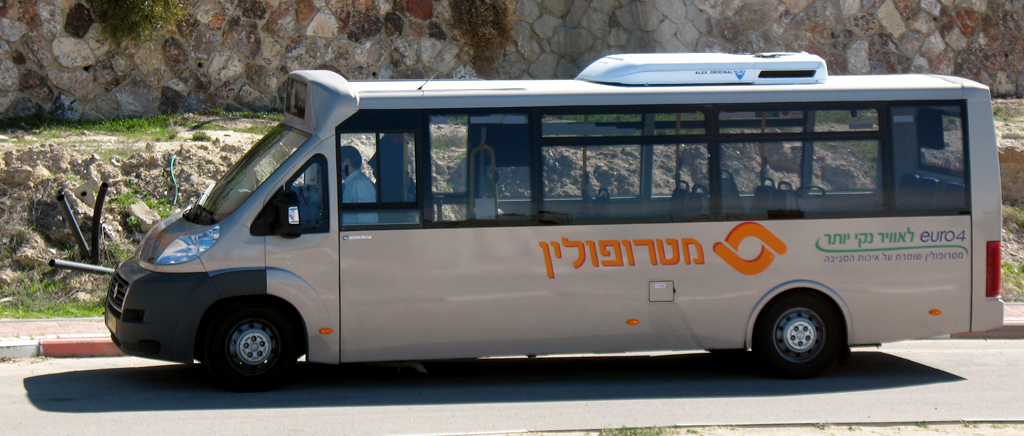
Local service minibus in Arad

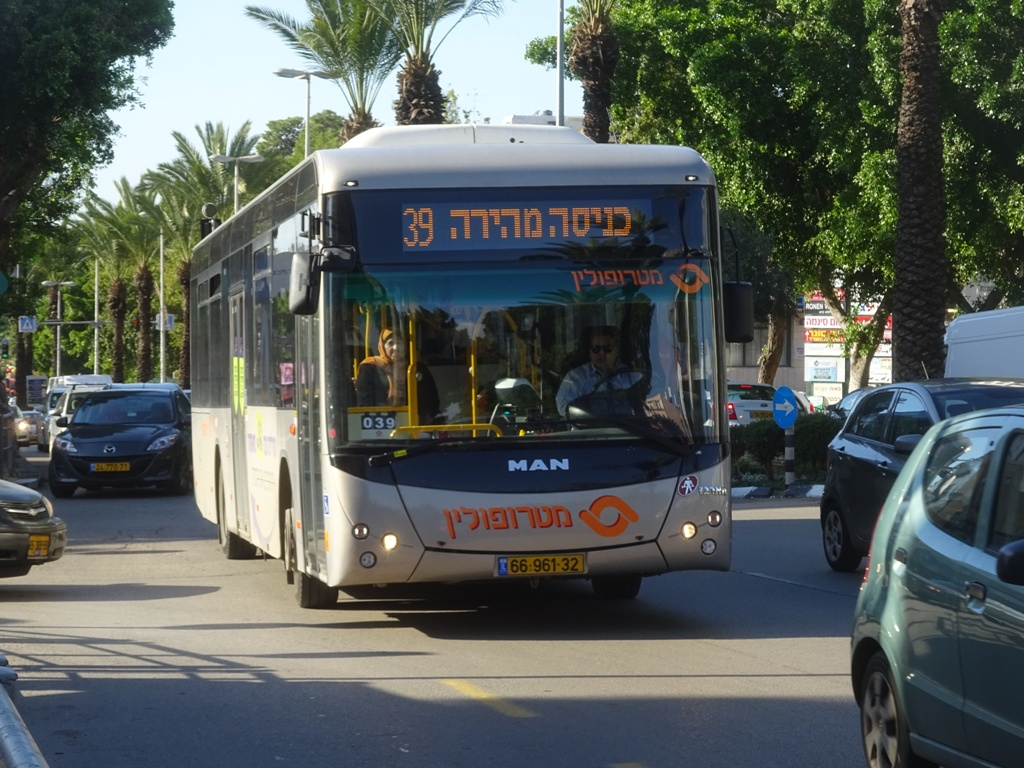
A bus on route 39 in Ra'anana

Metropoline (Hebrew: מטרופולין) is an Israeli bus company, which provides bus routes from Beersheba to Tel Aviv and other destinations in the Southern District, Intracity and intercity routes in the Negev region, Southern Sharon region, (Note: The southern Sharon region includes: Herzliya, Ra'anana, Ramat HaSharon, Kfar Saba, Hod HaSharon and more) Ono Valley region (Note: The Ono Valley region includes: Kiryat Ono, Or Yehuda, Yehud-Monosson, Savyon, Ganei Tikva and more) and El'ad.

== History ==
=== 2000s and founding ===
Metropoline was founded in 2000 by Tour Bus and two other transportation companies. In 2002, the company started to operate the intercity routes from BeerSheva to Tel Aviv and other destinations in the Southern District and the intracity service in Arad.

=== 2010s ===
In 2010, Metropoline won the tender of Southern HaSharon which contained most intracity and regional service in Ramat HaSharon, Herzliya, Hod HaSharon, Ra'anana and Kfar Saba. In the same year Metropoline started to operate 7 routes that were transferred from Dan, and In early January 2011 Metropoline started to operate the routes that were transferred from Egged that were included in the tender. In 2012, Metropoline won again the tender of the Negev which contained all routes that Metropoline operated in the Southern District.

In July 2017, Metropoline won the tender of Sharon-Holon Regional which contains Netanya Tel Aviv routes were operated by Nateev Express, All Egged bus routes in Southern HaSharon, 4 bus routes of Dan in northern Tel Aviv and 4 bus routes of Egged in Holon.

In July 2018, Metropoline started to operate the Netanya Tel Aviv bus routes that were operated by Nateev Express.

In March 2019 Metropoline started to operate 3 bus routes that were operated by Egged with few additional new bus routes.

=== 2020s ===
In March 2023, Metropoline won the tender of Ono Valley (Note: The Ono Valley contains: Kiryat Ono, Or Yehuda, Yehud, Savyon, Ganei Tikva and Giv'at Shmuel)-El'ad Regional which contains all routes that were operated by Kavim in the Ono Valley and El'ad, 3 bus routes of Dan in the same region, and all intercity routes from El'ad.

In June 2023, Metropoline began operating intracity and intrercity services in El'ad, as well as three lines from Ben Gurion Airport to various destinations in Gush Dan.

In October 2023, Metropoline began operating 8 lines in the Ono Valley region. Metropoline began operating the rest of the lines in January 2024.
