= Cellcom =

Celcom or Cellcom may refer to:

- Celcom, a defunct Malaysian telecommunications company
- Cellcom Communications, a Canadian telecommunications company based in Montreal, Quebec
- Cellcom (Israel), a cellular service provider in Israel
- Cellcom (United States), a cellular service provider in Wisconsin, United States
