= Nateev Express =

Israeli bus company

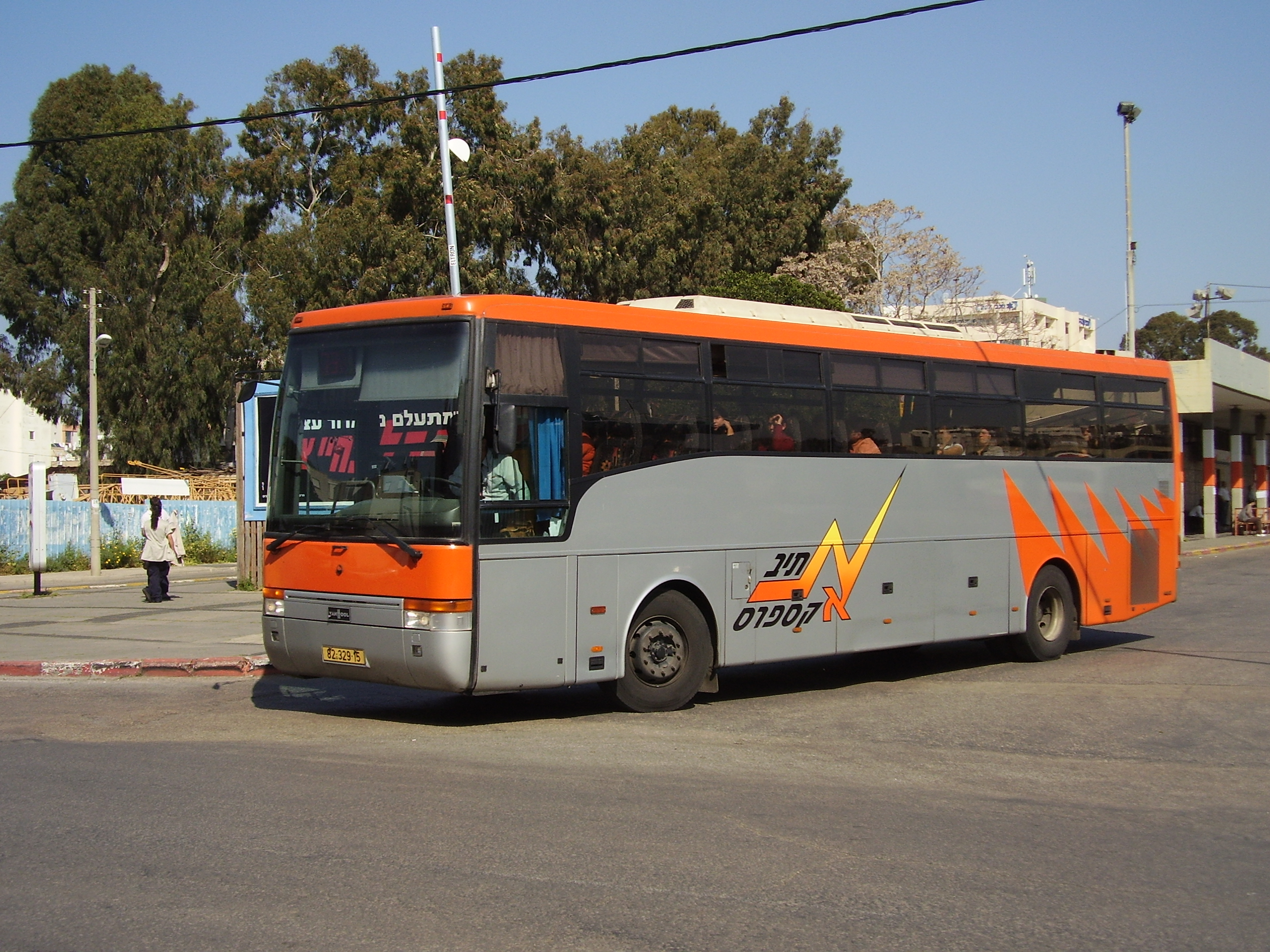
Setra coach

Nateev Express (Hebrew: נתיב אקספרס, Arabic: نتيف أكسبريس) is an Israeli bus company.

== History ==
Nateev Express was founded in 2001. Shortly afterwards, it won the franchises for these two regions, previously served by Egged, as part of a national policy led by the ministry of transportation to spread the public transportation among multiple companies. Nateev Express started operating the bus lines in the northern Sharon area on December 31, 2001, and in the upper Galilee on January 28, 2002.

In July 2013, Carasso Motors acquired 50% ownership of the company. In March 2016, Carasso Motors sold its stake back to the Afifi family.

In July 2018 the Netanya Tel Aviv bus routes were transferred to Metropoline as Metropoline won the Sharon Holon tender that contains these routes. In October 2020 Nateev Express won the tender for the Beit Shemesh corridor. The lines will be transferred from Superbus to Nateev Express on June 14, 2021.

Nateev Express is fully owned by Nazareth Transportation and Tours, a bus company based in Nazareth.

It serves regional routes in a single region of the country:

- The upper Galilee, with hubs at Safed and Nahariya.

The company also serves all intercity lines inside Nahariya, Safed and Ma'alot.

As well as operating in Israel, as of 2023 the company operates in Aveiro region, through the subsidiary Busway.
