= Kavim =

Israeli bus company

- The logo of Kavim
- Founded: 2000; 26 years ago
- Headquarters: Holon, Israel
- Service area: Ono Valley; Beitar Illit; Sharon plain Shfela
- Annual ridership: 87,200,000
- Chief executive: Zion Pat
- Website: (Hebrew Website)

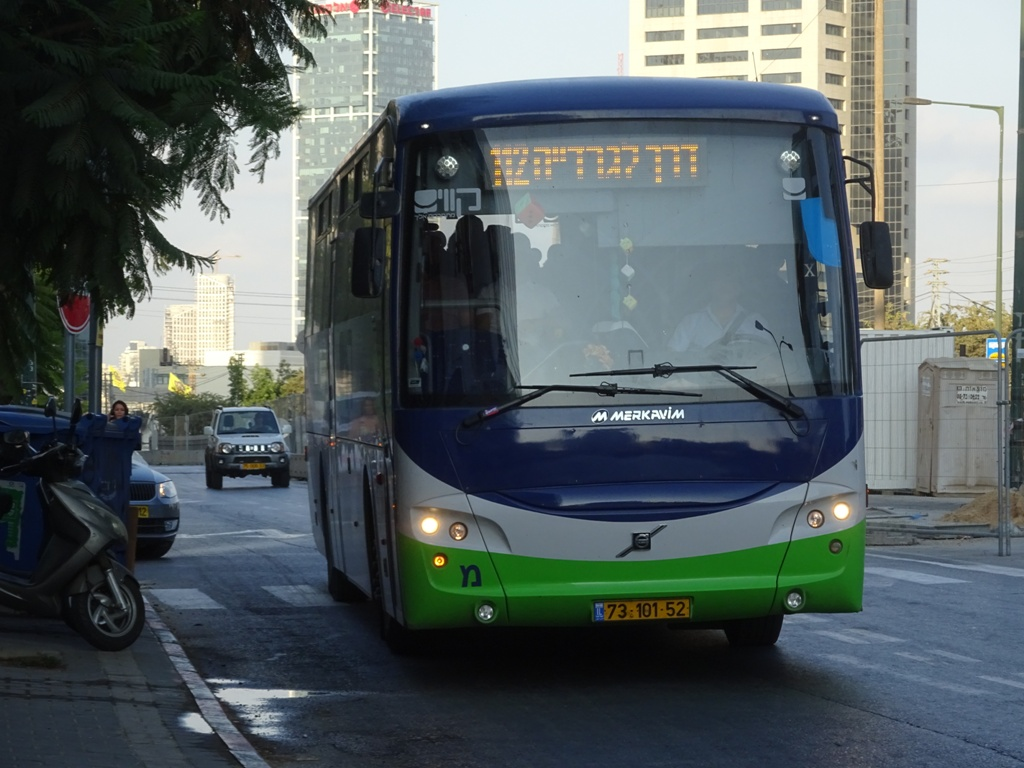
Kavim bus on route 112 to Modi'in

Kavim (Hebrew: קווים, lit. '"lines"') is an Israeli bus company based in Holon. It was founded in 2000 and provided lines in the eastern Gush Dan region - the towns/cities Kiryat Ono, Petah Tikva, Or Yehuda, Givatayim and others. In February 2005, Kavim expanded to the north, where it started providing bus lines in Afula, Bet She'an and the Nazareth area. In 2006, more routes are planned in Petah Tikva and Rosh HaAyin. Many of Kavim's current routes were transferred from the Dan Bus Company. In 2011, the bus company Illit was merged with Kavim. In 2012, Kavim won the tender for the Heshmonaim cluster which includes the cities Ramla, Lod and Modi'in, and the tender for cluster of regional bus routes in the Netanya Hadera area. Kavim started the operate the routes in both clusters in 2013. In 2015, Kavim's bus routes in Afula were transferred to Superbus bus company. In 2017, Kavim won the tender of the Valley of Elah and Beitar Illit cluster that contains routes that Kavim currently operates and few routes of Superbus in the Beit Shemesh area.

Kavim has a fleet of 300 vehicles and a workforce of 450. Kavim's current chief executive officer is Zion Pat.

== Ridership by sector ==
In 2017, each sector had the following annual ridership:

| Sector | Ridership (in millions) |
|---|---|
| Lod–Ramla–Modi'in | 34.1 |
| Ono Valley and El'ad | 23.5 |
| Beitar Illit | 18.5 |
| Hadera–Netanya | 11.1 |

== Controversies and criticism ==
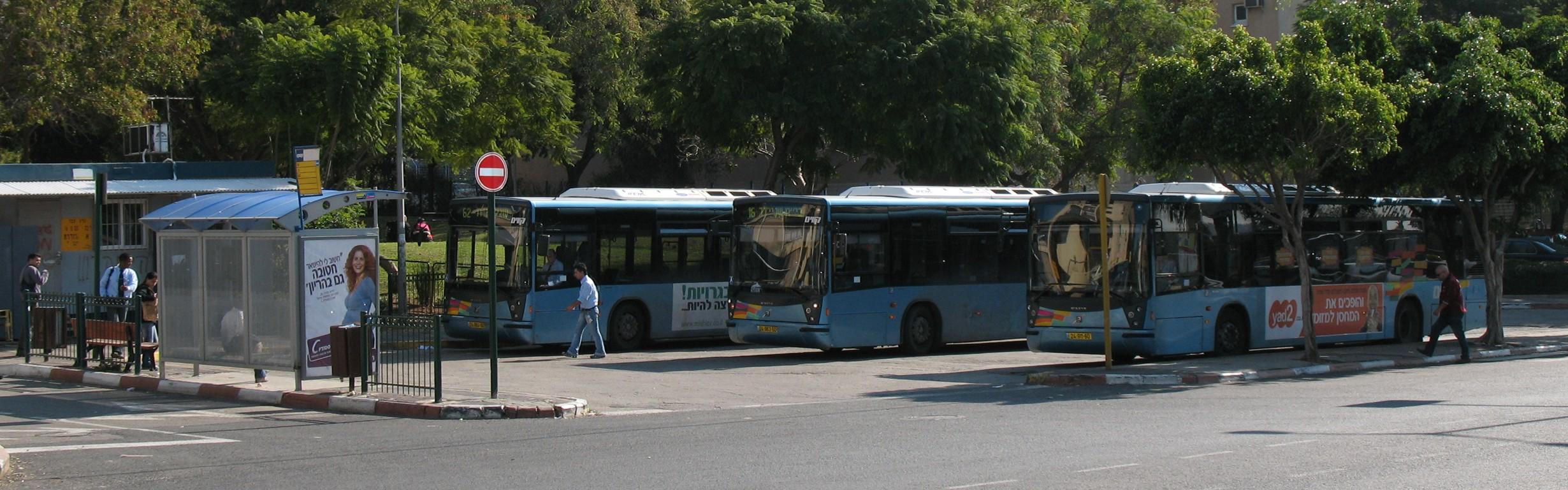
Kavim buses waiting at the Kaplan Terminal near the Beilinson Hospital in Petah Tikva

Kavim's service has often been criticized, especially in Petah Tikva. In April 2008, Avi Blustein, a member of the city council, proposed to create a committee which would inspect Kavim's operations within the city. Kavim responded that Blustein was 'hurting its good reputation out of political considerations'.

In 2008, a Kavim driver was arrested for dealing drugs on his bus routes. Kavim said in response that this did not reflect the company or its drivers.

On October 6, 2010, 30 buses belonging to Kavim in Afula were taken out of service following a raid by the police, due to severe safety violations, ranging from broken seats to worn out tires.

=== Involvement in Israeli settlements ===
On 12 February 2020, the United Nations published a database of companies doing business related in the West Bank, including East Jerusalem, as well as in the occupied Golan Heights. Kavim was listed on the database on account of its activities in Israeli settlements in these occupied territories, which are considered illegal under international law.
