= Illit (company) =

Israeli urban transport company

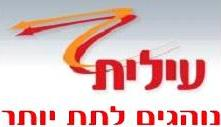
Illit company logo

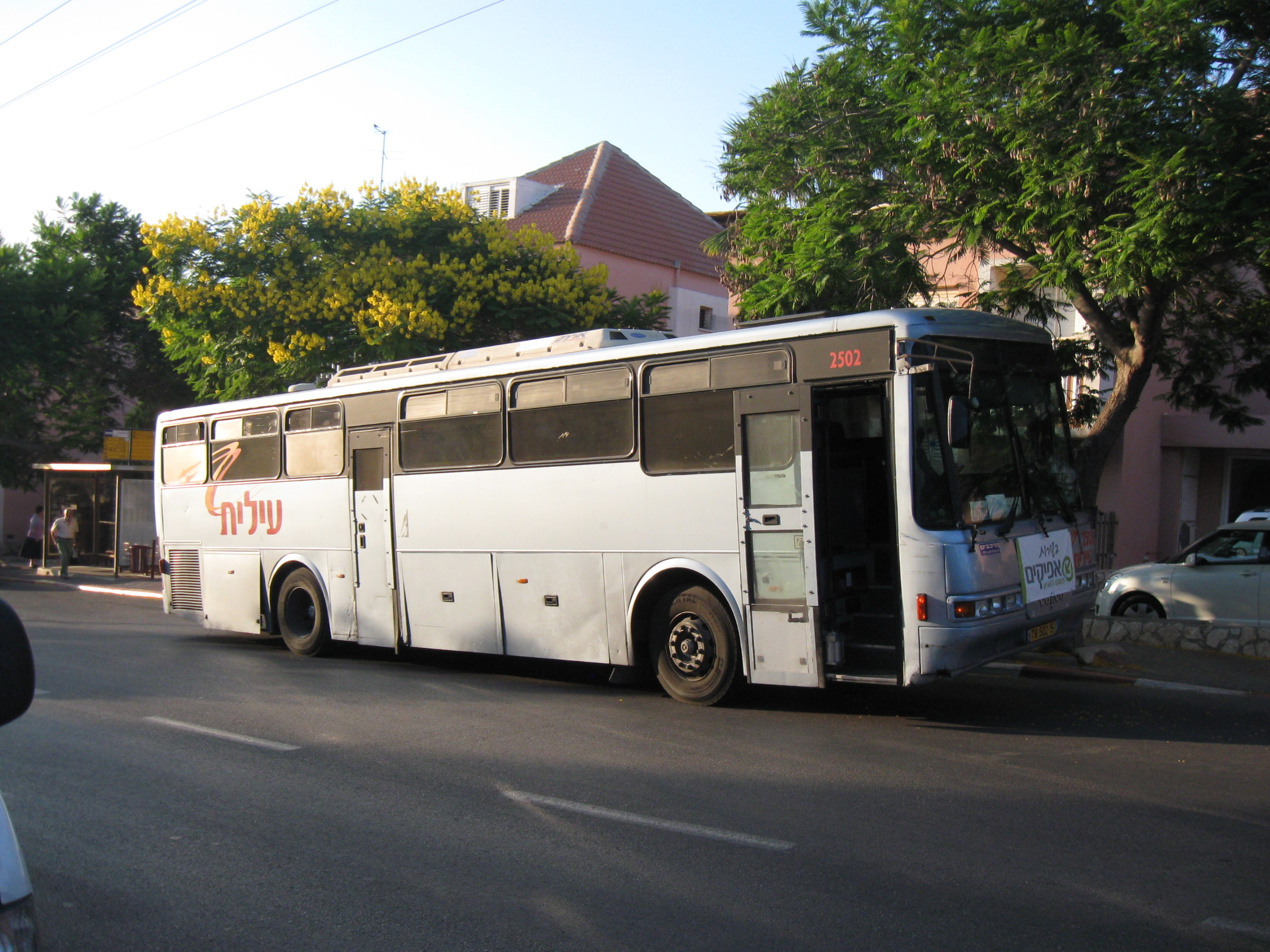
Illit bus

Illit Transport Ltd. (Hebrew: עילית קווי תחבורה בע"מ) was an Israeli bus company that operated in Beitar Illit. Illit was merged into Kavim in 2011, but Illit is still used as a brand for the Beitar Illit routes.

According to its official website, Illit was founded in 2005, winning its first tender to begin operations in 2006. It replaced 'Betar Tours', which had provided bus service to the city previously.

The company owned 80 buses, running 5 intracity lines including 3 lines for school children, 11 lines to Jerusalem, one to Beit Shemesh and one to Bnei Brak.
