= Cycling in Israel =

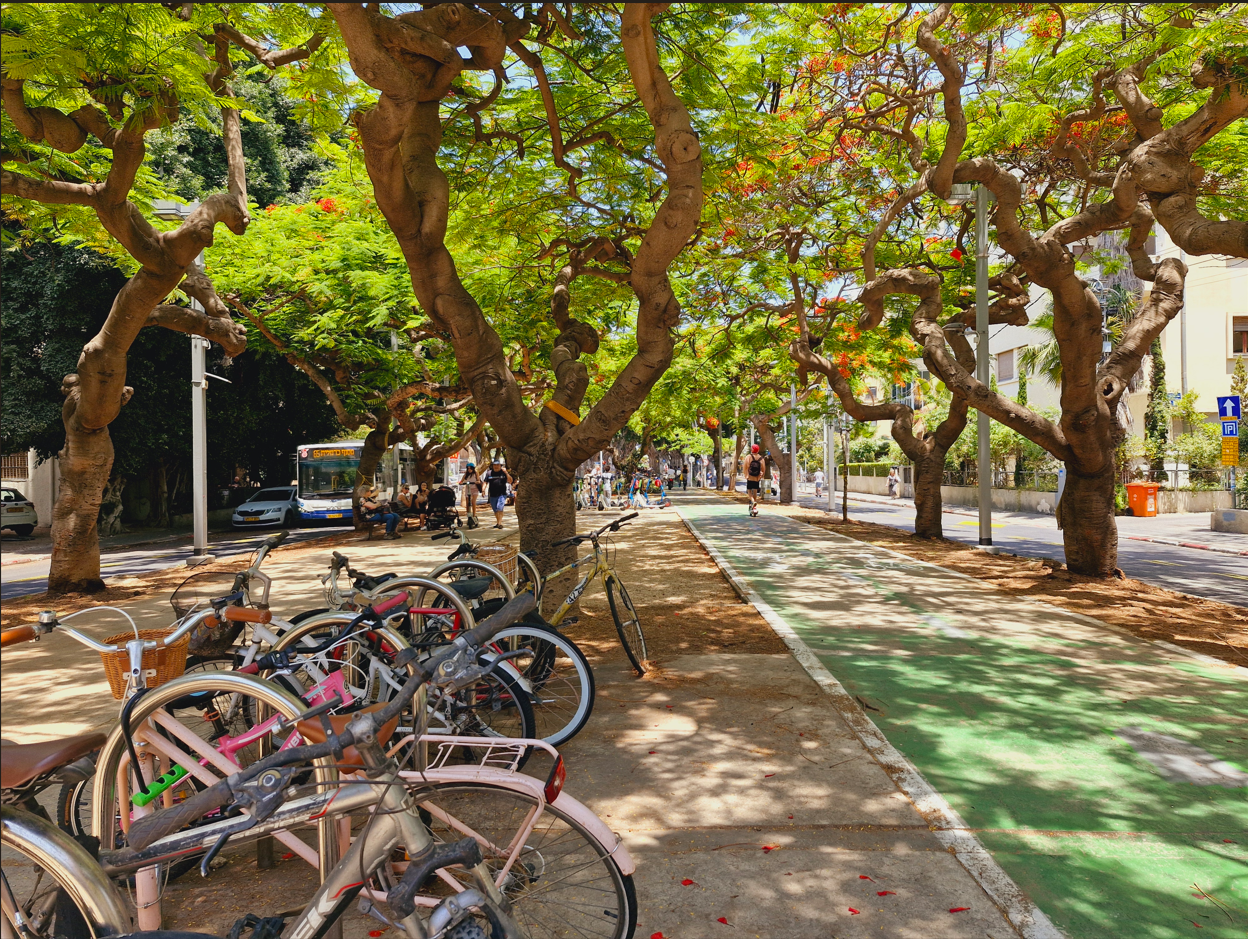
Bicycles parked next to a green cycling lane on Rothschild boulevard in Tel Aviv

Cycling in Israel refers to both the usage of bicycles for day to day transportation as well as cycling for sport in Israel or by Israelis. Cycling was popular in the coastal regions of Israel in the early 20th century, however following Israel's economic development and modernist car oriented planning, cycling fell out of popular use. The usage of bicycles for transportation has been growing in Israel in the early 21st century while Israel has hosted several cycling competitions as well as produced several renowned cycling champions.

== History ==
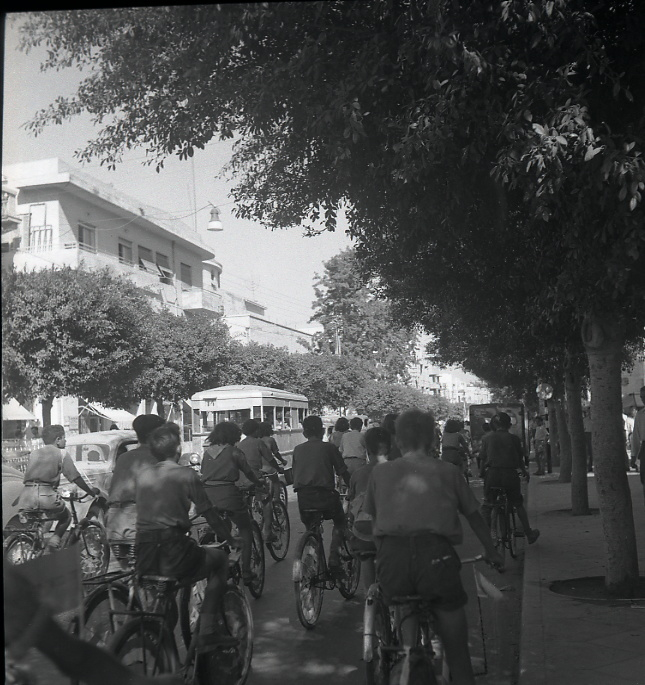
Cyclists in Tel Aviv, 1949

The introduction of bicycles to the region dates back to the late 19th century. Between 1890 and 1893, American students Thomas Gaskell Allen and William Lewis Sachtleben documented their journey across Asia Minor, including parts of the Middle East, on bicycles. Their travels highlighted the rarity of two-wheelers in the Ottoman Empire during that era.

In the early 20th century, prominent Zionist figures, including Theodor Herzl, were known to be cycling enthusiasts. During the British Mandate period the there was a growing adoption of cycling, during this period modern bicycles were first introduced to the region. Jewish sports organizations also promoted cycling as a sport. The Maccabi World Union, established in 1921, and Hapoel, founded in 1926, organized cycling events and competitions. Notably, the first Maccabiah Games in 1932 included cycling competitions, and Hapoel held its first road bike race the same year on the streets of Tel Aviv.

In the early 21st century, cycling has seen a notable increase in popularity across Israel. Between 2012 and 2015, there was a 21% rise in the number of non-motorized two-wheeled vehicles imported into the country. In Tel Aviv, a 2012 survey revealed a 54% increase in bicycle usage since 2010. Approximately 18,000 residents reported using bicycles as their primary mode of transportation to work or school. In 2015, 15% of Tel Avivians cycled for their daily activities such as work. In 2019, Tel Aviv had the highest per capita usage of e-biks. In 2020, it was reported that 10% of Israelis make weekly usage of bikes and E-Bikes. In 2025, the percentage of commuters who cycled back and forth accounted for 17% of Tel Aviv residents.

== Notable days and events ==
Yom Kippur, a holy day of the Jewish calendar, motorized traffic comes to a halt across the country. Israelis, especially secular Israeli Jews and non-Jewish Israelis go out during the day to cycle, turning city streets into expansive bike paths for riders of all ages.

== Cities ==
=== Jerusalem ===
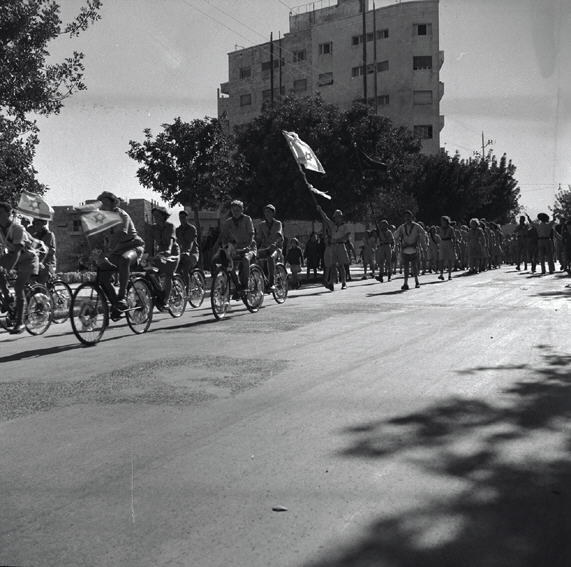
Cyclists in Jerusalem celebrating following announcement of UN partition plan and UN recognition of a Jewish state.

Jerusalem has 42 km of cycling infrastructure emcompassing the Jerusalem ring project. In 2022, the first cycling tunnel in Jerusalem was opened in Kerem pass. In 2020, Jerusalem advanced a plan to increase the number of bike paths to 120 km.

=== Tel Aviv ===
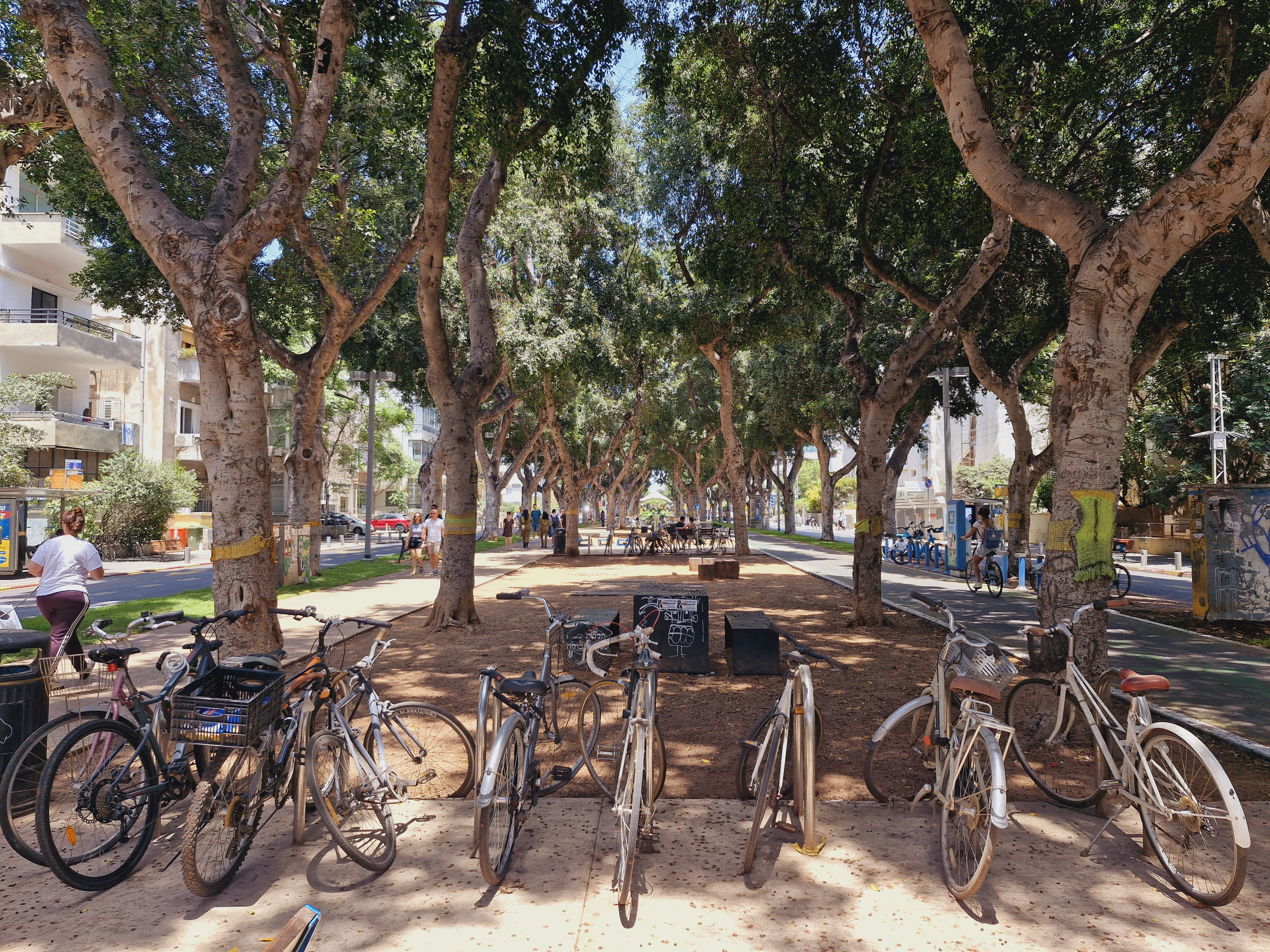
Bicyles parked in Rothschild boulevard

In the early 20th century, due to Tel Aviv's flat terrain and comfortable weather, cycling became the go to mode of transportation in the city. The economic costs of owning a car also contributed to the usage of cycling.

In the early 1990s, a group of cycling advocates proposed to the Tel Aviv city council the promotion of bicycles as a mode of urban transport. Initially met with skepticism and dismissed as impractical, cycling was seen as incompatible with the city's modern aspirations, with some officials characterizing it as appropriate only for less developed regions. Despite this resistance, persistent efforts by advocates, coupled with the gradual realization of cycling’s potential benefits, led to increased acceptance. By 2015, approximately 15% of central residents utilized bicycles for commuting. Initiatives such as the introduction of bike lanes and the establishment of the Tel-O-Fun bike-sharing program according to the Guardian have contributed to this cultural shift.

The development of cycling infrastructure in Tel Aviv has faced multiple challenges, including a dominant car culture, fragmented and inconsistent bike lane networks, and safety concerns. Initial bike lanes were often rudimentary, consisting of painted pathways with limited connectivity and frequent obstructions. Nevertheless, the construction of dedicated cycling infrastructure, including separated bike lanes and the incorporation of cycling considerations into urban planning, has led to a gradual increase in bicycle use. In 2025 Tel Aviv had 200 km of cycling infrastructure.

== Sport competitions ==
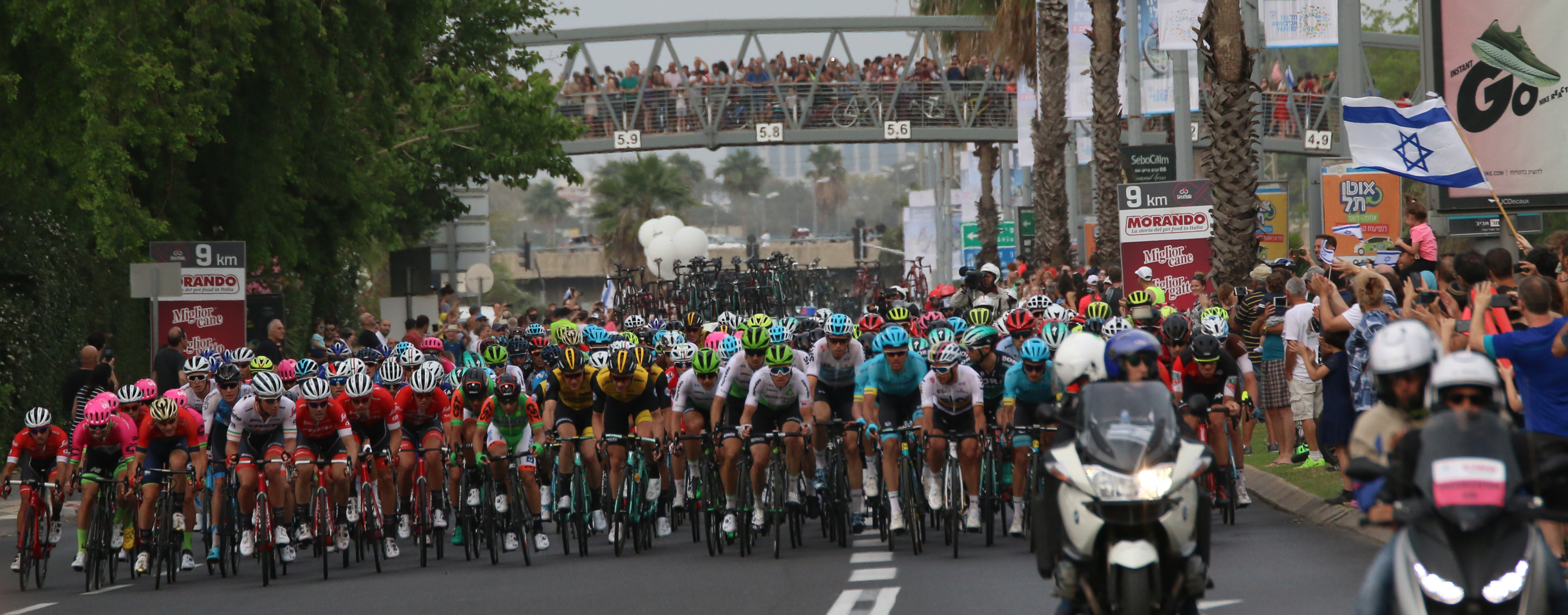
Giro d'Italia 2018, in Israel, picture taken in Tel Aviv

In 2018, Israel hosted the first three stages of the Giro d’Italia, marking the first time the prestigious race commenced outside Europe. The event brought 176 cyclists from 22 teams, including an Israeli team, to compete in time trials and road races that showcased Israel's landscapes. The opening 9.7-kilometer time trial in Jerusalem passed near significant landmarks while carefully avoiding politically sensitive areas. Subsequent stages took riders along a 167-kilometer coastal route from Haifa to Tel Aviv and a 229-kilometer leg from Beersheba to Eilat through the Negev Desert. Despite disruptions such as road closures and traffic congestion, the event was widely celebrated, drawing enthusiastic crowds and hundreds of international journalists. Organizers and local advocates told the Times of Israel that they hoped the Giro would inspire long-term growth in Israel's cycling culture.

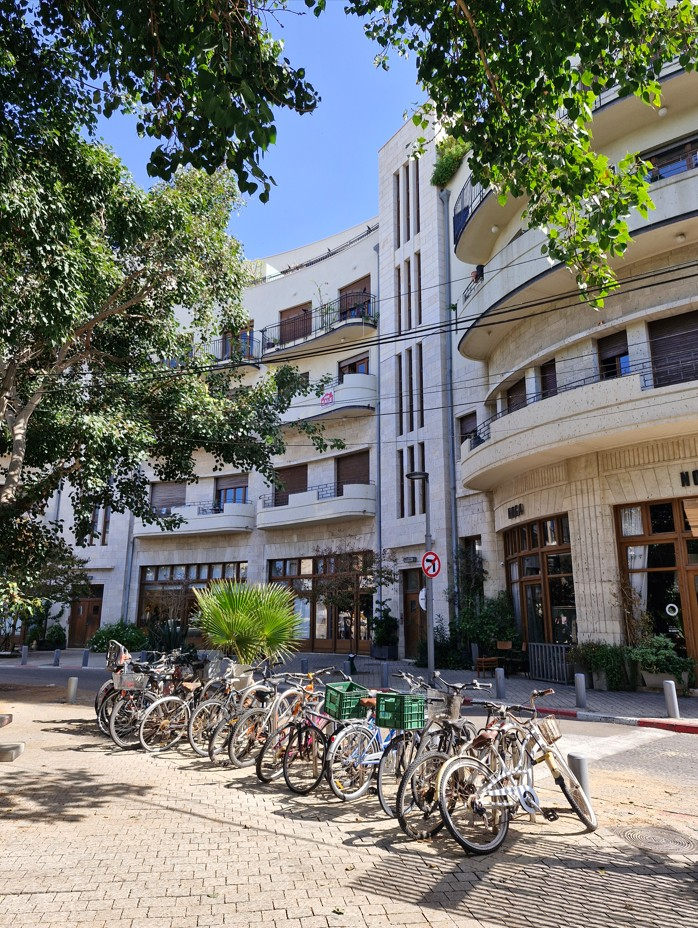
Bicycles parked in Tel Aviv Yaffo

Israel-Premier Tech is a professional cycling team based in Israel, co-owned by Sylvan Adams and Ron Baron. Established in 2014, the team has grown from a Continental-level squad to a prominent presence in international cycling. Notably, they made history in 2020 as the first Israeli team to compete in the Tour de France, with Guy Niv becoming the first Israeli rider to participate in the race . The team had stage wins at the Tour de France in 2022 and 2023. Israel-Premier Tech has a social project called "Field of Dreams" in Rwanda, which provides cycling infrastructure and training for youth. In 2025 the group competed in the UAE.

== See also ==
- Urban planning in Israel
- Transport in Israel
