= Transport in Israel =

Transportation networks and infrastructure in Israel

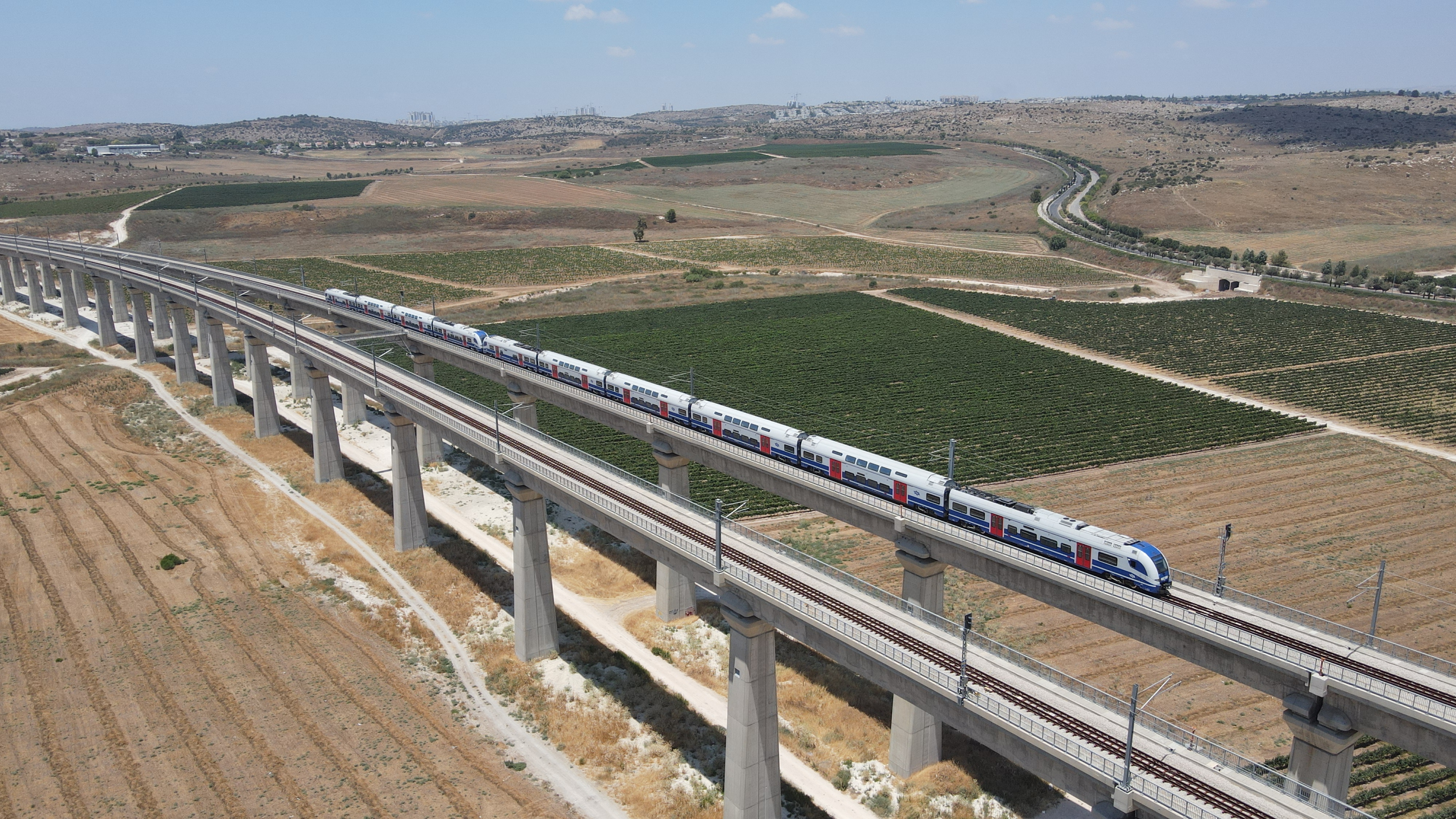
Electric train of Israel railways over the Ayalon valley

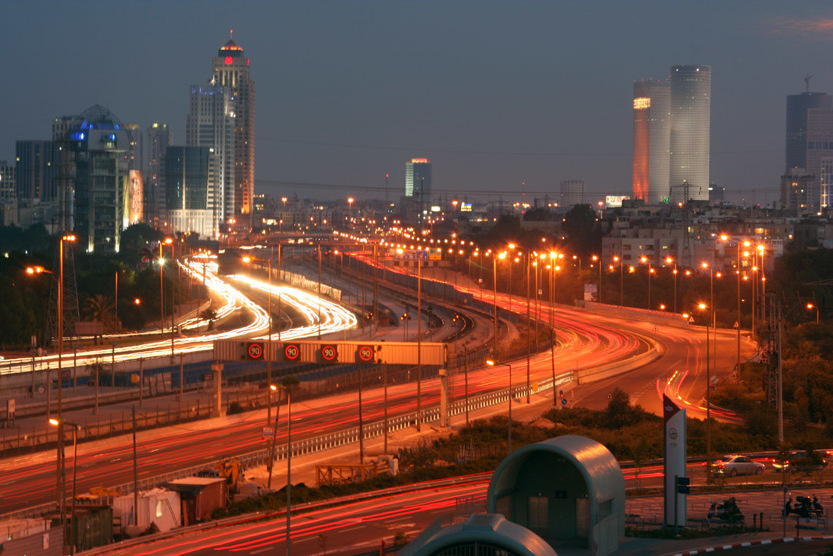
Ayalon Highway, Tel Aviv, 2004

Transportation in Israel primarily consists of nationwide rail transport, bus services, cycling (currently concentrating in the coast) as well as private vehicles. Most work related transportation in Israel is carried out by private motor vehicles, however in recent decades, Israel has prioritised the development of public transportation infrastructure. Cycling infrastructure is still primarily concentrated in the Tel Aviv region, while light rail operate currently in Jerusalem and Tel Aviv.

A lack of inland waterways and the small size of the country make air and water transport of only minor importance in domestic transportation, but they are vitally important for Israel's international transport links. Demands of population growth, political factors, the Israel Defense Forces, tourism and increased traffic set the pace for all sectors, being a major driver in the mobility transition towards railways and public transit while moving away from motorized road transport. All facets of transportation in Israel are under the supervision of the Ministry of Transport and Road Safety.

== Private transportation ==
=== Roads ===
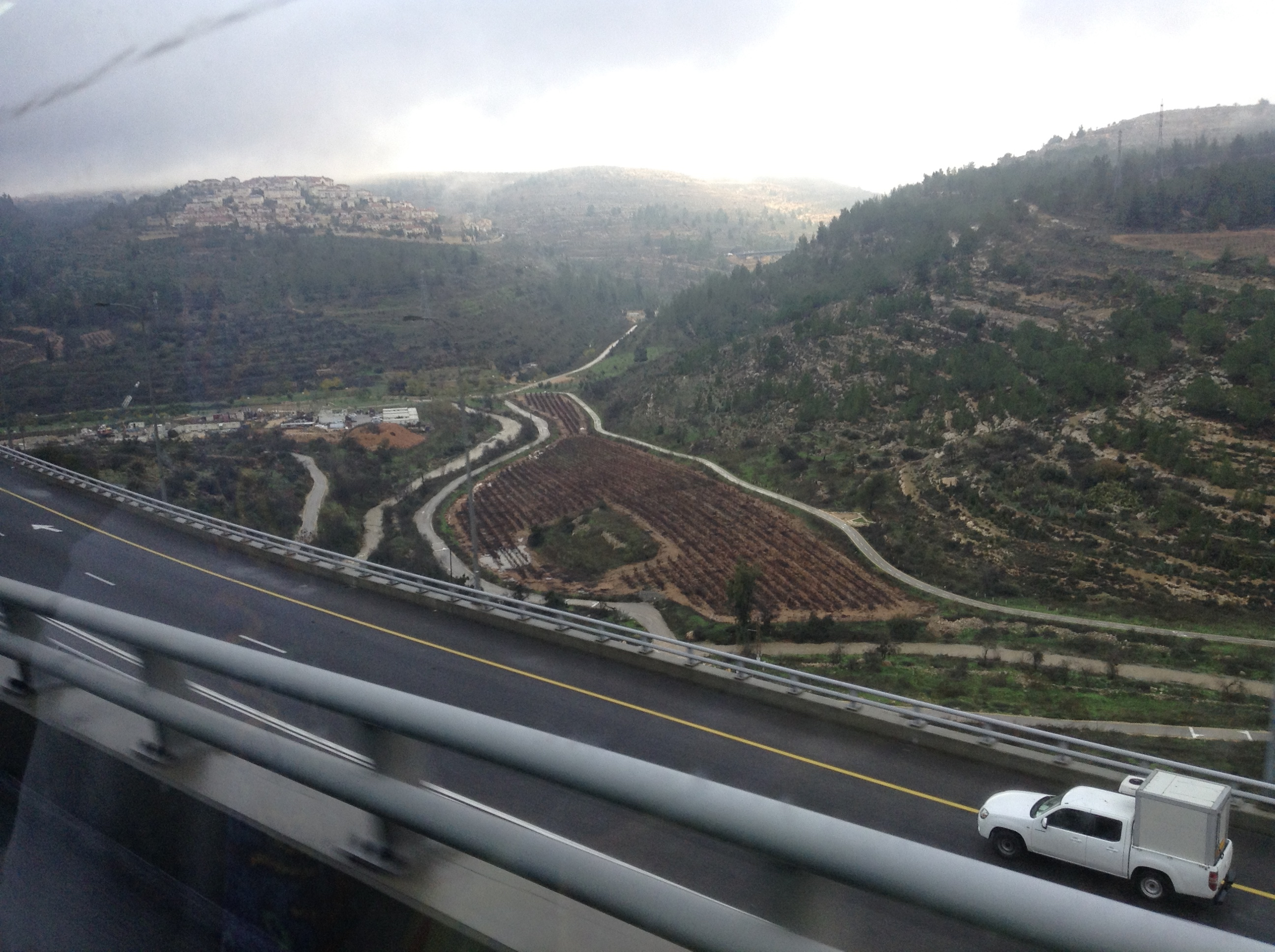
Highway 1: from Jerusalem to Tel Aviv

Israel's road network spans 18,096 kilometers (11,244 mi) of roads, of which 449 km (279 mi) are classified as freeways. The network spans the whole country.

Route 6, the Trans Israel Highway, starts just east of Haifa down to the outskirts of Beer Sheva, about 200 km (120 mi). Route 1 between Jerusalem and Tel Aviv and Route 2 between Tel Aviv and Haifa are well maintained highways. Route 90 is the longest road in Israel streaching from Metula to Eilat via the Jordan Valley and Arava.

=== Cycling ===
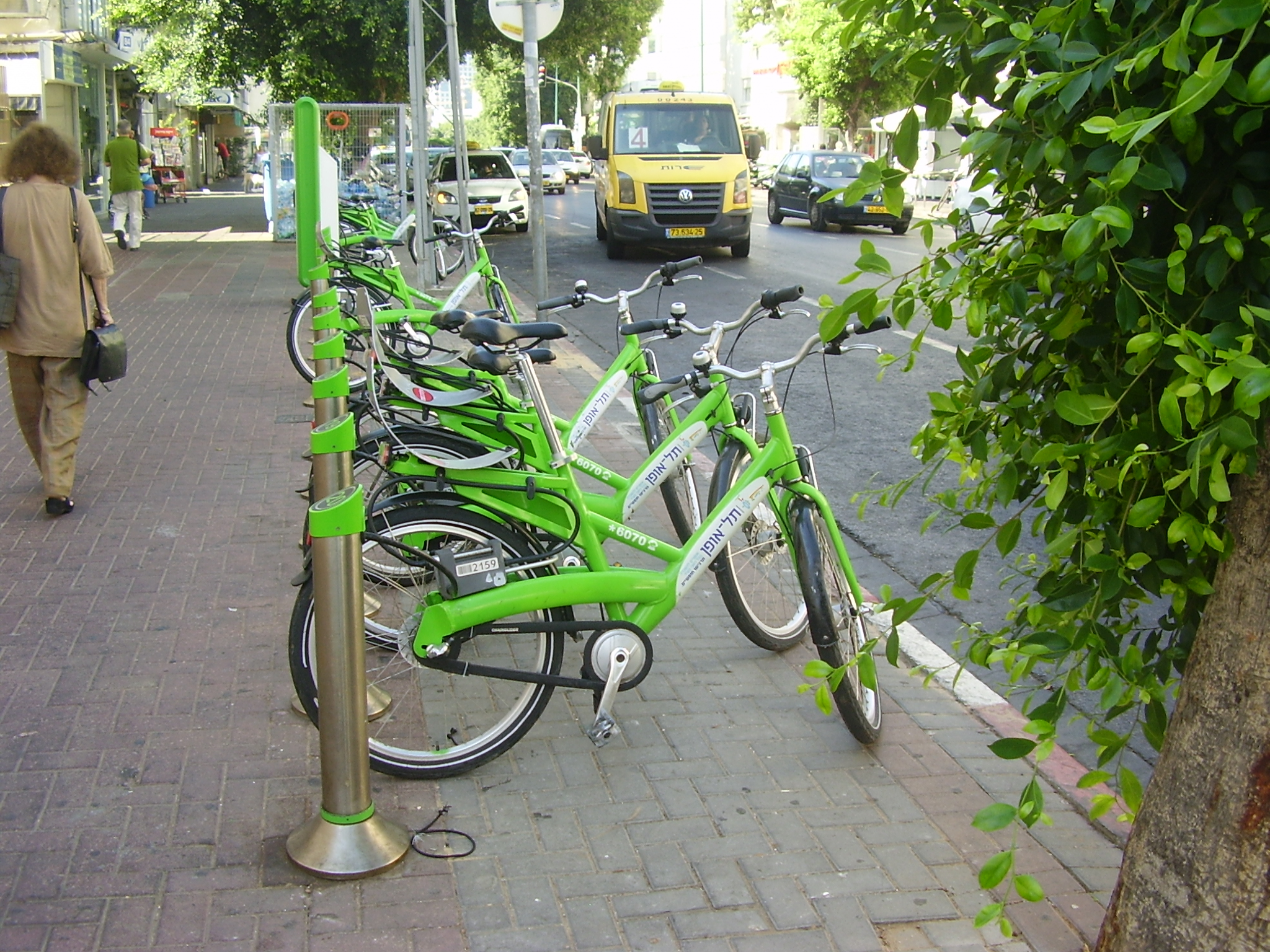
Tel-O-Fun in Tel Aviv

Tel Aviv has a growing network of bike paths, with more than over 360 kilometers (224 miles) existing or planned. In April 2011, Tel Aviv municipality launched Tel-O-Fun, a bicycle sharing system, in which 150 stations of bicycles for rent were installed within the city limits. Jerusalem has over 125 kilometers (78 miles) of cycleways, either existing or planned. Additionally, Jerusalem also has a bicycle sharing program called Jerufun.

==== National Bike Trail ====
The National Bike Trail, when completed will take riders from the southern city of Eilat to the border with Lebanon, passing through Jerusalem, Tel Aviv and several other cities. The trail will extend over 1,200 kilometers across Israel, like the Israel National Trail, from Eilat to Mount Hermon. It will be composed of 27 segments, passing through Jerusalem, Tel Aviv, and the Golan Heights.

In December 2011, the Jewish National Fund opened a 32 kilometer dual-path bike trail that passes through the western portion of the Ben Shemen Forest and continues on through the Modi’in area. In December 2014, eight sections, spanning 400 km from Mitzpe Ramon to Eilat, were open for riding across the Negev desert. As of July 2020, about 400 km have been opened, connecting Arad to Mishor Amiaz and the Sde Boker Seminary to Eilat.

==== Ofnidan (Greater Tel Aviv Cycle Network) ====
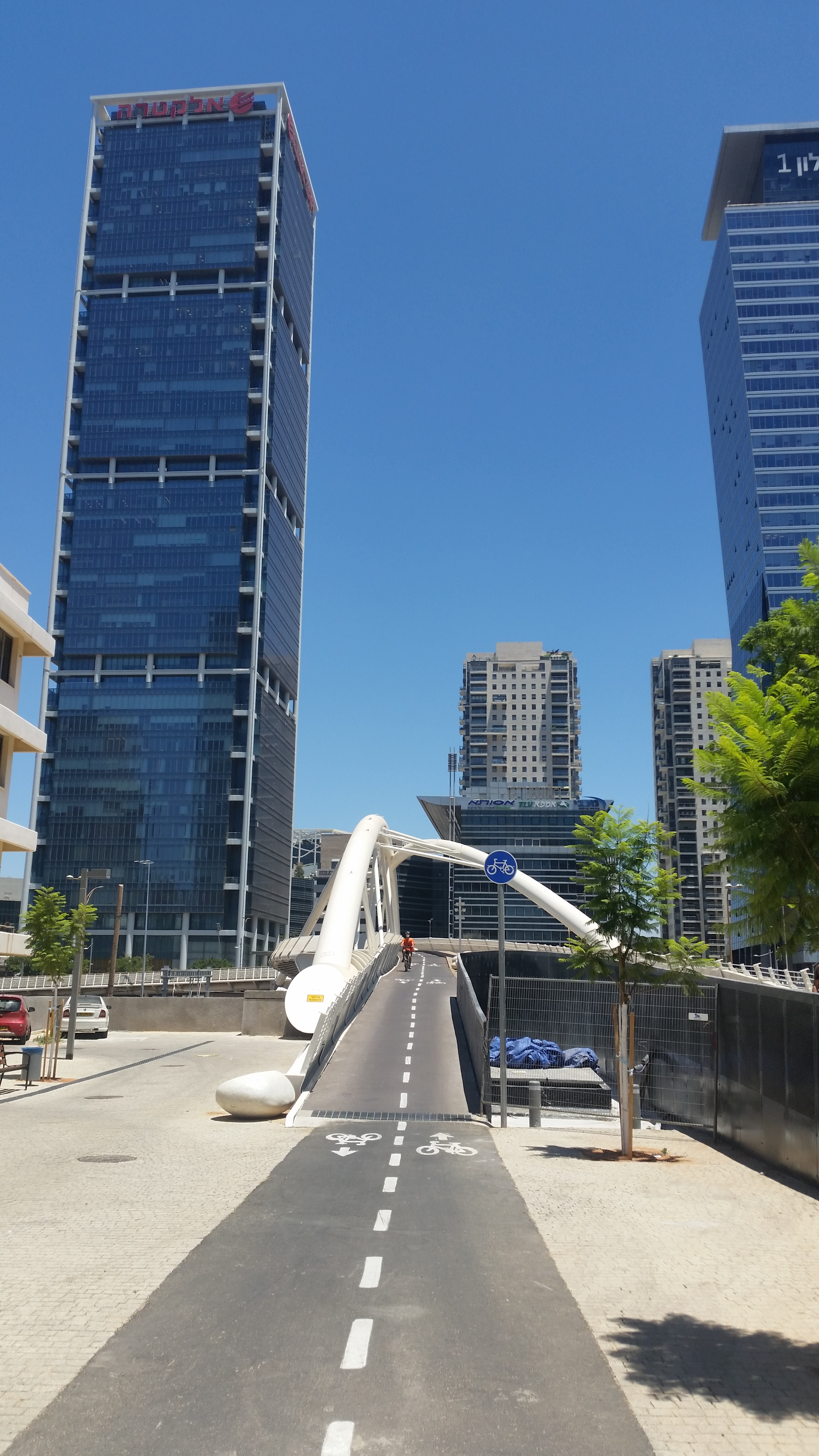
The Field Route of the Ofnidan inter-urban cycle network passes over Yehudit Bridge in Tel Aviv-Jaffa.

As of 2021, construction was underway on Ofnidan, a cycle network of seven inter-urban routes connecting the cities of the Tel Aviv Metropolitan Area, with some segments already open.

== Public transportation ==
In March 2024, Israel launched a reform intended to encourage use of public transport by decreasing prices. The reform includes a 50% discount to those who live on the periphery and not in places with a high income, to disabled. 33% discount will be given to people in the age of 18-26 so that people get used to move on public transport. Discharged soldiers and those who have completed national service will ride for free during one year. The discount will be given only for a "monthly free" arrangement and not for a ticket for a single trip. As the price of public transport in Israel is relatively low, probably more lines, bus lanes and higher frequency can cause even bigger effect.

=== Bus service ===
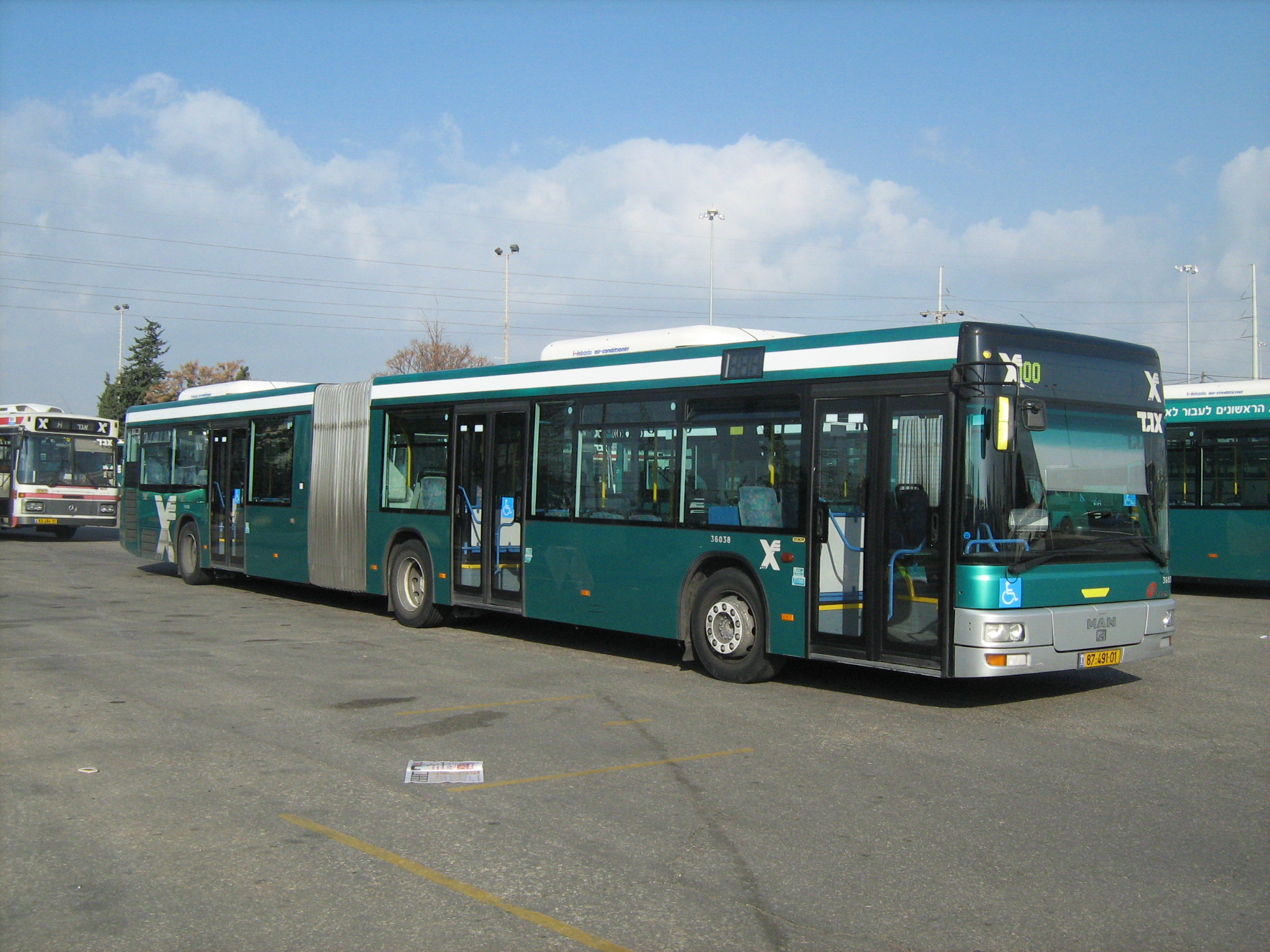
Egged articulated bus, 2000

Buses are the country's main form of public transport. In 2017, bus passenger trips totaled approximately 740 million. In 2009, 16 companies operated buses for public transport, totaling 5,939 buses and 8,470 drivers. Egged is Israel's largest bus company, and operates routes throughout the country. Bus routes in some areas are operated by smaller carriers, the largest being the Dan Bus Company, operating routes in Gush Dan. Kavim is the next largest.

Bus stations in Israel, other than standalone bus stops, come in two types: terminals (masof, pl. mesofim) and central stations (tahana merkazit). Each terminal serves a number of routes, usually over a dozen, while a central station may serve over a hundred bus routes. The largest central bus terminal in the country is the Tel Aviv Central Bus Station, which is also the second largest bus terminal in the world.

On August 5, 2010, the Ministry of Transport opened a website that contained information about public bus and train routes in the country. Previously, information was given only by the individual public transit operators.

==== Bus rapid transit ====
Israel has one bus rapid transit system in Haifa, called the Metronit, which consists of three lines connecting Haifa to its suburbs. In addition, there are BRT feeder lines to the Jerusalem Light Rail, running on dedicated bus lanes from Southern Jerusalem to the Northern Jerusalem neighborhood of Ramot crossing the light rail line at the intersection of Jaffa and King George Streets.

=== Share taxis ===
Israel also has a share taxi service (Hebrew: שירות, sherut), run by several private companies, depending on location, in addition to regular taxicab services. The shared sherut service usually appears a yellow minivans and travel along the same path as the normal buses with identical route numbers. For a slightly higher price, the shared sherut service allows passengers to both hop on and hop off anywhere along the path of travel. During peak travel, often the time of travel can be shortened as the number of passengers is significantly small compared to normal bus services. Some routes continue to travel through the night and on Shabbat providing transport needs to the population when normal buses services cease. The beginning and end of the sherut vans may differ from the central bus station and on the weekends and evenings, the routes can also be altered for some services. In 2015, share taxis carried 34.7 million passengers, 15.2 million of which were transported on city routes, with the rest going to suburban and inter-city routes.

=== Private taxis ===
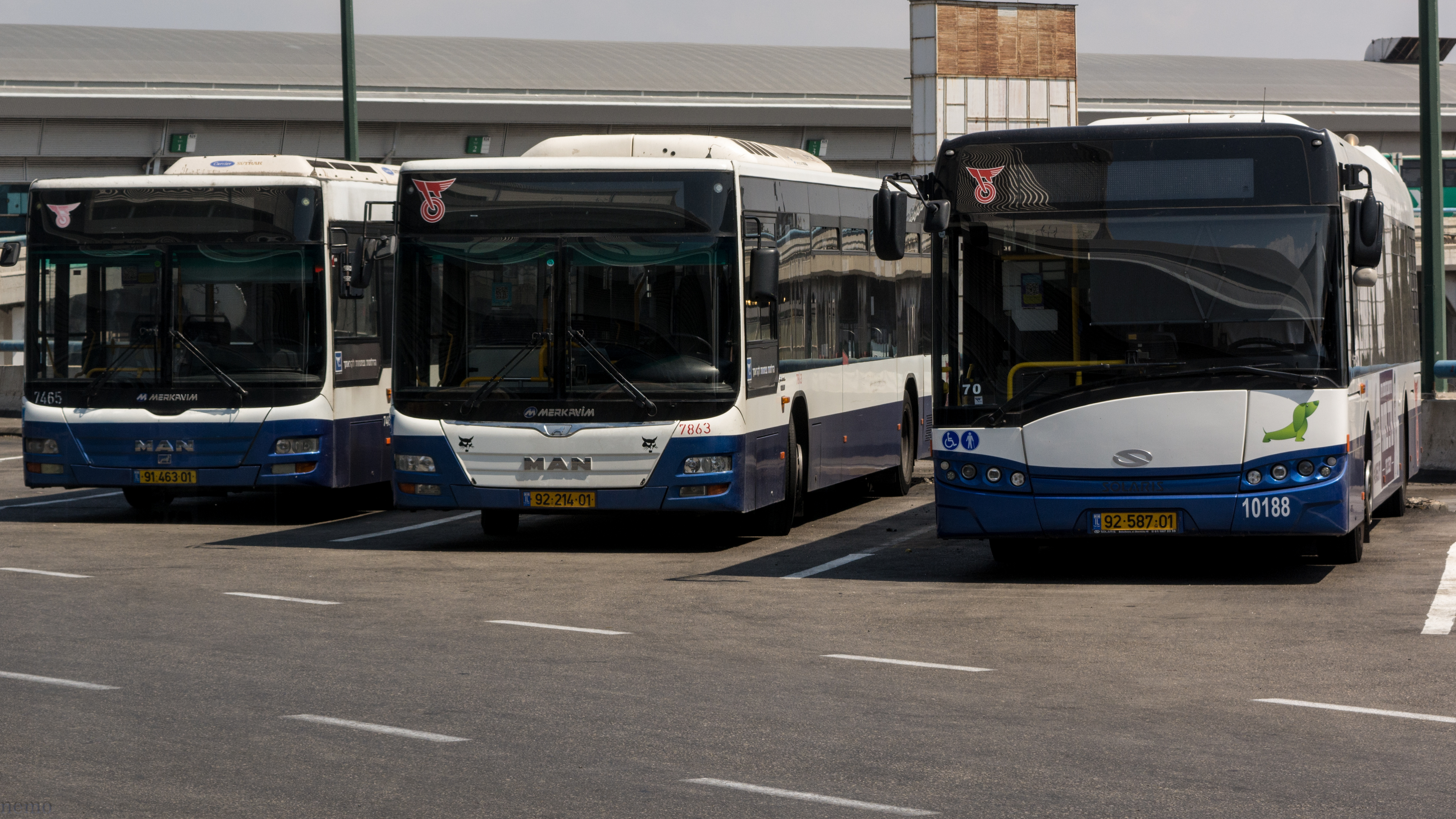
Modern Israeli buses used by the Dan Bus Company

Taxis, often called "special taxis" (Hebrew: ספיישל) in Israel, to distinguish them from share taxis, are regulated by the Ministry of Transport. Aside from individual taxi companies, Gett is the primary digital taxi hailing service in the country. In 2017, approximately 90 million rides were made using taxis.

== Railways ==
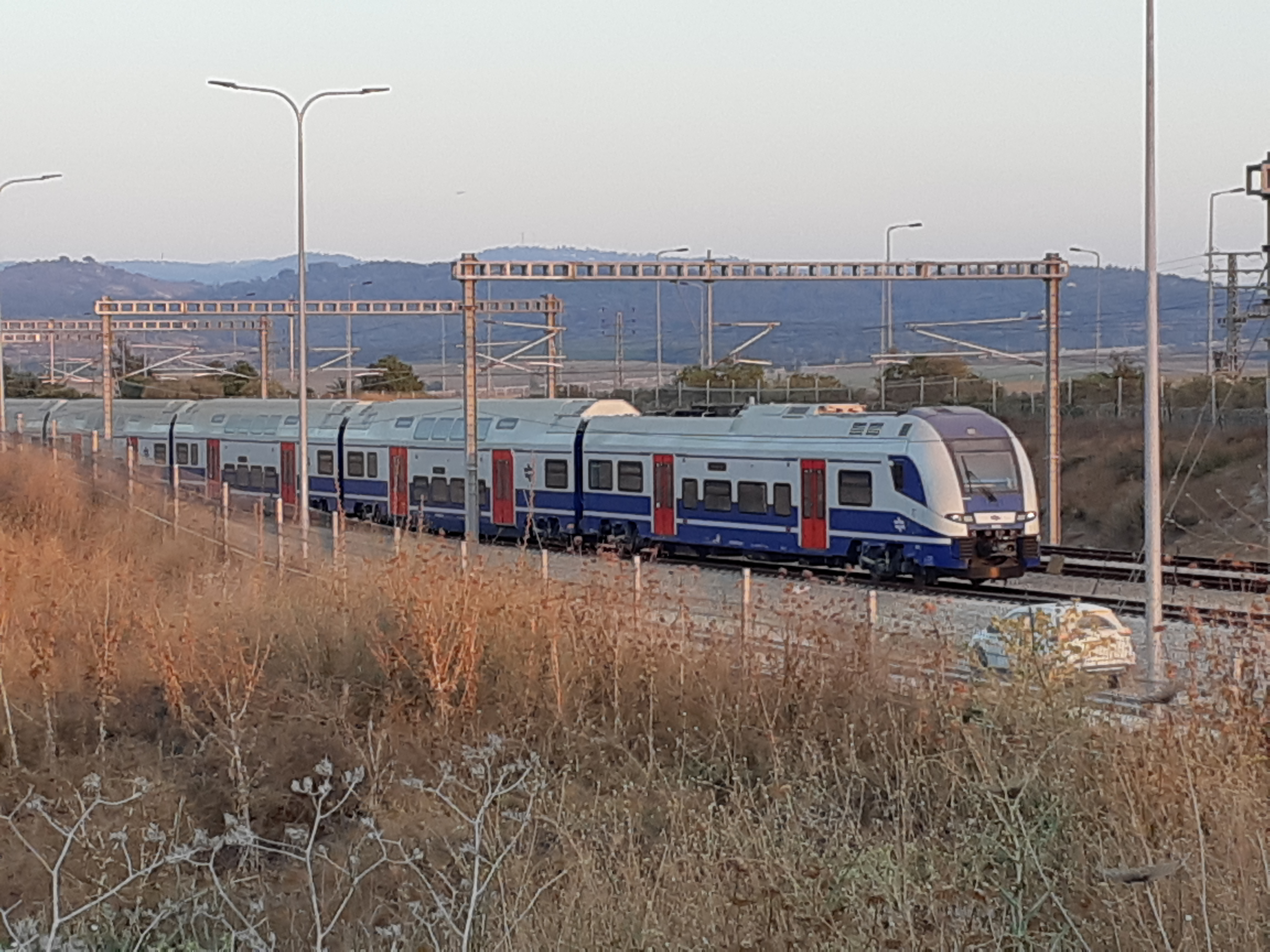
- Siemens Desiro, the main locomotive of Israel's electric train fleet.
  Total: 1,511 km 1,435 mm (4 ft 8 1/2 in) (standard gauge). In 2017 there were over 64 million passenger rides taken.

Many of Israel's railway lines were constructed before the founding of the state during Ottoman and British rule. The first line was the Jaffa–Jerusalem railway, followed by the Jezreel Valley railway, which formed part of the greater Hejaz railway. World War I brought the creation of multiple new lines out of military needs: Portions of what is now the Coastal railway were built simultaneously by the Turkish and British and later merged during the British Mandate. Southern lines were also built by the warring states—from the north by the Ottomans, and from Rafah in the west by the British.

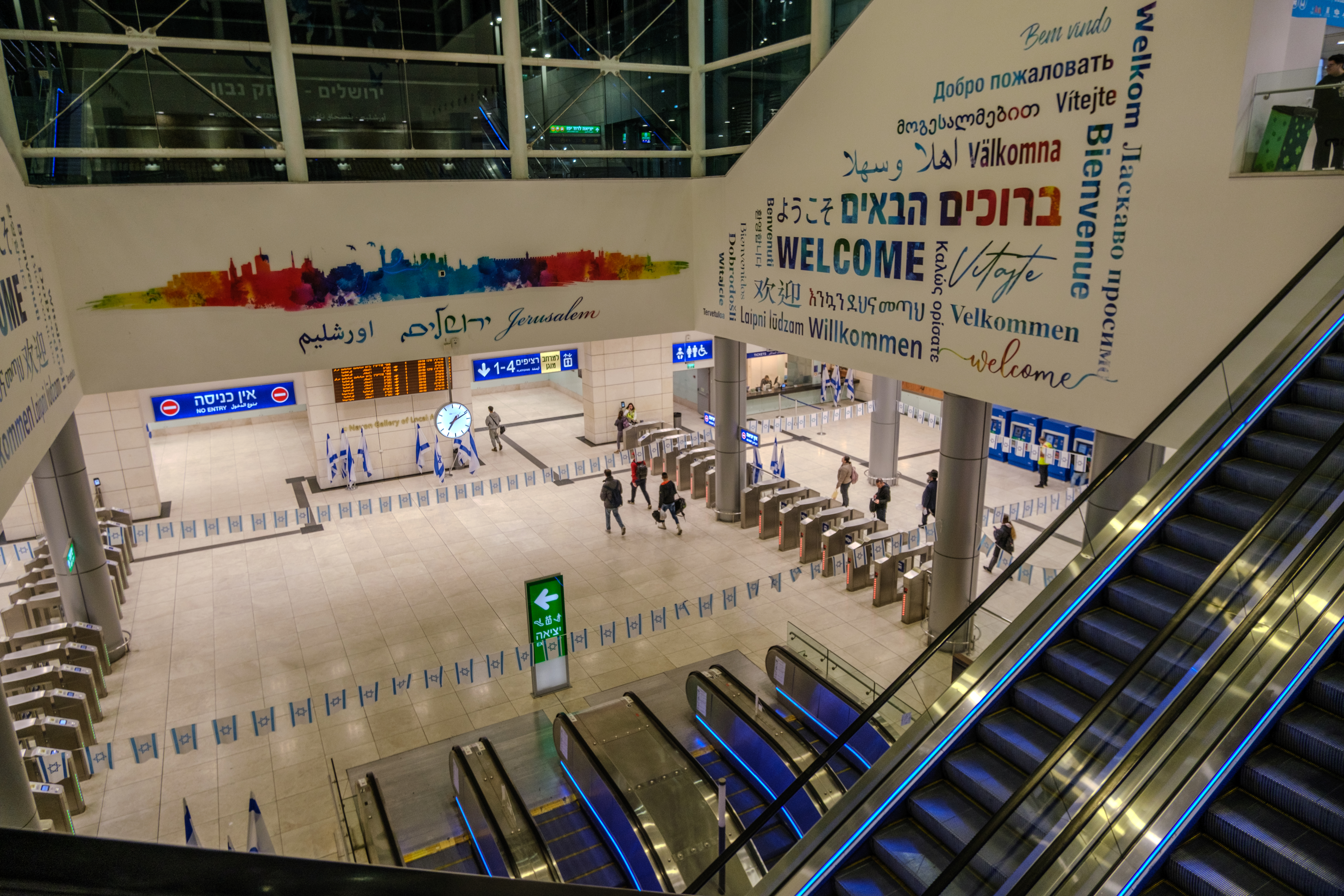
Yitzhak Navon train station, Jerusalem.

Beginning in the mid-1960s, railway development stagnated, and a number of lines (notably, the Jezreel Valley railway and most of the Eastern railway) were abandoned altogether. Development restarted in the 1990s, the opening of Tel Aviv's Ayalon railway in 1993 signaling a new era of rail development. Lines under construction in the 2000s include the high-speed railway to Jerusalem, an extension of the coastal railway directly from Tel Aviv to Ashdod through the northern Shephelah, and a line from Ashkelon to Beersheba via Sderot, Netivot and Ofakim, as well as a complete reconstruction of the line from Lod to Beersheba. These and other extensive infrastructure improvements led to a 20-fold increase in the number of passengers served by Israel Railways between 1990 and 2015.

After numerous delays due to the complexity of the project, a new line between Tel Aviv and Jerusalem opened in 2019. This line is the first electrified railway ever built in the country. Israel Railways has ordered Bombardier Traxx electric locomotives for use on this line and for other lines to be converted to electric operation. All existing and future electrified mainline railways in Israel use 25 kV 50 Hz overhead electrification.

The 2023 G20 New Delhi summit proposals included a transit corridor connecting India to the Middle East and Europe through Israel which had been part of earlier Israeli plans designed by Israel Katz, a government transit minister.

=== Light rail/Metro ===
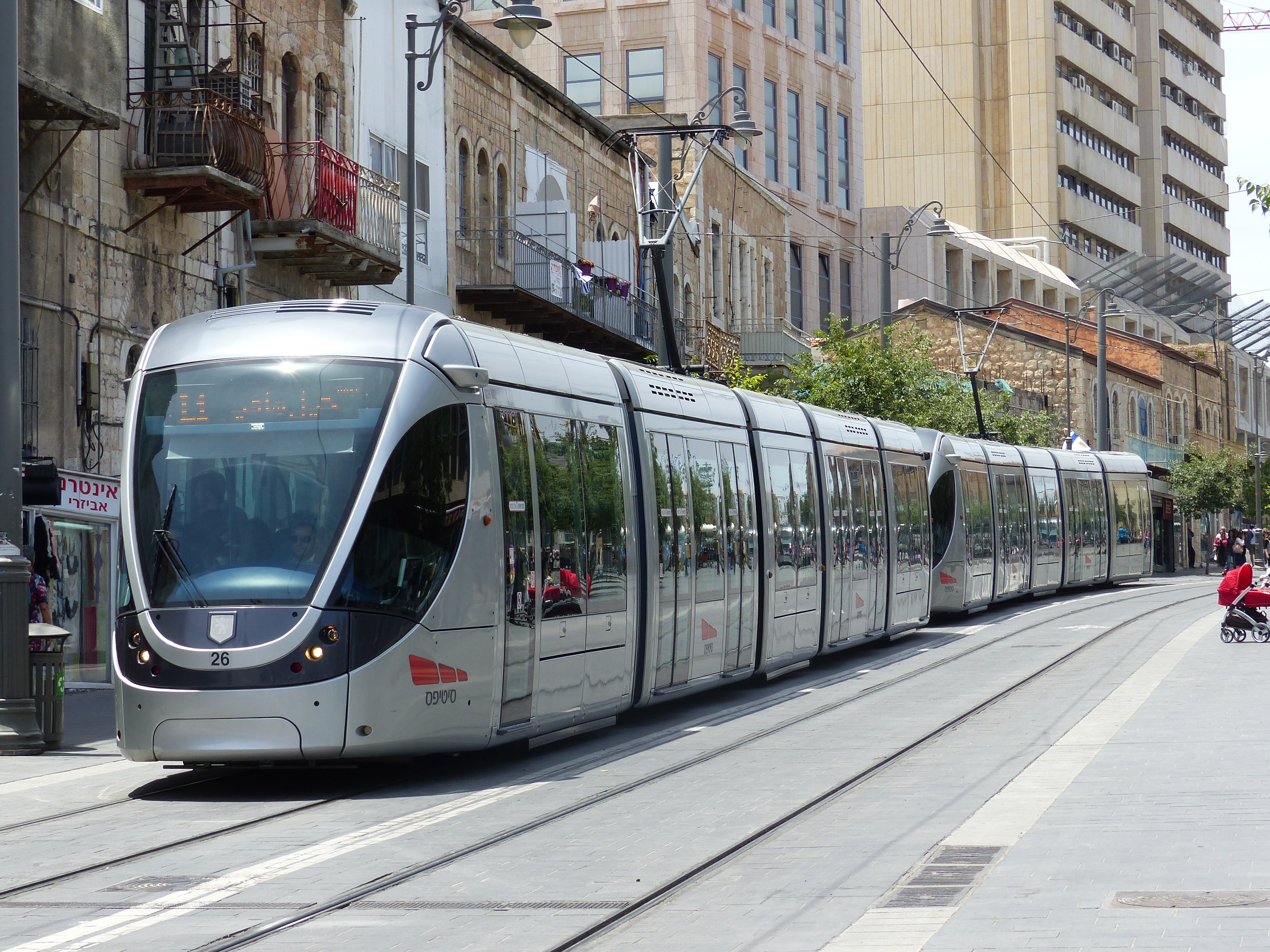
Jerusalem Light Rail Red Line tram on Jaffa Road in Jerusalem

The Jerusalem Light Rail system began operation with the Red Line, which became fully operational in December 2011, with extensions completed in February 2025 extending the line's length to 22.5 kilometres (14.0 mi). The first section of the Green Line, with 13 stations running 7 kilometres (4.3 mi) between Malha and HaTurim, opened on August 21, 2026, with connections to the Red Line at the HaTurim station and the Jerusalem central bus station / Jerusalem–Yitzhak Navon railway station.

The Tel Aviv Light Rail, serving Tel Aviv and surrounding cities, has opened its first line, the Red Line, in August 2023. A significant portion of it is underground, and two other lines are underway, the Green Line and Purple Line. A small portion of the Green Line will be underground while the Purple Line will be entirely above-ground. In addition, the Tel Aviv Metro, a subway system which will serve Tel Aviv and neighboring cities in the Gush Dan area, is planned. It will consist of three lines labelled M1, M2, and M3. The first public opening is expected to occur in 2032. A light rail system connecting Jerusalem to the nearby Gush Etzion cluster of settlements was announced in June 2026.

Haifa's Carmelit, an underground funicular railway, was Israel's first subway line. It is listed in Guinness World Records as the shortest subway system in the world, being the second smallest track network (after the Tünel in Istanbul,) but being the smallest "system" by virtue of being the only urban rail network in the city. The Haifa–Nazareth railway, a planned light rail system from Haifa to Nazareth, which will serve numerous cities and towns along the route, is planned to open in 2029. In August 2023, the construction of the Beersheba Light Rail was approved. The system will serve the city of Beersheba, as well as several towns and a military base near the city. It is expected to be completed in 2033.

=== Israel Public Transportation Statistics ===
The average amount of time people spend commuting with public transit in Israel, for example to and from work, on a weekday is 70 min. 22% of public transit riders, ride for more than 2 hours every day. The average amount of time people wait at a stop or station for public transit is 16 min, while 25% of riders wait for over 20 minutes on average every day. The average distance people usually ride in a single trip with public transit is 13.6 km, while 29.% travel for over 12 km in a single direction.

== Air transport ==
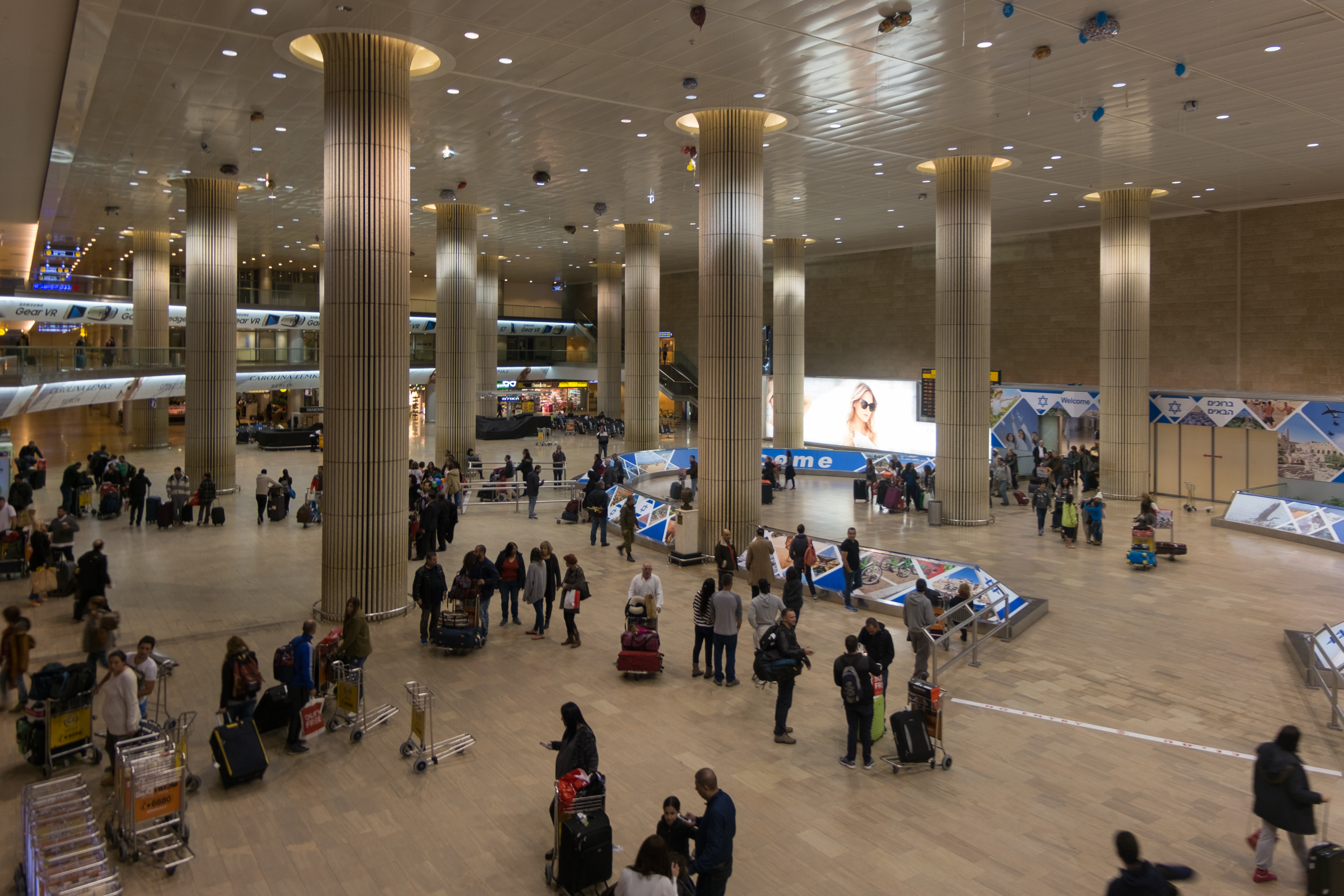
Arrivals hall at Ben Gurion International Airport's Terminal 3

Israel has 47 airports, the largest are Ben Gurion Airport (TLV) located near Tel Aviv, Ramon Airport serving Eilat and Uri Michaeli Haifa International Airport. In 2017, Ben Gurion Airport handled nearly 21 million passengers and was the busiest airport in the Eastern Mediterranean in terms of international passengers served. Non-stop flights from Israel travel to North America, Europe, Africa, the Far East, and neighboring countries in the Middle East. Scheduled domestic air service is available between Tel Aviv's Ben Gurion Airport and Haifa, Rosh Pina, the Golan Heights, and the southern city of Eilat. Some international charter and low cost flights also land at Eilat Ramon Airport. Ramon Airport opened in 2019 20 km north of Eilat replacing the existing Uvda and Eilat airports. While Uvda reverted to its use as a military airbase upon the opening of Ramon Airport, the old Eilat "city" airport was shut down with the land to be redeveloped.

According to the Israel Civil Aviation Authority, as of 2012, Israel's civil aircraft fleet consisted of 59 aircraft; 56 passenger planes, and 3 freighters. 48 of these were Boeing jets, 2 Airbus, 8 turbo-prop produced by ATR, and 1 Embraer jet. Israeli airlines ordered another 2 Embraer jets, 1 ATR airplane, 5 Airbus jets, and 10 Boeing jets, a total of 18 aircraft. It is estimated that Israeli airlines will have 65-70 craft in 2017–2018. Airlines include El Al, Sun D'Or, Arkia and Israir. In 2008, Boeing estimated that 60-80 new aircraft would be purchased by Israeli airlines over the next 20 years.

Until the 2023 Gaza war, Turkey had been Israel's largest gateway, with ten flights daily on Turkish Airlines between the two countries. In 2022, Turkey had the highest total passenger traffic to Ben Gurion Airport, at 2.5 million passengers, accounting for 13% of total traffic. By 2025, the United Arab Emirates had become one of the most frequent destinations to and from Israel, with FlyDubai running ten flights per day and additional daily service on Etihad operating up to three times per day.

In August 2026, Israir received final regulatory permission from the Federal Aviation Authority to begin service between Israel and the United States, with service to be offered between New York City and Ben Gurion Airport in Tel Aviv. Israir joins incumbent airline El Al, as well as Arkia, which began nonstop service between Israel and the US in February 2025. Service in both directions launched in September 2026.

Israel has 29 airports with paved runways, 18 unpaved landing strips, and 3 heliports.

Busiest non-stop destinations by country from Ben Gurion Airport (2017)
Rank	Country	Passengers	Top Carriers
1	Turkey	1.99 million	AtlasGlobal, Pegasus, Turkish
2	United States	1.54 million	Delta, El Al, United
3	Germany	1.42 million	Air Berlin, Arkia, EasyJet, El Al, Germania, Germanwings, Israir, Lufthansa, Ryanair, Sun D'or, TUIfly
4	France	1.24 million	Aigle Azur, Air France, Air Mediterranee, Arkia, EasyJet, El Al, Israir, Sun D'or, Transavia, XL Airways
5	Russia	1.22 million	Aeroflot, Arkia, Donavia, El Al, Israir, Kuban Airlines, Orenair, Rossiya Airlines, RusLine, Tatarstan Airlines, Transaero, Ural Airlines, UTair Aviation
6	Italy	1.18 million	Alitalia, Arkia, EasyJet, El Al, Israir, Meridiana, Mistral Air, Neos, Ryanair, Small Planet, Sun D'or, Vueling
7	United Kingdom	1.15 million	Arkia, British Airways, EasyJet, El Al, Israir, Wizz Air
8	Greece	1.15 million	Aegean, Arkia, Alitalia, El Al, Israir, Neos, Sun D'or
9	Spain	897,488	Air Europa, Arkia, El Al, Iberia, Israir, Norwegian, Sun D'or, Vueling Airlines
10	Ukraine	843,442	El Al, Sun D'or, Ukraine International, Yanair
11	Switzerland	653,496	Arkia, EasyJet, El Al, Swiss
12	Romania	694,122	Air Bucharest, Arkia, Blue Air, El Al, TAROM, Wizz Air
13	Cyprus	603,694	Aegean, Arkia, Ayit, Cobalt Air, Cyprus Airways, El Al, Israir, Ryanair, Tus Airways
14	Poland	599,632	El Al, Israir, LOT, Ryanair, Small Planet, Sun d'Or, Travel Service, Wizz Air
15	Israel (domestic)	580,191	Arkia, El Al, Israir

== Ports and harbors ==
=== Mediterranean Sea ===
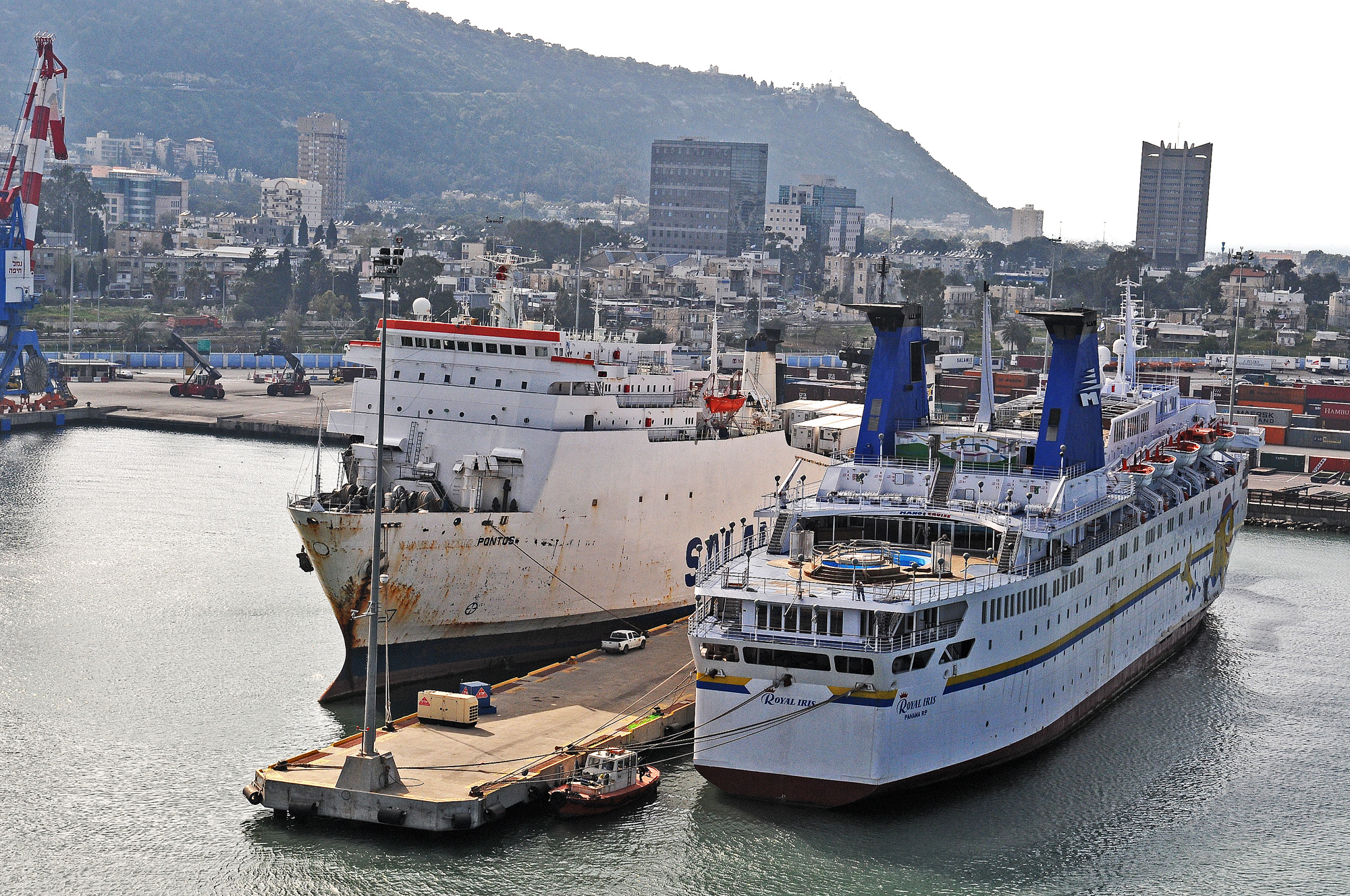
Ships in Haifa port

- Ashdod Port
- Haifa Port

=== Red Sea ===
On the Gulf of Eilat:

- Eilat Port

== Merchant marine ==
- Total: 18 ships (with a tonnage of 1,000 gross tonnage (GT) or over) totaling 716,382 GT/845,053 tonnes deadweight (DWT)
- Ships by type: Cargo ship 1, Chemical tanker 1, Container ship 16 (2006)

Many ships owned and operated by Israeli companies operate under foreign registries. Israel's Zim Integrated Shipping Services is one of the largest shipping companies in the world.

== Cable cars ==
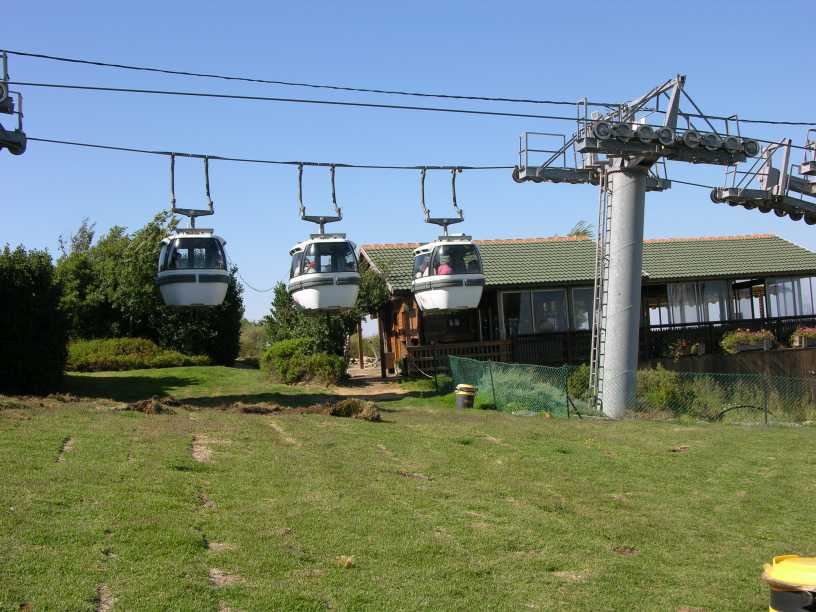
Israel's longest cable car – the Manara Cliffs cable car

There are six tourist and leisure-oriented cable car systems in Israel. These include the Rakavlit cable car in Haifa, connecting Bat Galim on the coast to the Stella Maris observation deck and monastery atop Mount Carmel, the cable car in Kiryat Shmona, linking it to Menara 400 metres (1,300 ft) above the town, the chairlifts and cable cars in the Mount Hermon ski resort in the Golan Heights, the cable car to Masada, near the Dead Sea, enabling tourists to quickly reach the mountain top site, and the cable car at the Rosh HaNikra grottoes site, going down to the chalk cliff and cavernous tunnels on the Mediterranean coast. In addition to that, the Superland amusement park near Rishon LeZion has its own cable car and a public transport-oriented cable car is being developed in Haifa—the Haifa Cable Car.

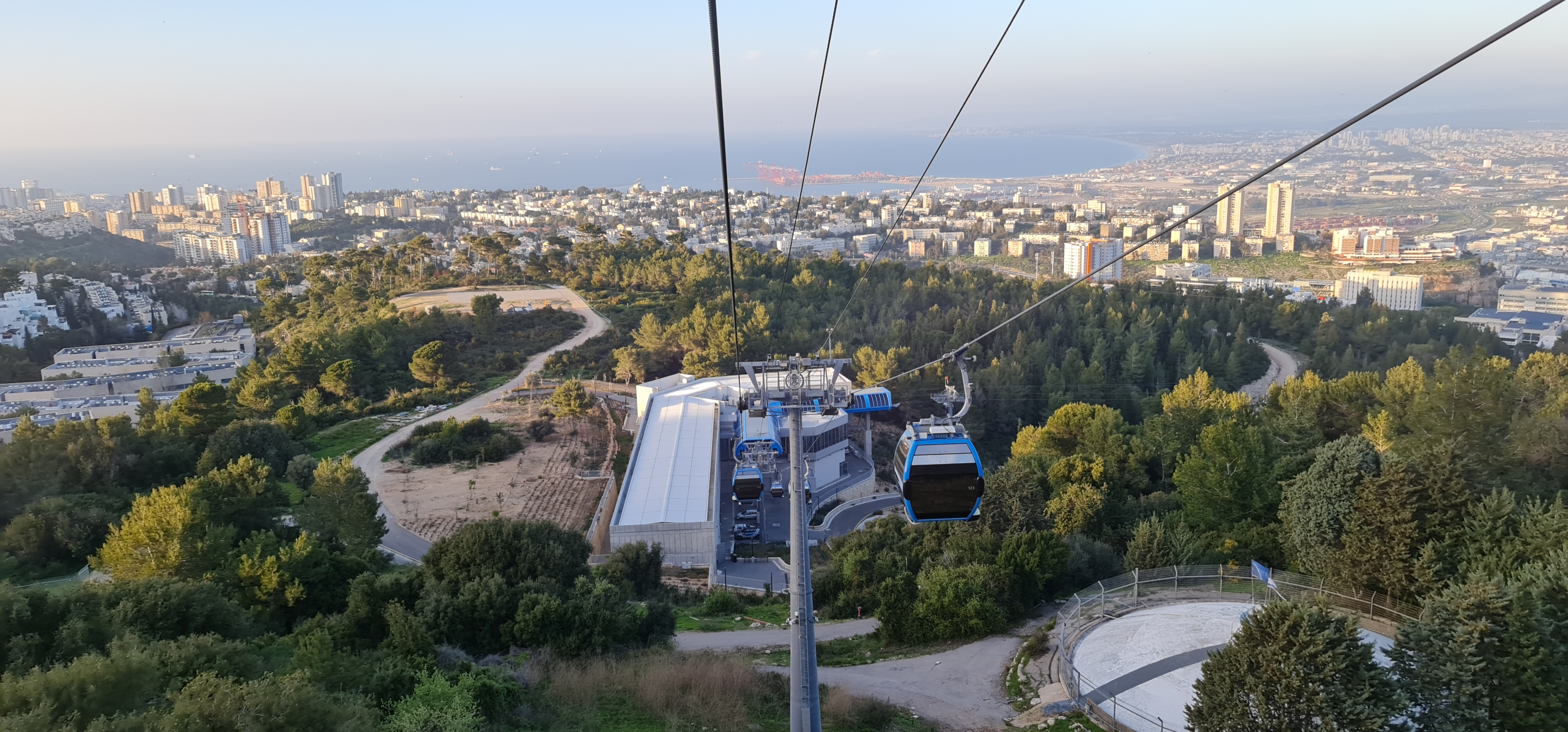
The Rakavlit cable car in Haifa

Additional future plans include a system in western Haifa, and systems in Tiberias, Ma'alot-Tarshiha, Jerusalem and Ma'ale Adumim.

== Segway ==
In 2006, the Segway scooter was approved for use on sidewalks and other pedestrian designated locations, as well as roads that have no sidewalks, obstructed sidewalks or sidewalks lacking curb cuts. The user must be over 16 years old. No license is required. The maximum allowed speed is 13 km/h (8.1 mph), enforced by electronic restriction put in place by the importer. Companies offering tours of Jerusalem use the second generation i2 model, equipped with Lean Steer Technology that facilitates ski-like steering.

== Academia ==
Currently in Israel there are a few research facilities that research the transportation field, its philosophy and impacts. The Technion - Israel institute of technology houses the fair transport lab headed by Karel Martens, which specializes in the field of transport justice. Also located at the Technion are the T-SMART Lab (Smart Transportation Systems), the Transportation Infrastructure Laboratory, the Mobility Management Research Center, and the Road Safety Research Center. Furthermore, the Technion and Bar-Ilan University jointly run the Israel Smart Transportation Research Center (ISTRC) headed by Yoram Shiftan and supported directly by the Prime Minister’s Smart Mobility Initiative and the Council for Higher Education. Furthermore, conferences on transportation are organized by Transport Today & Tomorrow - The Israeli Organization for Sustainable Transportation. Tel Aviv University houses the Shlomo Shmeltzer Institute for Smart Transportation.

== See also ==
- Plug-in electric vehicles in Israel
