= Tel-O-Fun =

Israeli bicycle sharing service

Metrofun

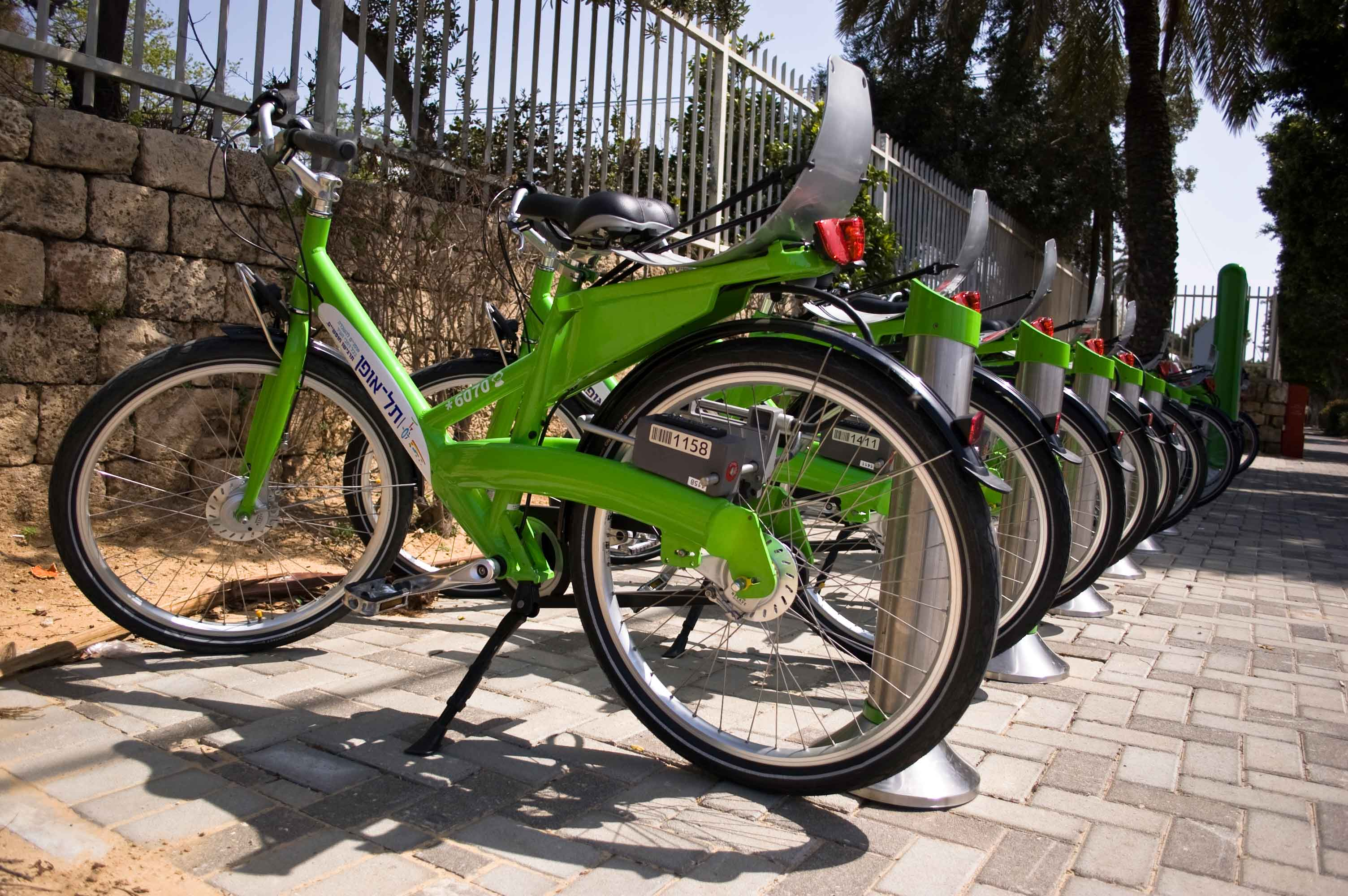

Overview
- Native name: Hebrew: מטרופאן
- Owner: Tel Aviv-Yafo Municipality
- Locale: Tel Aviv, Israel
- Transit type: Bicycle-sharing system
- Website: metrofun.co.il

Operation
- Began operation: 28 April 2011; 15 years ago

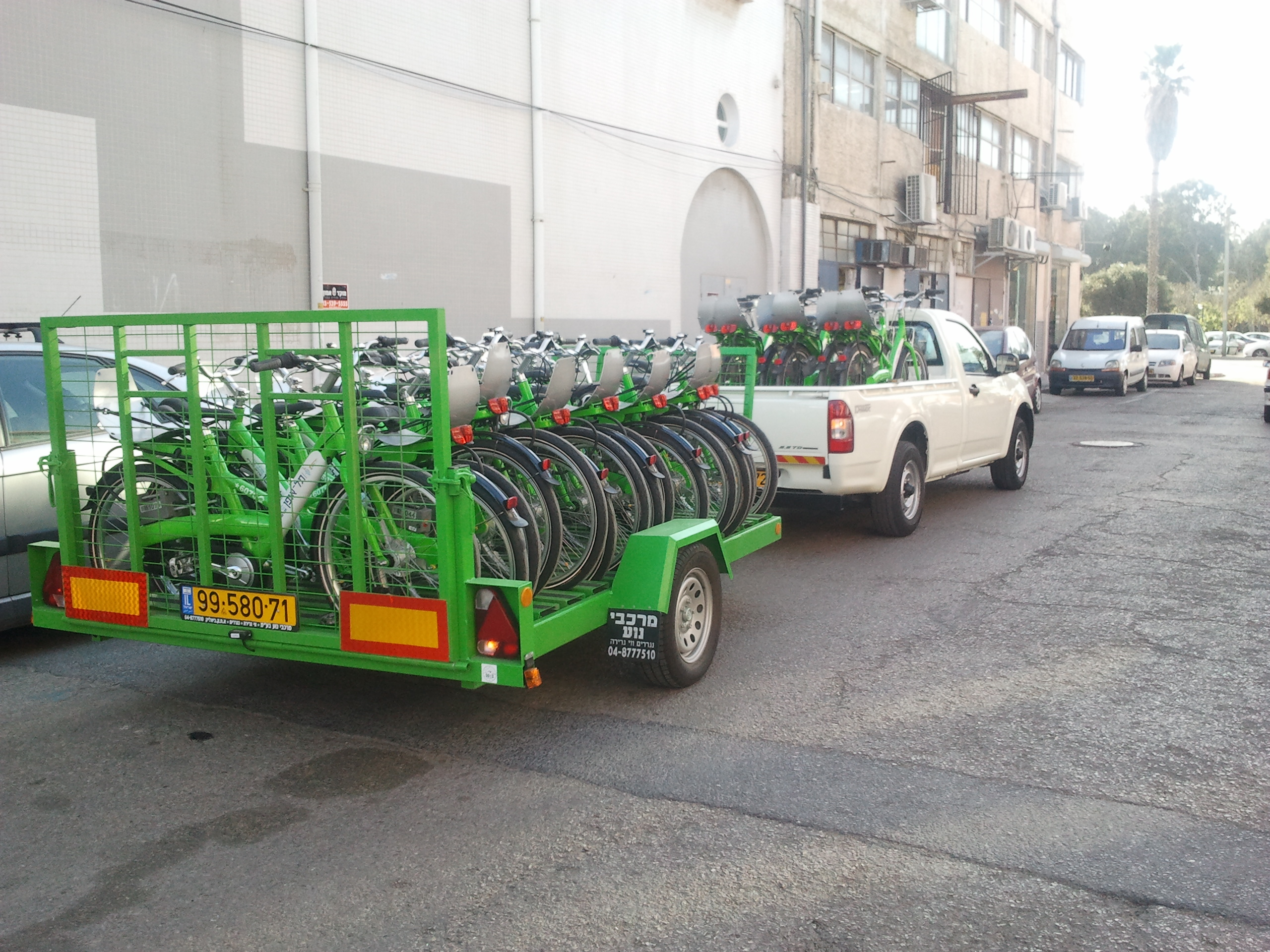
Tel-o-fun bicycles, 2011

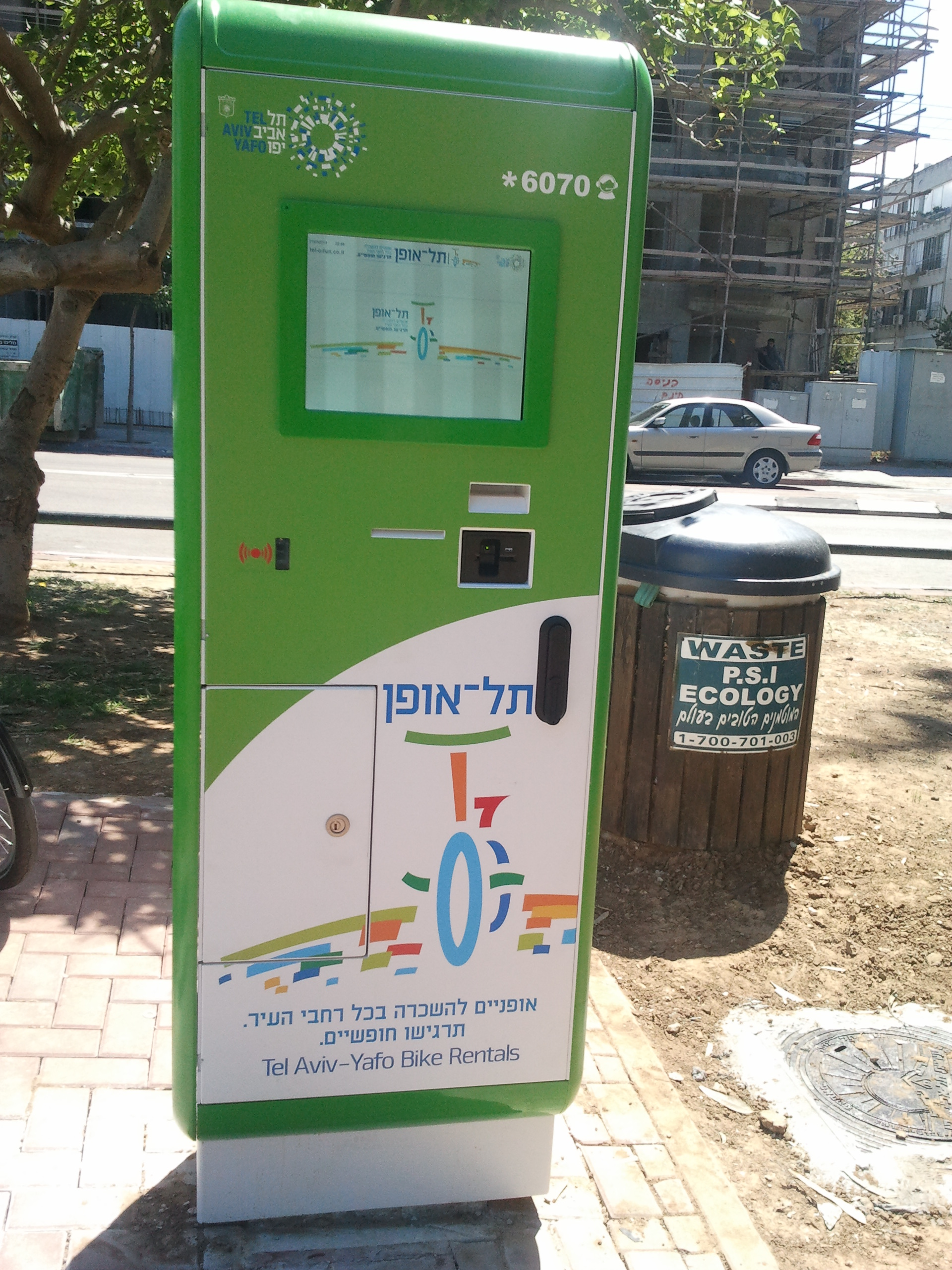
Tel-O-Fun station, 2011

Metrofun (previously: Tel-O-Fun) is an Israeli bicycle-sharing service which is provided to the city of Tel Aviv, Israel. The service's main goal is to reduce motor vehicle traffic within the city. The project also aims to reduce air pollution, create a friendly atmosphere in the city, and encourage physical activity and fitness.

== Overview ==
The service was launched on 28 April 2011 and provided over 250 bikes, available to any person over the age of 15, at 35 docking stations deployed around the city. As of May 2016, there are 200 active stations, providing more than 2,000 bicycles.

Starting August 2015 the service was extended to the neighboring towns – Ramat Gan and Givatayim, with 10 docking stations in each town.

The rental system was built in collaboration with the transport corporation Deutsche Bahn. A complex computer terminal is located in the docking stations. An associated command and control system manages the entire array. Side terminals are installed with cable stations magnetic pages connect bicycles. To prevent a shortage of availability of bikes at one station and another station load cycling, bicycle transportation crews regulate from station to station, according to a model developed at Tel Aviv University.

Access to the service was developed by Tel Aviv University. Daily, weekly and annual subscriptions are available. The daily and weekly subscriptions can be purchased at any bike station with a credit card (a card with a barcode is automatically issued by the automatic machine). An annual subscription can be purchased online on the Metrofun website or at the city hall building. A card with an electronic chip will be issued. A call center is available (*6070) on Weekdays 07:00–21:00, Fridays and eve of bank holidays 07:00–14:00. The call center will attend emergency calls 24/7.

The project is based on a deficit budget of the municipality and is not profitable. Their budget for the next ten years is about 130 million shekels (₪).

== Rates ==
The updated rates for May 2016:

Subscriptions
Subscription	Price	Comment
Daily subscriptions on weekdays	₪17	–
Daily subscriptions on weekends and bank holidays	₪23	from Friday/eve of holiday at 14:00 to Saturday/holiday evening at 19:00
Weekly subscriptions	₪70	–
Annual subscriptions	₪280	–
Annual subscriptions for residents of Tel Aviv	₪240	with a resident card or a 'Maximum Tel Aviv' credit card

For each rental
Cumulative time	Price
Up to 30 minutes	Free
Up to 60 minutes	₪6
Up to 90 minutes	₪12
Up to 150 minutes	₪32
Up to 210 minutes	₪72
Up to 270 minutes	₪152
Each extra hour above 270 minutes, up to 24h	₪100

- The time count will reset after returning the bike to a station for, at least, 10 minutes.
- If less than 10 minutes pass between the time a bike is returned to the parking stations and bike re-rental by the same subscriber, the rental time will be calculated cumulatively.

Fines
Fine	Rate
For a full 24h	₪1200
Each extra 24h (full or partial)	₪800
Maximum fine	₪4500

== Bicycles ==
Metrofun bikes are equipped with locks and sling backs, and they contain electronic components that allow for their identification by bike stations, track ride, bike mode (lighting, brakes, dynamo), and collecting statistical data on bicycle use. The bicycles are manufactured by the company Panther (Panther Werke) in Germany, and have three gears. They're adapted for women and men alike.

Bike parts are not easily broken (the seat is irremovable), and they are not standard sizes. Metrofun's bicycle parts don't fit standard bicycles, to prevent the theft and reselling of bicycles and bicycle parts.

== See also ==
- Bicycle-sharing system
