= Expo Tel Aviv =

Convention center in Tel Aviv, Israel

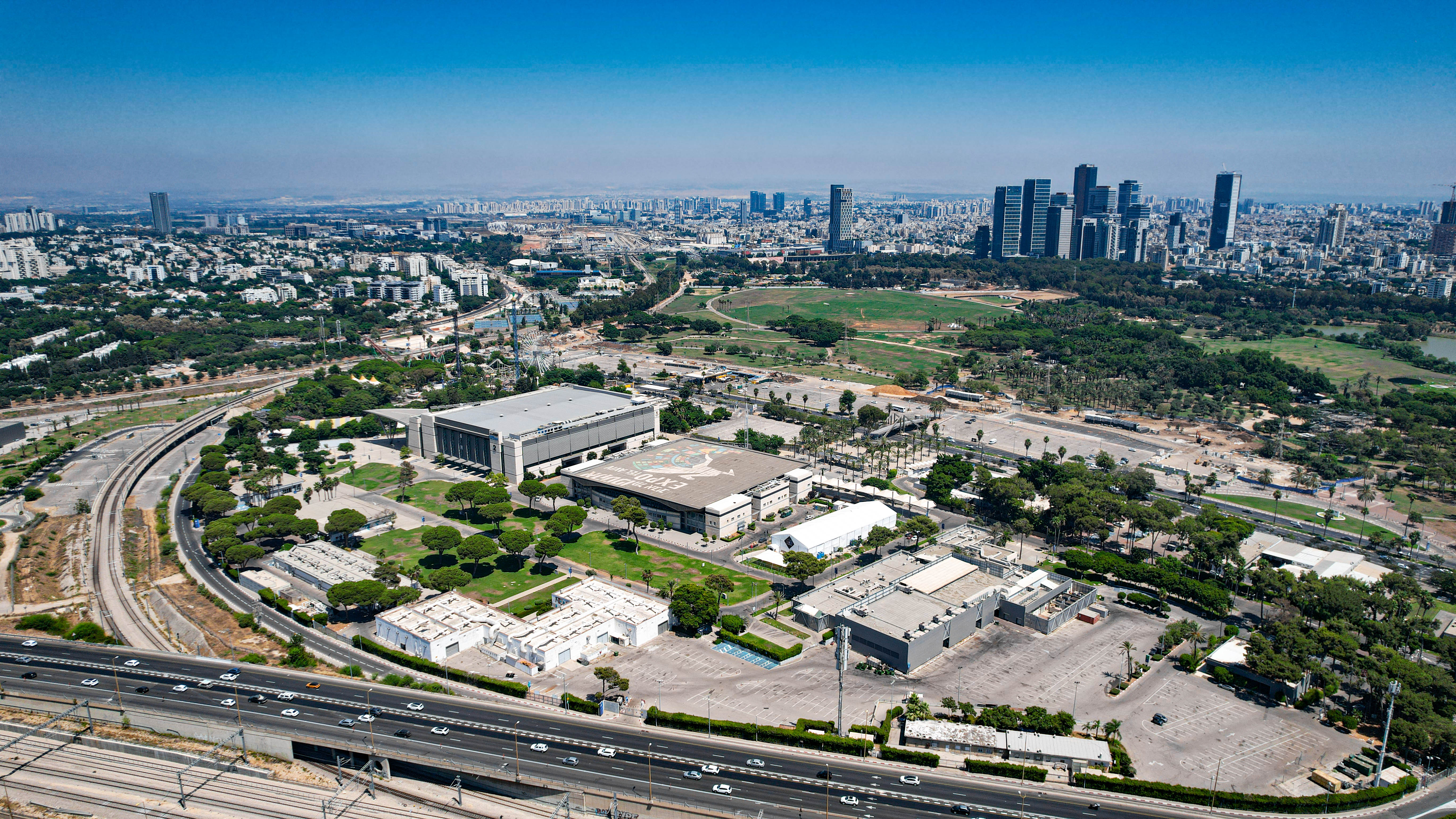
- Interactive map of Expo Tel Aviv
- Former names: Israel Trade Fairs and Convention Center; Tel Aviv Convention Center (2014–2018)
- Address: 101 Rokach Boulevard
- Location: Tel Aviv, Israel
- Coordinates: 32°06′19″N 34°48′31″E
- Owner: Tel Aviv-Yafo Municipality
- Operator: The Israel Trade Fairs & Convention Center Ltd.
- Capacity: 5,990 (Pavilion 1); 9,200 (Pavilion 2); 3,420 (Pavilion 10)
- Public transit: Tel Aviv University railway station

Construction
- Opened: 1983 (Congress Hall); 2003 (Pavilion 1); 2015 (Pavilion 2)
- Renovated: 2011 (Congress Hall; renamed Pavilion 10)
- Demolished: 2010 (round pavilion)
- Architect: Aryeh Elhanani

Website
- expotelaviv.co.il/en

Expo Tel Aviv (formerly the Israel Trade Fairs and Convention Center (Hebrew: מרכז הירידים והקונגרסים בישראל) and later the Tel Aviv Convention Center (Hebrew: מרכז הירידים - תל אביב), commonly referred to as Ganei HaTaarucha (Hebrew: גני התערוכה, lit. "Exhibition Gardens") or the Tel Aviv Fairgrounds, is a fairground complex on Rokach Boulevard in northern Tel Aviv, Israel, used as a venue for concerts, exhibitions, trade fairs, and conferences.

Established in 1932 as Yerid HaMizrach at the site of the Levant Fair, near the Tel Aviv Port, the fairgrounds moved to their present location at 101 Rokach Boulevard (near the Yarkon Park and Tel Aviv University) in 1959. The site is directly accessible from the Ayalon Highway, Tel Aviv's main transportation artery, as well as from the Tel Aviv University railway station.

Expo Tel Aviv hosts up to 2.5 million visitors and between 45 and 60 major events annually. The fairground has ten halls and pavilions and a large outdoor space including an amusement park known as the Luna Park. Nearby is the Drive-in Arena which was built on the grounds of what was once Israel's only drive-in theater.

The venue was renamed to Expo Tel Aviv ahead of hosting the Eurovision Song Contest 2019. It also hosted the 2022 Tel Aviv Open, the first major tennis tournament held in Israel since 1996.

== History ==
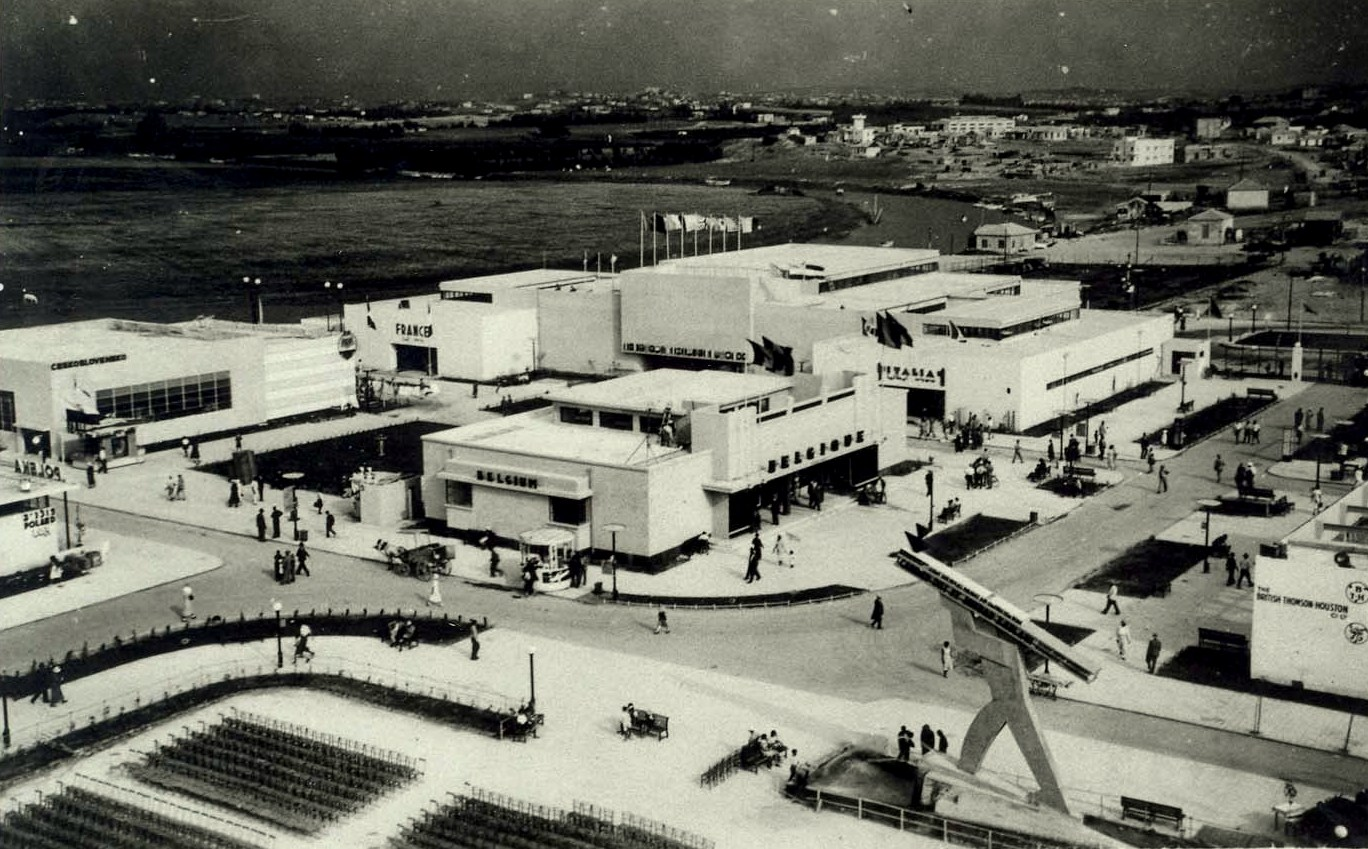
Aerial view of the Levant Fair in the 1930s

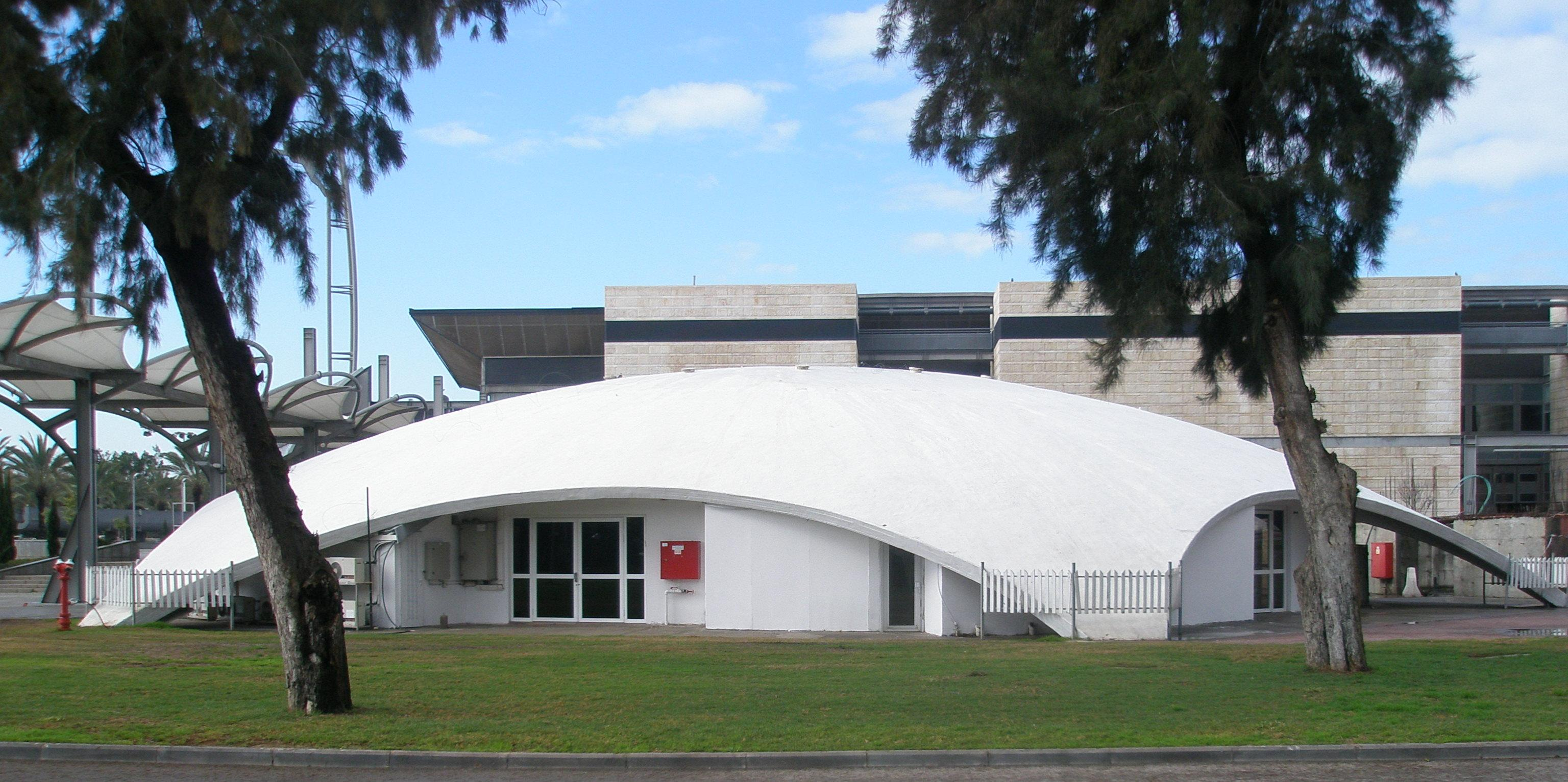
Tel Aviv round pavilion, built in 1959 and demolished in 2010

The Levant Fair was an international fair site next to the Tel Aviv Port established in 1933 to showcase the accomplishments of the pre-state Jewish community in the sphere of industry. After the success of the first fair, permanent structures were built on a plot of land at the northern end of Dizengoff street on the banks of the Yarkon River.

Fairs were held in 1934 and 1936 with pavilions and halls constructed for the participating countries. The chief architect was Aryeh Elhanani. A flying camel became the official logo. Richard Kauffmann planned the pavilion layout. Other leading architects were Arieh Sharon and Joseph Neufeld. The pavilions were designed in the International Style.

In 1959, the fairgrounds were moved to their present location on Rokach Boulevard, and the new site was inaugurated with an exhibition marking Tel Aviv's 50th Jubilee. In 1983, the Congress Hall opened within the fairgrounds, and at the end of 2003 the "Pavilion No. 1" was opened.

In 2010, the "round pavilion" in the fairground was demolished. In its place began the construction of a new 10,000-seat congress and convention center called "Bitan 2" (Pavilion 2), which was inaugurated in January 2015. The new pavilion hosted the 2018 European Judo Championships from 26 to 28 April.

== Entertainment ==
In recent years, the center has been used for many musical concerts and shows.

On 13 September 2018, the European Broadcasting Union (EBU) and the Israeli Public Broadcasting Corporation (IPBC/Kan) announced that the center would host the Eurovision Song Contest 2019. The semi-finals were held on 14 and 16 May 2019, with the final taking place on 18 May 2019. Kan expected Pavilion 2 to have room for up to 9,000 attendees.

== See also ==
- Culture of Israel
- Tourism in Israel
- Art in Tel Aviv

Preceded by Altice Arena; Lisbon	Eurovision Song Contest; Venue; 2019	Succeeded by Ahoy Arena; Rotterdam
