= Arieh Sharon =

Israeli architect (1900–1984)

Arieh Sharon אריה שרון
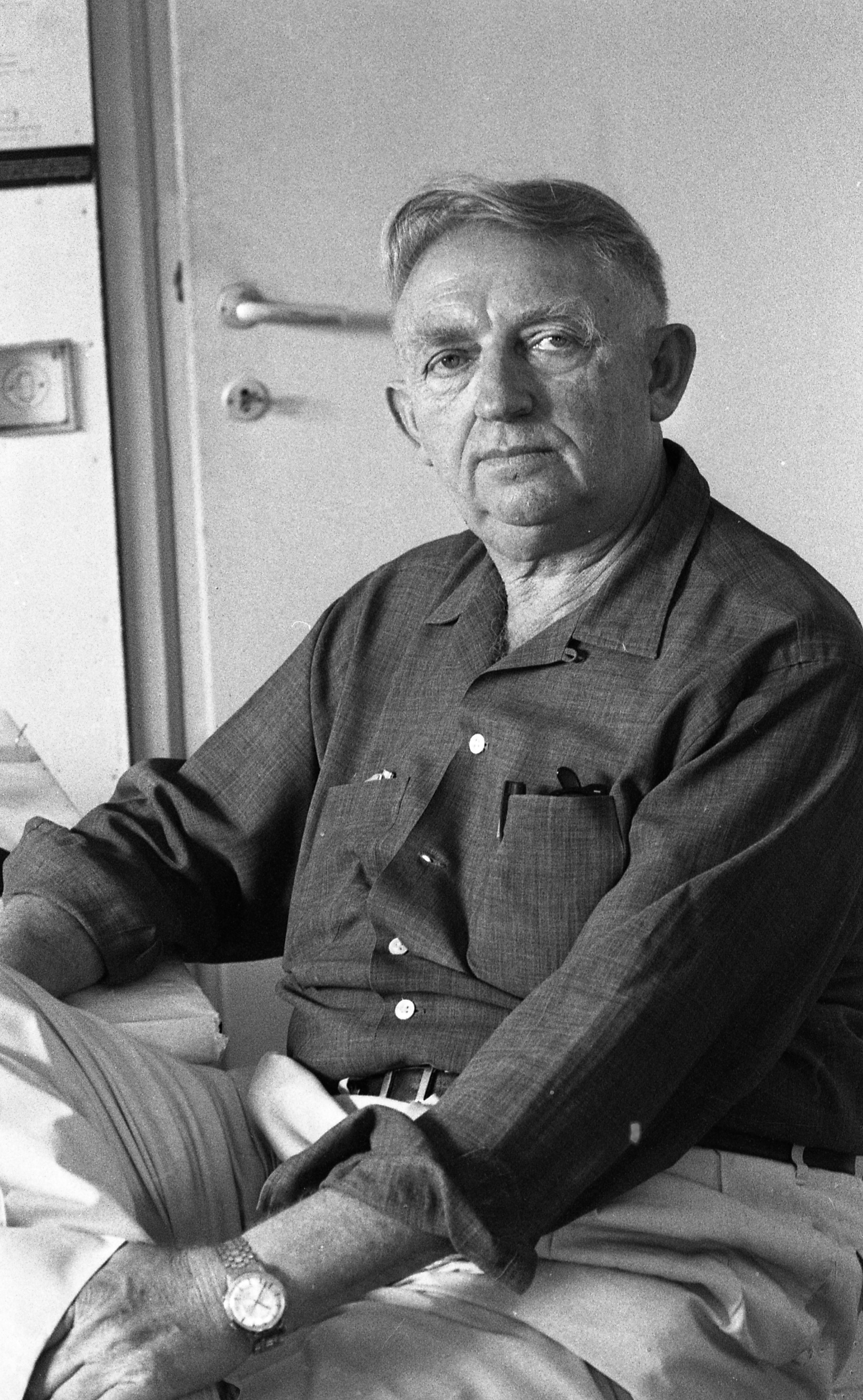
- Born: Ludwig Kurzmann; May 28, 1900; Jarosław, Austria-Hungary (now Poland)
- Died: July 24, 1984 (aged 84); Paris, France
- Occupation: Architect
- Spouses: Gunta Stölzl (m. 1929; div. 1936) Haya Sankowsky (m. 1936)
- Awards: Israel Prize for Architecture, 1962
- Buildings: Ichilov Hospital – now Tel Aviv Sourasky Medical Center; Beilinson Hospital – now Rabin Medical Center

Arieh Sharon (Hebrew: אריה שרון; May 28, 1900 – July 24, 1984) was an Israeli architect and winner of the Israel Prize for Architecture in 1962. Sharon was a critical contributor to the early architecture in Israel and the leader of the first master plan of the young state, reporting to then Prime Minister, David Ben-Gurion. Sharon studied at the Bauhaus in Dessau under Walter Gropius and Hannes Meyer and on his return to Israel (then Mandatory Palestine) in 1931, started building in the International Style, better known locally as the Bauhaus style of Tel Aviv. Sharon built private houses, cinemas and in 1937 his first hospital, a field in which he specialized in his later career, planning and constructing many of the country's largest medical centers.

During the 1947–1949 Palestine war in 1948, Sharon was appointed head of the Government Planning Department, whose main challenge was where to settle the waves of immigrants who were arriving in the country, and in 1954 returned to his private architectural office. In the sixties, he expanded his activities abroad and during the next two decades built the Ife University campus in Nigeria. As the city of Tel Aviv rose from three and four storey buildings to multi-storey buildings in the sixties and seventies, Sharon's office designed many high-rise buildings for the government and for public institutions such as university buildings and hospitals. He is the father of Eldar Sharon and the grandfather of Arad Sharon.

== Early life ==
Ludwig Kurzmann (later Arieh Sharon) was born in Jaroslau, Galicia, Austria-Hungary, (now Jaroslaw, Poland) in 1900. After graduating from high school in 1918, he studied at the German Technical University in Brno. In 1920 he emigrated to Palestine with a group of young pioneers belonging to the “Shomer Hatzair” movement and worked for one year with a farmer in Zikhron Ya'akov. He joined Kvutzat Gan Shmuel in 1921 which evolved into a kibbutz, working as a beekeeper, and later, taking charge of planning and constructing simple farm buildings, cow-sheds and dwelling units. In 1926, on one year's leave from the kibbutz, he traveled to Germany to extend his knowledge in building and architecture.

== Architectural studies ==
Sharon spent a month in Berlin and arrived at the Bauhaus in Dessau, where he was admitted to the preliminary course – the famous Bauhaus Vorkurs – by Walter Gropius, the founder of the Bauhaus. Sharon studied under Josef Albers, whose teachings were based on letting the student experience different materials, trying them out, and making experiments. Sharon's exercises – turning two-dimensional sheets of paper and metal into three-dimensional shapes – were shown in a Bauhaus exhibition. In April 1927, Hannes Meyer was appointed head of the building department and Sharon was to be greatly influenced by his teacher's pragmatical and functional approach to architecture.

In 1928 he and two other Bauhäusler, Gunta Stölzl, head of the Bauhaus weaving workshop and the student Peer Bücking visited the Vkhutemas Academy in Moscow, an avant garde art school with similar aims as the Bauhaus. In 1929, some time after their return, Sharon and Stölzl were married and their daughter Yael was born.

He received his Bauhaus diploma in 1929 and was immediately put in charge of Hannes Meyer's architectural office in Berlin, to supervise the construction of the Bundesschule des Allgemeinen Deutschen Gewerkschaftsbundes (ADGB Trade Union School) in Bernau bei Berlin. Next to the Bauhaus school buildings in Dessau, it was the second largest project ever undertaken by the Bauhaus. The building underwent an extensive restoration which was completed in 2007. It is a protected building and since 2017 has been part of the UNESCO World Heritage Site complex "The Bauhaus and its Sites in Weimar, Dessau, and Bernau".

== Tel Aviv in the 1930s ==
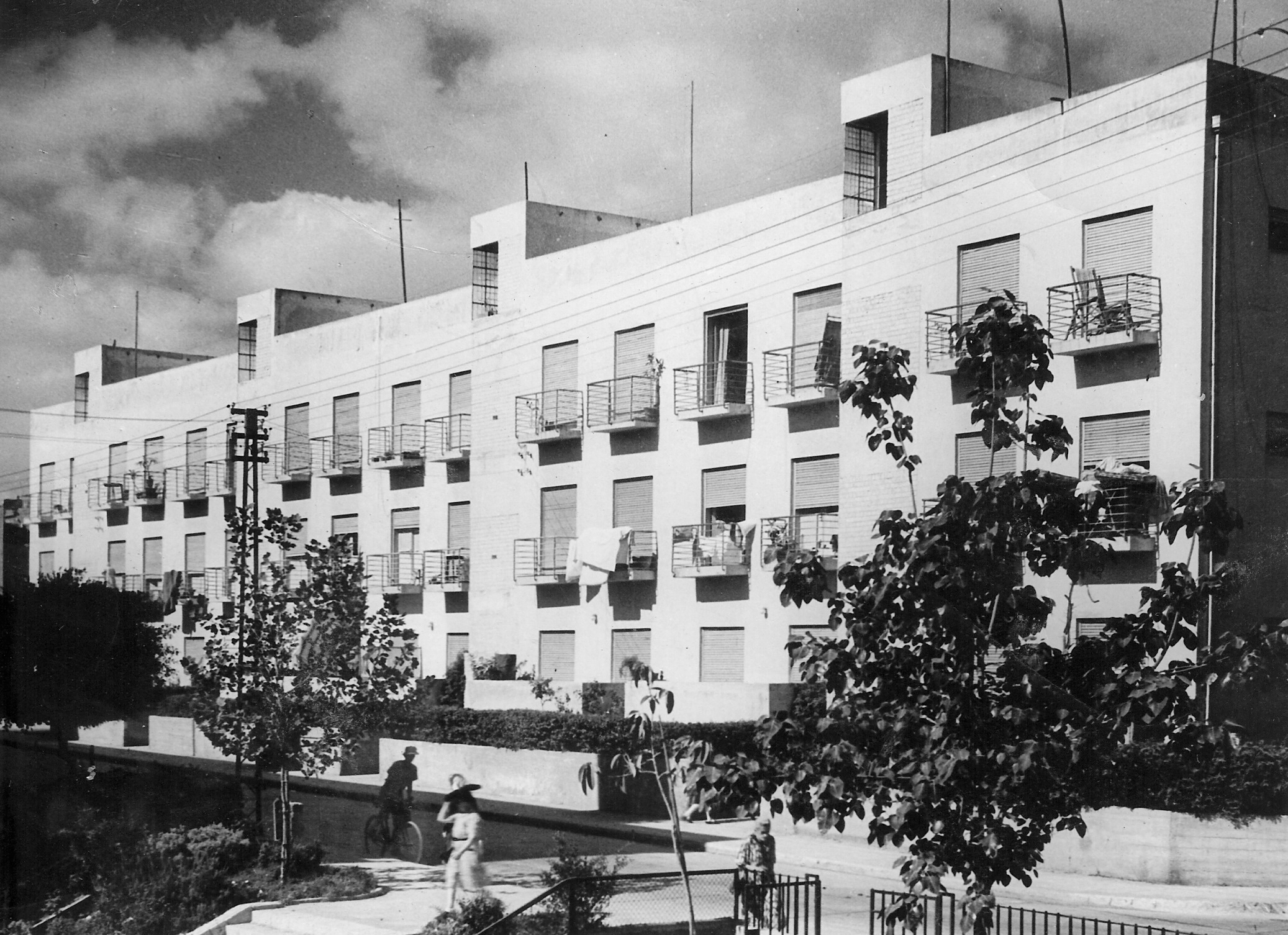
Workers' Homes, "Meonot Ovdim", 1936

In 1931, Sharon returned to Palestine and opened his architectural office in Tel Aviv, while Gunta Stölzl emigrated to Switzerland with their daughter, Yael. In 1936 the two divorced.

Sharon's first commission in Tel Aviv was the construction of four pavilions for the Histadrut (General Federation of Labour) exhibit at the Levant Fair in 1932. These pavilions, for which he had won first prize in an architectural competition, were composed of modular wooden elements, progressively growing in height and length, covered by jute. There followed a series of buildings in the so-called international style which would help define the city's architecture as the "White City." In addition he built residential cooperative housing estates, private houses, the central administrative seat of the Histadrut in Tel Aviv, and in 1936 his first hospital for 60 beds, near Tel Aviv.

Sharon's housing estates, known as Meonot Ovdim in Hebrew, were built around large garden patios in the center, a continuous group layout, a public space for the residents, while communal services, such as a kindergarten, laundry, shops, and synagogue were placed on the ground-floor.

A distinctive feature of Tel Aviv's townscape are the pilotis on which most of the apartment buildings in the residential quarters are raised. This feature was achieved on the part of several avant-garde architects in the early thirties in a fierce struggle against the existing municipal bylaws. The spacious voids between the pillars created a shaded streetscape, added to the natural ventilation during the hot summer days and connected the pavements with the green areas.

== Kibbutz planning in the 1940s ==
During the Second World War, building activities in the big towns all but stopped, due to the lack of fundamental building materials such as concrete and iron. Sharon began building simple structures in the kibbutzim, above all community buildings and schools, which were constructed from local materials, like sand, bricks and limestone. The dining hall in a kibbutz forms the center of the community, where in addition to its primary function, the members used to meet on social occasions, cinema or theatre performances, or political meetings. The school communities were built for 200–300 children of several kibbutzim, where the youngsters aged 12–18 lived, studied and worked together. Their layout was, in fact, that of a micro-kibbutz.

Sharon's main activity, however, was directed towards planning in the kibbutzim. He designed a great number of outline plans for existing collective settlements and their extensions as well as general layouts for new agricultural settlements, and school communities.

Other activities included a series of lectures at the Technion in Haifa, covering subjects such as:

- Early settlement types in the country
- The cooperative moshavim
- The kvutza which later developed into the kibbutz
- Physical layout of the various types of settlement
- Social and economic structures and
- Work organisation, education and cultural activities in the kibbutz

== Urban planning ==
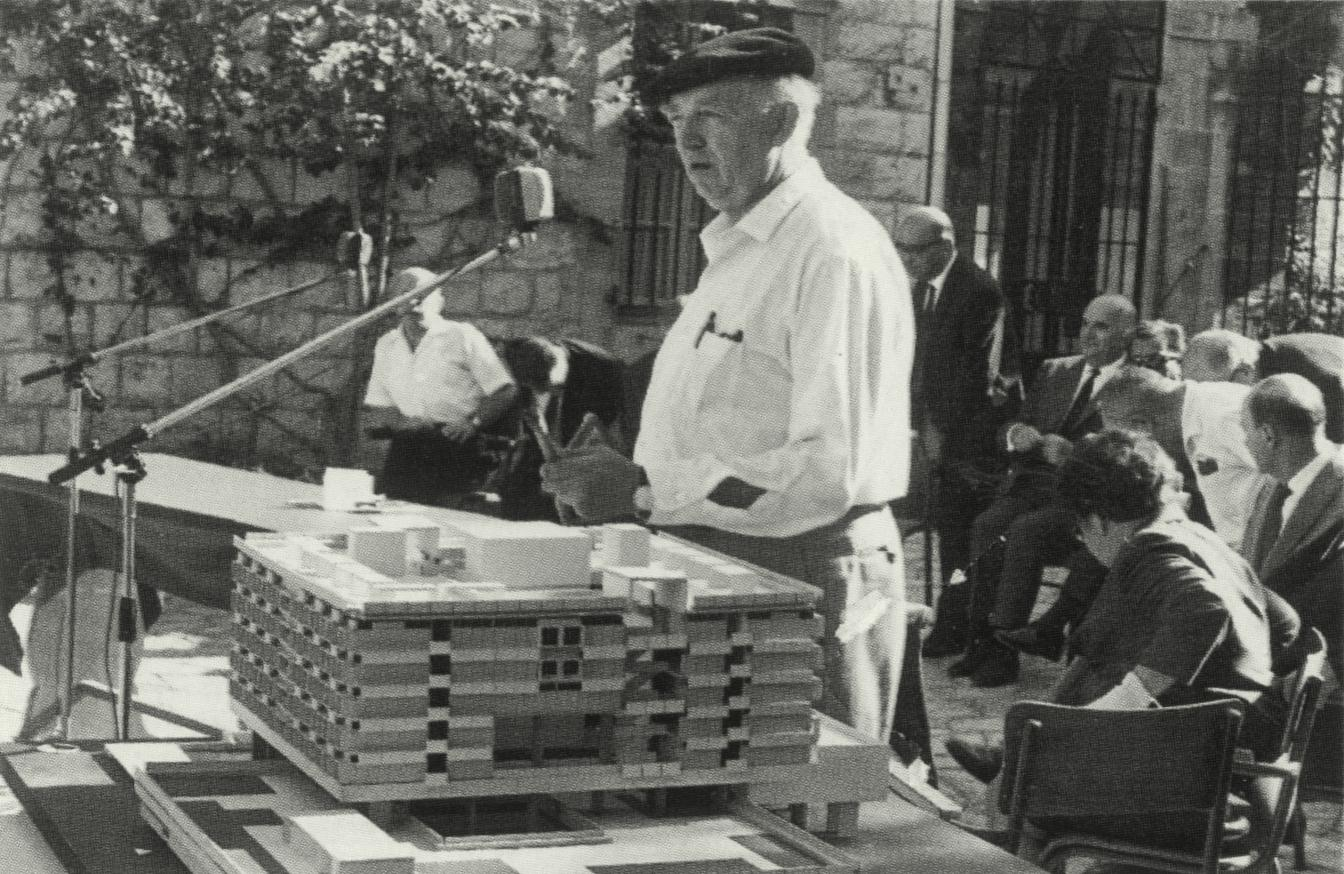
Arieh Sharon with mock-up of Rambam Hospital, Haifa, 1966

When the State was created in 1948 the overwhelming majority of the population was concentrated in a narrow coastal strip. One of the main tasks of the newly established Government Planning Department, headed by Sharon and directly responsible to the Prime Minister's Office under David Ben-Gurion, was to find solutions for the great waves of immigrants who entered Israel after the declaration of Independence. The team consisted of 180 urban planners, architects, engineers and economists. They set up a National Outline Plan, dividing the country into planning regions in accordance with economic resources, geographic features, communication factors and historical background. The regional structure would be completed by the development of a regional urban center – a medium-sized town. Thus the plan provided for the establishment of 20 new towns, dispersed all over the country and established guidelines for industrial estates to be located close to the new towns. Sharon's plan led to the creation of development towns for example: Beit She'an, Kiryat Gat, and Upper Nazareth. Agricultural regions were planned expanding into the southern Negev desert. A national water plan was set up that would carry water from the surplus areas in the north to the dry, water-poor areas in the south. And a network of National Parks was devised, spreading all over the country, exploiting the existing landscape features, nature reserves and historical sites. At the end of 1953, Sharon was invited by the United Nations to serve as a planning expert in a Seminar on Housing and Community Improvement, held in New Delhi, and afterwards to Burma and Japan.

== Private practice ==
Sharon returned to his private practice in 1954, and set up a partnership with the architect Benjamin Idelson. From 1965 onwards he worked together with his son, Eldar Sharon, until his death in 1984.

=== 1954–1964: Arieh Sharon, Benjamin Idelson, Architects, Tel Aviv ===
New Beilinson General Hospital

Selected buildings:

- 1950/56 New Beilinson General Hospital, Petah Tikva, for 500 beds
- 1952/54 Ministry of Defense, Buildings 21 and 22, HaKirya, Tel Aviv
- 1954/58 Ichilov Municipal Hospital, Tel Aviv, for 300 beds
- 1954/58 Forum of the Technion Haifa, incl. Secretariat, Library and Churchill Auditorium (competition, 1st prize)
- 1954/55 Terraced Housing, Nazareth, for new immigrants
- 1955/62 Regional Hospital, Beersheba (Israel Prize for Architecture)
- 1958/60 Wingate Institute for Physical Culture
- 1958 Israel Pavilion at World Expo Brussels with architect Aryeh Elhanani
- 1959/61 Yad Vashem Memorial, The Hall of Remembrance, Jerusalem with architect Aryeh Elhanani
- 1959/60 Workers’ Bank headquarters, Tel Aviv
- 1959/61 Yakin Pektin Factory, Petah Tikva
- 1961 First Masterplan for the University of Ife, Nigeria
- 1961/65 Jewish Agency headquarters, Tel Aviv (competition, 1st prize)
- 1962/73 Yakin Tower, Tel Aviv
- 1963/65 Sick Fund headquarters, Labor Federation, Tel Aviv
- 1963/65 Ife University Nigeria, Humanities with AMY Ltd.
- 1964 Ife University Nigeria, Halls of Residence with AMY Ltd

=== 1965–1984: Arieh Sharon, Eldar Sharon, Architects, Tel Aviv ===
Convalescent Home - "Kinarot", Tiberias

Selected buildings:

- 1965/71 Convalescent Home 'Kinarot', Tiberias
- 1965/72 Rambam Hospital, Haifa, for 600 beds
- 1965-68 Agricultural Cooperatives headquarters, Tel Aviv
- 1966/76 Wolfson General Hospital, Holon, Tel Aviv, competition, 1st prize
- 1966 Tel Aviv Medical Center, addition to Ichilov Hospital
- 1966/68 Memorial Museum, Kibbutz Yad Mordechai
- 1966/70 Geha Mental Hospital, Petah Tikva, for 170 beds
- 1967 Israel Pavilion Expo 67 Montreal (built by Ze'ev Vered)
- 1967/70 Ife University, Nigeria, Library with AMY Ltd.
- 1967/69 Housing estates in Beersheba and Nazareth
- 1967/72 Medical School, Tel Aviv University
- 1968/72 University of Ife Nigeria, Institute of Education and Sectetariat, with AMY Ltd
- 1968/70 Masterplan for the Old City of Jerusalem and its environs. With Arch. David A. Brutzkus
- 1968 The Ben Gurion Research Center, Midreshet Ben-Gurion
- 1969/74 Bank of Israel, Jerusalem (competition, 1st prize)
- 1970/73 America House, Tel Aviv with architect M. Tintner
- 1972-76 Ife University Nigeria, Oduduwa Hall with AMY Ltd.
- 1972/76 Soroka Medical Center, Beersheba, extensions and new wards block, 1200 beds
- 1972/82 Tel Aviv Medical Center, extension of existing municipal hospital to 1000 beds
- 1973/76 Gilo Neighbourhood, Jerusalem
- 1975/85 Assaf Harofe Hospital near Tel Aviv, Masterplan and Nurses’ School, O.P.D. Clinics, Maternity and Pediatrics, and medical facilities
- 1980 Old Age Home 'Gil HaZahav', Tel Aviv

== Critical acclaim ==
In Kibbutz + Bauhaus: An Architect's Way in a New Land, Bruno Zevi wrote:

Sharon as a man, - as pioneer and citizen, as an artist: could one risk separating such aspects or levels of a single, overflowing personality? Of course, here the architect is privileged; behind his forms, however, one cannot fail to grasp the human, spiritual and social aspirations of a people. This is partially true of all architects, because their work is always involved in a collective context; but for none, or perhaps only for very few others, is it evident in the same degree. In fact, Sharon could have been a driving force in the old-new land's adventure, even without being a leader and an architect; or could have been simply a key-figure in the profession, as he was after the 1948 War of Independence in Ben Gurion's technical office, and later as president of the Association of Engineers and Architects; or, again, he could have been strictly an artist in his own right. The inner meaning of his architecture derives from these pendular alternatives, from the joyful refusal to select one of them, reducing the range of his vital tentacles.

== Honors and professional membership ==
- Member of town planning committee, Tel Aviv, 1934
- Executive member of the Engineers’ and Architects’ Association, 1936
- Chairman of the I.I.A., Israel Institute of Architects, 1955
- Rokach Prize for Architecture (awarded by the Tel Aviv Municipality), 1960
- Leader of discussion on industrial prefabrication at the U.I.A. Congress in London, 1961
- Honorary member of Royal Institute of British Architects (RIBA), 1962
- Israel Prize, for architecture, 1962
- Member of Public Health Group of the U.I.A., 1962
- Member or the Executive of the U.I.A., 1963–1967
- Golden Medal of the Mexican Institute of Architects, 1963
- Chairman of the National Council for National Parks and Nature Reserves, 1964
- Honorary Member of the Academy of Arts, Berlin, 1965
- President of the Association of Engineers and Architects in Israel, 1965–1971
- Honorary Member of the Association of German Architects, 1967
- Chairman of the I.T.C.C. (International Technical Cooperation Center) World Congress on: Technological Development of Israel and the Developing Countries, and of the I.T.C.C. World Congress: Dialogue in Development, in 1967 and 1970
- Honorary Fellow of the AIA - American Institute of Architects, 1970
- Member of the Curatorium, Bauhaus Archive Berlin, 1975

== Published works ==
=== Books ===
- “Physical Planning in Israel”, Tel Aviv, 1951.
- “Hospitals in Israel and the Developing Countries”, Tel Aviv, 1968.
- “Planning Jerusalem: The Old City and its Environs”, Weidenfeld and Nicolson Jerusalem, 1973.
- “Kibbutz + Bauhaus: an architect’s way in a new land“, Karl Krämer Verlag Stuttgart and Massada Israel, 1976.
- “University of Ife Master Plan”, Egboramy Co. & Arieh Sharon, Eldar Sharon, 1981.

=== Articles ===
- "entwurf für das haus des arbeiterrats in jerusalem", (plans, perspective and description of the project in German), published in quarterly of the Bauhaus, edited by Hannes Meyer: "bauhaus januar 1929", pp. 22 and 23
- Planning in Israel in "Israel and Middle East" (Tel Aviv), March 1952 and in “Town Planning Review” (Liverpool), April 1952
- Collective Settlements in Israel in “Town Planning Review” (Liverpool), January 1955
- Hospitals in Israel in ”World Hospitals (London), Vol. 1”, 1964
- Medical Centres and Hospitals in Developing Countries in “Dialogue in Development (Proceedings of the 2nd World Congress of Engineers and Architects in Israel), Tel Aviv 1970
- Planning Jerusalem in “Ekistics” (Athens), November 1974.

=== Podcast ===
- Podcast about Arieh Sharon with his grandson, Ariel Aloni on bauhaus faces podcast, 50:08 minutes, host: Dr. Anja Guttenberger, published on June 4, 2024], Sep. 3, 2025

== Exhibitions ==
- Architecture in Eretz Israel, Habima Theater, Tel Aviv, September 1944.
- National Exhibition, Tel Aviv Museum of Art, February 1950.
- Conquest of the Desert (Kibbush Hashemama), International Convention Center (Jerusalem), September 1953.
- 50 years bauhaus, Stuttgart 1967 (exhib. catalogue pp. 202,203)
- Tel Aviv – Neues Bauen 1930–1939, Stuttgart 1993, (exhib. catalogue in German by Irmel Kamp-Bandau).
- White City: International Style Architecture in Israel: A Portrait of an Era, (exhib. cat. by Michael Levin), Tel Aviv Museum of Art, 1984, Jewish Museum (New York), 1984/5
- The Israeli Project, (exhib. cat. in Hebrew by Zvi Efrat), Tel Aviv Museum of Art 2001.
- Solo Exhibition: Kibbutz+Bauhaus: an architect's way in a new land, Bauhaus Archive Berlin, 1976 (exhib. cat.); the exhibition was shown in: Essen, Zurich (1977), Munich, Stuttgart, Hamburg, Mexico City (1978), Washington, New York, Philadelphia (1979) and Chicago (1980).
- Solo Exhibition: Bauhaus, Kibbutz und die Vision vom Neuen Menschen, Goethe Institute Tel Aviv, 1994.
- Solo Exhibition: "Who are you Arieh Sharon", HaHalalit, Hayarkon Street 70, Tel Aviv, May 2008.
- Arieh Sharon – Bauhaus pupil and architect, Exhibition I 15.05. – 14.06.2009, Erfurt, Germany. Part of the Bauhaus 2009 celebration in Thuringia.
- Kibbutz and Bauhaus Exhibition, 2011–2012, Bauhaus Dessau Foundation, Dessau, Germany.
- Arieh Sharon: Architect of the State Tel Aviv Museum of Art, 2018.

== See also ==
- List of Israel Prize recipients
- Architecture of Israel
