= Levant Fair =

Coordinates: 32°5′53.60″N 34°46′32.08″E

1933 Tel Aviv
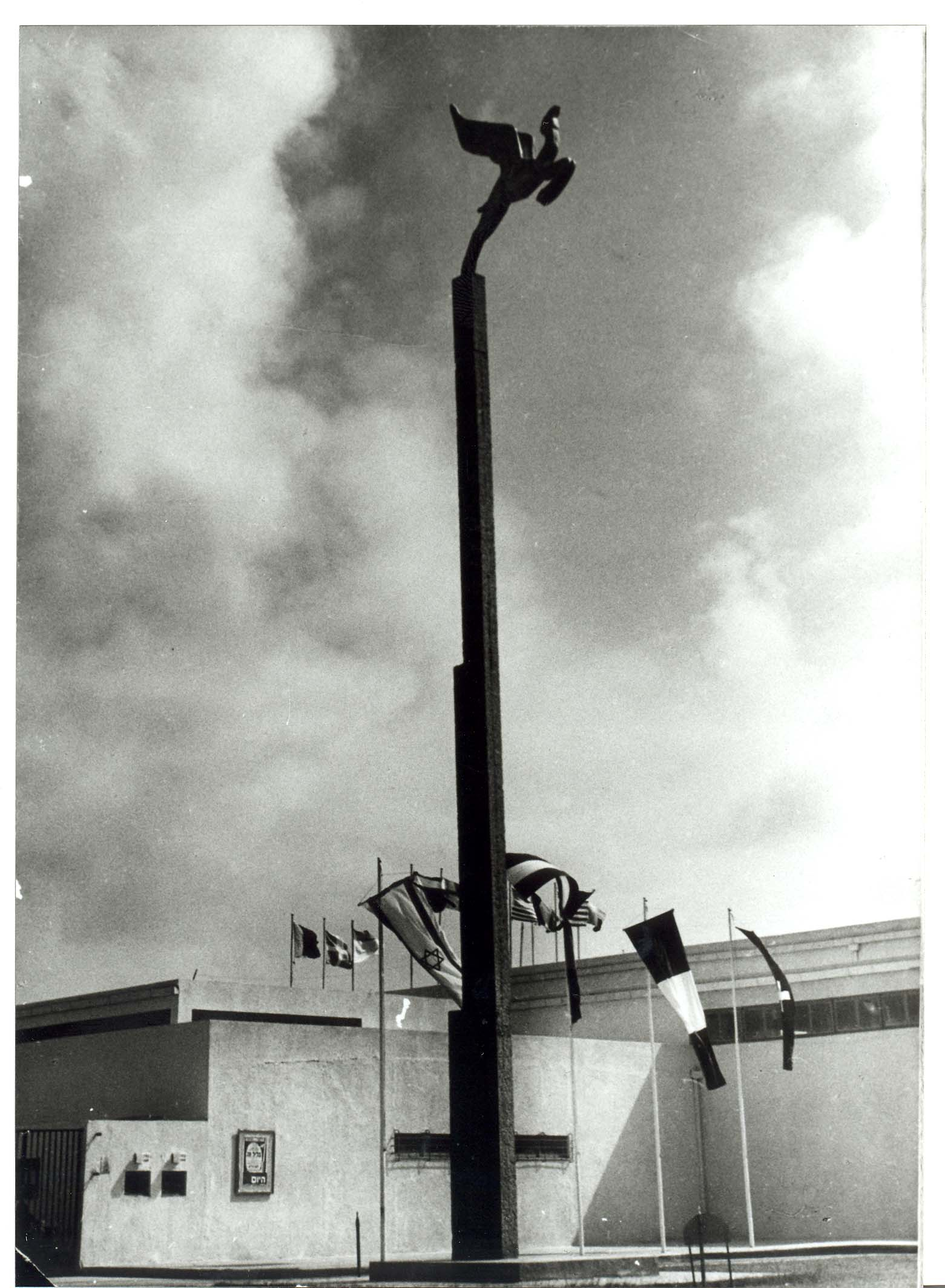
- the logo of the Flying Camel at the main entrance that was the sign of the fair

Overview
- BIE-class: Unrecognized exposition
- Name: Levant Fair
- Area: 10 hectares (25 acres)
- Visitors: 600,000

Participant(s)
- Countries: 36

Location
- Country: Mandatory Palestine
- City: Tel Aviv
- Venue: Tel Aviv Port

Timeline
- Opening: 26 April 1934
- Closure: 26 May 1934

Specialized expositions

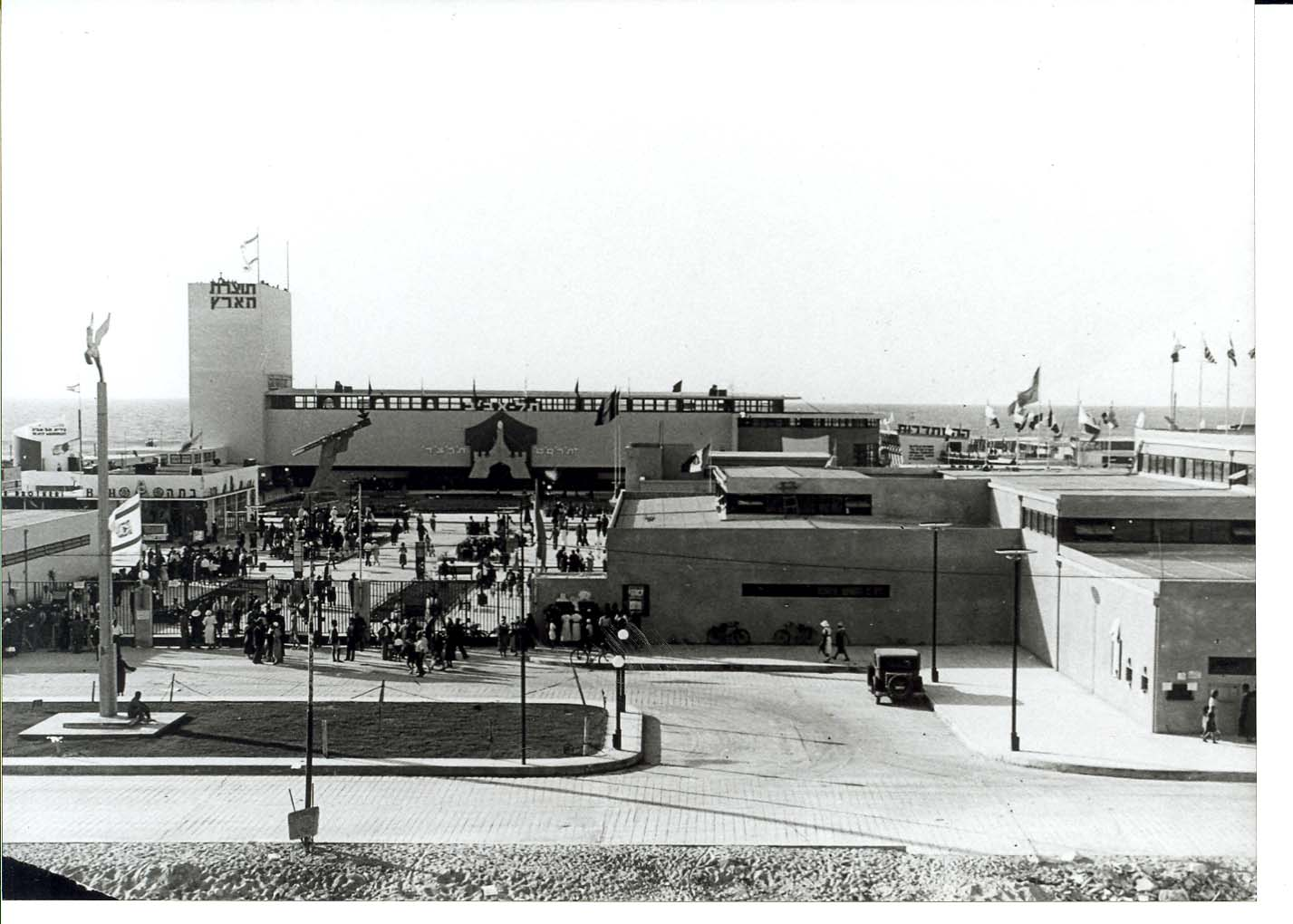
Herbert Plumer Square - that was the central entrance

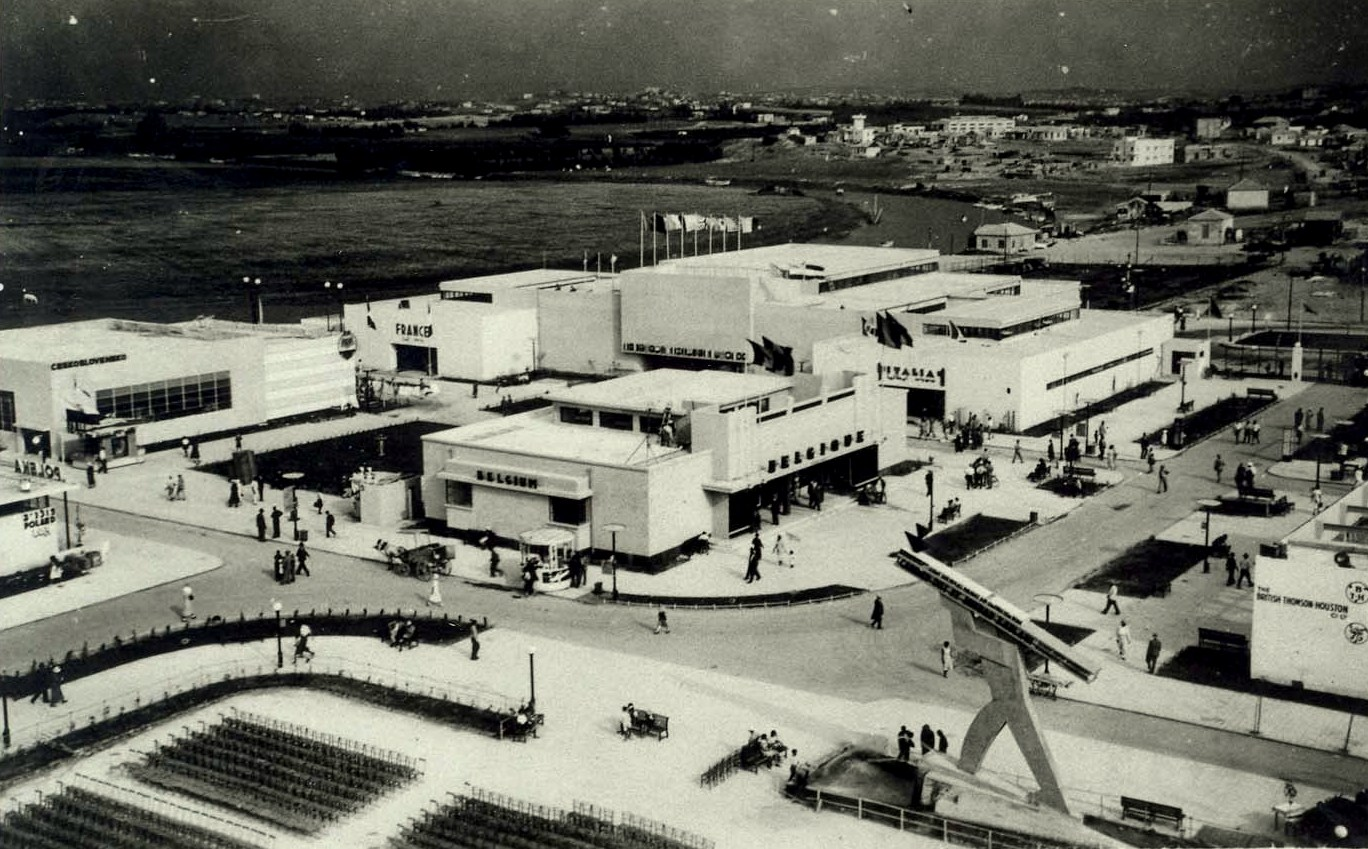
Aerial view of the Levant Fair in the 1930s

The Levant Fair (Hebrew: יריד המזרח; Yarid HaMizrach) was an international trade fair held in Tel Aviv, Mandatory Palestine during the 1920s and 1930s.

== History ==
=== Early years ===
One of the early precursors to the Levant Fair, an exhibition titled the "Exhibition and Fair for the Promotion of Goods Made in Israel", took place in April 1914 and was held at a boys' school in Tel Aviv. Another such show was held in the summer of 1923 in three rooms of the Zionist Club on Rothschild Boulevard. This exhibition's success in turn paved the way for five subsequent exhibitions. The success also improved the area provided by the municipality for entrepreneurs, a desolate, southern part of Tel Aviv with an old bus station. The area is now home to the Administration Building of the Society for the Protection of Nature.

There were further exhibitions in 1925, two in 1926, 1929, and one in 1932, with the fair in 1932 being the first to be called the "Levant Fair". A special symbol called the "Flying Camel" was designed for the fair by its chief architect, Aryeh Elhanani. Trees were planted during the fair in honor of the former exhibition, and three such palm trees survive to this day.

Henceforth, these exhibitions were referred to as fairs and also became quite successful, attracting tens of thousands and then hundreds of thousands of Jews, Arabs, English, and tourists. The 1932 fair was visited by nearly 300,000 people. Voice Jerusalem, a Jewish-Palestinian radio station, began regular broadcasts about the fair, in Hebrew, starting in 1936.

Visitors to the fair included British High Commissioners for Palestine Herbert Samuel (1920-1925), Herbert Plumer (1925-1928), John Chancellor (1928-1931), and Arthur Wauchope (1932-1937), as well as Palestinian mayors of Jaffa and Jerusalem Assem Bey Said, Raghib al-Nashashibi and Hussein Khalidi.

=== New fair grounds (1933-36) ===
As the scope of the exhibition expanded, it became necessary to construct a permanent home for the fair and others like it. High Commissioner Arthur Wauchope, who had supported the Yishuv, liked the idea and helped to designate the Yarkon Peninsula, an area north of the city, for the construction of the complex. On 17 August 1933 a cornerstone ceremony was held there, which featured Wauchope, Meir Dizengoff, and other community leaders.

The 1934 fair opened at the new constructed exhibition grounds at the north edge of Dizengoff Street next to the Tel Aviv Port on 26 April 1934. The fair was opened by the High Commissioner, Arthur Wauchope. A point of celebration at the fair was a Jubilee for the twenty-fifth anniversary of the founding of Tel Aviv. With 600,000 people from thirty countries participating in the fair during its six weeks, the fair was also a major event for the local economy.

The fair covered an area of ten hectares, including display booths of the participating countries, landscaping and gardening, new roads, Luna Park, and various sculptures. The fair was of great importance for the local architecture and design of Tel Aviv, with pavilions being built by prominent Jewish architects of the time, including Aryeh Elhanani, Richard Kauffmann, and Arieh Sharon. The fair's emblem, envisioned by Alexander Ezer and designed by Aryeh Elhanani, was a winged camel, nicknamed "The Flying Camel." The plaza at the fair's entrance way was named "Plumer Square" in honor of the High Commissioner Herbert Plumer. The fair's masthead flying camel statue built by architect Aryeh Elhanani in 1932, was located in the plaza and near the mouth of the Yarkon Maccabiah Stadium. A broad amphitheater was also established near the entrance way.

The central pavilion of the fair was made in Palestine and designed by architect Richard Kauffmann in the shape of a ship. A sculpture called "The Hebrew Worker", built by Aryeh Elhanani, stands on the site today. Other statues built for the fair include "Rejected Lot's Wife", "Sower Statue", "Statue of Deer", and "Statue of the Woman". The fair also put great emphasis on design elements, such as the flagpoles which filled the fair's roads. Foreign design elements were also included, such as lampposts which were headed by a round plate and placed under incandescent bulbs.

The fair also included a Lebanese Pavilion which, according to the then Lebanese President, intended to foster the traditional friendship between the two neighbours. The pavilion was a relief of ancient Baalbek, which can still be seen in Tel Aviv today.

Another fair was held in 1936, but because of the riots that began two weeks prior to the opening and shut down the port of Jaffa, it was a small fair, far smaller in scope than its predecessor. Many events were cancelled and many exhibitors cancelled their participation in the exhibition. This fair also caused financial losses for the company that organised it.

=== After closure ===
After 1936, and for the duration of the Second World War, the Levant Fair ceased operation and fairgrounds were converted into an alternative fairgrounds complex.

Urban development of the peninsula at the mouth of the Yarkon led to further expansion of Tel Aviv. Some development continued north, beyond the Yarkon, including the establishment of the Tel Aviv Port, in 1936; the Sde Dov Airport, also in 1936; and the Reading Power Station, in 1938. In 1938 the Maccabiah Stadium was also built nearby, and the Philharmonic Orchestra Hall was built within the area of the former fairgrounds.

When the Tel Aviv Port was built near the site in 1936, the port was used to store a temporary Levant Fair, and thus the street leading to the harbour is named "Zion's Gate".

In December 1936, the fairgrounds were the location of one of the first concerts of the Palestine Philharmonic Orchestra, the future Israel Philharmonic Orchestra, under the baton of Arturo Toscanini.

During World War II, the fairgrounds were taken over by the British Army and used for their military training. During the 1947–1949 Palestine war, the fairground structures were used for storage of the IDF.

After Israeli independence, the fairgrounds were abandoned and became the site for various workshops and garages. Some of the original buildings were destroyed and others crumbled. The sculptures and works of art from the fair have mostly disappeared from the former fairgrounds, except for the Hebrew Worker statue, which has been restored. Plumer Square is now a parking lot.

In 1959, a new exhibition grounds opened at 101, Rokach Ave., beyond the Yarkon River. The grounds were opened by then Mayor Chaim Levanon, along with "Exhibition 50 years of Tel Aviv" and a design plan for a "Fair Middle" by architect Aryeh Elhanani.

=== 2000s: part of "Namal" entertainment area ===
In recent years there has been a rehabilitation effort at the old fairgrounds, which turned it into a shopping and entertainment area attached to the wider 'Namal' ("port") development.

==== Memorials ====
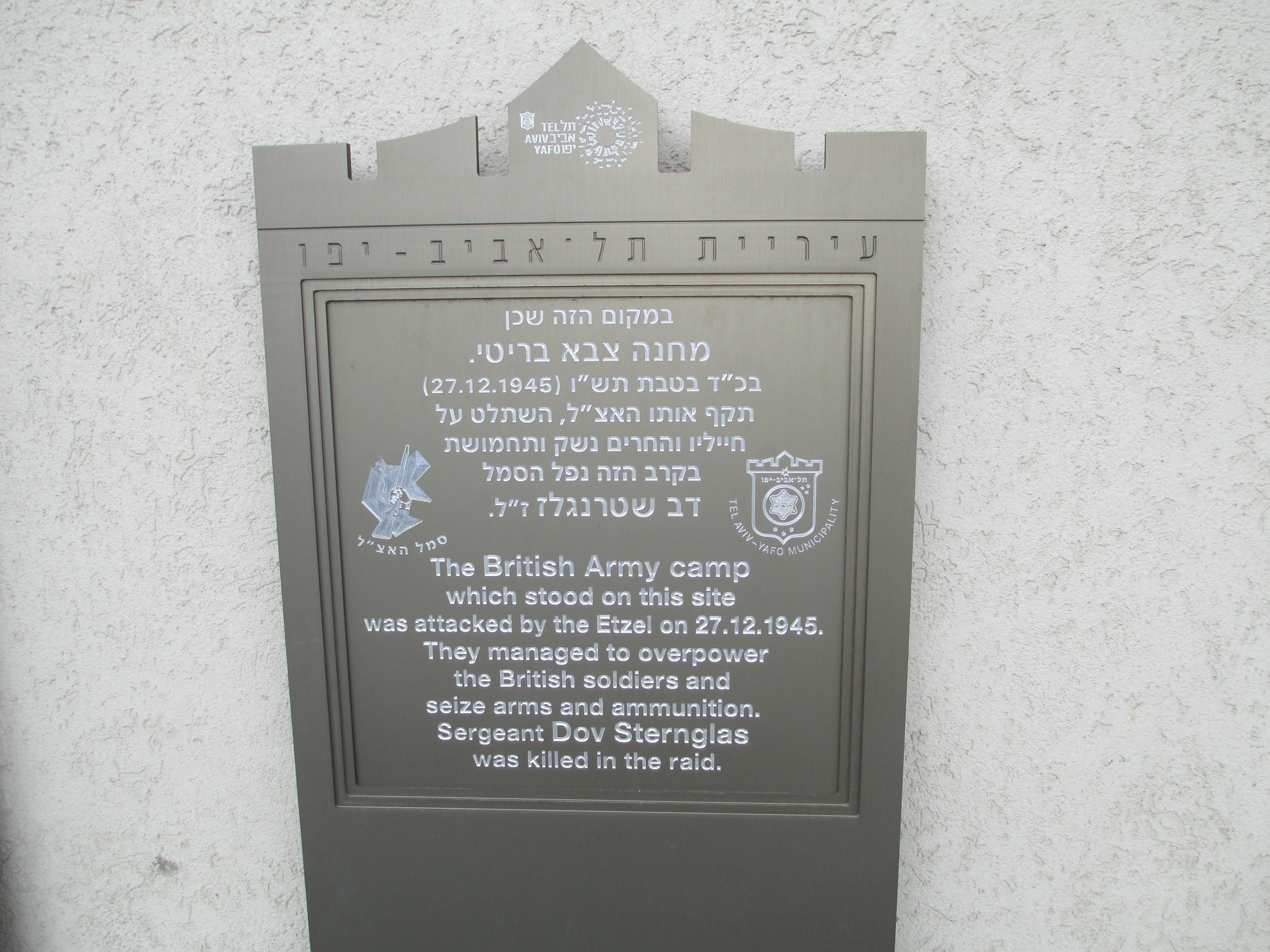
Plaque commemorating 1945 Irgun attack on British military camp

There are two memorials placed at the entrance to the former fairgrounds. One is dedicated to the Haganah-run secret weapons factory, once hidden inside the Romanian pavilion. The other one commemorates the 27 December 1945 Irgun attack on the local British military camp, in which Jewish underground fighters seized British weapons and ammunition. It remembers Irgun fighter Dov Sternglas a.k.a. 'Sergeant Avner', who died from the wounds he suffered in the attack.

== Gallery ==
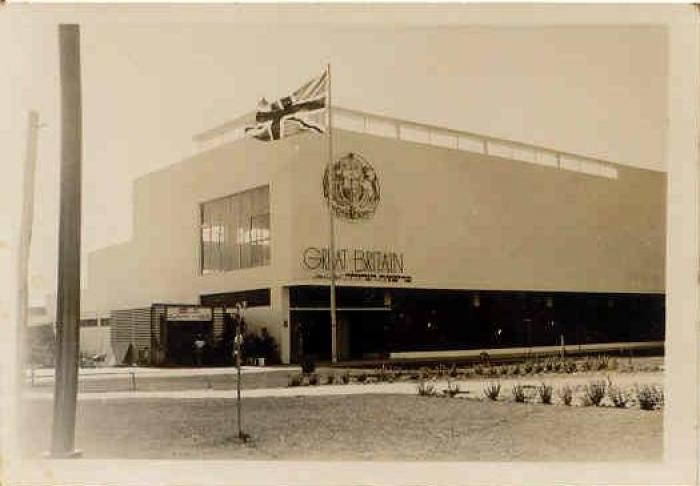
The British pavilion

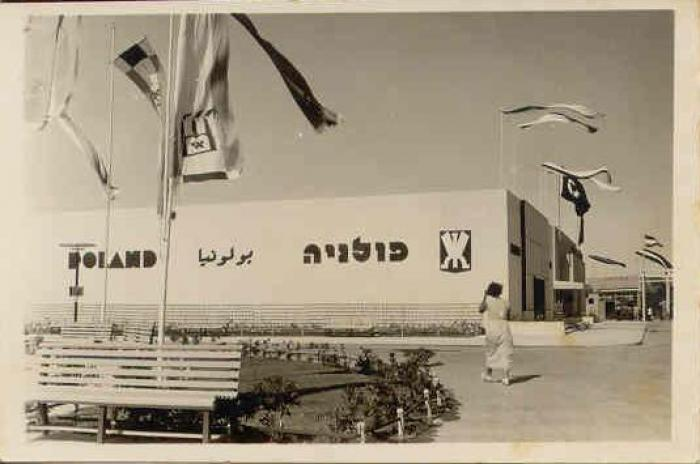
The Polish pavilion

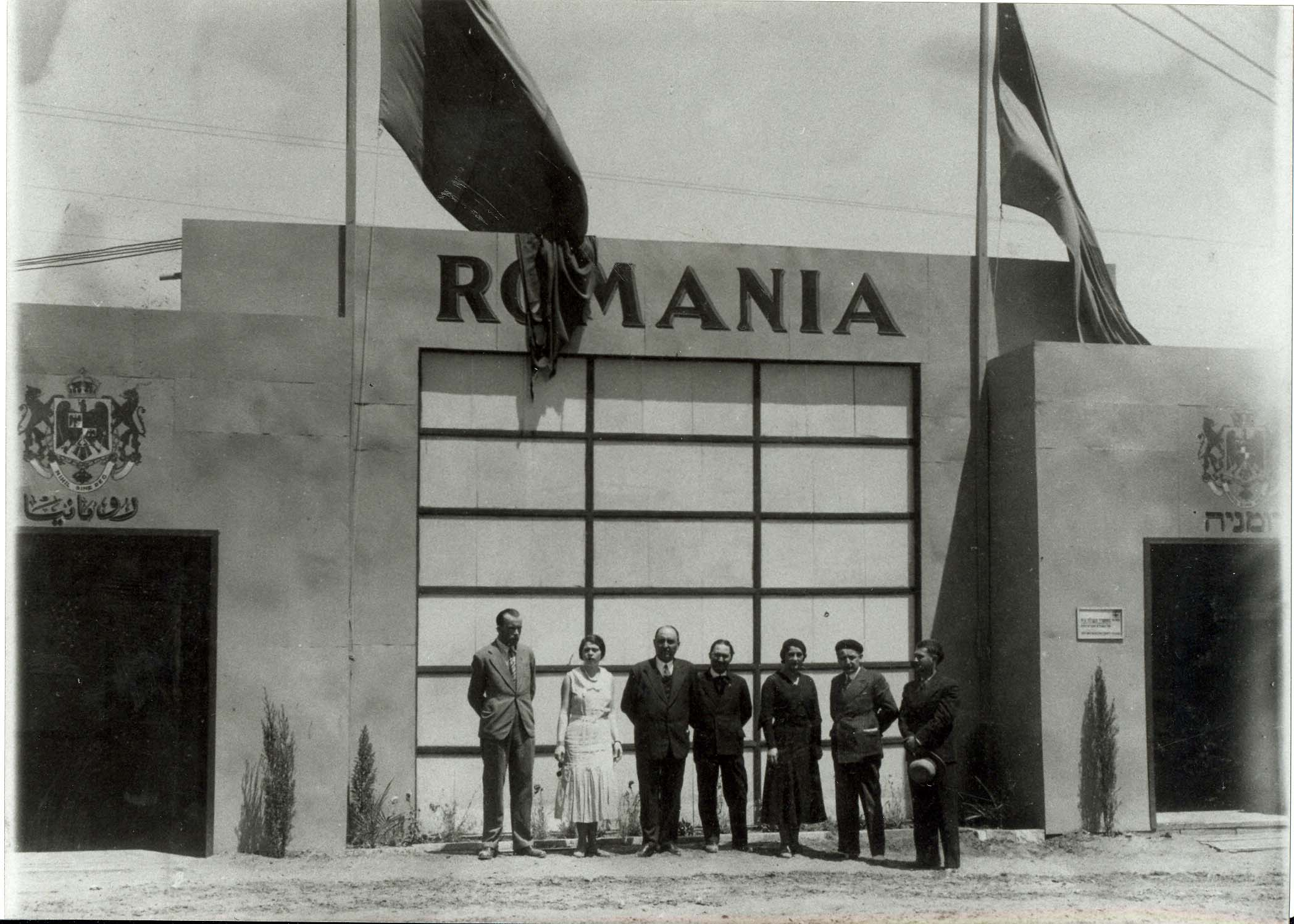
The Romanian pavilion

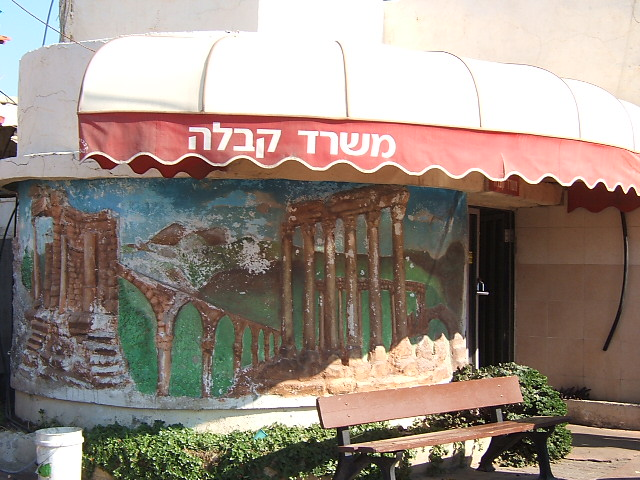
The Lebanese pavilion prior to its renovation

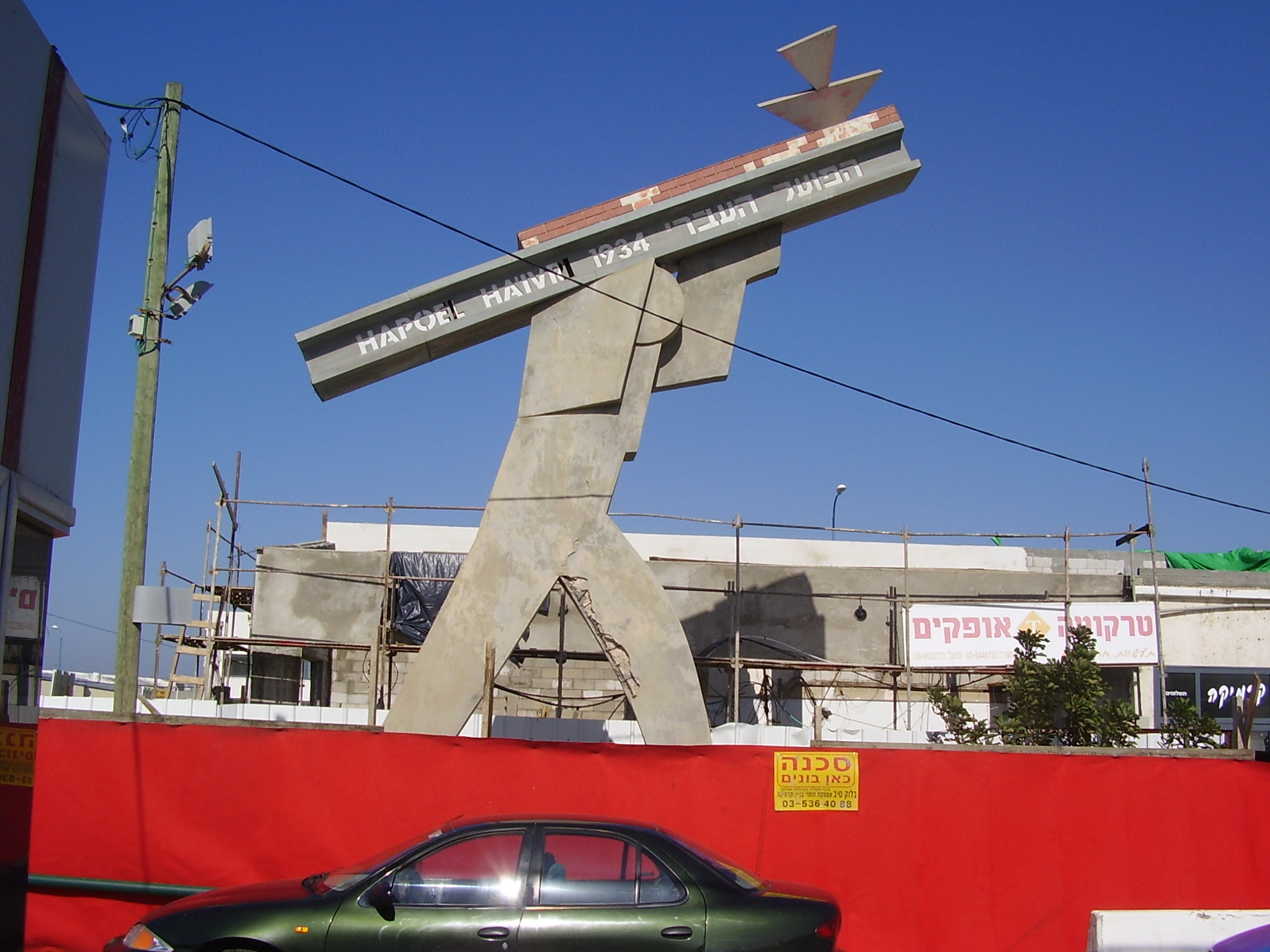
The Hebrew Worker statue (from 1934)

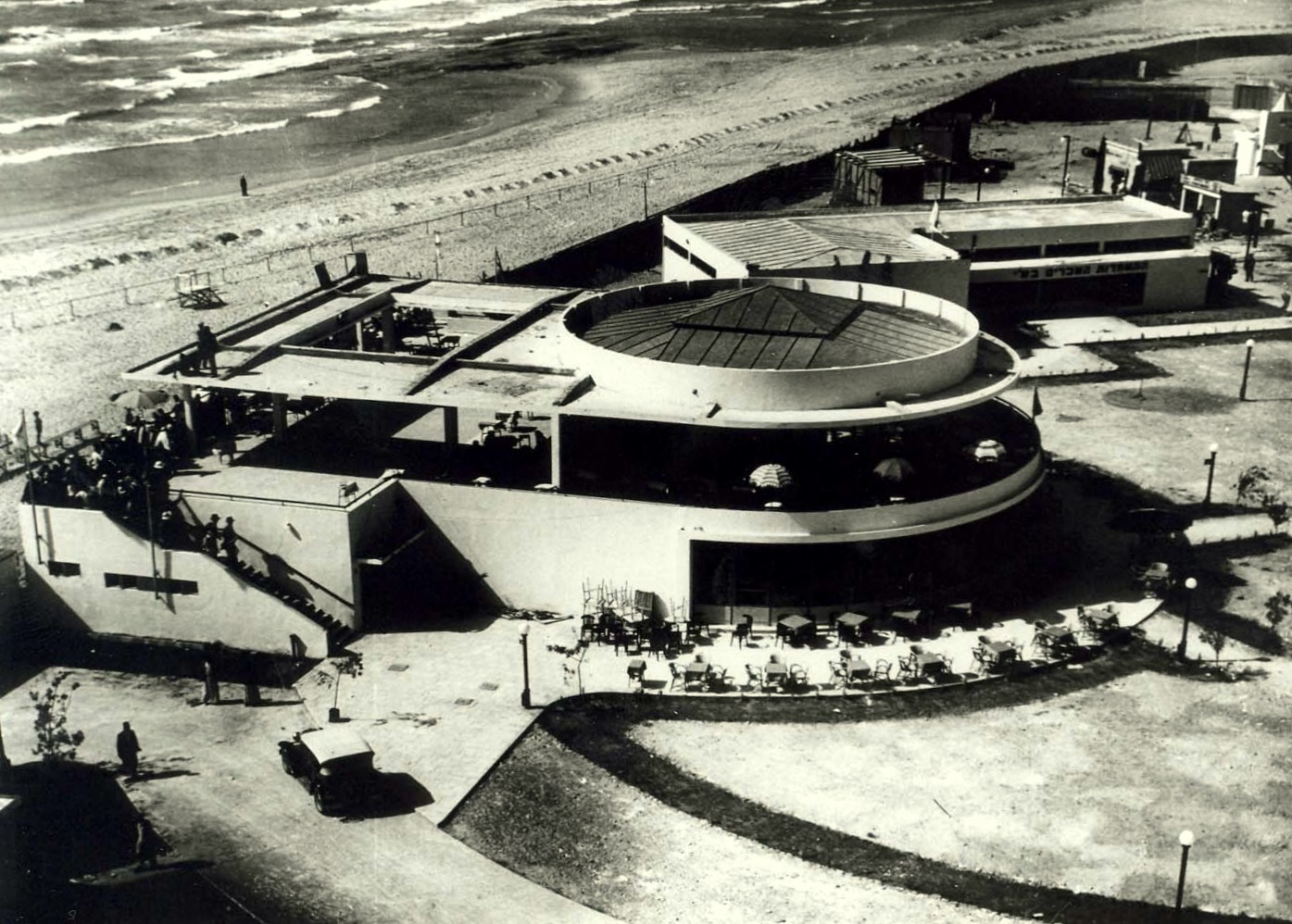
Galina Coffee House - that was built in the International Style

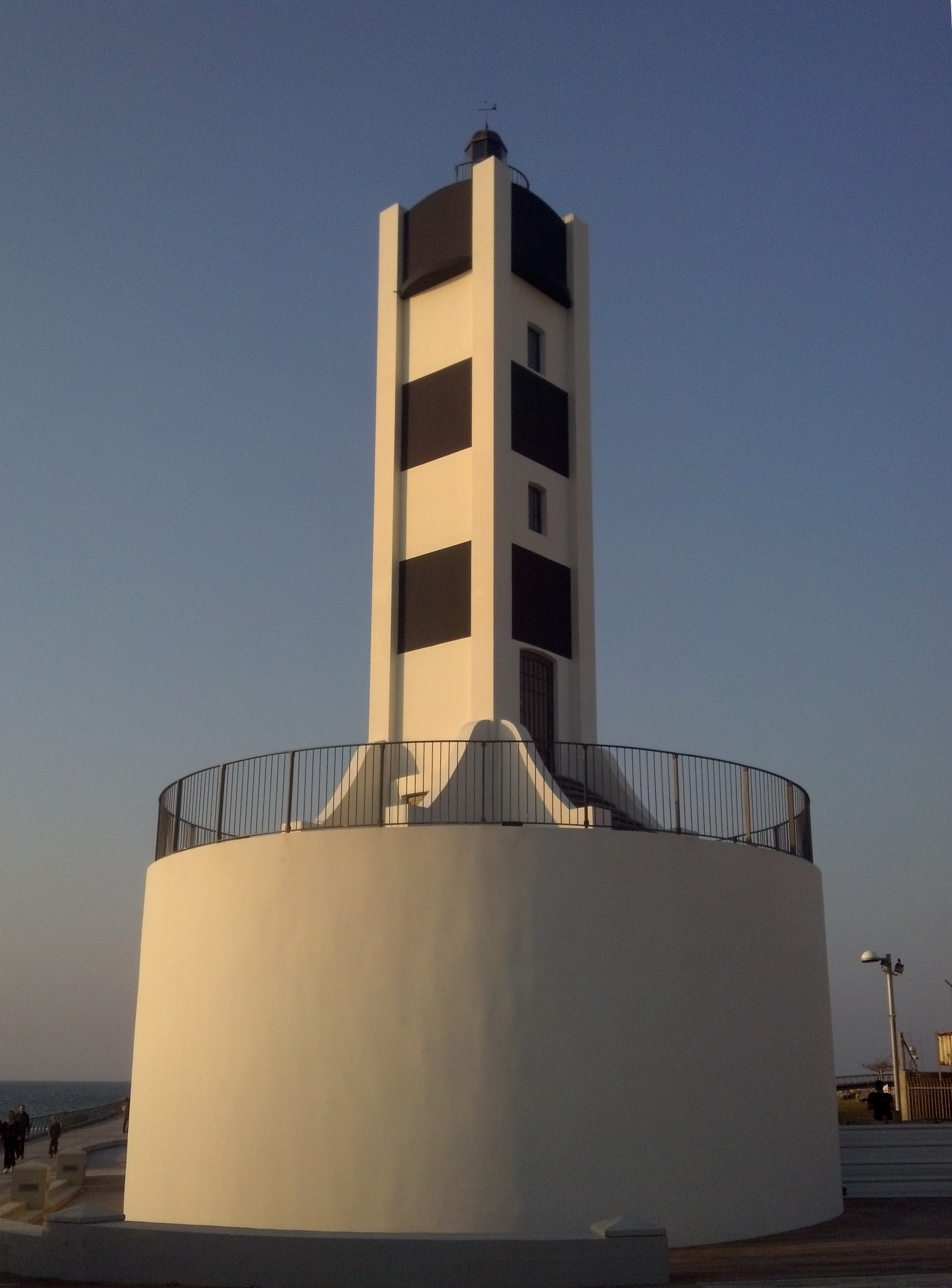
The Reading Light - that was built for the Tel Aviv port

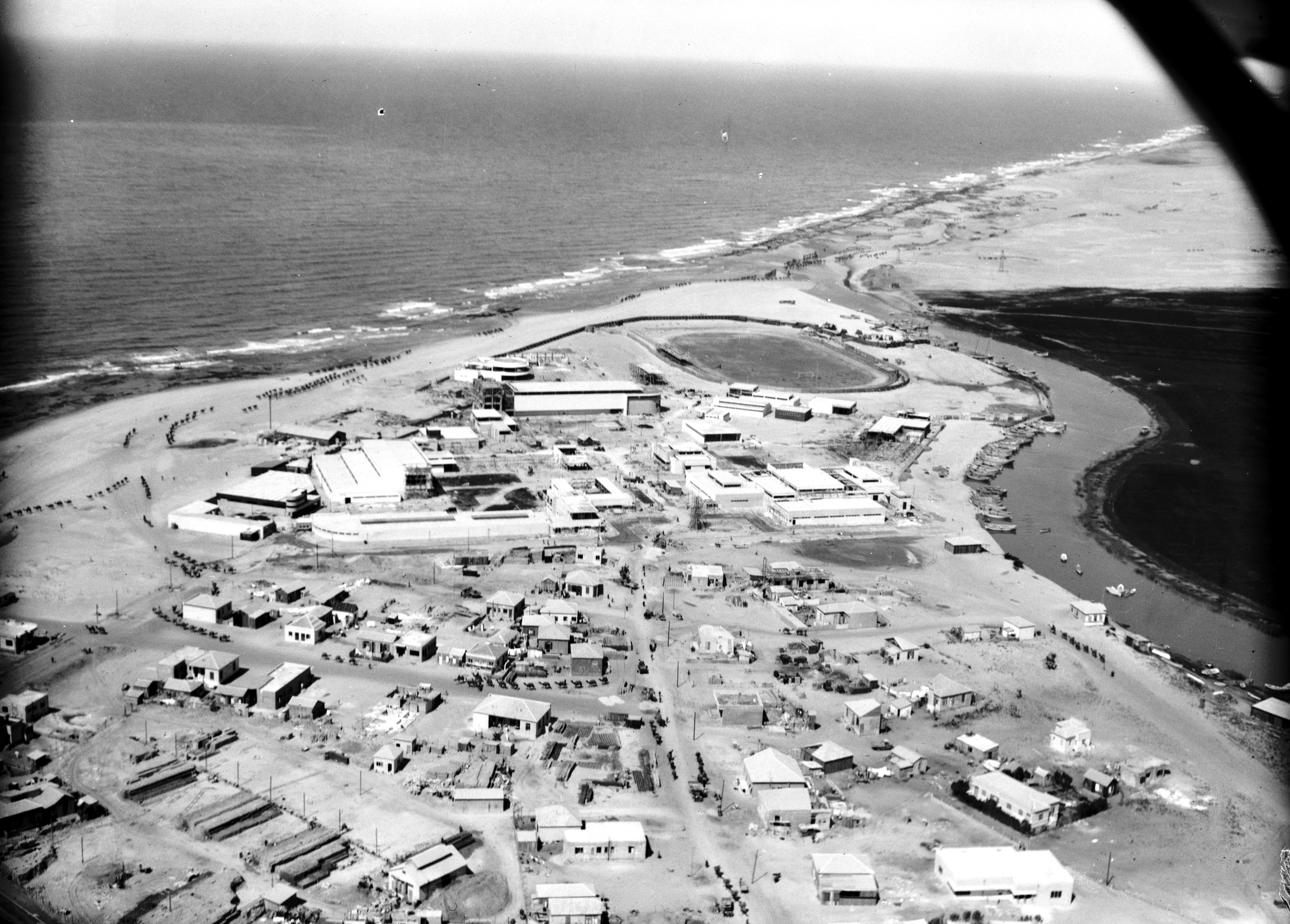
The Maccabiah Stadium - that was built next to the Yarkon River

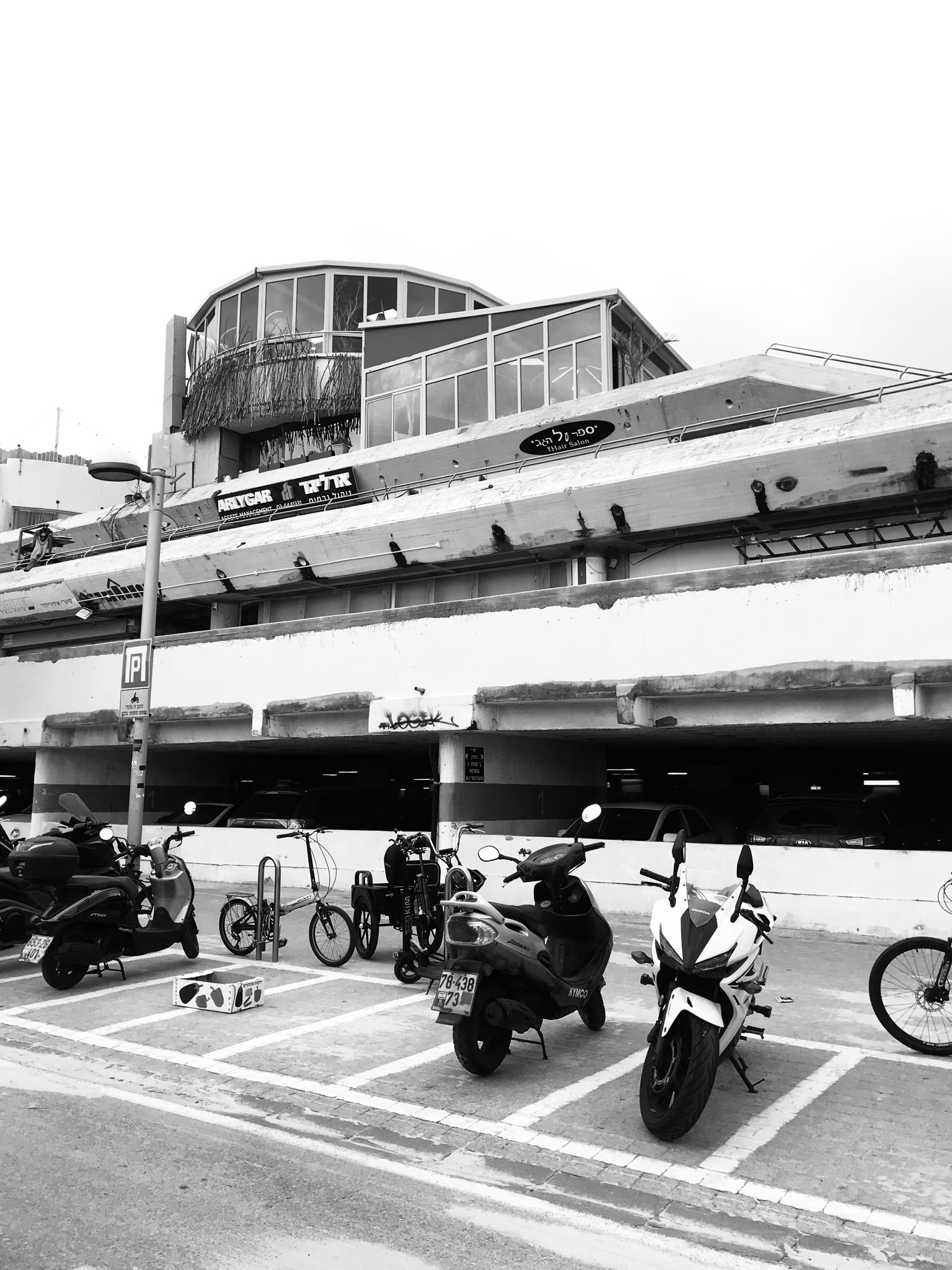
Levant Fair winter day

== See also ==
- Tel Aviv Port
- Israel Trade Fairs & Convention Center
- Economy of Israel
- History of Tel Aviv
