= Alexander Ezer =

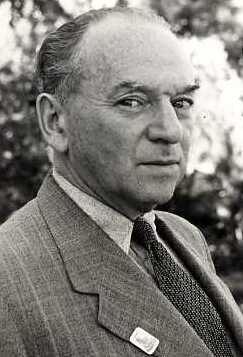
Alexander Ezer

Alexander Ezer (May 10, 1894 – 1973), formerly Alexander Yevzerov, was a leader of the Zionist movement in Siberia, before moving to Palestine under British mandate in 1921. He became a proponent of expanding commerce, tourism, and industry in both the pre-state Yishuv and the then-newly established State of Israel. In 1931 he was elected to the parliament of Palestine, representing the Revisionist Party of Ze'ev Jabotinsky.

Ezer was the chief designer of the Middle East pavilion at the 1939 New York World's Fair and the organizer of the 1928 and 1934 Levant Industrial Fairs (Levant Fair or "Yerid Hamizrach"). He was the founder of Binyanei HaUma and organized its first international exhibition, Kibush Hashmama in 1953.

== Early life and education ==
Alexander Yevzerov (later Ezer), son of Miriam née Silifka and Manuel Yevzerov (the nephew of "Hamagid Hayadua" Yehuda Tzvi Yevzerov), was born on May 10, 1894, in Pryluky, Ukraine. In 1913-1915 he attended the Psychoneurological Institute in Saint Petersburg. In 1915 he transferred to the University of Tomsk in Siberia to complete his law degree. In St. Petersburg he established a Zionist student organization called The Friend and was the editor of a magazine distributed to Jewish students throughout Russia. Then, while living in Siberia, the Russian Revolution broke out, and Yevzerov was involved in Zionist activities and support for Jewish political prisoners sent to Siberia.

== Career ==
=== Escape from Siberia ===
The Bolshevik revolution and the oppression of Jews led Yevzerov to escape from Siberia. He journeyed by trains, horses, and then by camel through the Gobi Desert to reach Harbin, China in October 1920, and then to Shanghai. He found a thriving community of Jewish refugees in China.

Together with another Zionist activist, Moishe Novomeiski (chairman of the National Counsel of the Far East Jews), Yevzerov established the weekly periodical Siberia-Palestine that later was renamed Jewish Life. The publication continued until 1943 under the editorship of Abraham Kaufman. Yevzerov was also active in the "underground rail-road" to help Russian refugees in China get certificates to allow them to immigrate to the Land of Israel (which was under the British mandate at the time).

=== Journey to Palestine ===
On June 12, 1921, together with 44 other members of the Siberian Zionist Organization, Yevzerov boarded the Lloyd Triestino Nippon cargo ship. After 40 days at sea they arrived at Port Said in Egypt, and then took another ship to Jaffa in Palestine.

In Jaffa, Yevzerov joined the "Siberian Group" of new immigrants that set to pave the new road between Haifa and Geda, and then worked on British constructions in Jenin.

=== Industry ===
Yevzerov developed a vision of making Israel an industrial powerhouse. He began to organize local industrial exhibitions in 1923 and 1924, which later were expanded into an international Fairs, the 1928 and 1934 "Levant Fairs" (or Orient Fair). The symbol of the fairs was the flying camel, envisioned by Ezer and designed by the architect Arie Elchanani. These fairs grew rapidly: in the Levant Fair of 1934, 820 international companies were represented and 600,000 people from around the world came to see the public exhibitions. At the time, Tel Aviv was only populated by about 35,000 people. To accommodate the fair, Alexander and Meir Dizengoff (the first mayor of Tel Aviv) established the company "Mischar Ve Taasia" (Trade and Industry Publishing and Exhibition Co.), which purchased land north of Tel Aviv to develop the fair grounds. They also published a bi-weekly magazine, "Mischar Ve Taasia", starting in 1925, with Ezer serving as its editor.

In 1927, Ezer published "Palestine from the Air", one of the first aerial photography ever taken in this region. Unfortunately, an Arab upheaval erupted in 1939, which made Tel Aviv a dangerous place for an international fair to be held. As a result, the Levant Fairs had to be canceled and instead Yevzerov organized the Middle-East pavilion of the 1939 World Fair held in New York City.

=== Politics ===
In 1931 Ezer was elected to the 3rd Assembly of Representatives (Mandatory Palestine) ("Asefat Hanivcharim") representing the Revisionist Party of Ze'ev Jabotinsky, and later served as chief adviser on tourism for the first government of Israel.

=== Change of name ===
After Israel fought and won its War of Independence in 1948, Yevserov and his good friend Moshe Shertok wanted new names to go along with their new state. They decided to make their new names synonyms of each other. Shertok changed his name to Sharett, which means "to serve" in Hebrew. Yevserov changed his name to Ezer, which means "to help" in Hebrew. (Moshe Sharett eventually became the first Israeli Minister of Foreign Affairs and the second Prime Minister of Israel after the first Prime Minister David Ben-Gurion resigned.)

=== Jerusalem ===
Ezer's next vision was to make Jerusalem, the new capital of Israel, a center for commerce, industry, and culture for Israel and the world's Jews. In 1950, he built the National Conference Center of Jerusalem (Binyanei HaUmah in Hebrew). Among the famous events held at the center were the Zionist Congress, a 1953 exhibition of Israel's achievements "blooming desert" and the 1958 exhibition for the 10th anniversary of Israel. Ezer helped in the publication of the first Israeli Encyclopedia, and he founded the International Club of Hebrew Literature. He thought that the best way to help the economy of the young state was to establish a strong tourism industry. He founded the Ministry of Tourism and became the first government adviser of tourism.

=== Writing ===
He also authored books and newspaper articles about the history of the Zionist movement, politics, art, culture and more. He started a radio broadcast for Soviet Jews who under the communist regime were not allowed any communications with the outside world. His radio provided the Soviet Jews with information about Israel in an attempt to contradict Soviet propaganda. His radio pseudonym was "Asaf-Tal-Or", a combination of the names of his three grandsons.

== Recognition ==
Ezer was listed as one of the 2,000 most influential men in the world and appears in Who's Who of World Jewry.

The mayor of Jerusalem Teddy Kollek gave him the honorary Medallion of the city.

== Personal life and death ==
=== Family ===
When Alexander fell ill with Malaria, he was sent to the hospital in Tel Aviv and fell in love with the nurse, who later became his wife, Rebecca Volkenstein (b. Chita, Siberia, 1897–1981). Rebecca herself was active in establishing the Hadassah Nursing School in Tel Aviv; she was the head nurse in that school and after moving to Jerusalem continued to work in Hadassah Medical Center and in other care centers until her 80s. Alexander and Rebecca had two children, Manuela Fuller and Gabriel (Gabbi) Ezer, 6 grandchildren and 14 great-grandchildren.

=== Death ===
In 1973, Alexander died after a long battle with cancer. Alexander and Rebecca are buried in Israel's Har HaMenuchot Cemetery in Givat Shaul, Jerusalem.
