= Arieh El-Hanani =

Israeli architect and Israel Prize recipient

- אריה אל-חנני
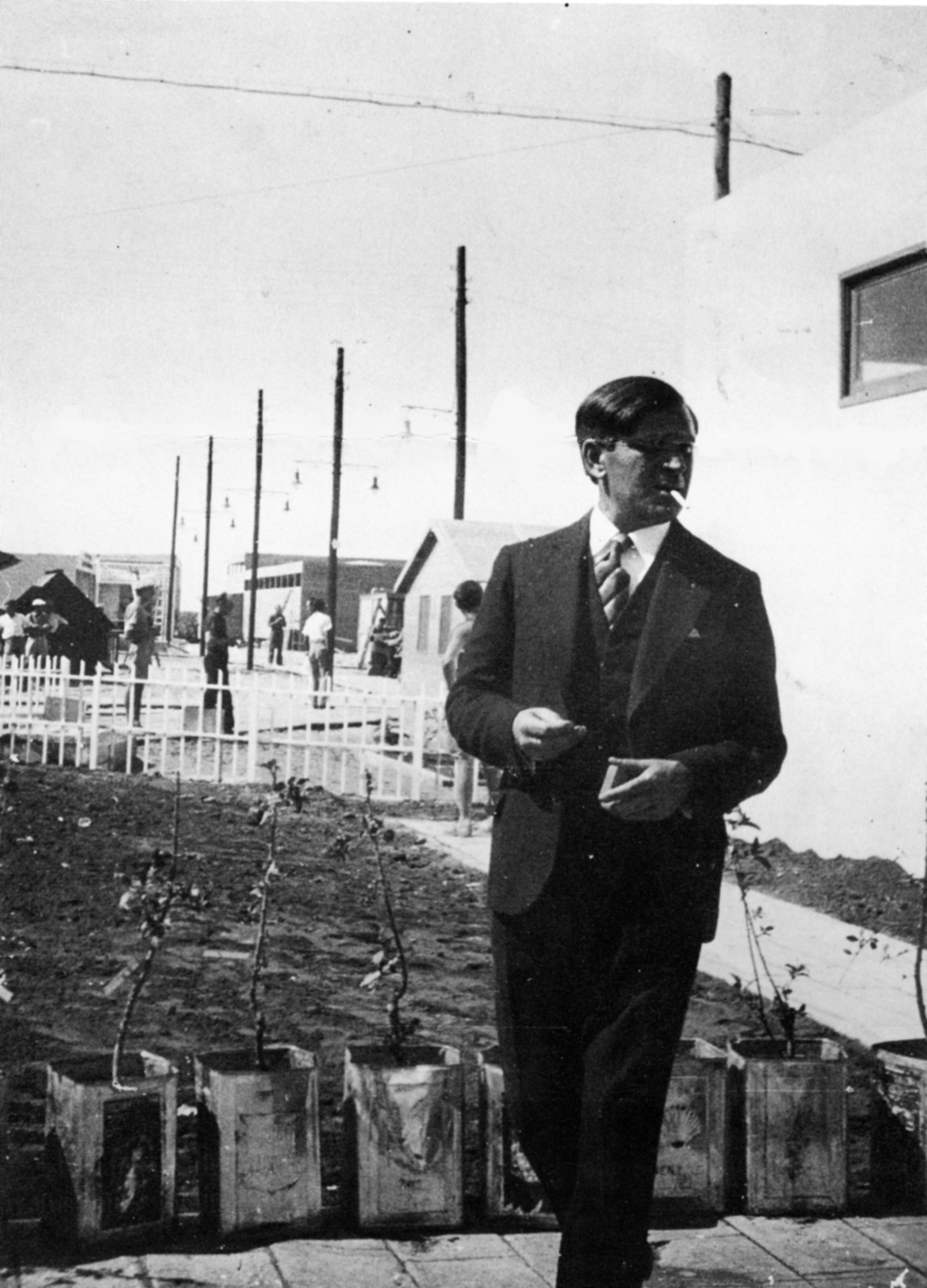
- El-Hanani at the Levant Fair, 1930s
- Born: Arieh Sapozhnikov; 1898; Poltava, Russian Empire (now Ukraine)
- Died: 1985 (aged 86–87)
- Other names: Arie, Aryeh Sapozhnikov, Elhanani
- Occupations: Architect, stage designer, graphic designer, sculptor, typographer
- Notable work: Hall of Remembrance, Yad Vashem; Wix Library, Weizmann Institute of Science; Gan Ha'ir Tower
- Awards: 1973: Israel Prize for Architecture

Arieh El-Hanani (Hebrew: אריה אל-חנני) born Sapozhnikov (1898–1985), was an Israel Prize winner in the field of architecture for his "contribution to shaping Israeli culture".

His Russian and Hebrew names have also been transliterated and spelled as Arie or Aryeh, Sapoznikov, Elhanani, etc.

== Early life in Russia ==
El-Hanani was born in 1898 in Poltava, Russian Empire (today capital of the Poltava Oblast in central Ukraine), as one of the five children of Elhanan (Afanasi) Sapozhnikov and Chava Liva Sapozhnikova.

Between 1913 and 1917, Elhanani completed a course in architecture at the Kiev School of Art and Architecture. In 1917 he joined a group of artists from Kharkov with whom he designed revolutionary propaganda posters.

== Mandate Palestine and Israel ==
In 1922 El-Hanani immigrated to Mandate Palestine, where he settled in Jerusalem.

=== Stage design ===
In the 1920s and 1930s Elhanani continued his avant-garde work by designing sets and costumes for theatre plays such as "Nishfei Peretz" (lit. 'Peretz soireés'; 1926) and "Megilat Esther" (lit. 'Book of Esther'; 1930). He designed the set for the first production of the ohel (lit. 'tent') workers' theatre, dedicated to the stories of Isaac Leib Peretz, and was one of the designers for the second ohel exhibition of 1927.

=== Trade fair design ===
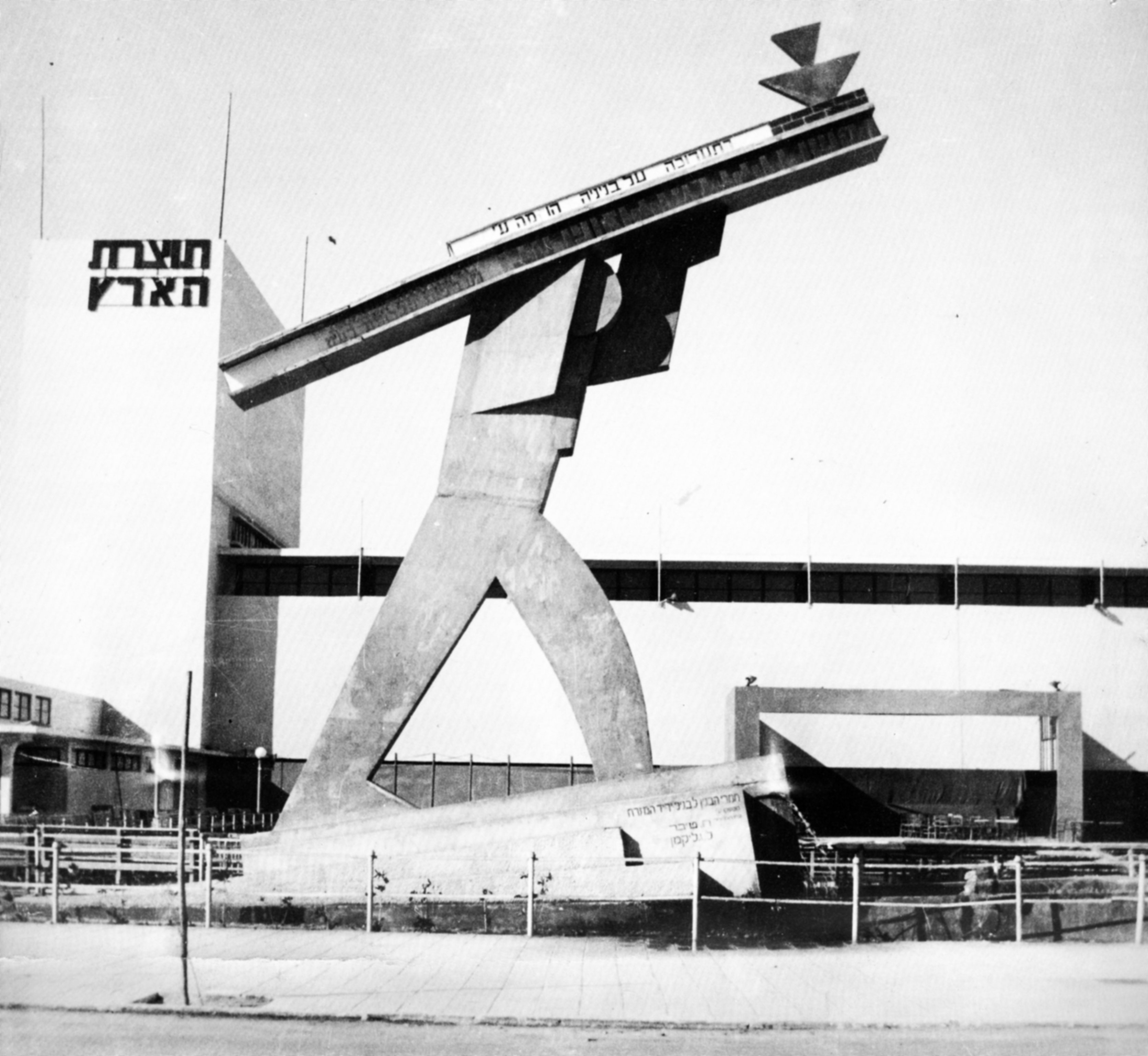
"The Hebrew Worker" statue at the Levant Fair, c. 1934

El-Hanani found work as a trade fair designer. In 1934 he both designed and managed the site of the Levant Fair in Tel Aviv. This rendered him responsible for some of the buildings and sculptures at the fair, most specifically the Fair's symbol, the Flying Camel. Also for the Fair he created an 8-meter high sculpture in the style of Russian Constructivism, known as "The Hebrew Laborer", erected in 1934 and restored in 1989 when the original material, iron, was replaced by concrete and steel. Eventually he designed pavilions for trade fairs abroad. El-Hanani also planned the Tel Aviv Convention Center.

=== Architecture ===
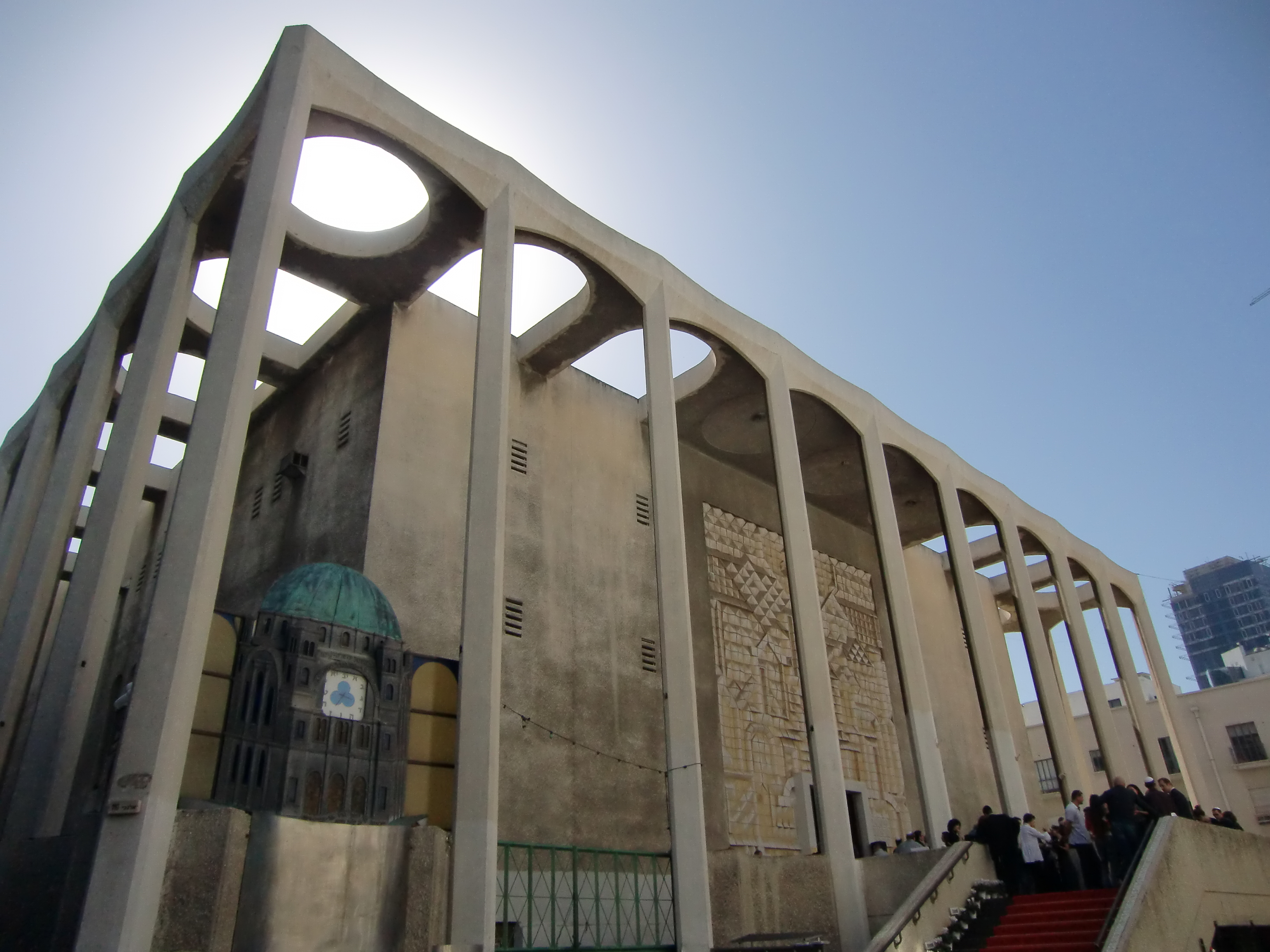
The Great Synagogue (Tel Aviv) after the substantial reconstruction by Elhanani (1969)

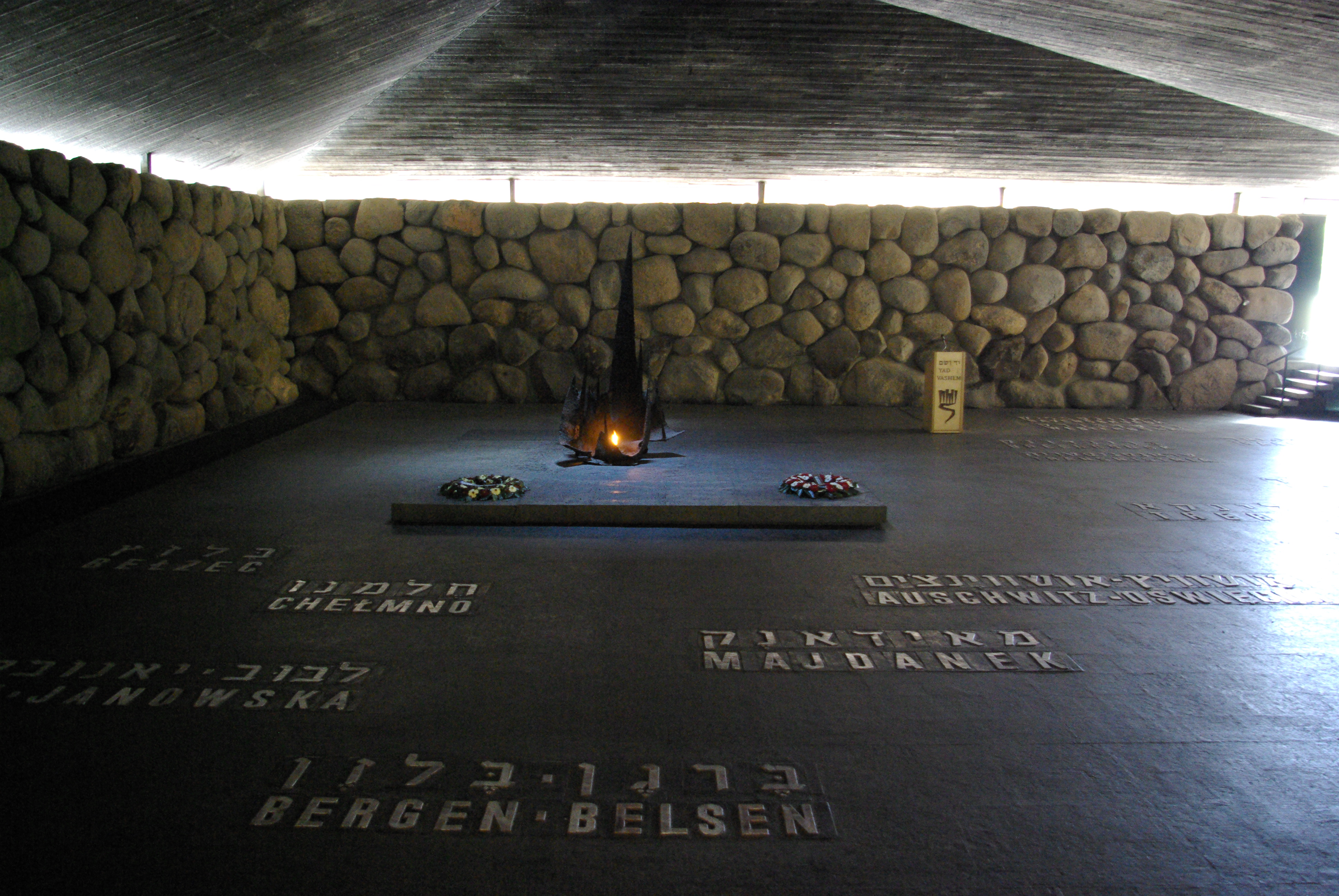
Yad Vashem, the Hall of Remembrance

El-Hanani designed a number of buildings, some of which have become iconic in Israel.

For Yad Vashem, the national Holocaust memorial, El-Hanani designed the Hall of Remembrance (1957-1961) working alongside Arieh Sharon and Benjamin Idelson, and participated as a judge in the design competition for the Valley of the Destroyed Communities.

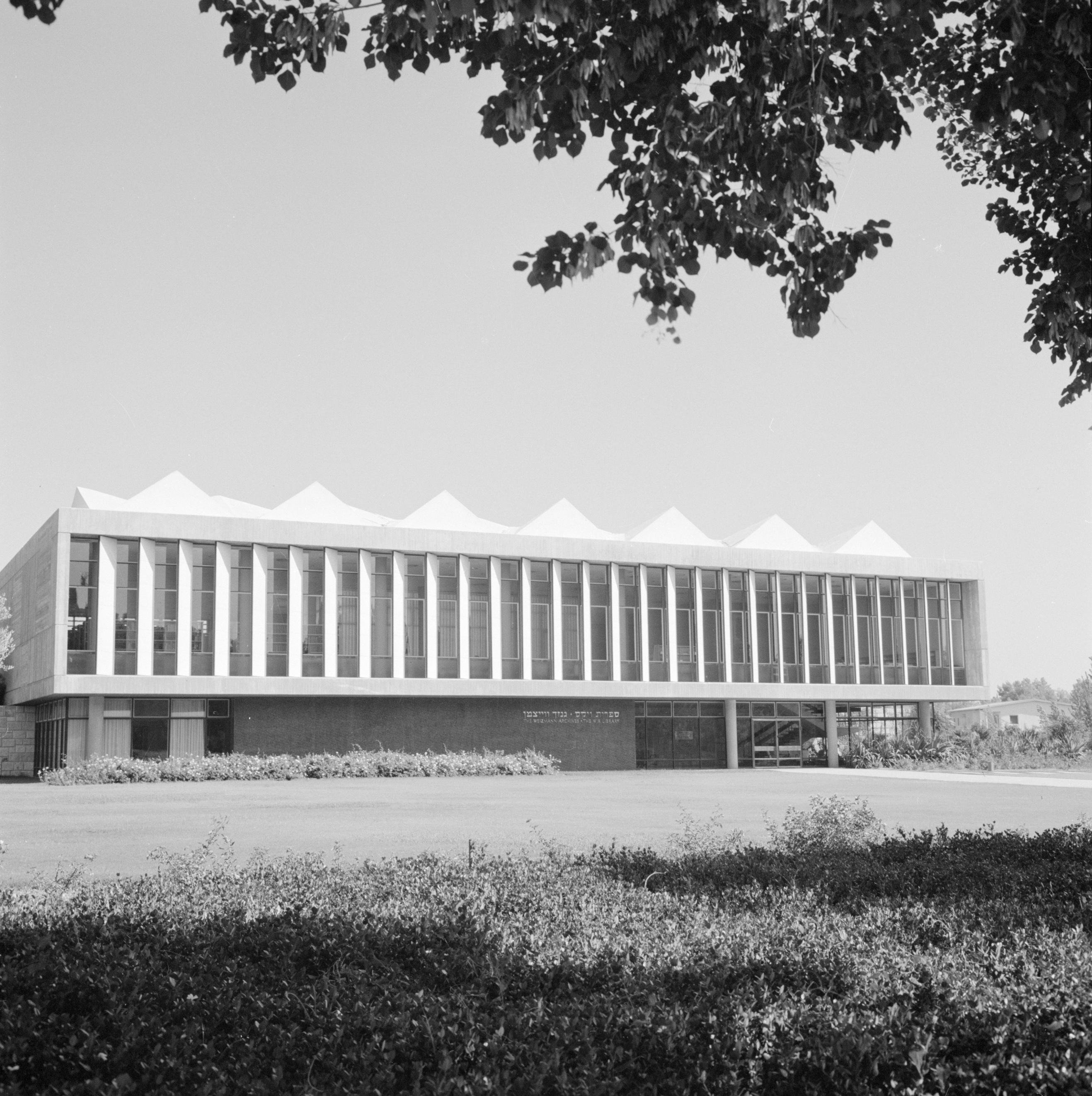
Wix Library at the Weizmann Institute, Rehovot

He designed the municipal auditorium in Kfar Saba, the Gan Ha'ir Tower of Tel Aviv, and several buildings of the Weizmann Institute of Science, of which the Wix Library (1957) constitutes one of the works he's best known for. His other Weizmann Institute projects are the Jacob Ziskind Building (together with Israel Dicker and Uriel Schiller, 1947, according to a sketch by Erich Mendelsohn), the Isaac Wolfson Building (1953), the Modernist-Brutalist Conference Center (1958), the Charles Clore International House (with Nissan Canaan, 1963), and the Stone Administration Building (with Nissan Canaan, 1966).

After the first Weizmann Institute projects, El-Hanani went on to design other buildings for institutes of higher learning, such as the Wurzweiler Central Library of the Bar-Ilan University (with Nissan Canaan, 1967).

=== Other design work ===
Apart from stage design, Elhanani also worked in the fields of graphic design, sculpture, and typography.

The Russian avant-garde style can be easily recognised in his work for the Hebrew-language monthly youth magazine "Moledeth" ("Homeland") published in the 1920s in Erez Israel.

El-Hanani designed the logos of the pre-state Palmach paramilitary, and later that of the Israel Defense Forces.

== Awards ==
- The Israel Prize for Architecture, awarded to El-Hanani in 1973
- The Elhanani Prize for Integration of Art and Architecture, named for him and awarded by his family and the Yehoshua Rabinowitz Fund

== Personal life ==
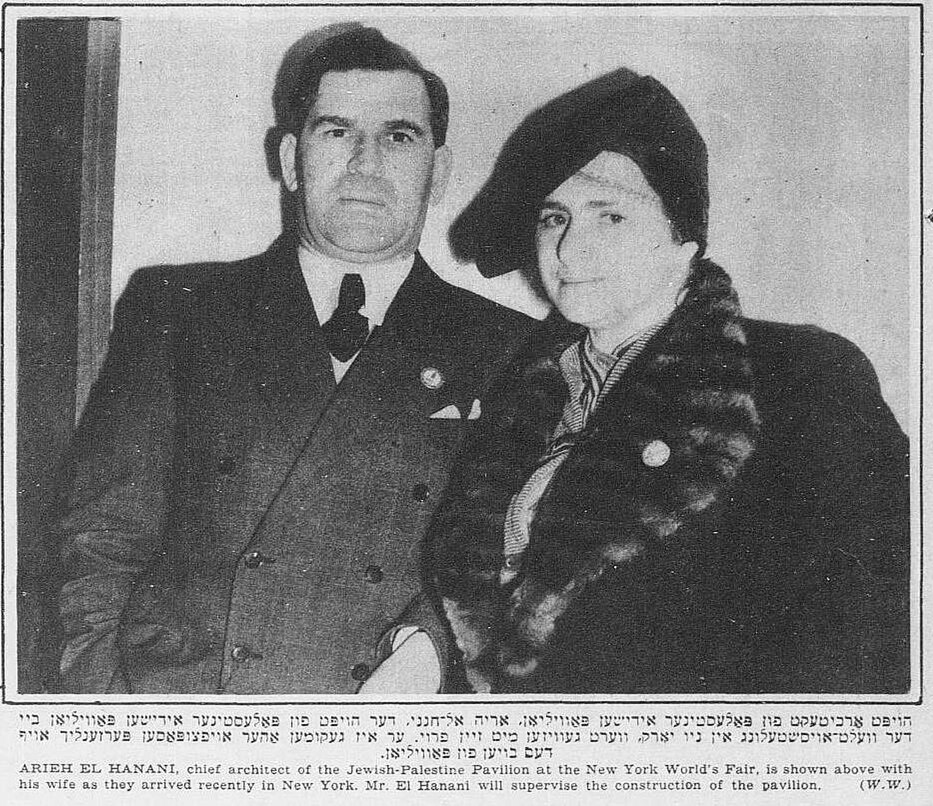
El-Hanani with his wife Sara in 1939

El-Hanani was married to Sara with whom he had two children including a daughter, Michal (later Michal Golan).
