= International Convention Center (Jerusalem) =

Concert hall and convention center in Jerusalem

- Merkaz HaKongresim HaBeinLeumi
- Binyanei HaUma
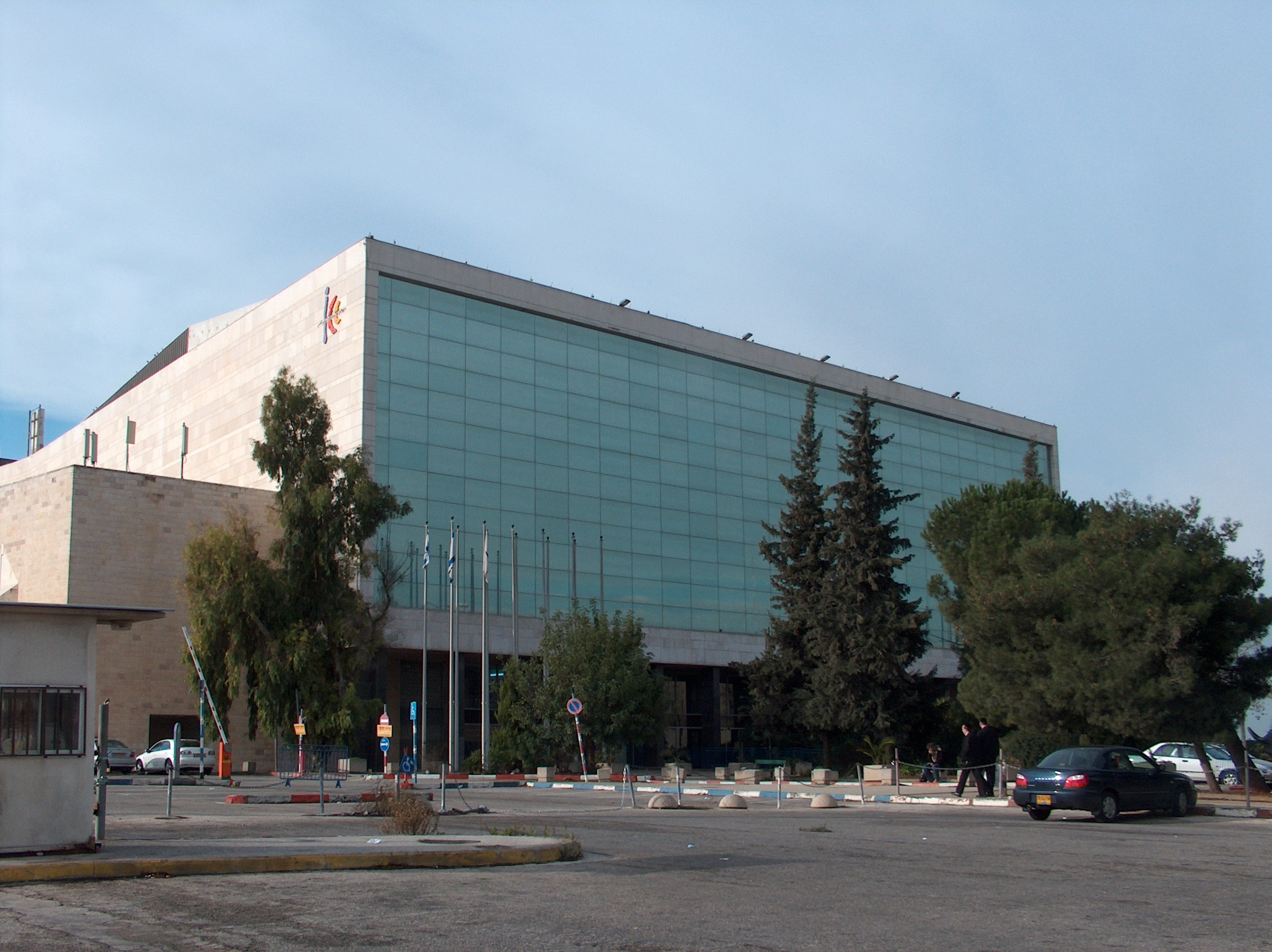
- ICC in January 2006
- Interactive map of International Convention Center
- Location: Givat Ram, Jerusalem, Israel
- Coordinates: 31.7862°N 35.2027°E
- Owner: Jewish Agency for Israel
- Capacity: 3,104 (auditorium)

Construction
- Built: 1950–63
- Opened: 1956
- Architect: Zeev Rechter

Website
- ICC.co.il

The International Convention Center (Hebrew: מרכז הקונגרסים הבינלאומי, Merkaz HaKongresim HaBeinLeumi), commonly known as Binyanei HaUma (Hebrew: בנייני האומה, lit. 'Buildings of the nation'), is a concert hall and convention center in Giv'at Ram in Jerusalem, Israel.

== History ==
Binyanei Ha'Uma was first envisioned by Alexander Ezer (who later became its managing director) and planned by architect Zeev Rechter who won the design competition in 1949.

The complex was under construction from 1950 to 1963. In 1953, it was the site of Israel's first international exhibition, the Conquest of the Desert. In 1951, the Twenty-third Zionist Congress, conducted by the World Zionist Organization, convened at the center, which was far from completion.

The period of economic difficulty and austerity in the first decade of Israeli independence led to frequent disruption in construction due to lack of funds, and the project was sometimes disparagingly called Hirbet HaUma, the National Ruin. Rechter's design was a solid structure faced in Jerusalem stone. Instead of a monumental relief by artists Joseph Zaritsky and Yitzhak Danziger as originally planned, the facade was covered with azure-coloured glass panels.

== Capacity and functions ==
Located opposite the Jerusalem Central Bus Station at the western entrance to town, the centre houses 27 halls capable of seating over 10,000 people, and is a member of the International Association of Convention Centres (AIPC) and ICCA and conforms to their international standards. Its largest hall, the Menachem Ussishkin auditorium, seats 3,104. In all, 12,000 square metres (130,000 sq ft) of exhibit space extend over two levels and ten display areas.

Binyanei Ha'Uma is the home of the Jerusalem Symphony Orchestra. The complex has hosted many international events, among them the Eurovision Song Contest 1979 and Eurovision Song Contest 1999. From 1963 to 2014, it was the site of the Jerusalem International Book Fair. The trial of John Demjanjuk was held there.

== Development plans ==
Plans are being discussed to enlarge the ICC by 30,000 square metres (320,000 sq ft), doubling of the parking space, adding three office towers, commercial space and a hotel.

== Cultural references ==
The Center serves as a historical setting in Robert J. Sawyer's 1997 novel Frameshift. It serves as a post-World War II venue for a war crimes trial, in which a Nazi camp guard is prosecuted for atrocities against the Jewish prisoners.

== Archaeology ==
Excavations conducted near the International Convention Center uncovered a large industrial pottery production site active from the late 2nd century BCE through the 2nd century CE. During the Second Temple period, it was the largest known pottery manufacturing center in the Jerusalem area, supplying cooking and storage vessels to the city's Jewish population and pilgrims. The site featured independent workshops, ritual baths (miqva'ot), and kilns, with production continuing on a reduced scale even after the destruction of Jerusalem in 70 CE under Roman oversight by the Tenth Legion.

Among the finds was a reused column drum bearing a three-line inscription in Hebrew script, dated paleographically to the 1st century BCE. The inscription reads: "Hananiah son of Daidalos/Dodlos from Jerusalem," and, according to its excavators, may represent the earliest known occurrence of the full spelling of Jerusalem (ירושלים; YRWŠLYM)—instead of the more common shortened forms YRWŠLM or YRŠLM—in the archaeological record.

== Gallery ==
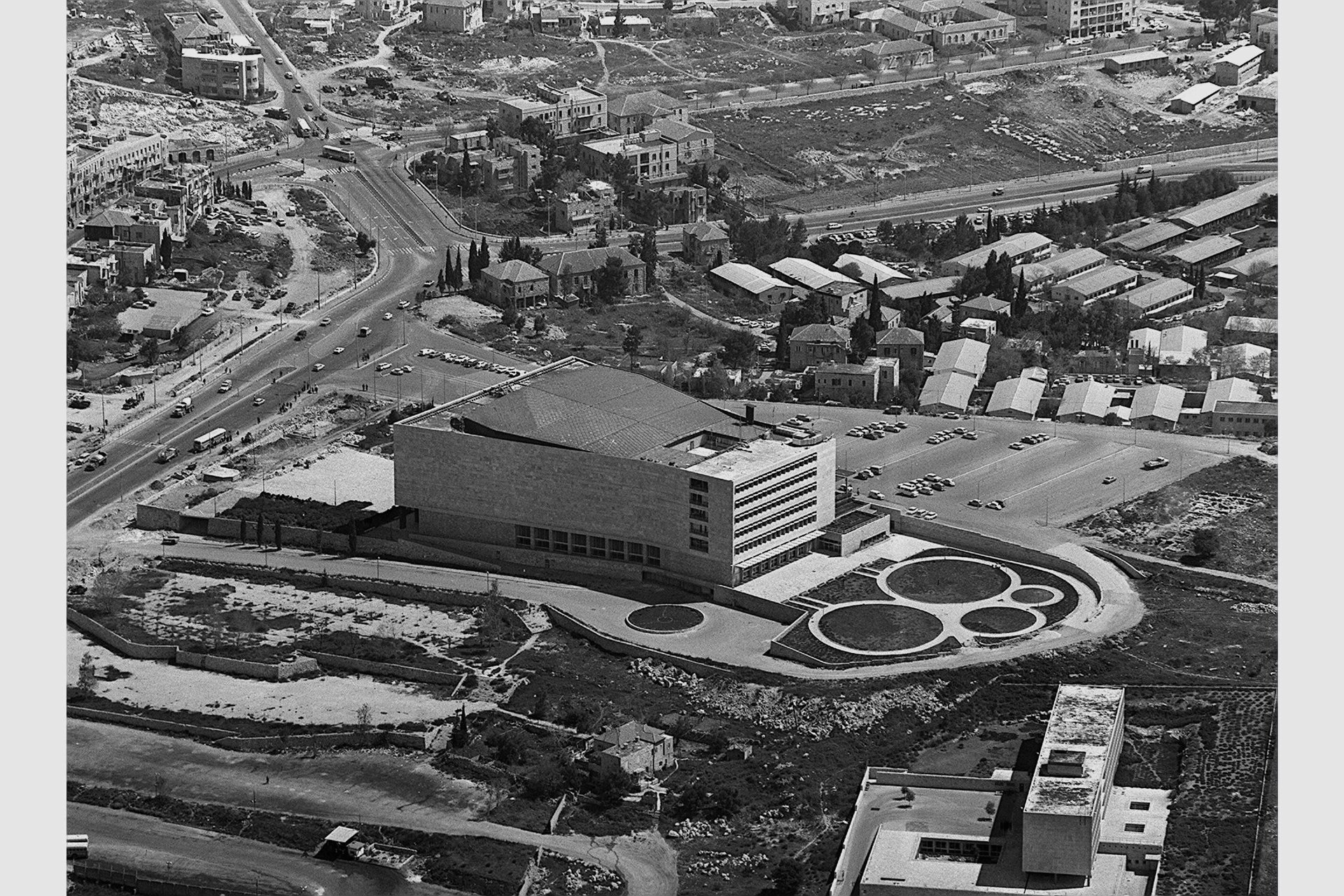
Jerusalem Convention Center (Binyanei HaUma) shortly after completion, circa 1960

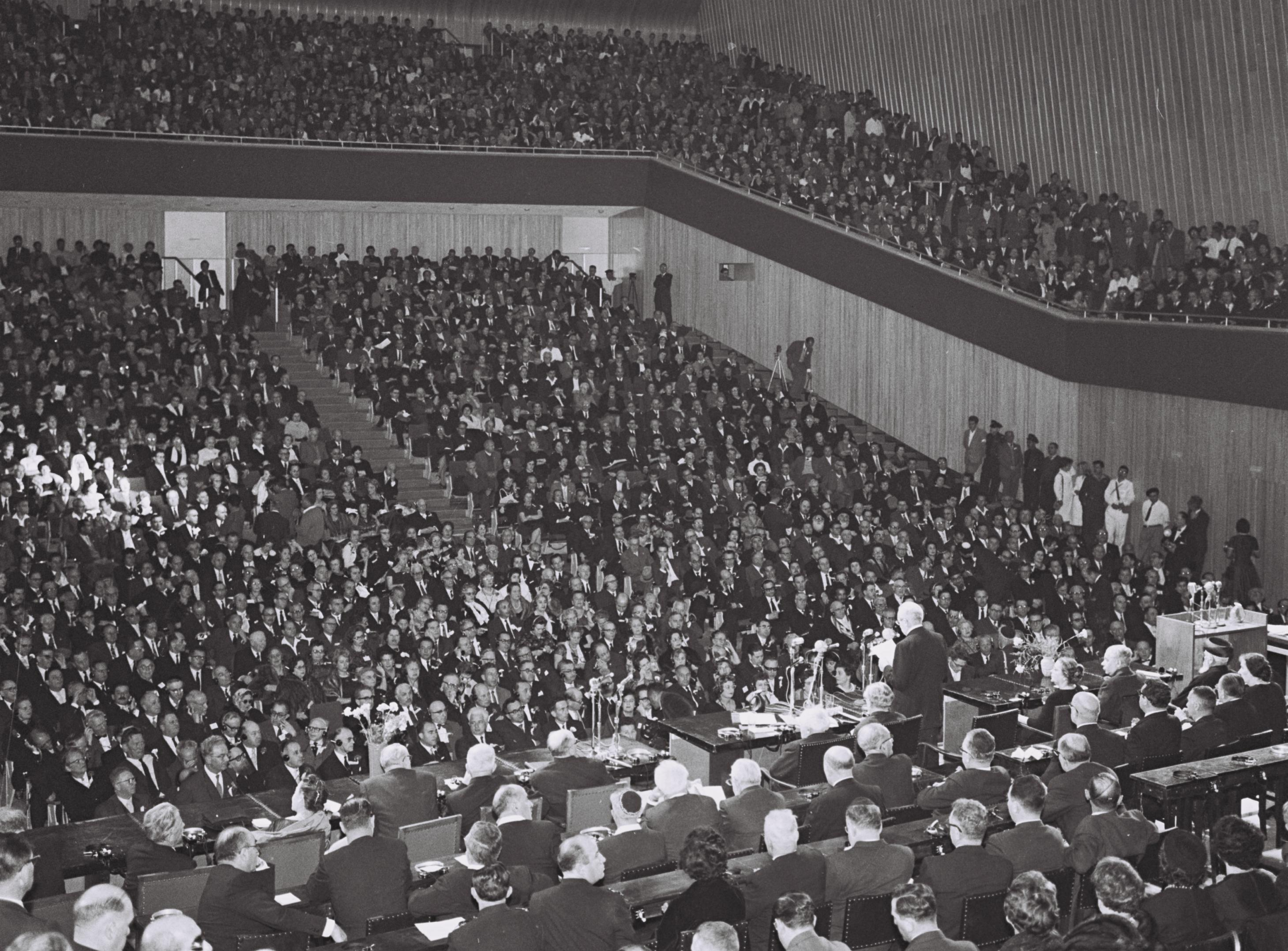
25th Zionist Congress, 1960

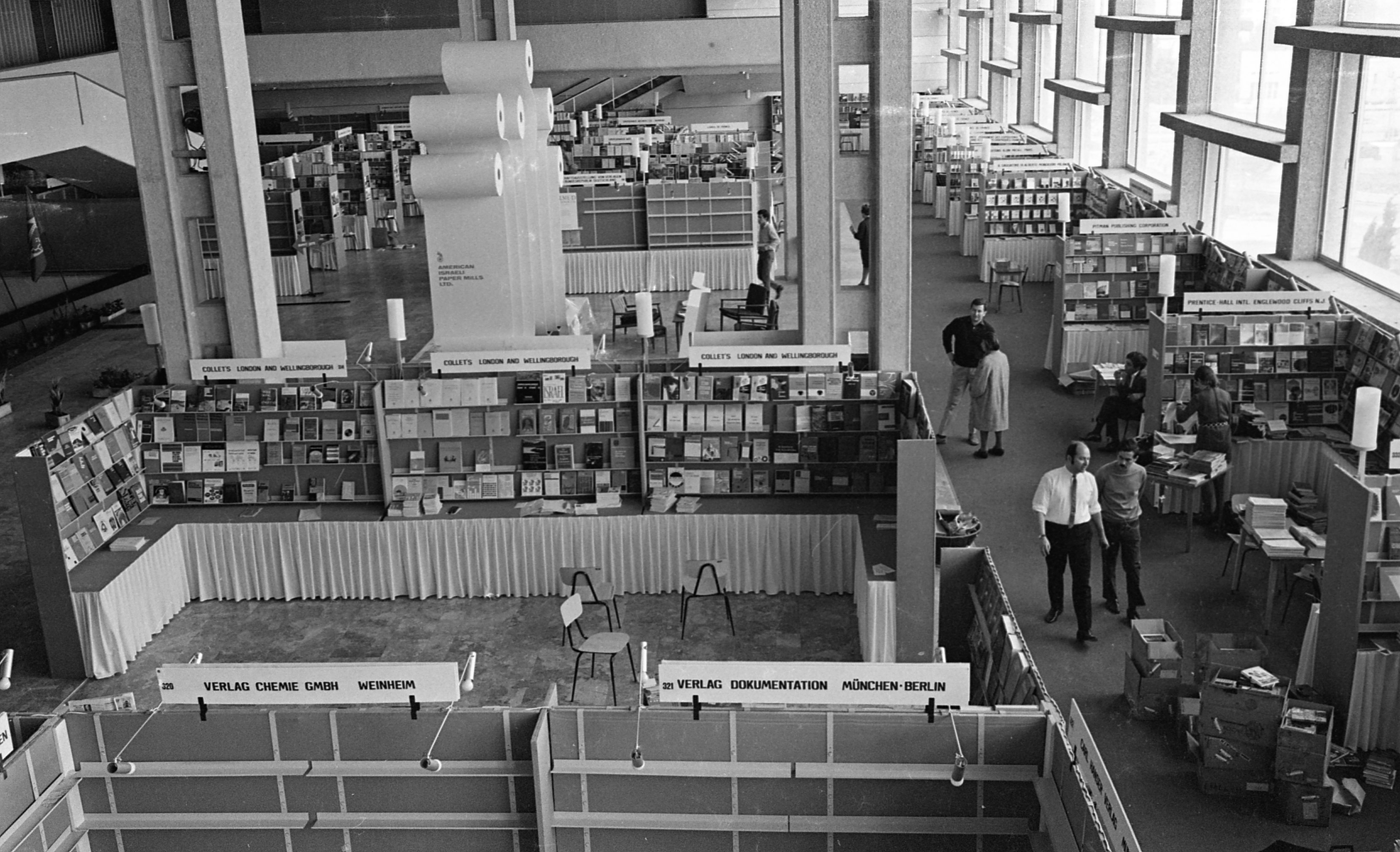
The fourth Jerusalem book fair, in the International Convention Center, 1969. From the collections of the National Library of Israel.

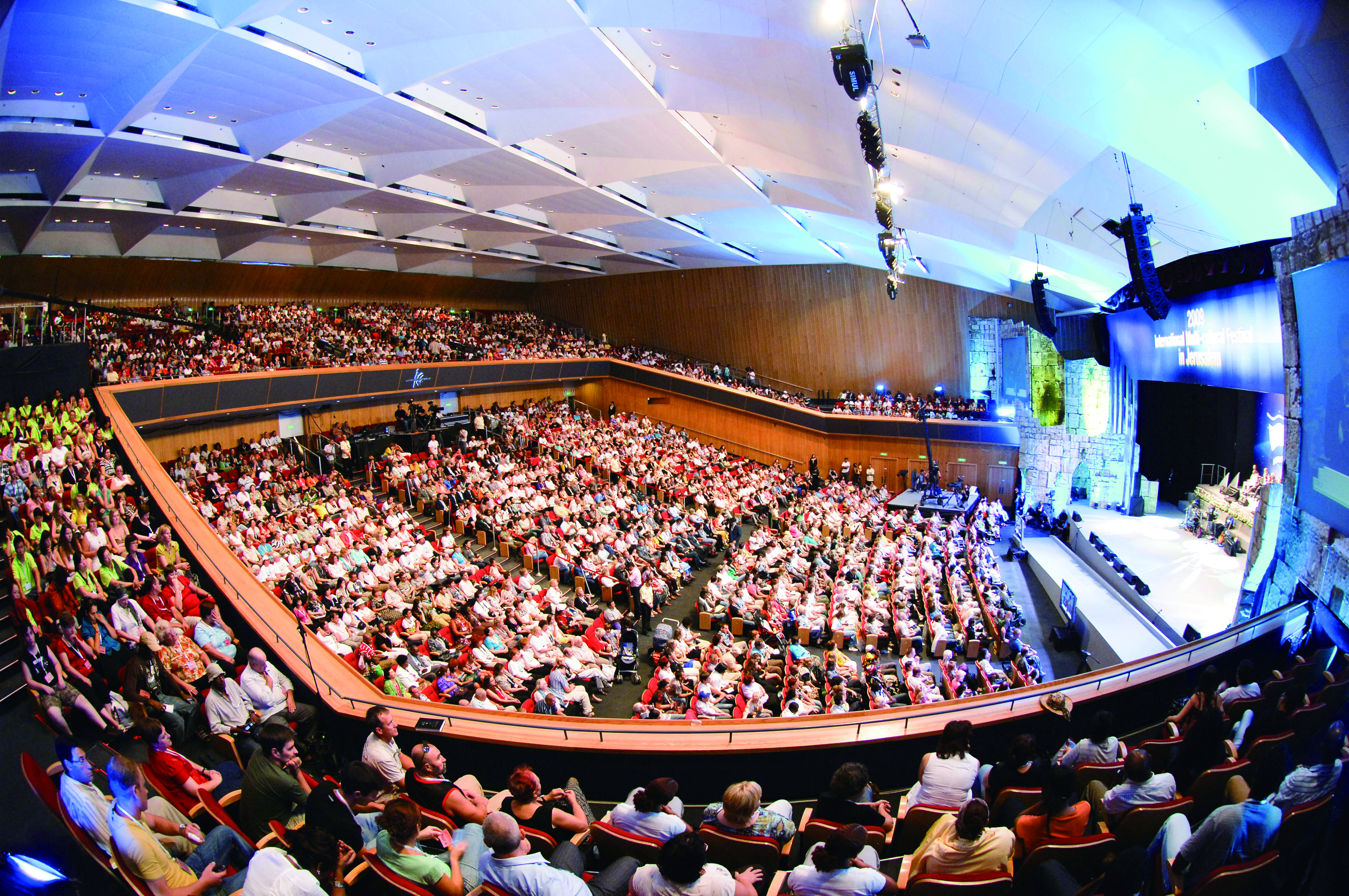
International Multi-Cultural Festival with Rev. Dr. Jaerock Lee, 2009

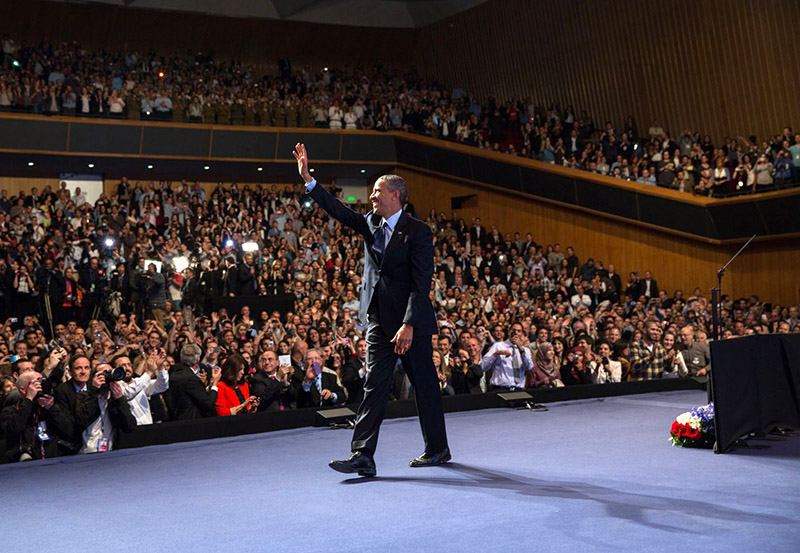
US President Barack Obama waving students after the speech, March 2013

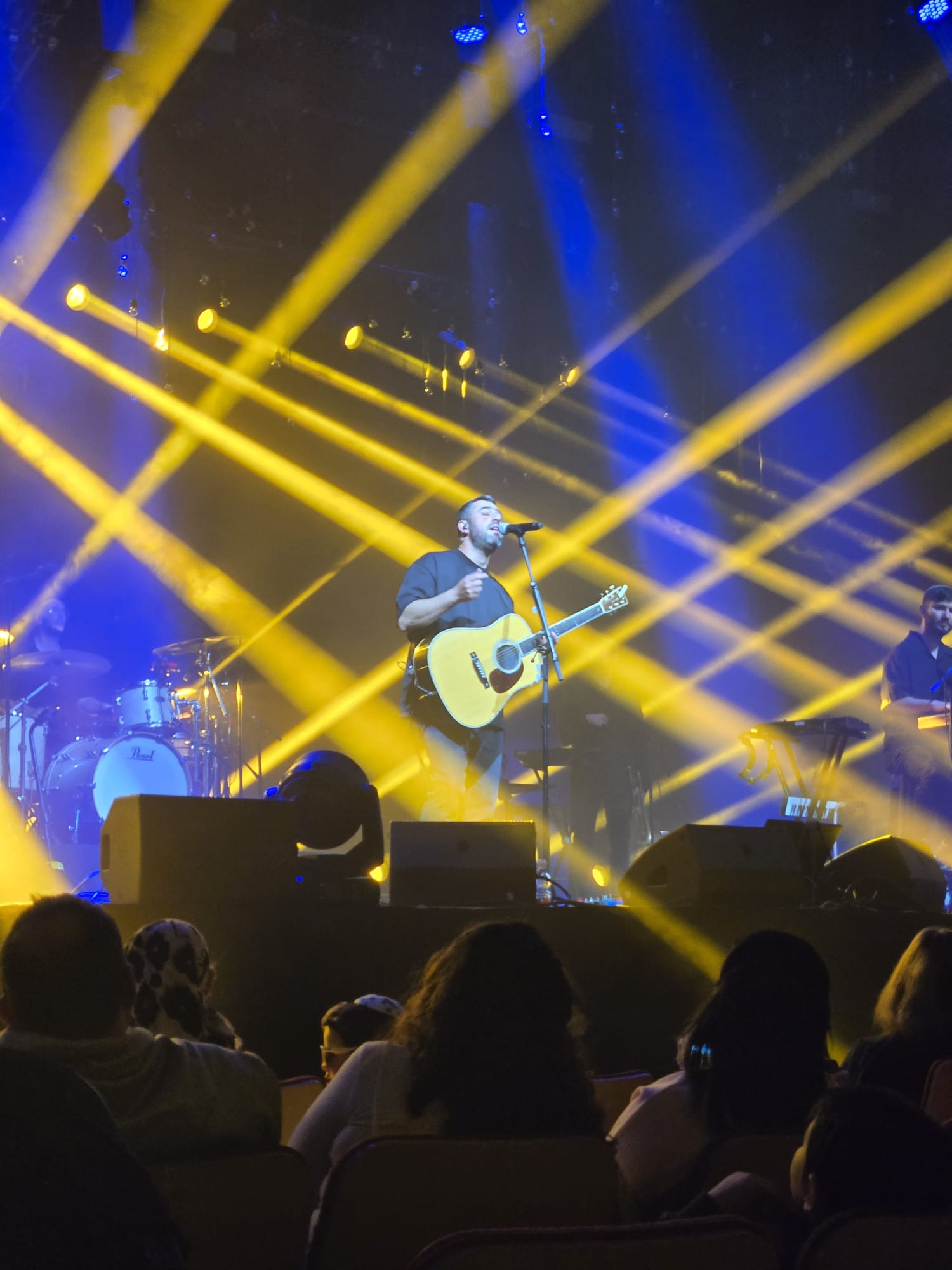
Ishay Ribo performing in April 2025

== See also ==
- Architecture in Israel

Preceded by National Indoor Arena; Birmingham	Eurovision Song Contest; Venue; 1999	Succeeded by Globe Arena; Stockholm
Preceded by Palais des Congrès; Paris	Eurovision Song Contest; Venue; 1979	Succeeded by Congresgebouw; The Hague
