= Reading Light =

Lighthouse in Israel

Reading Light Tell Qudadi
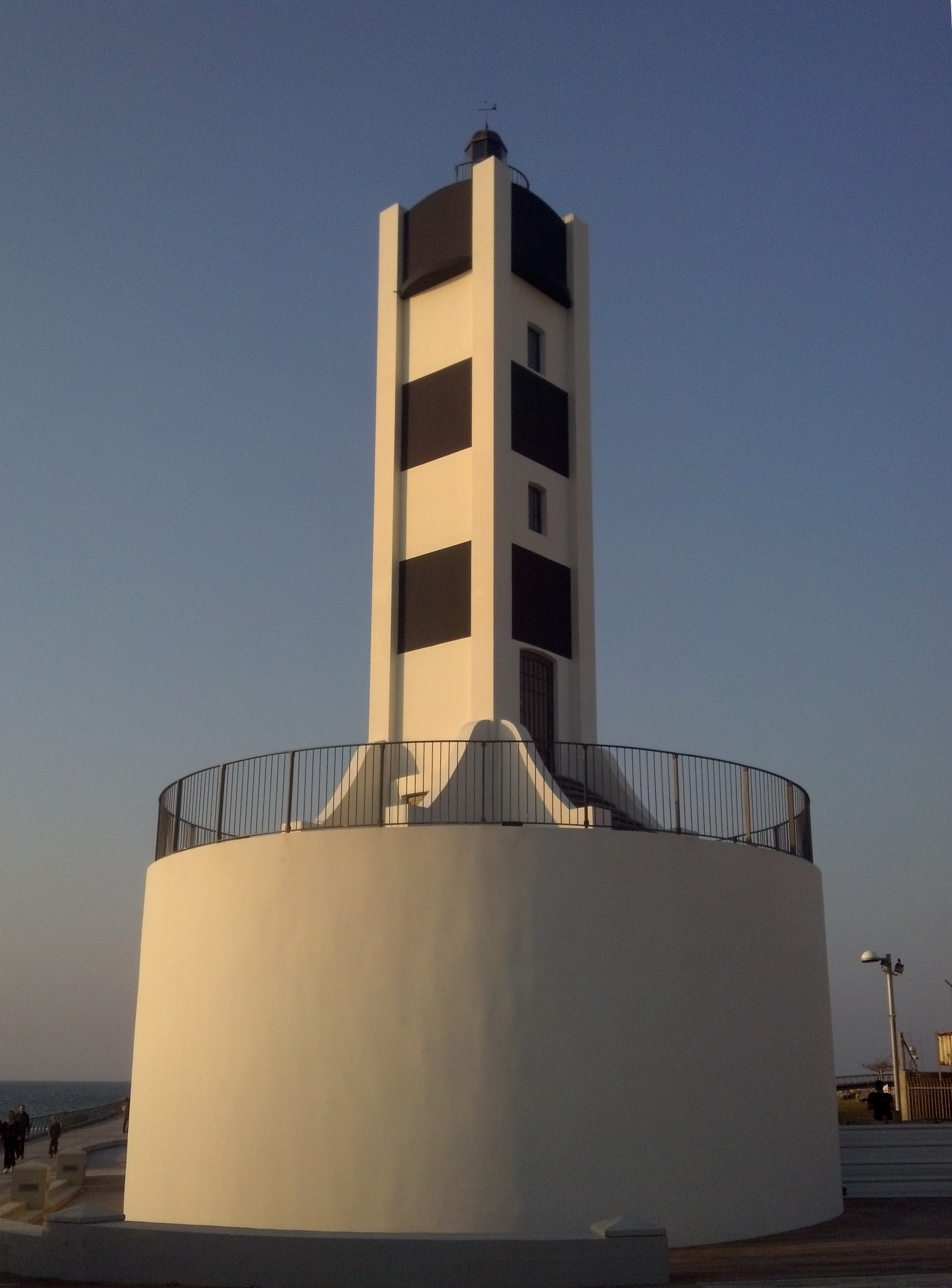
- Reading Light in 2013
- Location: Tel Aviv, Israel
- Coordinates: 32°6′12.86″N 34°46′37.11″E

Tower
- Constructed: 1934
- Foundation: cylindrical stone basement
- Construction: concrete tower
- Height: 17 metres (56 ft)
- Shape: square tower, lantern removed
- Markings: formerly: black and white checkerboard now: concrete
- Heritage: heritage site in Israel

Light
- First lit: 1935
- Deactivated: 1965
- Characteristic: Morse "A", two flashes, one long and one short, every 7s

Reading Light (Hebrew: מגדלור רדינג), also known as Tell Qudadi Light (sometimes spelled Tel Kudadi Light), HaYarkon Light, Auja Light and Tel Aviv Light, is an inactive lighthouse in Tel Aviv, Israel. It is located near the beach on the north side of the Yarkon River estuary, on the foot of the Tel Aviv south breakwater, next to the Tel Aviv Port and the Levant Fair buildings area. It takes its name from the Reading Power Station.

The lighthouse played a role in several Israel films, such as Late Summer Blues, and appeared on an Israeli stamp issued 26 November 2009.

== History ==
The lighthouse was built by the British authorities in 1934–1935 to help ships approaching the shore pass local sandbars safely. The company performing the construction was a French company, assisted by Arab locals.

During its construction, a tell was found, and was named Tell Qudadi. The tell was excavated in 1936–1938 and remains of two Assyrian fortresses from the 8th century BCE were discovered.

On 19 April 1936 the Arab revolt broke out and a general strike began, crippling the Jaffa port and threatening to stop the citrus fruit export. Initially against the wishes of the British authorities, the Jewish establishment decided to open Tel Aviv port as a competing port to Jaffa. The location chosen was at the Yarkon River estuary, close to the lighthouse, and the lighthouse served as a navigation aid for the port.

Between 1937 and 1938 the Reading Power Station was built nearby. Its tall lighted chimney made the lighthouse somewhat redundant and also obscured the light through a sector. However, the light continued to work, serving the adjacent electricity plant harbor as well.

In 1965, when the port was officially closed due to the opening of the Ashdod Port in the south, the light was shut down.

In 2007 the Israeli Antiquities Authority built a wooden boardwalk around the tell and the lighthouse, which makes it now easily accessible to the public, though the tower itself is closed and all the windows barred.

The lighthouse was formerly painted in a black and white checkerboard pattern, and traces of the paint remain.

In 2021, after 55 years of inactivity, the lighthouse was converted into a cafe.

== See also ==
- List of lighthouses in Israel
