= Tel Aviv Port =

Commercial and entertainment district in Tel Aviv, Israel

Coordinates: 32°5′47.34″N 34°46′23.71″E

- נָמֵל תֵּל־אָבִיב
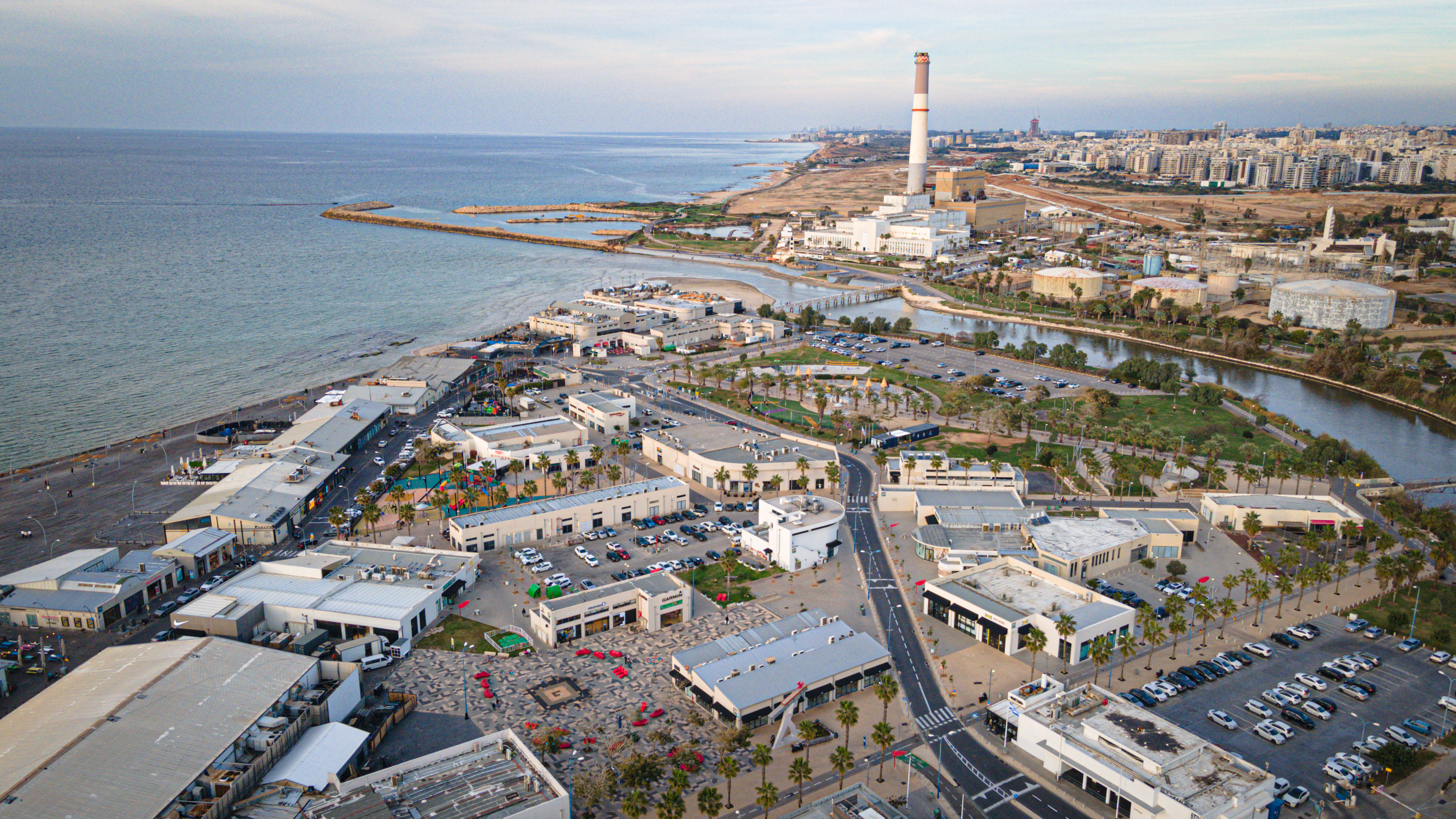
- Tel Aviv Port, 2023
- Alternative names: Namal Tel Aviv

General information
- Location: Tel Aviv, Israel
- Opened: February 23, 1938
- Renovated: 2002
- Closed: October 25, 1965 (as commercial port)

Design and construction
- Architects: Orna Angel (redevelopment), Mayslits Kassif Architects (public space development)
- Awards: Rosa Barba European Landscape Prize

The Tel Aviv Port (Hebrew: נְמַל תֵּל־אָבִיב, romanized: Nemal Tel-Aviv; Arabic: ميناء تَلّ أَبِيب, romanized: Mīnāʿ Tall ʾAbīb) is a commercial and entertainment district in northwest Tel Aviv, Israel along the Mediterranean Sea.

== History ==
In 1933, the Levant Fair was opened next to the waterfront area that would soon become the Tel Aviv Port.

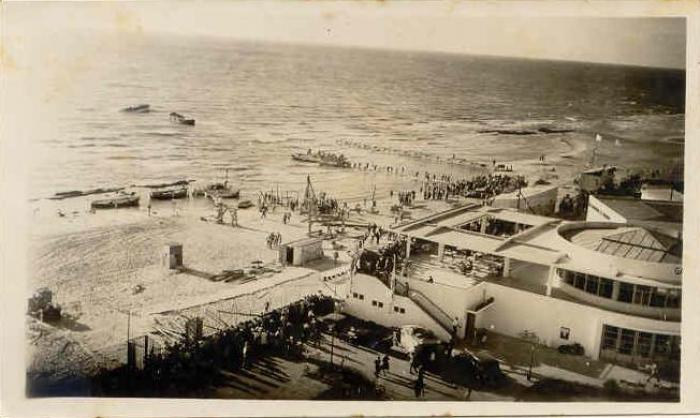
Site of the future port with the Levant Fair and Cafe Galina (c. 1934)

Stranded ship in 1934, before the port was built. American Colony Photo Dept. or Matson Photo Service

=== Active port and decline ===
In the wake of the general strike of the Arabs of Mandatory Palestine at the outbreak of their 1936–39 revolt, an alternative was needed for Jaffa Port The new port, founded by Otzar Mif'alei Yam (lit. "Treasure-of-Sea Works"), opened on a small scale in 1936, and was finally completed and inaugurated at its current size on February 23, 1938.

The port remained fully operational for less than two years. The outbreak of the Second World War put an end to its civilian use, as the British Navy took over the facilities. After the end of the war in Europe, an attempt to reactivate the port remained unsuccessful due to the lack of shipping at the time. During the civil war between Jews and Arabs from November 1947 and until Israel's declaration of independence in May 1948, as well as in the ensuing 1948 Arab–Israeli War, the Jewish, then Israeli forces imported a substantial amount of equipment and weapons via the Tel Aviv Port.

After the 1948 Arab–Israeli War, the port operated on a partial basis and was finally closed down on October 25, 1965, when its operations moved to the newly built Ashdod Port. After that followed a period of decay, and by the end of the century the area was used by day as a low-key shopping place for tiles and plumbing supplies, while at night it attracted prostitutes and drug addicts.

=== 'Namal' entertainment area ===
A change came with the appointment of architect Orna Angel at the helm of the Marine Trust Company that owns the port area. After completely overhauling the infrastructure by 2002, the administration attracted shop owners to move to the upgraded area by charging token rents. An open competition for the landscaping of the space around the buildings was organised in 2003, and by 2008 the new boardwalk in wavy shapes evocative of the sand dunes that once stood at this place, was opened to the public. As a result of the transformation, the Tel Aviv Port, known in short as the Namal, has become the most popular attraction in Tel Aviv with 4.3 million visitors annually. In 2011, it was announced that the site would be developed to become a major tourist site with recreational and cultural venues similar to Times Square in New York.

== Awards and recognition ==
In 2010 the public space development project by Mayslits Kassif Architects, who transformed the space around the restored port buildings, was awarded the Rosa Barba European Landscape Prize, seen as the most prestigious European award for landscape architecture. The project was the winner of a 2003 public competition, at which it was presented by Mayslits Kassif Architects in collaboration with Galila Yavin.

== Gallery ==
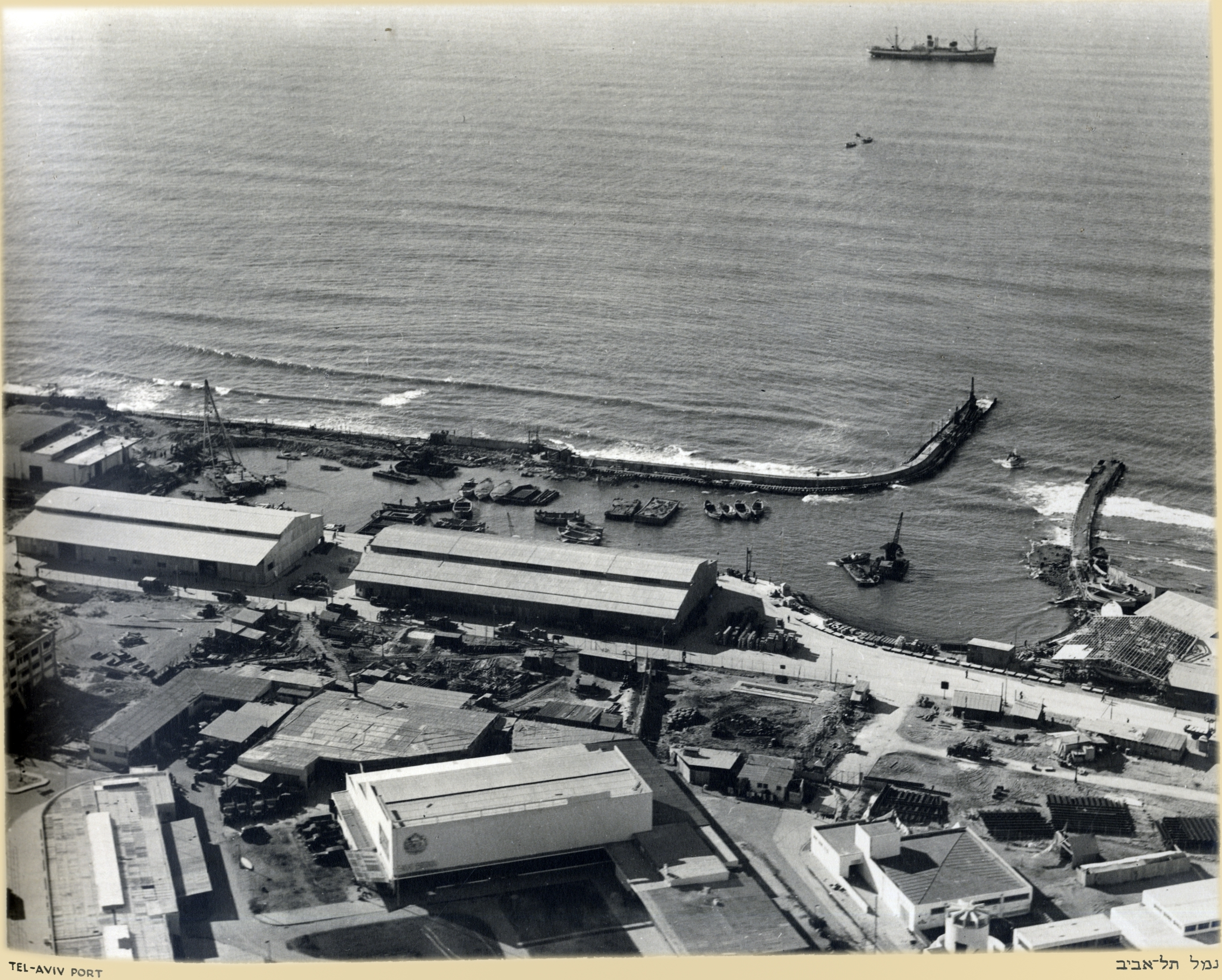
Tel Aviv Port, Zoltan Kluger 1937–1938

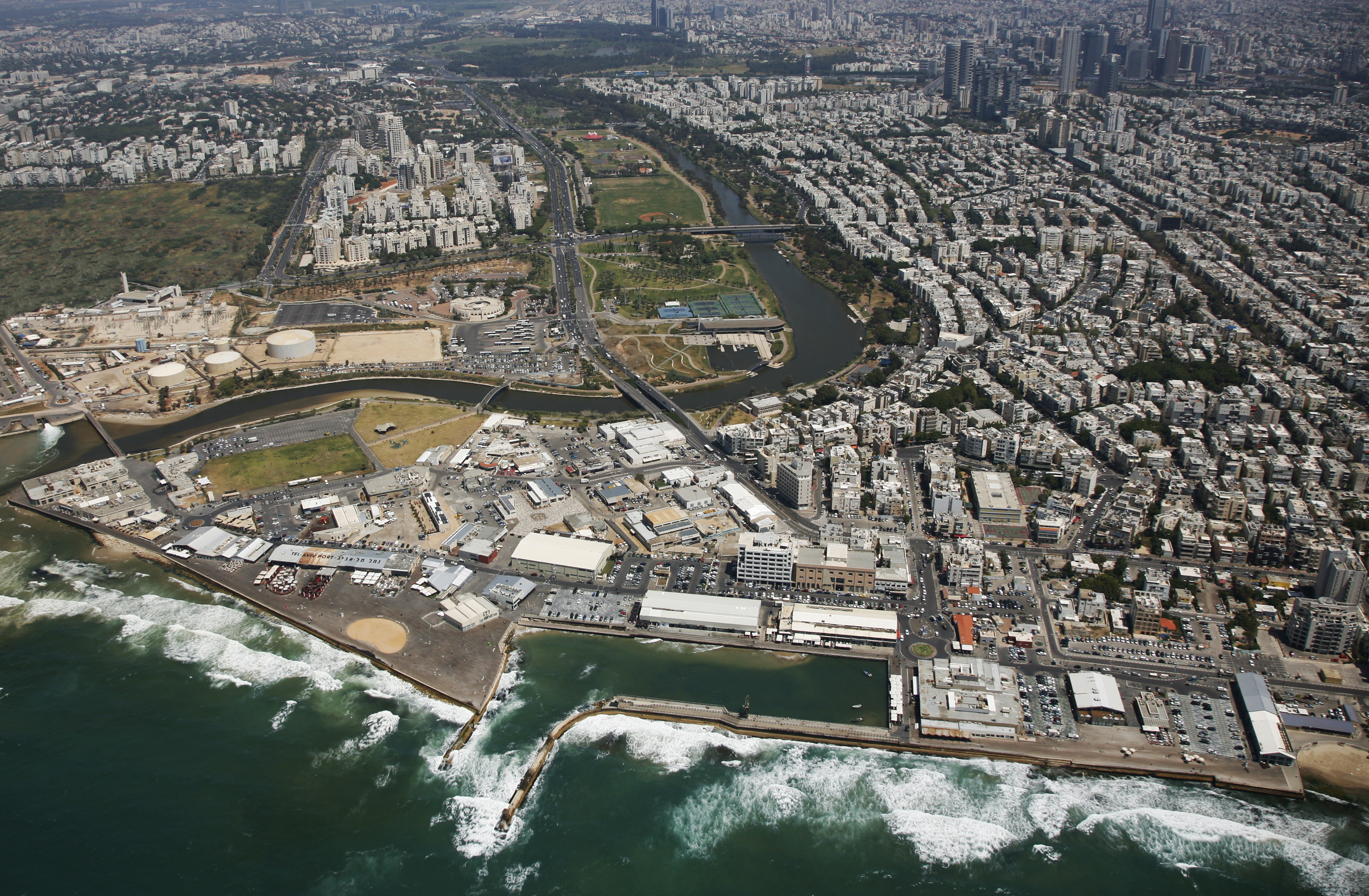
Tel Aviv Port from above

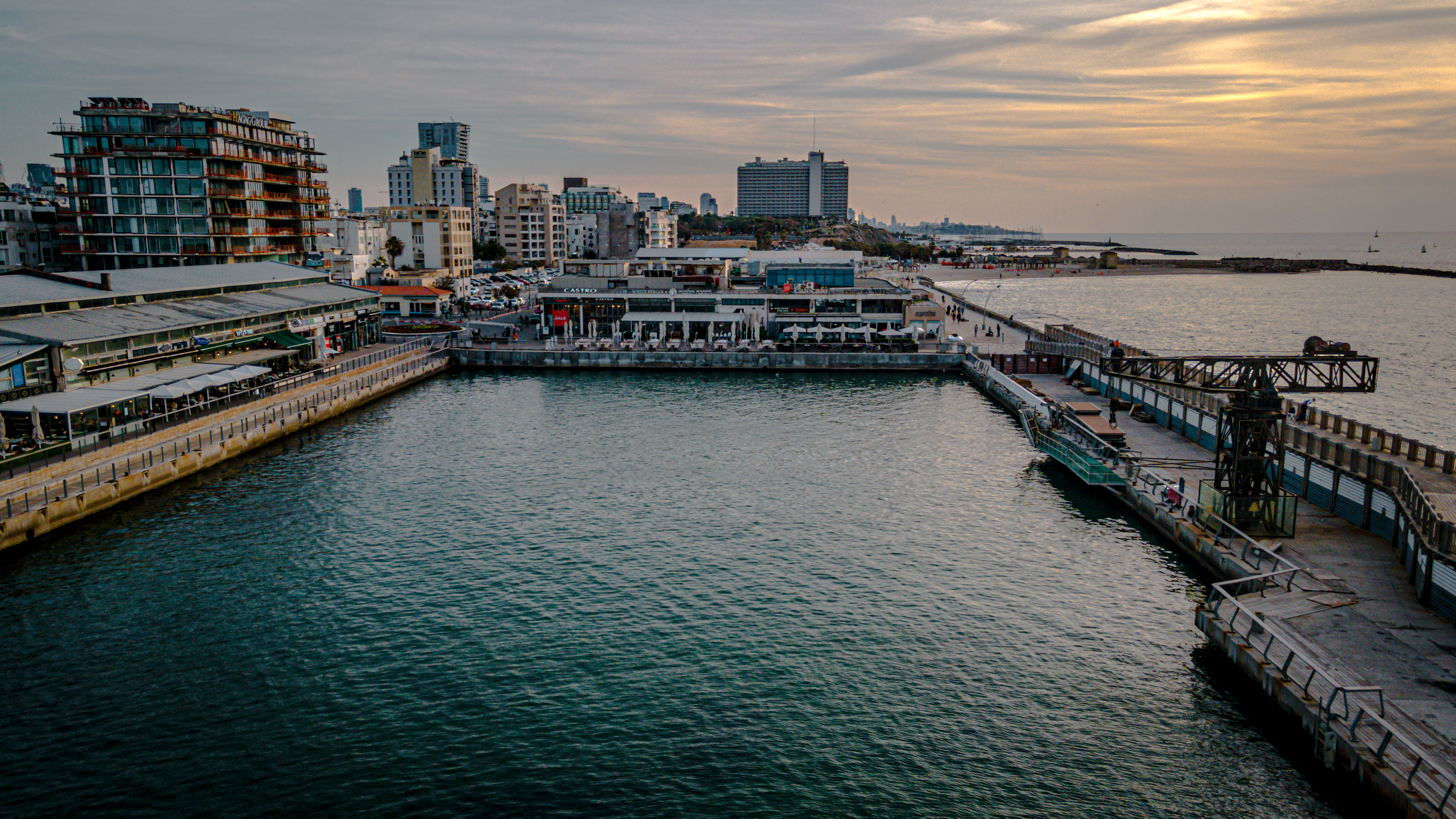
Sunset at Tel Aviv Port

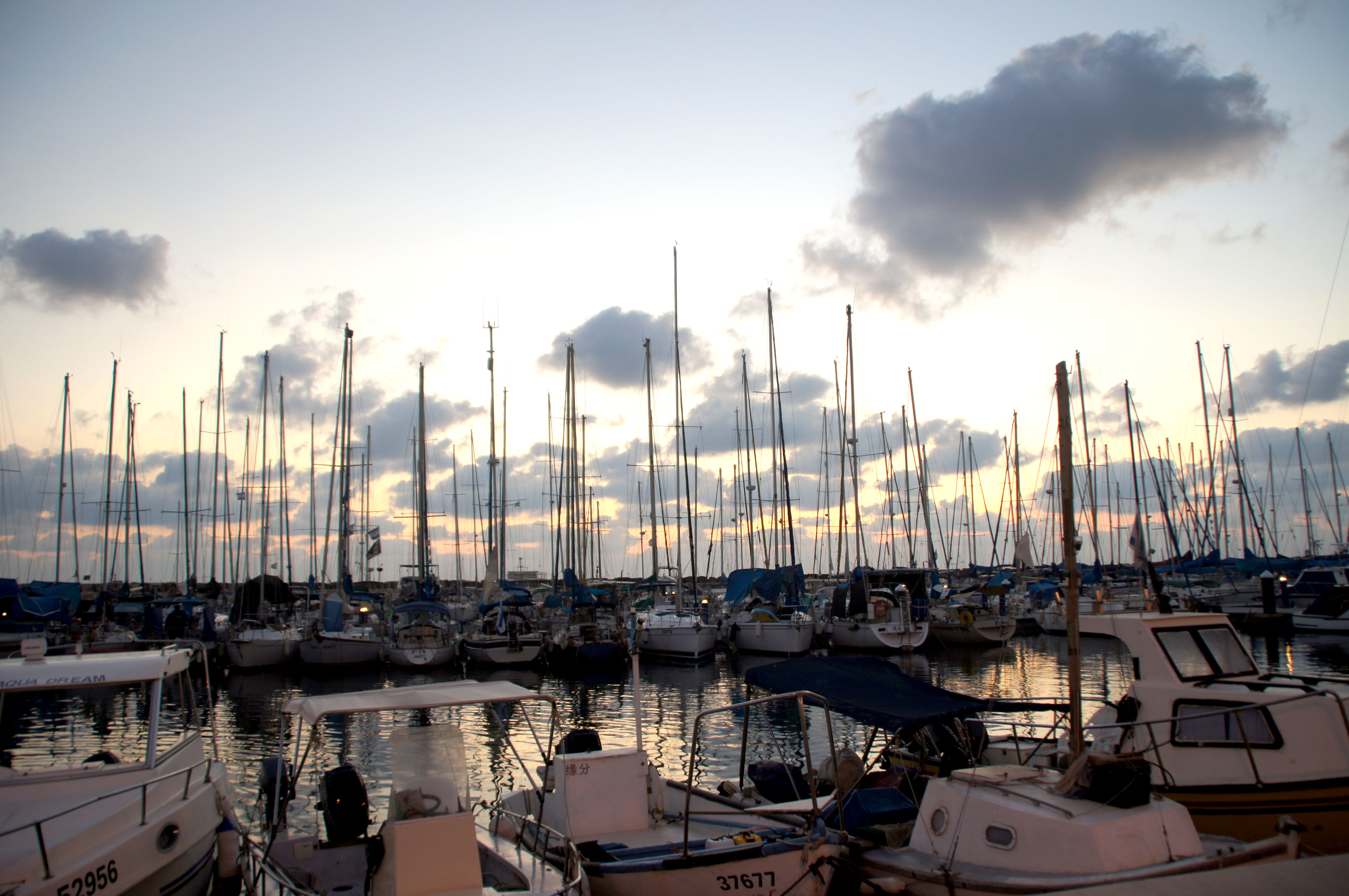
Sunset at Tel Aviv Port

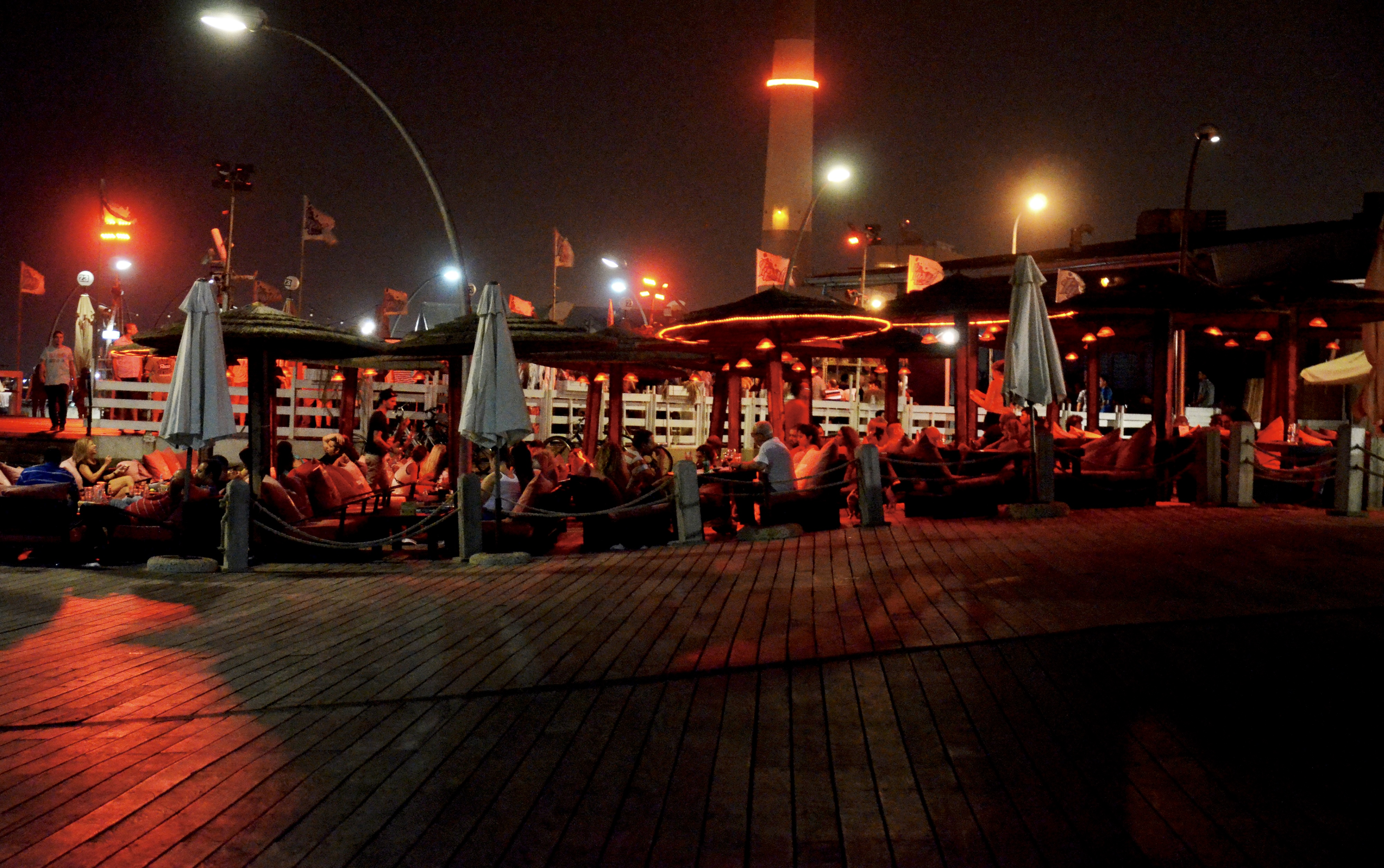
Tel Aviv Port café at night

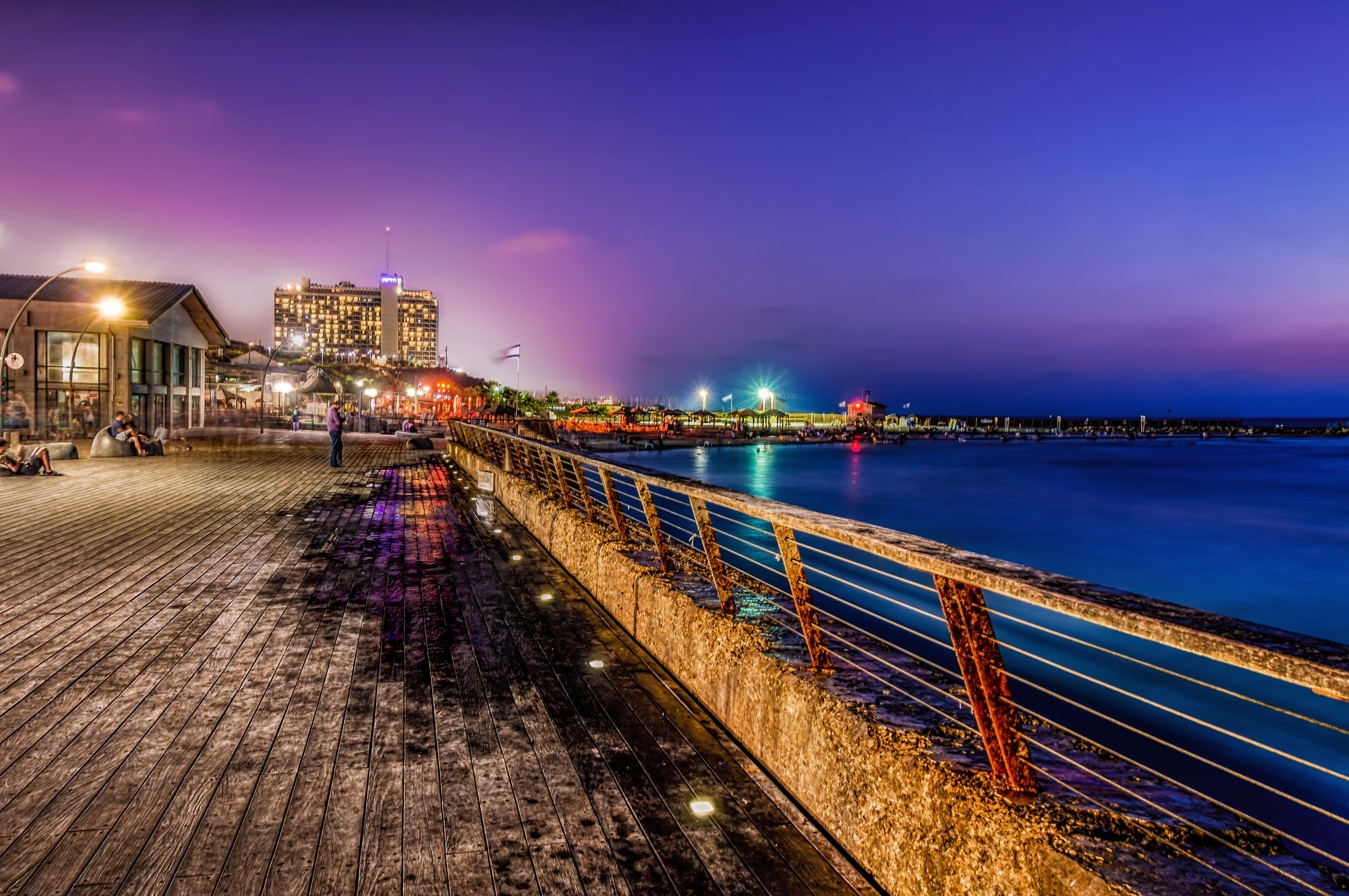
Tel Aviv Port, promenade at night

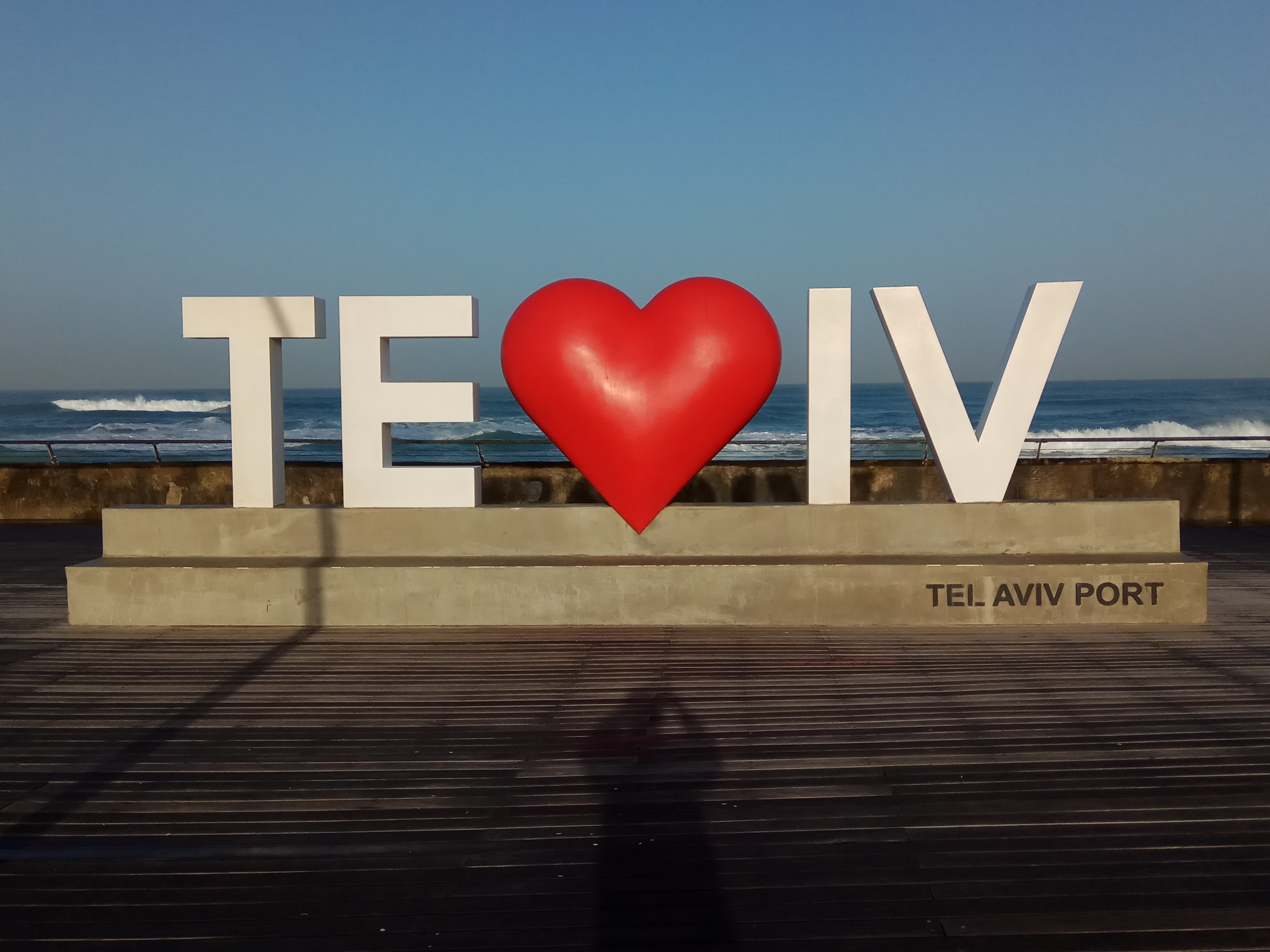
"TE-Love-IV" sign at the port

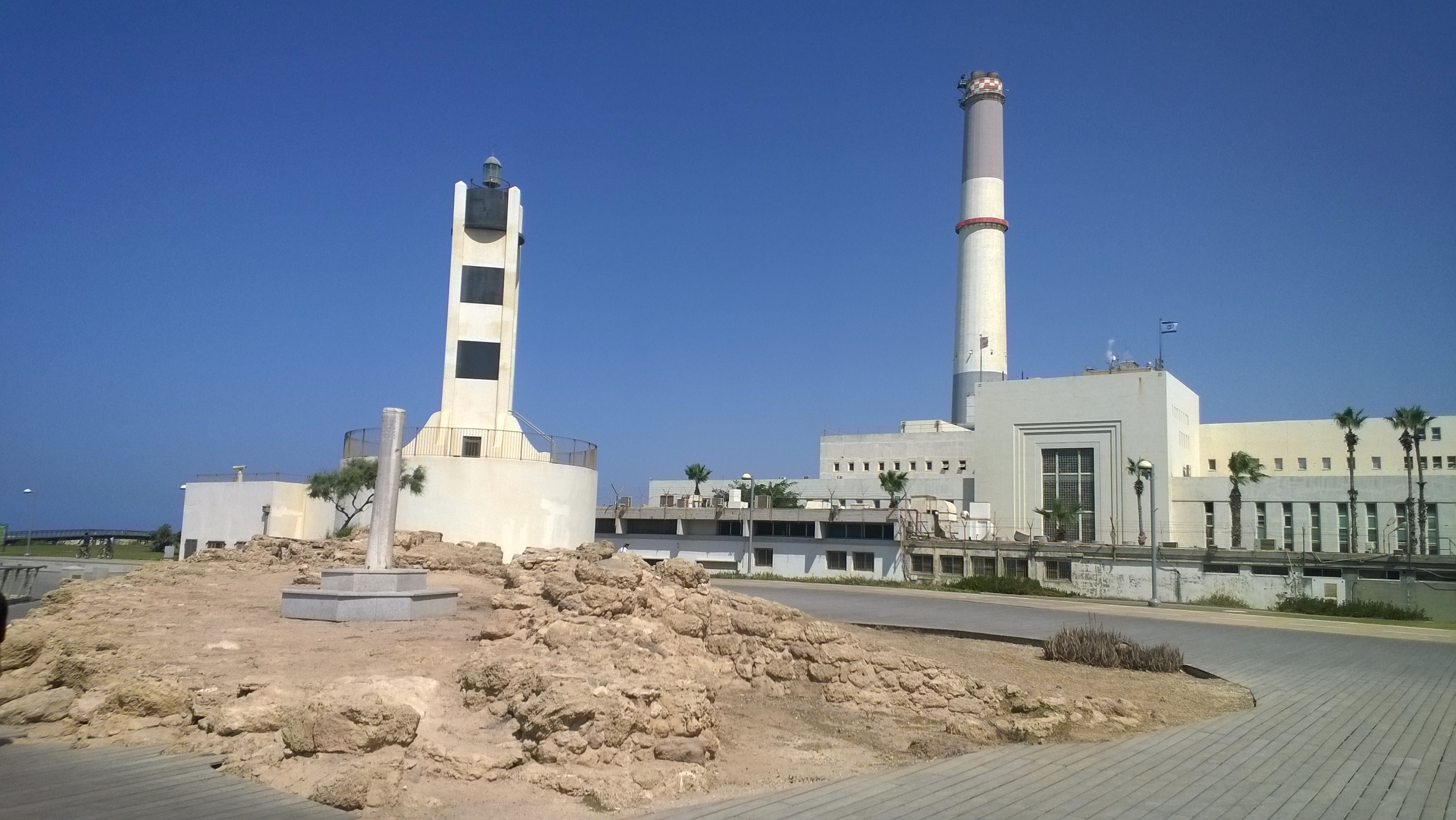
Tel Aviv Port's lighthouse, aka Reading Light, with archaeological site of Tell Qudadi and Reading Power Station

== See also ==
- History of Tel Aviv
