= Reading Power Station =

Gas-fuelled power station in Tel Aviv, Israel

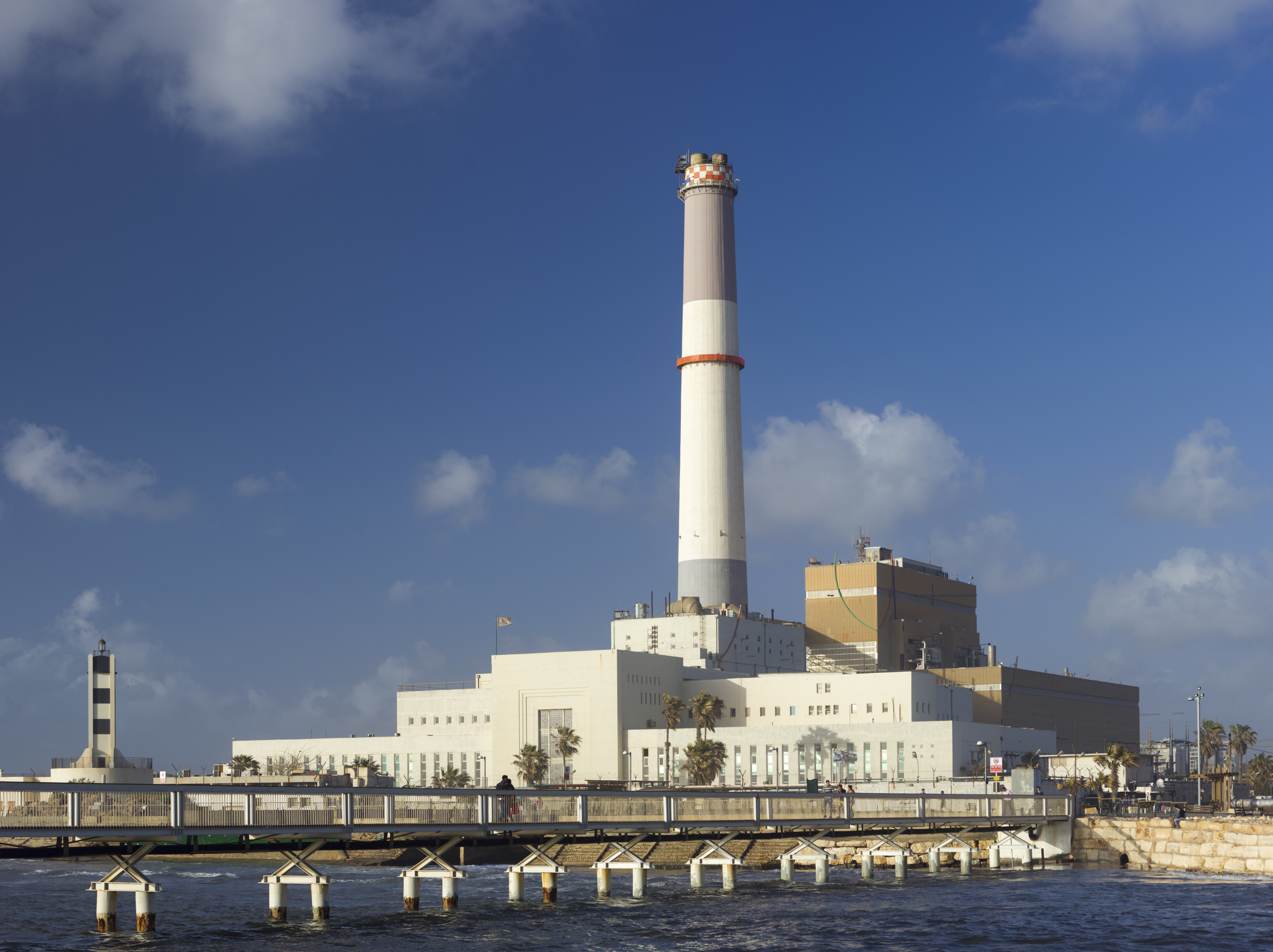
- Reading Power Station, 2013
- Country: Israel
- Location: Tel Aviv
- Coordinates: 32°6′10″N 34°46′44″E
- Status: Operational
- Commission date: 1938
- Owner: IEC

Thermal power station
- Primary fuel: Natural gas

Power generation
- Units operational: 6 X 50 MW (closed); 2 X 214 MW
- Make and model: General Electric
- Nameplate capacity: 428 MW

External links
- Commons: Related media on Commons

Reading Power Station (Hebrew: תחנת הכוח רדינג) is a natural gas fueled thermal power station supplying electrical power to the Tel Aviv District in central Israel. It is in the northwestern part of the city at the mouth of the Yarkon River.

== History ==
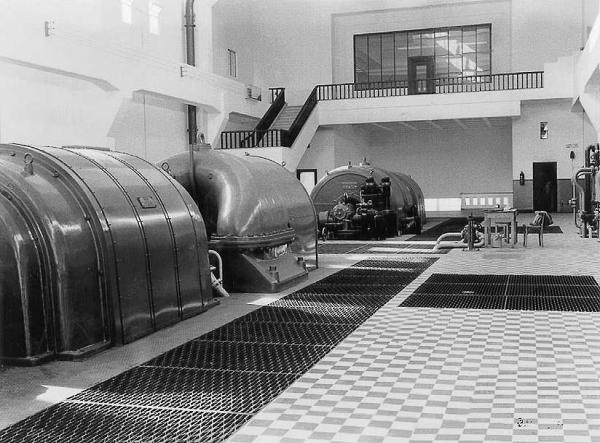
Turbine hall, 1939

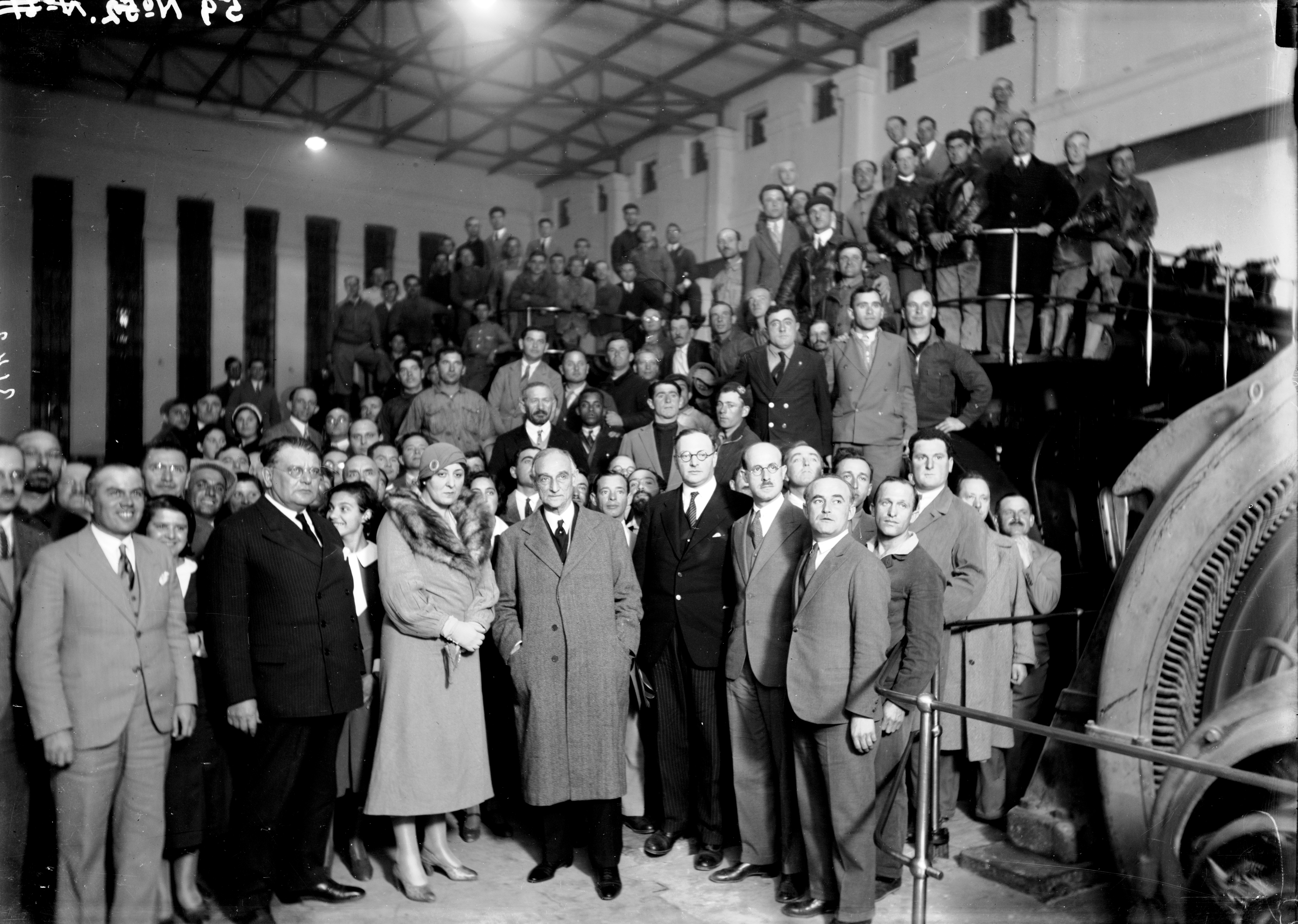
Lord Reading and his wife visiting the Haifa Power Station in the 1930s

=== Antiquity ===
The northern bank of the river was fortified by the Neo-Assyrian Empire in the 8th century BCE. The ruins, known as Tell Qudadi, were identified as an archaeological site in 1934. In 1937-1938, prior to the construction of the station, a salvage dig was conducted at the site. It was financed by Pinhas Rutenberg, founder of the Palestine Electric Company. The dig uncovered the remains of two consecutive Neo-Assyrian fortresses, one of them dated to the late 8th century BCE.

=== World War I ===
This was also the site of the night crossing of the river by the British expeditionary corps during the late-1917 Battle of Jaffa.

=== British Mandate period ===
The station, built in 1938, was the country's first turbine, with a capacity of 12 MW. It was named for Rufus Isaacs, 1st Marquess of Reading, Lord Chief Justice of England and Viceroy of India, who became chairman of the Palestine Electric Corporation in 1926.

The architect of the building, Ed Rosenhak, designed a three-story central tower situated between two identical wings, with a large entrance facing the city.

=== State of Israel ===
The power station is made up of a number of power producing units. Two units called 'Reading A' and two units called 'Reading B', built in the 1950s, are capable of producing 50 megawatts each. Additional units, called 'Reading C' and 'Reading D' (each consisting of two units) were added in the 1970s.

'Reading A' was shut down in 1967, and has since been converted into a public exhibition area. 'Reading B' was closed down in 2004. 'Reading C' was shut down in 1981, and today contains a memorial for Yitzhak Rabin. At present only 'Reading D' is in operation, with each unit capable of producing 214 megawatts.

Environmental groups protested the contribution of the power station to air pollution in the Tel Aviv urban area and pollution of the Yarkon River. In early 2006, the station was partially shut down due to failure to comply with environmental regulations which required it to shift to natural gas instead of fuel oil as its main fuel source. Since then the station has reopened, and is now powered exclusively by natural gas, which has significantly reduced the amount of pollution emanating from the power plant.

In 2009, a national government energy committee recommended upgrading the station's output to 750 MW by adding a combined cycle turbine to the two thermal generating units, thus greatly increasing the station's efficiency, while at the same time introducing a plan to reduce the station's footprint, allowing for more public access to areas around the facility. The Tel Aviv municipality however strongly opposes this plan, demanding instead that the station be closed and relocated elsewhere in the country.

== Restoration ==
The station features an impressive 1930s era architectural facade which has been restored to its original condition. A preservation project is under way to restore the main generating hall, Reading A, which dates from the 1950s. In 2011, a 60-dunam (15-acre) park was dedicated west of Reading with paved paths linking the site to Tel Aviv Port and the northern beach boardwalk.

== See also ==
- Reading Light
