= Tel Zeton =

Archaeological site in Israel

- Tell Abu Zeitun
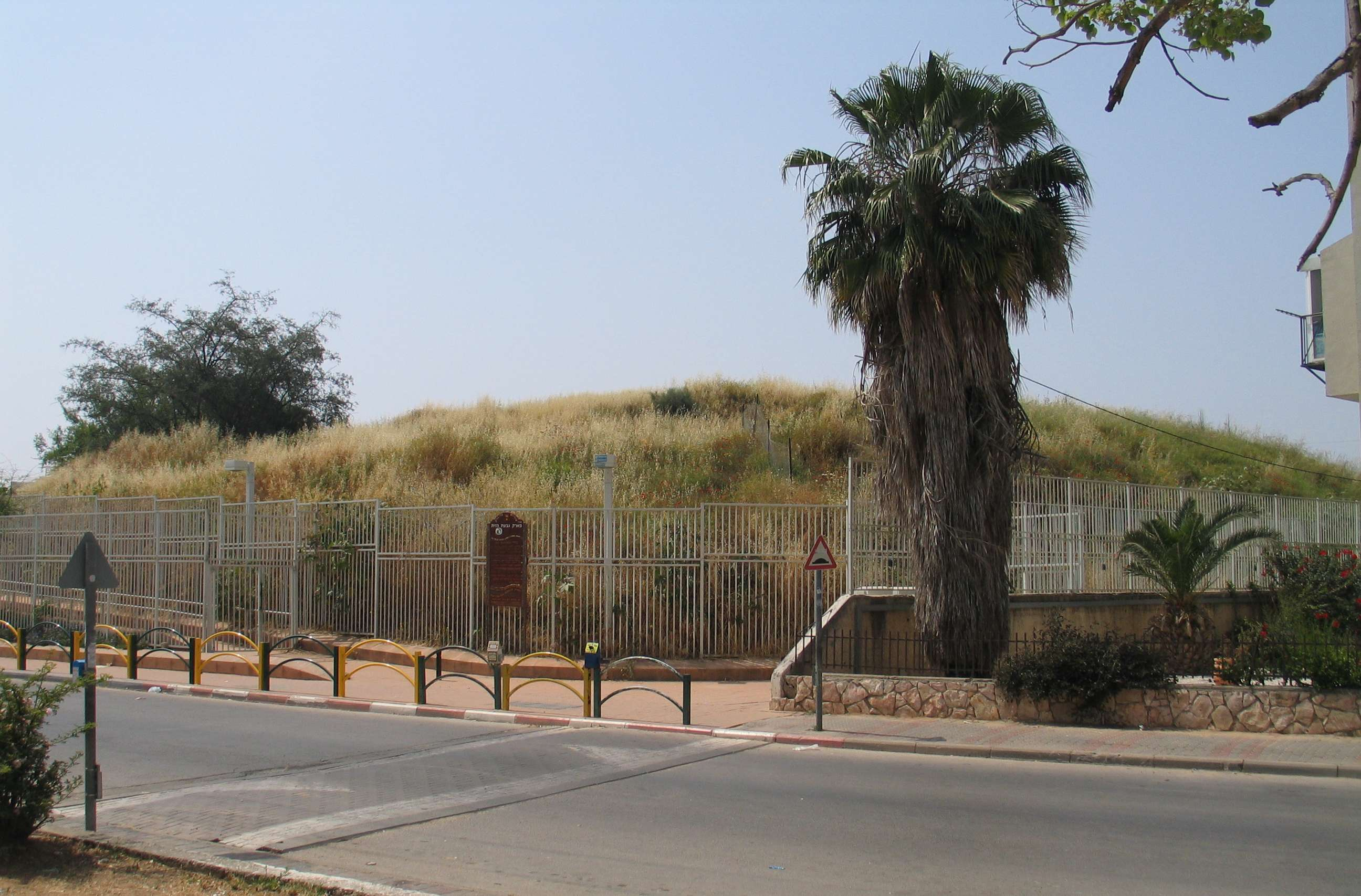
- Tel Zeton, 2012

- Shown in Israel
- 32°05′58″N 34°50′13″E
- Type: Tell
- Periods: Bronze Age, Iron Age, Persian, Roman, Byzantine, Early Arab, Mamluk
- Location: Bnei Brak, Israel
- Region: Yarkon River basin

Site notes
- Excavation dates: 1957, 2000, 2005, 2015
- Archaeologists: Jacob Kaplan; Haya Katz; Dor Golan; Angelina Dagot

Tel Zeton (Hebrew: תל זיתון, also known as Tell Abu Zeitun, is an archaeological site in the Pardes Katz neighborhood of Bnei Brak, Israel. It lies 800 m (2,600 ft) south of the Yarkon River. The mound rises to a height of 9 m (30 ft) above its surroundings and spans an area of 2–3 dunams (1 acre). The site was inhabited in the Middle Bronze Age and later in the Iron and Persian periods. Jacob Kaplan identified the fortified settlement from the Persian period as a Jewish settlement from the time of the Return to Zion in the 5th century BCE, thanks to an ostracon bearing a Hebrew name which appears in the Hebrew Bible from the time of Nehemiah, a Jewish governor appointed by the Achaemenid Empire to govern the autonomous Jewish province. The site was inhabited as late as the 10th century CE, during the Roman, Byzantine, Early Arab, and Mamluk periods.

Tel Zeton was suggested in 1938 as the location of Gath-Rimmon mentioned in the Hebrew Bible. Kaplan supported this identification while Benjamin Mazar rejected it. If correct, Tel Zeton should also be identified with two cities mentioned in Egyptian sources from the 14th and 15th centuries BCE.

== Excavations ==
The site was excavated four times. The first time was by Jacob Kaplan in 1957, on behalf of the Israel Exploration Society, promoted by the Beit Zvi center. The excavation lasted a month and yielded findings of the Persian period and halted upon reaching remains from the Iron Age. In 2000 the site was excavated by Haya Katz and revealed pottery from the Iron Age and the Persian periods. The third excavation was headed by Dor Golan in 2005 and revealed remains from the Middle Bronze Age. The fourth excavation took place in 2015 by Angelina Dagot, west of the site and revealed several installations and pottery from various periods from the Iron Age to the Mamluk rule.

== History ==
=== Bronze Age ===
The 2005 excavation revealed a settlement layer from the Middle Bronze Age II (early 2nd millennium BC). It was part of a series of settlements along the Yarkon River stretching between the large sites of Tel Gerisa and Tel Afek.

=== Iron Age ===
Kaplan excavated a fortified Iron Age settlement, dated to the Iron Age II period (1000-538 BCE). In 2015 an excavation revealed that the settlement's agricultural territory extended at least 50 m (160 ft) west of the mound, where what seems to be a silo was found.

=== Persian period (538 - 332 BCE) ===
Sketch of the Inscription

After the conquest of the Neo-Babylonian Empire by the Achaemenid Empire in 538 BCE, the region of the coast was administered as a province called "Dor". Two archaeological phases for that time were discovered during Kaplan's 1957 excavation. Kaplan identifies this settlement as a Jewish settlement from the time of the Return to Zion. Among the discoveries were a typical Persian-period stamp seal, Persian-styled, and imported Attican pottery. These pottery types are dated to the 5th century BCE. An excavation on the eastern side of the mound has revealed that the settlement was walled and did not cover the entire area of the mound. One significant discovery was an Aramic ostracon which was part of a large jug used to store olive oil or wine. The name "Hashub" was incised on the jug and Kaplan asserted it was the name of a household to whom the jug belonged. All appearances of the name in the Hebrew Bible are of a family name from the time of the Return to Zion, equivalent to the time of the early Persian rule when this jug was created. One particular mention in the Book of Nehemiah and the Books of Chronicles, is of a man named "Shmaya Ben Hashub", of the Merarite clan of the Tribe of Levi, who is among those who resettled Jerusalem and rebuilt its walls in the 5th century BCE, under Persian governor Nehemiah. There are two other examples of Jewish names found in excavations of Persian sites in the territory of Dor. These are Tell Qasile ("Ashanyahu servant of the King") and Tel Michal ("Hanan son of Skwy"), both in the same geographic region of Tel Zeton.

=== Later periods ===
The western excavation revealed pottery vessels from the Early Roman period (1st century BCE to 1st century CE), Byzantine period (4th-7th centuries CE), Ayyubid and Abbasid periods (7th-10th centuries CE) and the Mamluk period (12th-16th centuries CE). Kaplan identified modern Muslim graves on the mound.

== Identification ==
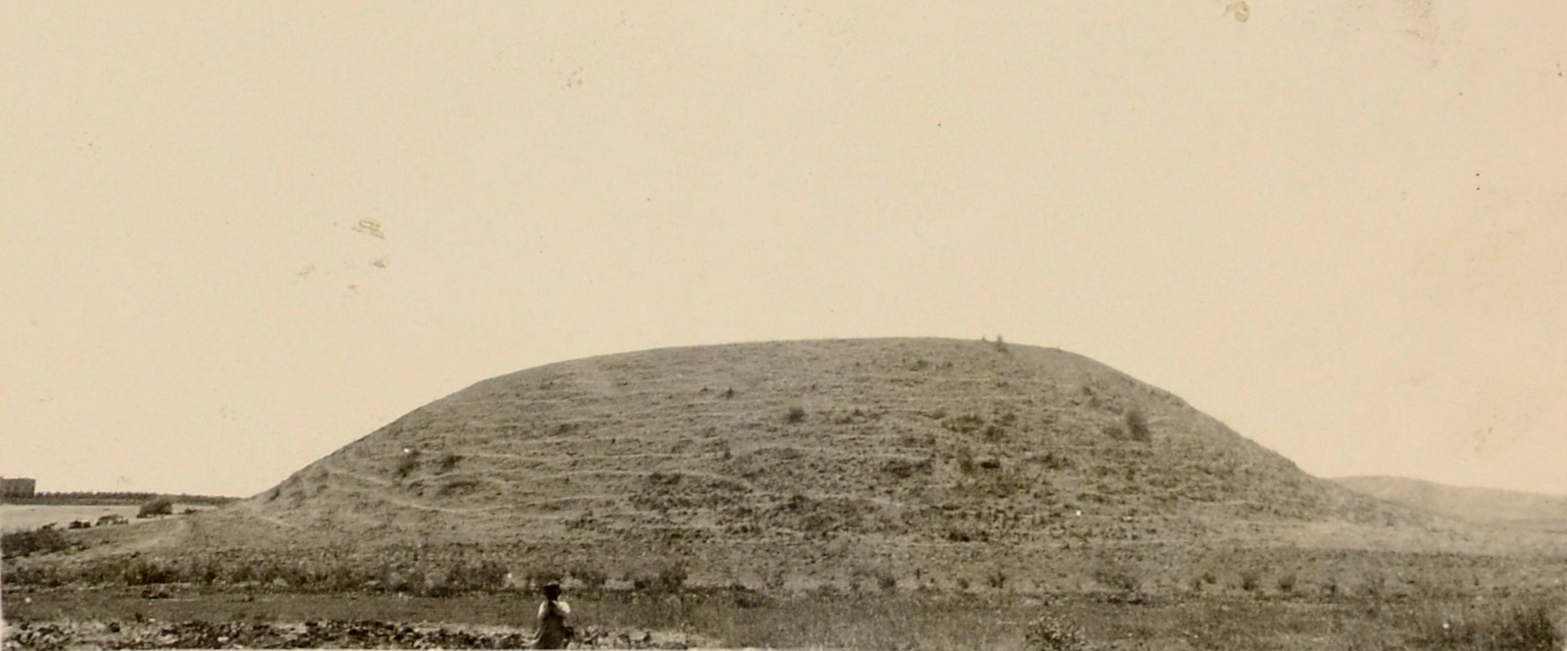
Tel Zeton in 1926

Félix-Marie Abel identified the site in 1938 with Gath-Rimmon, mentioned in the Book of Joshua as a Levite town in the territory of the Tribe of Dan. Gath-Rimmon is listed next to the Yarkon River and the cities of Yahud and Bnei Brak, in the vicinity of the site. It is believed to be the same city mentioned as Knt in the list of cities defeated by Pharaoh Thutmose III in the 15th century BCE and also the city of Gimteti, which appears in one of the Amarna letters from the 14th century BCE. All of the Hebrew and Egyptian mentions of a city in the region of the Yarkon river by the name of Gath, Gimteti or Knt, suggest that it was an administrative center on the mouth of the Yarkon. Benjamin Mazar rejected Abel's identification of Gath-Rimmon with Tel Zeton and suggested the nearby Tel Gerisa instead because it is bigger than Tel Zeton and therefore more likely to be mentioned by the sources. After Jacob Kaplan's excavation on the site and the discovery of the "Hashub" ostracon, he supported Abel's identification, as the discovery of the ostracon may suggests it was resettled by Levites.

Main Archaeological sites along the Yarkov River
