= Tell Qudadi =

Archaeological site in Tel Aviv, Israel

Coordinates: 32.1033°N 34.777°E

- תל כודאדי (Hebrew)
- Tell esh-Shuna
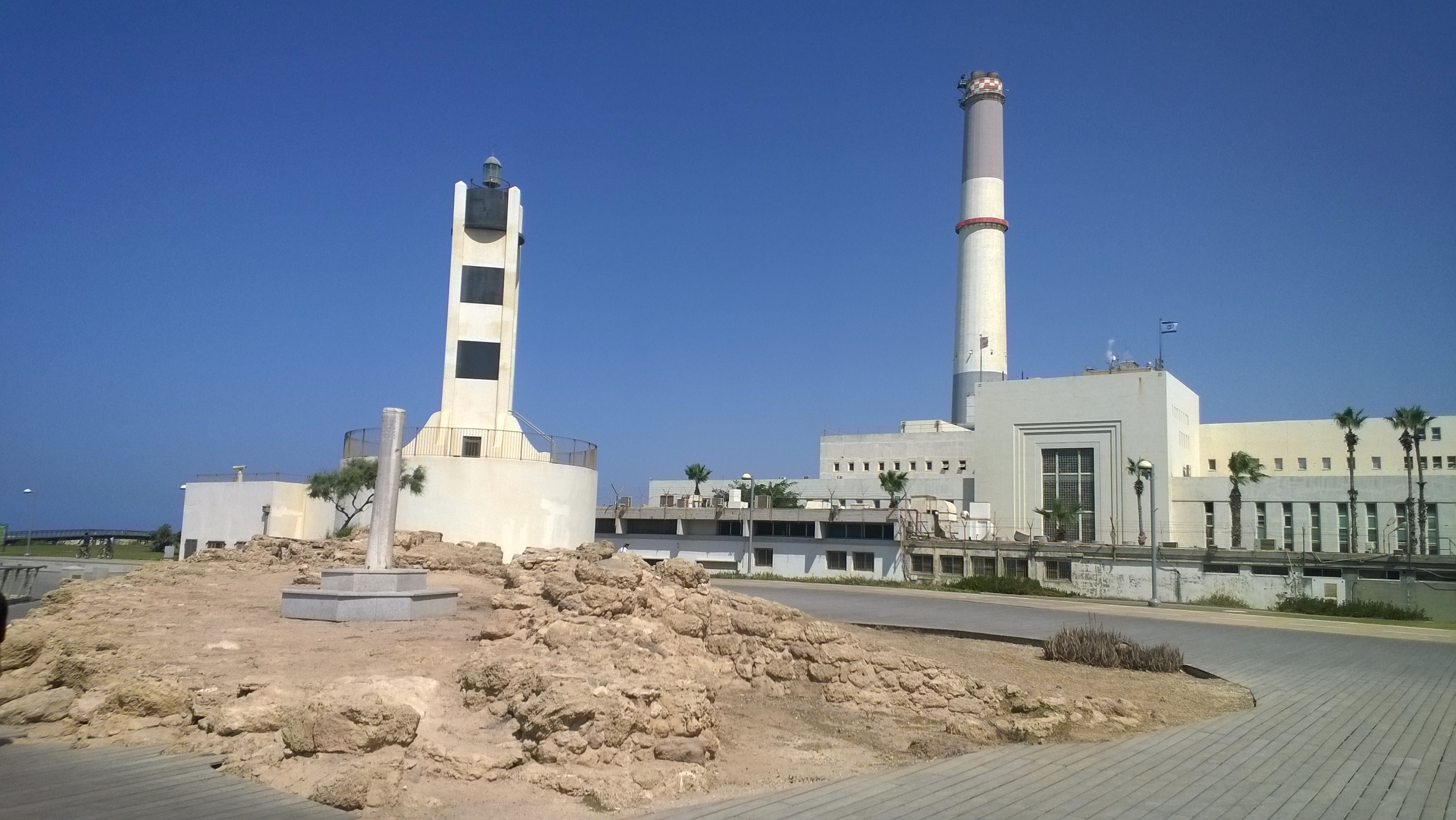
- Tell Qudadi (foreground, with British memorial in the middle) and Reading Power Station (background)

- Location within Israel
- Type: Fortress
- Cultures: Neo-Assyrian Empire
- Location: Tel Aviv, Israel
- Region: Yarkon River basin, Israeli Coastal Plain

Site notes
- Excavation dates: 1937, 1938, 1941, 1966
- Archaeologists: Eleazar Sukenik, Shmuel Yeivin

Tell Qudadi (Hebrew: תל כודאדי), also known as Tell esh-Shuna (Hebrew: תל א-שונה) is an ancient site located near the mouth of the Yarkon River and Reading Power Station in the city of Tel Aviv, Israel. It was discovered in 1934 by Jacob Ory and was excavated first by P. L. O. Guy in 1937 and then by Eleazar Sukenik, Shmuel Yeivin and Nahman Avigad in 1937-1938. These revealed a fortress dated to the Iron Age, which the excavators believed was an Israelite fortress built in the 10th or 9th centuries BCE and destroyed by the Neo-Assyrian Empire in the 8th century BCE.

However, archaeologists Oren Tal and Alexander Fantalkin have reviewed the preliminary reports of the excavation and its finds and have concluded that the site was actually constructed in the 8th century, during Assyrian rule, and was abandoned ahead of the empire's withdrawal from the country during the late 7th century BCE.

Besides the fortress, pottery from the Early Bronze Age, Persian, Byzantine and Early Arab periods was found in the site. Among the pottery found was a Greek jar from the island of Lesbos, the earliest of its kind along the whole Mediterranean coast.

A preservation project was carried out in 2007 by the Israel Antiquities Authority, and the site can now be seen on the Tel Aviv Promenade.

== Location ==
Tell Qudadi is on the northern bank of the Yarkon River, just north of its estuary on the Mediterranean Sea. It is now within the municipal boundaries of the city of Tel Aviv. The site controls an historical trade route passing through the Israeli coastal plain linking Egypt with the Levant. The widest river in the coastal plain, the Yarkon River served during some historical periods as a political, social and cultural border. Tell Qudadi controls the passage on the Yarkon's shallow water and allowed its rulers to monitor trade caravans and also trade ships. From the site, other ancient settlements along the Yarkon River could have been seen, including Giv‘at Beth HaMitbachaim, Tell Qasile, Tel Gerisa, Tel Zeton and possibly even Tel Afek.

== Discovery ==
Until the mid-20th century, Tell Qudadi was known as a sand hill that rose a couple of metres above sea level. An aerial photograph of the site carried out by the German Air Force during World War I in 1917 showed it was completely covered in sand and soil. During Palestine campaign, the mound was used as an Ottoman military stronghold. After the British victory, a war monument was set up by the British to commemorate the battle of the crossing of the Yarkon River. This monument was made of an inscribed marble stone, which was imported from the site of Apollonia–Arsuf, some 12 kilometres (7.5 mi) to the north. Tell Qudadi was discovered for the first time in 1934 by Jacob Ory when he surveyed the region after it was reportedly robbed. It was declared a site of antiquities when it was listed in booklet of addenda to Mandatory antiquities sites.

== Excavations and date ==
A trial excavation was conducted in October 1937 on the site by P. L. O. Guy on behalf of the British School of Archaeology in Jerusalem. He discovered a wall from the time of the Persian (Achaemenid) rule of the region in the 6th to the 4th centuries BCE as well as Iron Age and Persian pottery. Salvage excavations were carried out by Eleazar Sukenik and Shmuel Yeivin of the Hebrew University of Jerusalem, with the help of Nahman Avigad. The excavation lasted from November 1937 to March 1938 and was funded by Pinhas Rutenberg. Two fortress from the Iron Age, one built atop the ruins of the other, were discovered. The site was excavated again in 1941, as part of a preservation plan, and in 1966, before an expansion of the Reading Power Station.

As mentioned above, the fortress has two archaeological phases. The first phase, which was securely dated to the late 8th century BCE by Tal and Fantalkin. The walls survived to a maximum height of 3 metres (9.8 ft) and were up to 7 metres (23 ft) wide. The eastern wall was preserved along 33 metres (108 ft) and the northern wall along 17 metres (56 ft). The rest of the walls was probably washed by the sea. The structure was founded on sandstones, and its inner walls were made of mudbricks. The fortress had a central courtyard accessed from the eastern wall. The second phase included a 4-metre-wide (13 ft) gate accessed by a paved road. Two burnt layers were discovered, which indicated that the fortress had been violently destroyed.

Additional pottery from different periods was discovered in the site in a layer of soil on top of the ruins including, the Early Bronze Age III, Persian rule, the Byzantine Empire rule and the Early Arab period.

== Dating ==
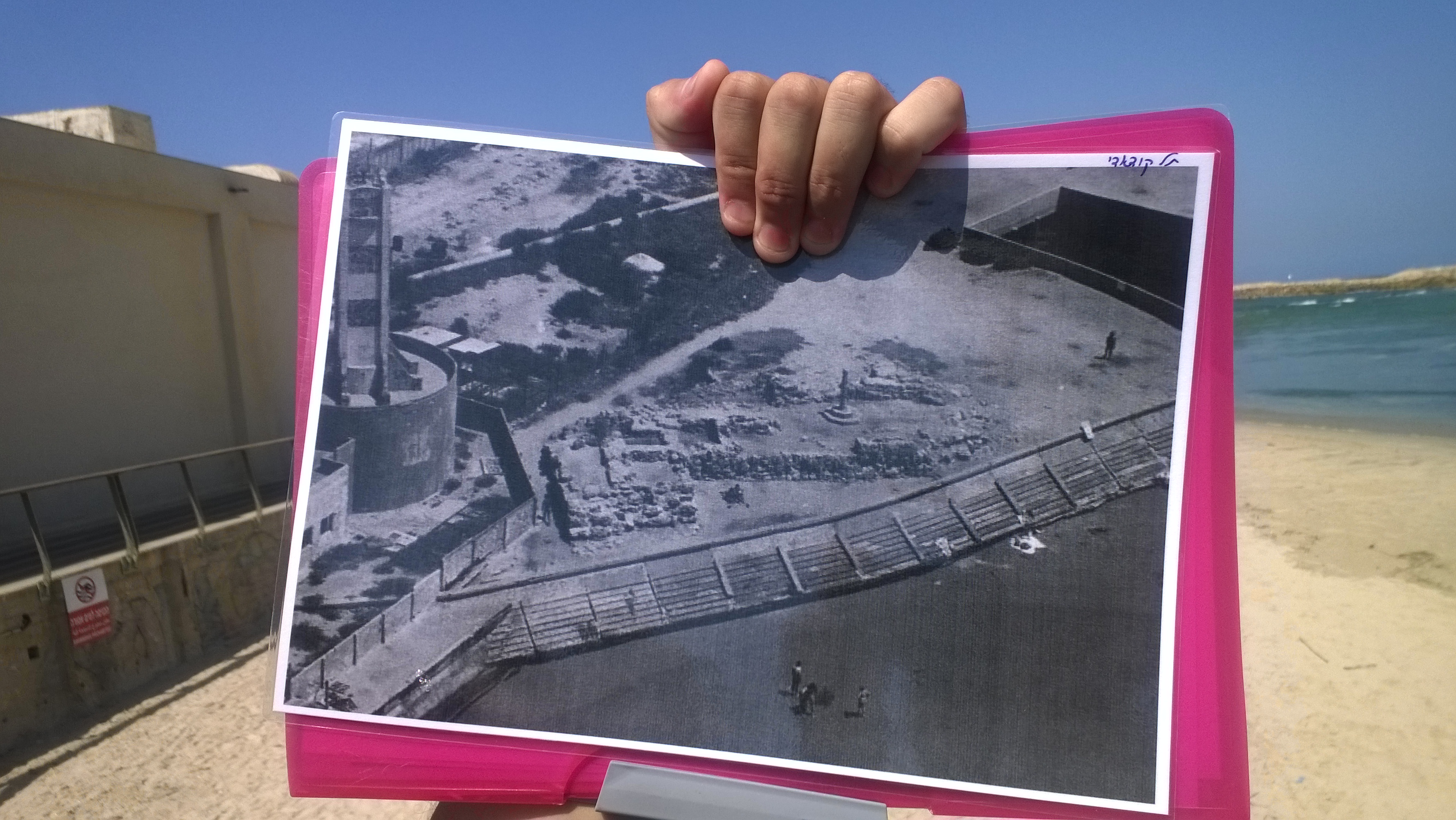
Photograph of the ruins from 1981

Yeivin and Avigad disagreed on the date of the construction of the first fortress. In an article published in 1960, Yeivin maintained that it was established in the 10th century BCE and linked it to biblical Solomon. Avigad who wrote the site's entry in The Encyclopedia of Archeological Excavations in the Holy Land in 1993 claimed it was established in the 9th century by the Kingdom of Israel (Samaria). As for the second fortress, the archaeologists claimed it was destroyed in the late 8th century, based on layers of destruction that could be seen inside it. They viewed the reason for the destruction to be part of the 732 BCE military campaign of the Assyrian King Tiglath-Pileser III in the region. The archaeologists also claimed to have found pottery from the 7th century that showed the site continued to be in use after the destruction. This reconstruction of the events was widely accepted by other scholars at the time. However, the final report of the excavation was never published, and some of their assumptions were disputed by the archaeologists Oren Tal and Alexander Fantalkin in a published in study from 2009.

Tal and Fantalkin have examined the notes written by the earlier archaeologists and the pottery they had found. They came to the conclusion that the site was settled not during the Israelite period but no earlier than the late 8th century BCE (the Assyrian campaign took place in 732 BCE), more than a century after the original date given by Sukenik and Yeivin in the 1930s. Therefore, the fortress was built by the Assyrian rulers or their vassals. It was part of a chain of forts built by the Assyrians along the coast. The absence of pottery characteristic of the end of the 7th century BCE dated the abandonment of the fortress to sometime after 650 BCE, around the time of the Assyrian withdrawal of the country. Their view was further supported by a unique find: a Greek amphora (a type of jar used to store oil), from the island of Lesbos. It is the earliest known Lesbian ceramic work in the whole Mediterranean, which may have reached the site by a trade ship.
