= Yarkon River =

River in central Israel

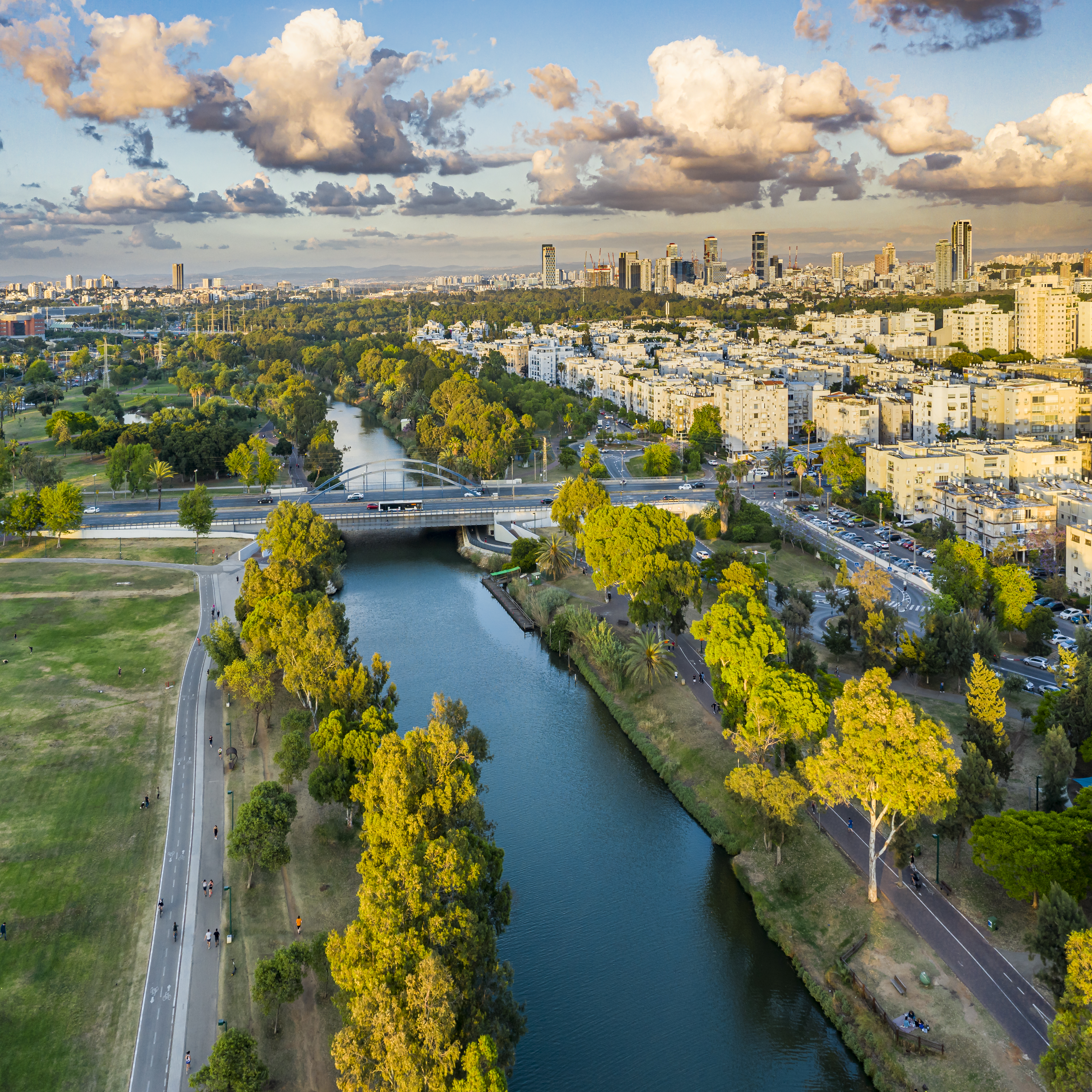

Location
- Country: Israel
- Cities: Tel Aviv, Petah Tikva, Rosh HaAyin

Physical characteristics
- Source: Tel Afek
  - location: near Rosh Ha'ayin, Central District, Israel
- Mouth: Mediterranean Sea
  - location: Tel Aviv, Tel Aviv District, Israel
  - coordinates: 32°5′45″N 34°46′48″E
- Length: 27.5 km (17.1 mi)
- Basin size: 801.463 km^{2} (309.447 sq mi)

The Yarkon River, also Yarqon River or Jarkon River (Hebrew: נחל הירקון, Nahal HaYarkon; Arabic: نهر العوجا, Nahr al-Auja), is a river in central Israel. The source of the Yarkon ("Greenish" in Hebrew) is at Tel Afek (Antipatris), north of Petah Tikva. It flows west through Gush Dan and Tel Aviv's Yarkon Park into the Mediterranean Sea. Its Arabic name, al-Auja, means "the meandering". The Yarkon is the largest coastal river in Israel, at 27.5 km in length.

== History ==
=== Iron Age ===
The Yarkon/Auja was the northern boundary of the territory of the Philistines. During the time of the Assyrian rule over the country, a fortress was built in a site known today as Tell Qudadi, on the northern bank of the river, next to its estuary.

=== Early Muslim period ===
On 27 April 750, the Abbasid general Abd Allah ibn Ali, uncle of Caliph al-Saffah (r. 750–754), marched to Antipatris ('Abu Futrus'). There, he summoned around eighty members of the Umayyad dynasty, whom the Abbasids had toppled earlier that year, with promises of fair surrender terms, only to have them massacred.

On 5 April 885, at the banks of the river, Abu'l-Abbas ibn al-Muwaffaq fought against Khumarawayh ibn Ahmad ibn Tulun in the Battle of Tawahin ('Battle of the Mills'). Ibn al-Muwaffaq defeated Khumarawayh, who fled to Egypt. However, Ibn al-Muwaffaq's army lost in a later engagement and he fled to Damascus.

In 975, the army of the Egypt-based Fatimid caliph al-Aziz defeated and captured the Aleppo-based Hamdanid general Aftakin on the banks of Auja.

=== Ottoman period ===
The Yarkon/Auja served as a key administrative boundary. In the early Ottoman period (16th century), it marked the boundary between Nablus Sanjak and Gaza Sanjak. Later, in the 19th century, it formed the southern border of the vilayet of Beirut.

=== World War I ===
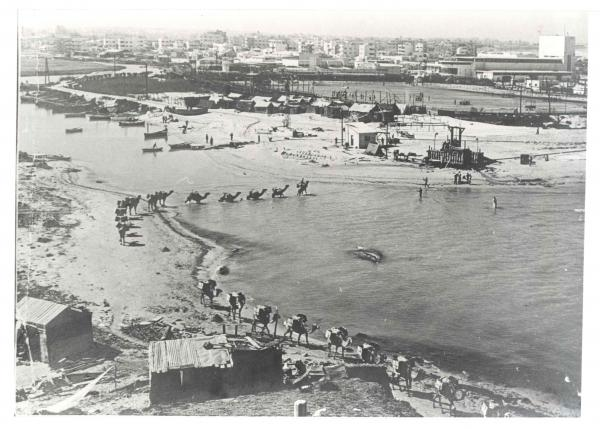
Camels crossing the Yarkon, 1934

The Arabic name of the river, al-Auja ("the meandering one"), is shared with Wadi Auja, another small stream that flows into the Jordan Valley north of Jericho. During World War I this coincidence led to the term of "the line of the two Aujas" referring to a strategic line connecting the two river valleys and taken by the expeditionary forces of General Allenby during his early 1918 advance against the Ottoman army.

The mouth of the river was conquered already during the late-1917 Battle of Jaffa.

=== Mandate period ===
In the Mandatory period, the British government granted a number of concessions, including to Pinhas Rutenberg's Jaffa Electric Company exclusive rights to generate, distribute, and sell electricity in the District of Jaffa. These rights were delivered through the "Auja Concession", which was formally signed on September 12, 1921. The Concession had authorized the company to generate electricity by means of hydroelectric turbines that would exploit the water power of the Yarkon River to supply electricity to the administrative District of Jaffa. The district comprised Jaffa, the oldest and at the time still most important town in the area, the fast growing town of Tel Aviv north of it, and other smaller locations. Yet the plan to generate electricity by hydroelectric means never materialized, and instead the company designed and built a powerhouse that produced electricity by means of diesel-fueled engines.

In 1930s, the British authorities in Palestine searched for an additional major water resource for the evolving city of Jerusalem. Two options were examined at the time: the Jordan River and the Yarkon River. The Jordan River is closer to Jerusalem but located at a much lower altitude than the Yarkon River and in order to bring the water up to the peaks of Jerusalem a relatively complex technology would be needed to be used, therefore the British authorities decided to opt for the alternative Yarkon-Jerusalem water extraction pipeline. Using water pumps placed in the springs which flowed into the Yarkon River, water was flowing up to Sha'ar HaGai and then through additional pumps into the city of Jerusalem. The Rosh HaAyin springs were, during the period of the British Mandate in Palestine, the main and most important water resource of Jerusalem. They provided 13,000 cubic meters of water every day to the city residents.

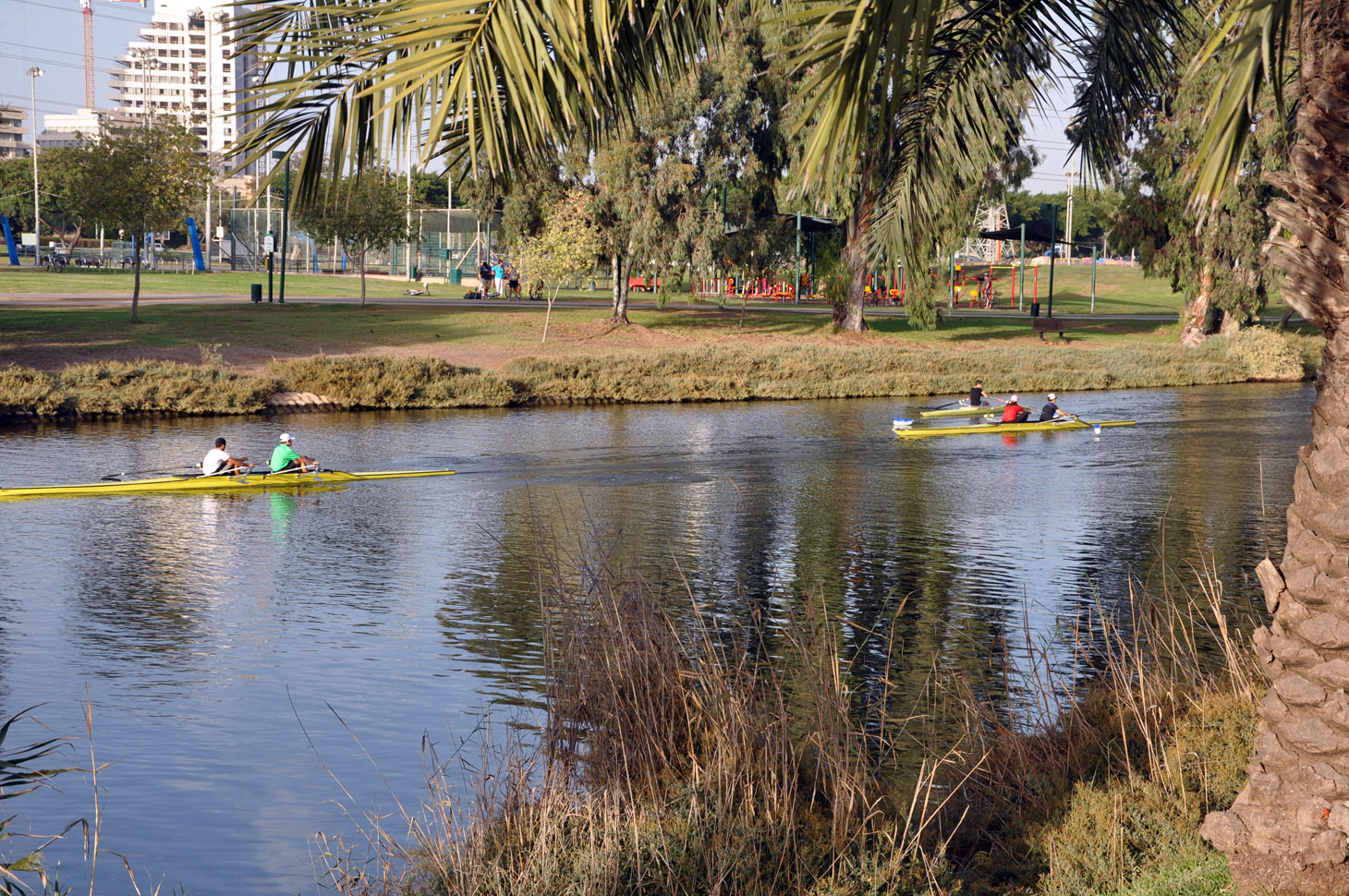
Yarkon Park

=== State of Israel ===
The river became increasingly polluted after the 1950s, many blaming this on the construction of the Reading Power Station which is situated near its mouth.

Subsequent and ongoing cleanup projects, some government-run, some benefitting from financial aid from Jewish donors from Australia, and some with regional character supported by the NGO FoEME, helped improve the quality of the water.

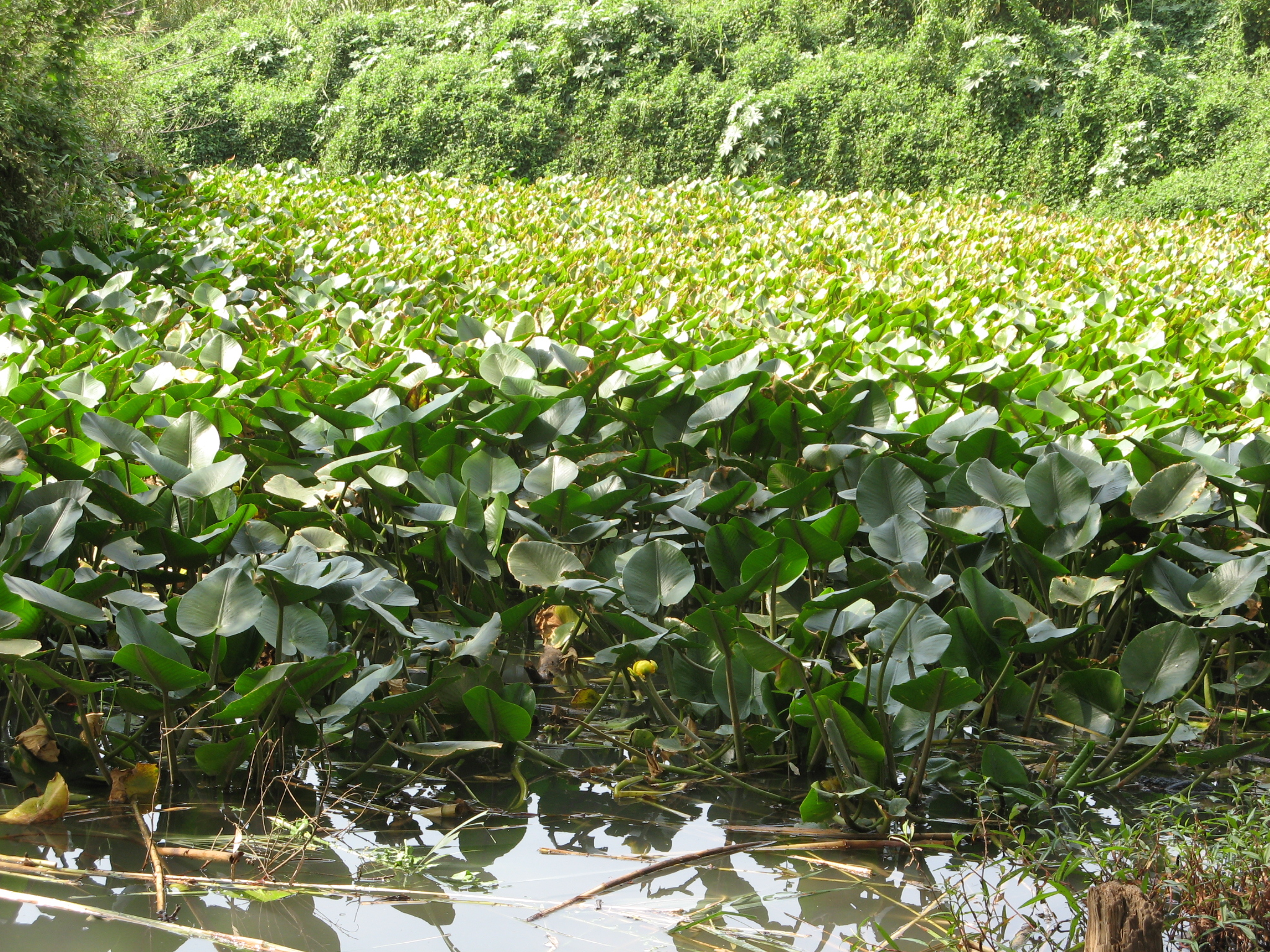
Nuphar lutea carpet in the upper Yarkon river.

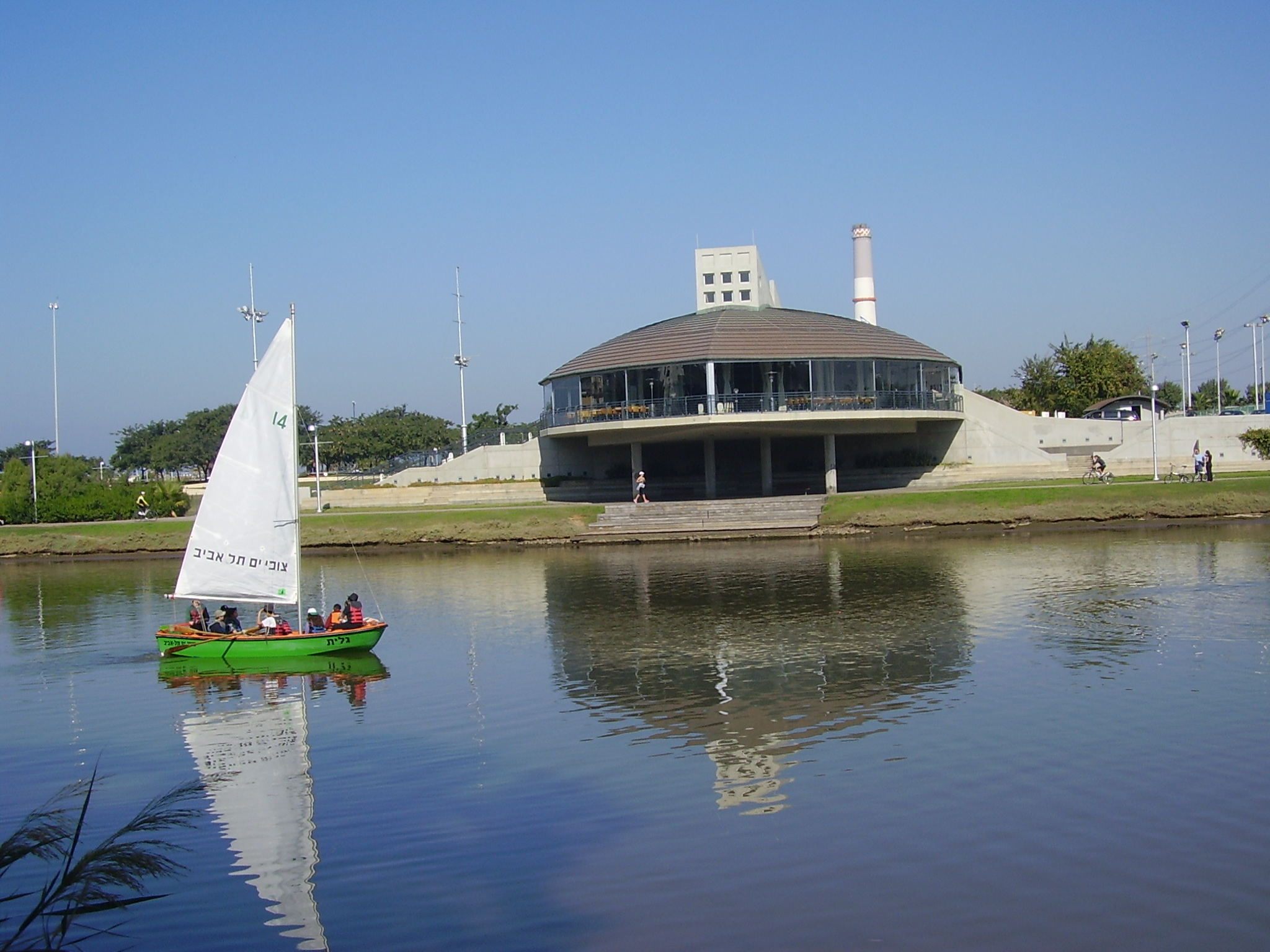
Sailing on Yarkon River

== Flora and fauna ==
The Yarkon River Authority website has a detailed list of vegetation and wildlife that can be found in and around the river. Mammals include nutria (coypu), swamp cat, and golden jackal. Although not mentioned by The Yarkon River Authority, Egyptian mongoose has also been spotted by visitors and hikers.

== Maccabiah disaster ==
On July 14, 1997, the Maccabiah bridge collapse led to the death of four athletes, members of the Australian delegation to the Maccabiah Games, three of whom died due to infections caused by exposure to the polluted river water.

== See also ==
- Ayalon River
- List of rivers of Israel
