= Rail transport in Israel =

Israel

Operation
- National railway: Israel Railways
- Infrastructure company: Israel Railways
- Major operators: Israel Railways

Statistics
- Ridership: 69 million (heavy rail in 2019)
- Freight: 8.5 million tons (2019)

System length
- Total: 1,511 km (939 mi) (heavy rail in 2022)
- Electrified: 250 km (heavy rail in 2022)

Track gauge
- Main: 1,435 mm

Features
- No. of stations: 69
- Max elevation: 750 m
Map
- This map shows all railways that have been operated by Palestine Railways, Israel Railways, or have existed on the territory of Israel/Palestine

Rail transport in Israel includes heavy rail (inter-city, commuter, and freight rail) as well as light rail. Excluding light rail, the network consists of 1,511 kilometers (939 mi) of track, and is undergoing constant expansion. All of the lines are standard gauge and as of 2023 approximately one-fifth of the heavy rail network is electrified, with additional electrification work underway. A government owned rail company, Israel Railways, manages the entire heavy rail network. Most of the network is located on the densely populated coastal plain.

Some of the rail routes in Israel date back to before the establishment of the state – to the days of the British Mandate for Palestine and earlier. Rail infrastructure was considered less important than road infrastructure during the state's early years, and except for the construction of the coastal railway in the early 1950s, the network saw little investment until the late 1980s. In 1993, a rail connection was opened between the coastal railway from the north and southern lines (the railway to Jerusalem and railway to Beersheba) through Tel Aviv. Previously the only connection between northern railways and southern railways bypassed the Tel Aviv region – Israel's population and commercial center. The linking of the nationwide rail network through the heart of Tel Aviv was a major factor in facilitating further expansion in the overall network during the 1990s and 2000s and as a result of the heavy infrastructure investments passenger traffic rose significantly, from about 2.5 million per year in 1990 to about 72 million in 2025.

Israel is a member of the International Union of Railways and its UIC country code is 95. Currently, the country does not have railway links to adjacent countries, but one such link is planned with Jordan. Further links existed with Egypt, Lebanon and Syria in earlier years. Unlike road vehicles and street trams, trains in Israel run on the left hand tracks.

In addition to heavy rail, several urban transport rail lines operate or are under construction in Israel. These include a short funicular underground railway in Haifa which opened in 1959 (Carmelit), two light rail lines in Jerusalem (opened in 2011 and 2026) and another light rail line in Tel Aviv, which began operations in 2023.

== History ==
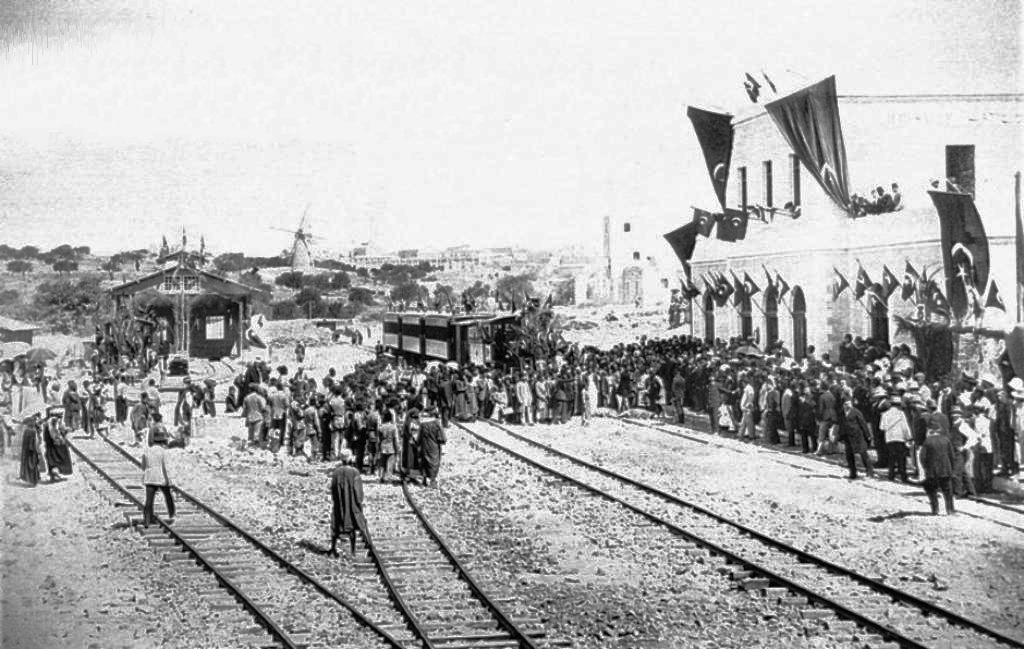
The first Jaffa–Jerusalem train arriving in Jerusalem

=== Ottoman Empire ===
Rail infrastructure in what is now Israel was first envisioned and realized during the Ottoman period. In 1839, Sir Moses Montefiore was an early proponent of trains in Palestine. However, the first railroad in Palestine was the Jaffa-Jerusalem railway, initiated by the Ottoman Jewish entrepreneur Joseph Navon Bey and built by the French at meter gauge. It opened on September 26, 1892 with a travel time of 3 hours and 30 minutes.

The second line in what is now Israel was the Jezreel Valley railway from Haifa to Beit She’an, which had been built in 1904 as part of the Haifa-Daraa branch, a 1905-built feeder line of the Hejaz Railway which ran from Medina to Damascus. During the Ottoman era, the network grew: Nablus, Kalkiliya, and Beersheba all gained train stations. The First World War brought yet another rail line: the Ottomans, with German assistance, laid tracks from Beersheba to Kadesh Barnea on the Sinai Peninsula. (This line ran through trains from Afula through Tulkarm.) This resulted in the construction of the eastern and southern railways.

=== Mideastern regional rail travel: the British Mandate ===
During World War I, the British invaded the Levant, dismantled the Kadesh Barnea line, and built a new line from Beersheba to Gaza, allowing a connection with their own line from Egypt, running through Lod to Haifa. In 1920 a new company, called Palestine Railways, was established; it took over the responsibility of running the country's rail network. During the British Mandate, rail travel increased considerably, with a line being built between Petach Tikva and Rosh HaAyin, and Lydda (which was near the main airport in the area) becoming a major hub during WWII. Also during the war, in 1942, the British opened a route running from Haifa to Beirut and Tripoli. Shortly after the war expired, the Rosh HaNikra tunnel was dug, allowing train travel from Lebanon and points north (and west) to Palestine and Egypt.

Starting in 1917–18, the British converted the Ottoman 1050 mm gauge southern, eastern and Jerusalem railways to standard gauge, though not the Jezreel Valley railway and some of its branches, which remained narrow gauge and thus incompatible with the rest of the railways in Palestine. The British also extended some of the existing railways and connected them with adjacent countries and built 600 mm (1 ft 11 5/8 in) gauge lines in Jaffa and Jerusalem. After the First World War ended, the British nationalized all railways in the Palestine mandate and created the Palestine Railways company to manage operations.

=== Israel ===
When Israel gained independence in 1948, the state created Israel Railways as a successor to the British company. During the 1947–1949 Palestine war, much damage was done to the railways in the country, especially the Jezreel Valley railway, which was not rebuilt due to financial constraints and its incompatibility with the rest of the rail network.

In the first years of Israeli independence, rail passenger traffic grew rapidly, reaching about 4.5 million passengers per annum during the early to mid-1960s, at which point traffic began to slacken due to improvements in the road infrastructure, increases in the automobile ownership rate, lack of investment in the rail network, and a continued favoring of public transportation using buses over trains. This trend reached a low point of about 2.5 million passengers in 1990, which on a per-capita basis represented about a 75% decrease from the heyday of the 1960s. Then in the 1990s, a wave of railway infrastructure development began, leading to a resurgence of the railways' importance within the country's transportation system.

As of 2010, the rail network in Israel spanned approximately 1,000 km (620 mi), while around 250 km (160 mi) additional was expected to be under construction in the early 2010s decade. The majority of the network has been double tracked, the result of extensive works which have been ongoing since around 1990 to increase capacity throughout the network.

In the early 2000s, the Israeli government embarked on a major project to upgrade the existing rail network and build a number of entirely new lines. This includes rebuilding the railways to Kfar Saba and Beersheba, while converting them to double-track and constructing dozens of grade separations between road and rail. Then in the 2010s decade, rebuilding the Jezreel Valley railway and creating new lines: the Railway to Karmiel, the High-speed railway to Jerusalem, a line from Ashkelon to Beersheba through Sderot, Netivot and Ofakim, and a railway as part of the Route 531 project. Some of these projects were initiated in the 2000s but were eventually frozen, with work on some resuming in 2009–2010, when they were included in a major government plan to connect almost all cities in Israel to the rail network.

Electrification reached the network with the first section of the newly built Tel Aviv–Jerusalem railway in 2018. Electrification of existing lines has continued at a rapid pace in subsequent years. The long term goal is for the entire network to be electrified, a feat which As of 2026 only Switzerland has accomplished, but India is close to achieving at 99% electrification as of 2026.

== Rail infrastructure ==
=== Heavy rail ===
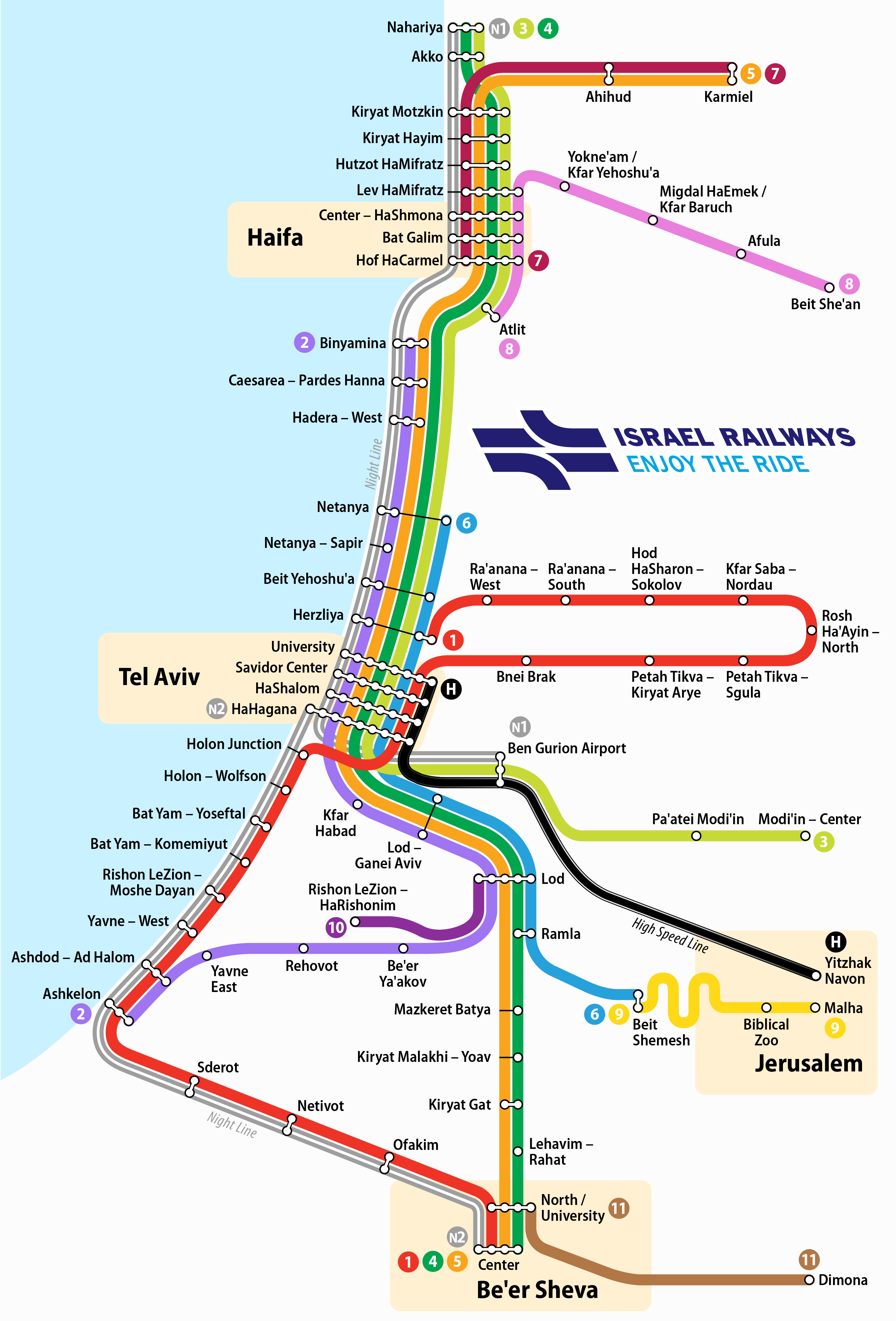
Map of Israel Railways lines and stations

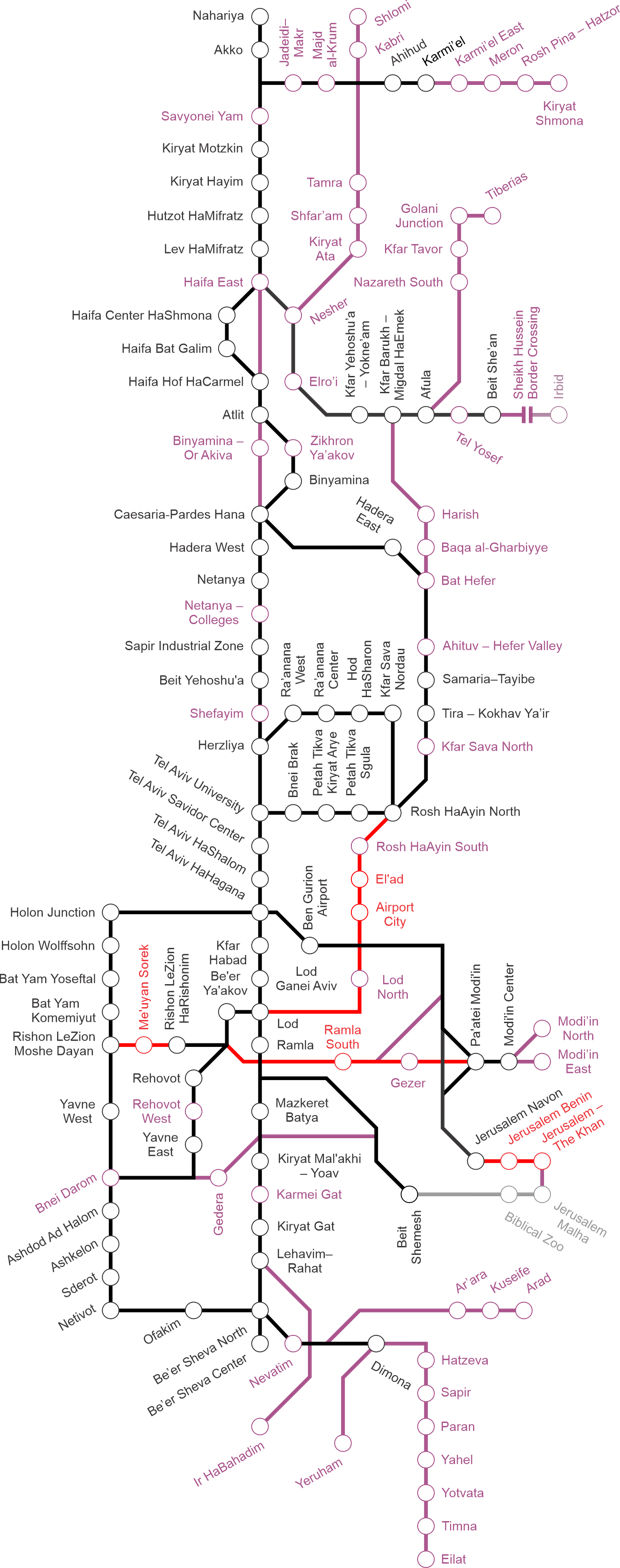
Approved long-term plans for passenger railways in Israel. Black signifies existing lines, red—lines under construction, and purple—planned lines.

The rail network includes the coastal railway line spanning from Nahariya in the north to Tel Aviv in the south, through Acre, Haifa (with a spur to eastern Haifa), Netanya and other cities. A small commuter line goes from Kfar Saba in the north to Tel Aviv, and connects to a freight-only line from Rosh HaAyin to Lod, part of the partially defunct Eastern railway. Plans exist to rebuild the eastern railway from Hadera to Rosh HaAyin, with a spur to Afula.

Six lines go south from Tel Aviv, including two lines to Rishon LeZion, one of which continues to Yavne with a section from Yavne to Ashdod currently under construction; a line to Ashkelon through Lod and Rehovot with a spur to the Port of Ashdod; a line to Modi'in through Ben Gurion International Airport; a line to Jerusalem, which is part of the historical Jaffa–Jerusalem railway; and the railway to Beersheba, with branches to Ramat Hovav and the Israel Chemicals factories through Dimona. The railway to Beersheba is also connected to the line to Ashkelon through the Heletz railway.

==== Network expansion ====
Several major railway projects are expected to be carried out starting in the early 2020s. The first involves relieving the national rail network bottleneck caused by insufficient capacity in the Ayalon section of the Coastal Railway through the addition of a fourth railroad track between Tel Aviv Central and Tel Aviv HaHagana. The overall project also includes adding two additional tracks to the Tel Aviv–Lod railway. Another major project that began construction is the Rishon LeZion–Modi'in railway, linking Rishon LeZion and Modi'in via Highway 431, with a connection to the new Tel Aviv–Jerusalem railway. This will allow direct train travel between Jerusalem and Modi'in and the southern Gush Dan suburbs. The third major project expected to commence by 2020 is the rebuilding of the long-defunct Kfar Sava–Hadera section of the Eastern railway, which will create a new north–south railway corridor in central Israel. The project also includes upgrading the existing Eastern railway section between Rosh Ha’ayin and Lod.

Longer-term plans call for a railway to Eilat (Med-Red), a line to Arad through Nevatim and Kseifa, a line to Nazareth and continuing the Karmiel and Jezreel Valley lines to Kiryat Shmona, Safed and Tiberias.

==== Electrification ====
In the spring of 2010, the government of Israel voted to appropriate the sum of NIS 11.2 billion out of a total NIS 17.2 billion (appx. US $4.5 billion) necessary to implement the first phase of Israel Railways' electrification programme. This phase includes electrifying 420 km of railways using 25 kV 50 Hz AC, the construction of 14 transformer stations, the purchase of electric rolling stock, and upgrades to maintenance facilities as well as to signalling and control systems (including the installation of ETCS Level 2 signaling throughout the network). Preliminary design for the electrification effort was conducted by Tedem Civil Engineering in the early 2000s, while Yanai Electrical Engineering was selected by Israel Railways in 2011 to carry out the detailed design of the system. In December 2015 Israel Railways announced that the Spanish engineering firm SEMI (Sociedad Española de Montajes Industriales) won the tender for constructing the electrification infrastructure.

As of February 2023, there are 4 electrified lines

- Tel Aviv–Jerusalem railway.
- Herzliya–Ashkelon
- Jerusalem–Modi'in
- Ashkelon/Rehovot–Netanya/Binyamina

==== Technical characteristics ====
The following standards are employed throughout the mainline heavy rail network in Israel:

- Rail gauge: 1,435 mm (4 ft 8 1/2 in)
- Max speed: 160 km/h (99 mph)
- Rail type: UIC60 or UIC54 (60 kg/m (120 lb/yd) or 54 kg/m (110 lb/yd)), continuously welded
- Loading gauge: UIC GC
- Minimum curve radius: 190 m (620 ft) (main lines)
- Common distance between track centers of multi-tracked railways: 4.7 m (15 ft 5 in)
- Train protection system: PZB/Indusi
- Interlocking: Electronic (Thales LockTrac 6111/ESTW L90)
- National traffic control system: Thales NetTrac 6613 ARAMIS
- Railway coupling: Buffers and chain (locomotive drawn), Scharfenberg (multiple unit trainsets)
- Maximum gradient: 29‰
- Max rolling stock axle load: 22.5 metric ton per axle
- Minimum number of sleepers per kilometer: 1667 (mostly B70 prestressed concrete monoblock)
- Passenger platform minimum length: 300 m (980 ft) (some older stations use the previous standard of 250 m (820 ft); new and upgraded stations: 350 m (1,150 ft))
- Electrification: Single-phase 25 kV 50 Hz AC OCS
- Train control system: ERTMS (GSM-R/ETCS L2) – will replace Indusi

==== Sandwich stations ====
An interesting character of the current Israeli railway network is that many of the new tracks and railway stations are located in the median strip of the Israeli highway system. The first station such located was the Tel Aviv Savidor Central railway station, whose original platforms directly north of the station hall were closed and replaced with new platforms in the median strip of the Ayalon Freeway in 1988; the first station purpose-built in this arrangement was the Tel Aviv HaShalom railway station, a kilometer south of Savidor Central.

=== Metro/Light rail ===
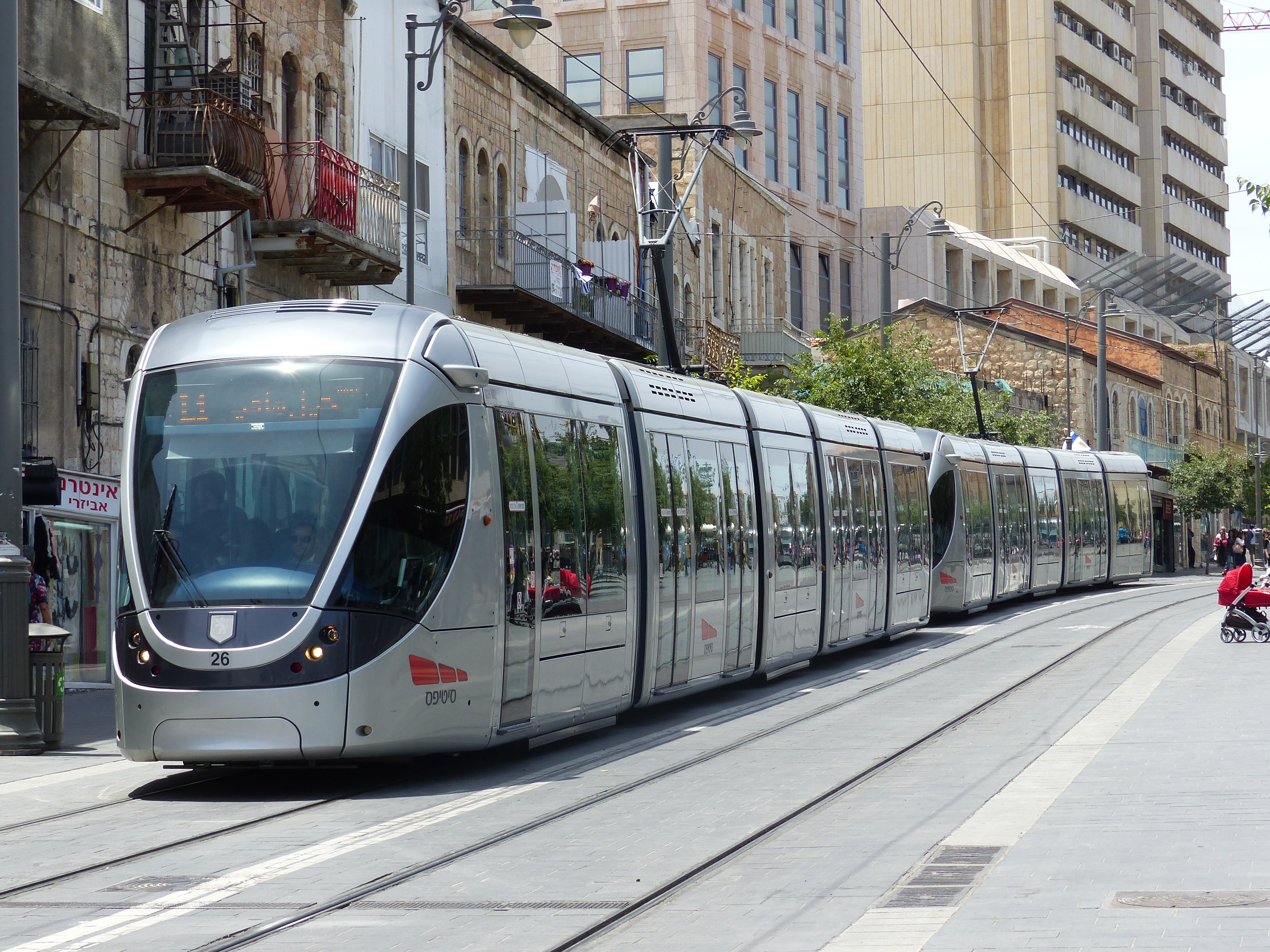
A Jerusalem Light Rail tram on Jaffa Road in Jerusalem

The first light rail line in Israel is the Jerusalem Light Rail, which opened in 2011. The line is 13.8 km (8.6 mi) long and goes from Mount Herzl in the west to Pisgat Ze'ev in the east. An extension of the western side to Hadassah Ein Kerem and the eastern side to Neve Ya'akov was opened in 2023. The Green Line is under construction (planned to open in 2025).

A major LRT network is under construction in the Tel Aviv metropolitan area, with three lines of the Tel Aviv Light Rail for a total of 90 km (56 mi) and 139 stations. The Red Line (opened in 2023) connects Petah Tikva in the northeast to Bat Yam in the southwest, with a 12 km (7.5 mi) underground section, passing through Tel Aviv, Bnei Brak, and Ramat Gan. It has 34 stations, including 10 underground ones. The Green Line will run from Holon to Rishon LeZion through central Tel Aviv, and from there will split into two branches, one to Herzliya and the other to the Ramat HaHayal neighborhood of Tel Aviv. It will include a 4.5 km (2.8 mi) underground section. The line will have 62 stations, including 4 underground ones. The Purple Line will start at Tel Aviv Savidor Central railway station, passing through the city and continuing east to Yehud with an extension to Kiryat Ono and Bar Ilan University. It will have 43 stations. Unlike the other two lines, it will be entirely above ground. Both the Green Line and the Purple Line are under construction and the estimated opening year is 2027/2028.

The Tel Aviv Metro, an extensive 3-line subway system, is planned for Tel Aviv and surrounding cities in the Gush Dan area. It will consist of 3 lines with a total length of 150 km (93 mi) and 109 stations. Construction began in 2025 and operation of the first sections is scheduled for 2032.

The Haifa–Nazareth railway is a 41 km (25 mi) tram-train line from Haifa to Nazareth currently under construction. It will have 20 stations. Preliminary construction started in 2022 and in February 2024 a consortium of Alstom, Electra and Manrav was announced as selected to build an operate the line for 25 years. The contract was officially signed on 16 May 2024. As of 2024 Nazareth is the largest city in Israel without passenger rail service.

An underground funicular rail line, called Carmelit, was opened in Haifa in 1959. It is 1.8 km (1.1 mi) long and has 6 stations. If one is to define it as subway (most definitions exclude it from the category "subway") it would be the first in the MENA region or the second after Tünel which was built in what was then the Ottoman Empire but is usually also not considered a subway.

The Beersheba Light Rail, which will serve the city of Beersheba and outlying towns, was approved in August 2023. It is expected to be completed in 2033.

The Ashkelon Mass Transit System, a planned mass transit system for the Ashkelon Subdistrict, is expected to include two light rail lines which will cover the cities of Ashdod, Ashkelon, Rehovot, and Yavne.

== Passenger traffic ==
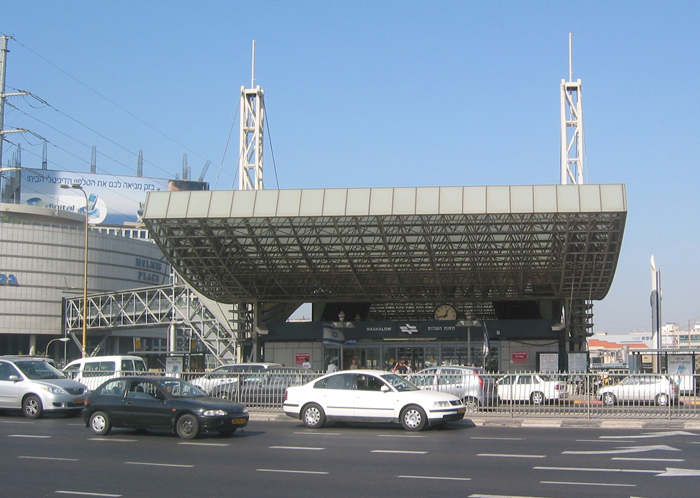
Tel Aviv HaShalom, one of the most recognizable railway stations in Israel

Following the low point of 2.5 million passengers in 1990, the extensive investments in the national heavy rail infrastructure beginning in the early to mid-1990s made train travel more appealing, especially given the ever-increasing road congestion, and consequently passenger rail use began rising rapidly—by a factor of about fivefold over any given ten-year span during the 1990s and 2000s. Consequently, in the 25-year span between 1990 and 2015, heavy rail passenger traffic grew over 20-times. Moreover, with several large-scale railway infrastructure projects still underway and more planned in the future, the growth in passenger numbers is expected to continue.

=== Statistics ===
==== Ridership ====
The following table includes ridership statistics for heavy rail only.

Year						1996	1997	1998	1999	2000
Passengers (millions)						5.1	5.6	6.4	8.8	12.7
Year	2001	2002	2003	2004	2005	2006	2007	2008	2009	2010
Passengers (millions)	15.1	17.5	19.8	22.9	26.8	28.4	31.8	35.13	35.93	35.87
Year	2011	2012	2013	2014	2015	2016	2017	2018	2019	2020
Passengers (millions)	35.93	40.37	45.1	48.5	52.8	59.5	64.6	67.7	69	24.2
Year	2021	2022	2023	2024	2025					
Passengers (millions)	35	54.7	62.5	65.4	71.8					
Source: Israel Railways

==== Passenger kilometres ====
The following table contains the total travelled distances for all passengers per annum.

Year	1980	1985	1990	1995	2000	2005	2010	2015	2020	2025
Passenger km (millions)	264	204	169	267	781	1,616	1,986	2,608	1,252.9	3,999.8
Source: The World Bank, Israel Central Bureau of Statistics

=== Passenger stations ===
Name	Hebrew	City	Lines
Acre	עכו	Acre	Be'er Sheva Center – Nahariya; Modi'in Center – Nahariya
Afula	עפולה	Afula	Atlit – Beit She'an
Ashdod Ad Halom; Ashdod South	אשדוד עד הלום אשדוד דרום	Ashdod	Ashkelon – Herzliya; Be'er Sheva Center – Binyamina
Ashkelon	אשקלון	Ashkelon	Be'er Sheva Center – Ashkelon; Ashkelon – Herzliya; Be'er Sheva Center – Binyamina
Atlit	עתלית	Atlit	Atlit – Beit She'an; Modi'in Center – Nahariya
Bat Yam-Komemiyut	בת ים - קוממיות	Bat Yam / Holon	Ashkelon – Herzliya
Bat Yam-Yoseftal	בת-ים יוספטל	Bat Yam / Holon	Ashkelon – Herzliya
Be'er Sheva Center	באר שבע מרכז	Beersheba	Be'er Sheva Center – Ashkelon; Be'er Sheva Center – Binyamina; Be'er Sheva Center – Nahariya; Be'er Sheva Center – Karmiel
Be'er Sheva North; University	באר שבע צפון אוניברסיטה	Beersheba	Be'er Sheva Center – Ashkelon; Be'er Sheva Center – Binyamina; Be'er Sheva Center – Nahariya; Be'er Sheva Center – Karmiel; Be'er Sheva North – Dimona
Be'er Ya'akov	באר יעקב	Be'er Ya'akov	Be'er Sheva Center – Binyamina
Ben Gurion Airport	נמל תעופה בן גוריון	Ben Gurion International Airport	Jerusalem Yitzhak Navon – Herzliya; Modi'in Center – Nahariya
Beit She'an	בית שאן	Beit She'an	Atlit – Beit She'an
Beit Shemesh	בית שמש	Beit Shemesh	Beit Shemesh – Netanya
Beit Yehoshua	בית יהושע	Beit Yehoshua	Be'er Sheva Center – Binyamina; Beit Shemesh – Netanya
Biblical Zoo	גן החיות התנ"כי	Jerusalem	Not in service
Binyamina	בנימינה	Binyamina-Giv'at Ada	Be'er Sheva Center – Binyamina; Modi'in Center – Nahariya
Bnei Brak	בני ברק	Bnei Brak / Ramat Gan	Ashkelon – Herzliya
Caesarea-Pardes Hanna	קיסריה-פרדס חנה	Pardes Hanna-Karkur; Caesarea Industrial Zone	Be'er Sheva Center – Binyamina
Dimona	דימונה	Dimona	Be'er Sheva North – Dimona
Hadera West	חדרה מערב	Hadera	Be'er Sheva Center – Binyamina; Be'er Sheva Center – Karmiel
Haifa Bat Galim	חיפה בת גלים	Haifa	Be'er Sheva Center – Nahariya; Be'er Sheva Center – Karmiel; Haifa Hof HaCarmel – Karmiel; Modi'in Center – Nahariya; Atlit – Beit She'an
Haifa Hof HaCarmel	חיפה חוף הכרמל	Haifa	Be'er Sheva Center – Nahariya; Be'er Sheva Center – Karmiel; Haifa Hof HaCarmel – Karmiel; Modi'in Center – Nahariya; Atlit – Beit She'an
Haifa Center HaShmona	חיפה מרכז השמונה	Haifa	Be'er Sheva Center – Nahariya; Be'er Sheva Center – Karmiel; Haifa Hof HaCarmel – Karmiel; Modi'in Center – Nahariya; Atlit – Beit She'an
HaMifrats Central	מרכזית המפרץ	Haifa	Be'er Sheva Center – Nahariya; Be'er Sheva Center – Karmiel; Haifa Hof HaCarmel – Karmiel; Modi'in Center – Nahariya; Atlit – Beit She'an
Herzliya	הרצליה	Herzliya	Jerusalem Yitzhak Navon – Herzliya; Ashkelon – Herzliya; Be'er Sheva Center – Binyamina; Be'er Sheva Center – Nahariya; Be'er Sheva Center – Karmiel; Beit Shemesh – Netanya
Hod HaSharon Sokolov (Kfar Saba)	הוד השרון סוקולוב כפר סבא	Hod HaSharon / Kfar Saba	Ashkelon – Herzliya
Holon-Wolfson	חולון-וולפסון	Holon / Tel Aviv-Yafo	Ashkelon – Herzliya
Holon Junction	צומת חולון	Holon / Tel Aviv	Ashkelon – Herzliya
Hutzot HaMifratz	חוצות המפרץ	Haifa	Haifa Hof HaCarmel – Karmiel; Modi'in Center – Nahariya
Jerusalem Malha	ירושלים מלחה	Jerusalem	Not in service
Jerusalem Yitzhak Navon	ירושלים יצחק נבון	Jerusalem	Jerusalem Yitzhak Navon – Herzliya
Kfar Chabad	כפר חב"ד	Kfar Chabad	Be'er Sheva Center – Binyamina
Kfar Saba – Nordau (Hod HaSharon)	כפר סבא נורדאו הוד השרון	Kfar Saba / Hod HaSharon	Ashkelon – Herzliya
Kiryat Gat	קרית גת	Kiryat Gat	Be'er Sheva Center – Nahariya; Be'er Sheva Center – Karmiel
Kiryat Haim	קריית חיים	Haifa (Kiryat Haim)	Haifa Hof HaCarmel – Karmiel; Modi'in Center – Nahariya
Kiryat Motzkin	קריית מוצקין	Haifa (Kiryat Shmuel); Kiryat Motzkin	Be'er Sheva Center – Nahariya; Be'er Sheva Center – Karmiel; Haifa Hof HaCarmel – Karmiel; Modi'in Center – Nahariya
Lehavim-Rahat	להבים רהט	Lehavim	Be'er Sheva Center – Nahariya
Lod	לוד	Lod	Be'er Sheva Center – Binyamina; Be'er Sheva Center – Nahariya; Be'er Sheva Center – Karmiel; Beit Shemesh – Netanya
Lod Ganei Aviv	לוד גני אביב	Lod	Be'er Sheva Center – Binyamina; Beit Shemesh – Netanya
Migdal HaEmek – Kfar Baruch	מגדל העמק-כפר ברוך	Migdal HaEmek, Kfar Baruch	Atlit – Beit She'an
Modi'in Central	מודיעין מרכז	Modi'in	Modi'in Center – Nahariya
Nahariya	נהריה	Nahariya	Be'er Sheva Center – Nahariya; Modi'in Center – Nahariya
Netanya	נתניה	Netanya	Be'er Sheva Center – Binyamina; Beit Shemesh – Netanya
Netivot	נתיבות	Netivot	Be'er Sheva Center – Ashkelon; Be'er Sheva Center – Binyamina
Ofakim	אופקים	Ofakim	Be'er Sheva Center – Ashkelon; Be'er Sheva Center – Binyamina
Pa'atei Modi'in	פאתי מודיעין	Modi'in	Modi'in Center – Nahariya
Petah Tikva Kiryat Aryeh	פתח תקווה קרית אריה	Petah Tikva	Ashkelon – Herzliya
Petah Tikva Segula	פתח תקווה סגולה	Petah Tikva	Ashkelon – Herzliya
Ra'anana South	רעננה דרום	Ra'anana	Ashkelon – Herzliya
Ra'anana West	רעננה מערב	Ra'anana	Ashkelon – Herzliya
Ramla	רמלה	Ramla	Be'er Sheva Center – Nahariya; Beit Shemesh – Netanya
Rehovot	רחובות	Rehovot	Be'er Sheva Center – Binyamina
Rishon LeZion HaRishonim	ראשון לציון הראשונים	Rishon LeZion	Not in service
Rishon LeZion Moshe Dayan	ראשון לציון משה דיין	Rishon LeZion	Ashkelon – Herzliya
Rosh HaAyin Tzafon	ראש העין צפון	Rosh HaAyin / Neve Yerek	Ashkelon – Herzliya
Sderot	שדרות	Sderot	Be'er Sheva Center – Ashkelon; Be'er Sheva Center – Binyamina
Tel Aviv HaHagana	תל אביב ההגנה	Tel Aviv	Jerusalem Yitzhak Navon – Herzliya; Ashkelon – Herzliya; Be'er Sheva Center – Binyamina; Be'er Sheva Center – Nahariya; Be'er Sheva Center – Karmiel; Modi'in Center – Nahariya
Tel Aviv HaShalom	תל אביב השלום	Tel Aviv	Jerusalem Yitzhak Navon – Herzliya; Ashkelon – Herzliya; Be'er Sheva Center – Binyamina; Be'er Sheva Center – Nahariya; Be'er Sheva Center – Karmiel; Modi'in Center – Nahariya; Beit Shemesh – Netanya
Tel Aviv Central; Savidor	תל אביב מרכז סבידור	Tel Aviv / Ramat Gan	Jerusalem Yitzhak Navon – Herzliya; Ashkelon – Herzliya; Be'er Sheva Center – Binyamina; Be'er Sheva Center – Nahariya; Be'er Sheva Center – Karmiel; Modi'in Center – Nahariya; Beit Shemesh – Netanya
Tel Aviv University; Convention Center	תל אביב אוניברסיטה מרכז הירידים	Tel Aviv	Jerusalem Yitzhak Navon – Herzliya; Ashkelon – Herzliya; Be'er Sheva Center – Binyamina; Be'er Sheva Center – Nahariya; Be'er Sheva Center – Karmiel; Modi'in Center – Nahariya; Beit Shemesh – Netanya
Yavne East	יבנה	Yavne	Be'er Sheva Center – Binyamina
Yavne West	יבנה מערב	Yavne	Ashkelon – Herzliya
Yokneam – Kfar Yehoshua	יקנעם-כפר יהושע	Yokneam Illit, Kfar Yehoshua	Atlit – Beit She'an

== Freight ==
According to official statistics, Israel Railways transported approximately seven million tons of freight in 2010. Minerals and chemicals from the Dead Sea area, such as phosphates, potash and sulphur, made up more than half of this amount. As of 2011, the share of total domestic freight transported by rail is approximately 8%. The government of Israel, believing that freight rail transport in the country is underutilized, particularly with respect to container transport, has set a goal of doubling the amount of freight transported by rail by the middle of the 2010s decade and tripling it by the end of the decade. Its plan calls for an upgrade of the freight transport infrastructure, including more freight terminals, new or renewed sidings to factories and other customers, and the purchase of additional freight locomotives and freight cars. From an administrative perspective, Israel Railways' freight division will be spun off into a separate subsidiary, which will be 51% privately owned by a strategic partner committed to maximizing the railway's freight transport potential. The new subsidiary will be allowed to partner directly with other transport providers in the private sector in order to offer customers more cost-effective, flexible and complete transport and logistical solutions than those currently offered by Israel Railways.

== Rail links to adjacent countries ==
Originally part of the Palestine Railway, a line linked East Qantara north of the Suez Canal in Egypt, skirting the Mediterranean northward to the port of Tripoli, Lebanon. In 1912, the French built an extension of the Baghdad Railway south from Aleppo, Syria, to connect at Tripoli, Lebanon. Expanded during World War II by both Australian and later New Zealand engineers, the effective footprint extended as far as Damascus.

For a railway both created and affected by the logistical need of military engineers supporting various war efforts, on the establishment of the State of Israel in 1948 and the outbreak of hostilities during the 1947–1949 Palestine war, those connections were severed and have yet to be restored.

Israeli forces bombed the rail bridge to Lebanon, and the remnants of this line can be seen at Rosh HaNikra grottoes, where a virtual "train ride to peace" movie is shown inside the sealed tunnel that used to go into Lebanon. The tracks used to continue from Rosh HaNikra to Nahariya (the current northern end of the line) making it possible for one to travel from Lebanon all the way to Tel Aviv, Cairo, and beyond. However, current Israel Railways proposals for a link with Lebanon are planned to branch off the Haifa-Karmiel railway in Ahihud. Northerly, there was a route to Syria and connection via Syrian Railways to Damascus.

=== Railway links with adjacent countries ===
- Lebanon – defunct
- Syria – defunct (narrow gauge)
- Jordan – proposed
- Egypt – defunct

=== Proposed rail lines to the PA ===
Talks between Israel and the Palestinian Authority in 2004 have raised the possibility of reviving the old line from the Gaza Strip to Tulkarem and/or building a new line from Gaza to Tarkumia (near Hebron) with the aim of securely transporting people and goods between Gaza and the West Bank through Israeli territory as well as for transporting cargo to and from the Israeli port of Ashdod destined to the Palestinian Authority. Another proposed line would involve the revival of the old Hejaz railway branch from Afula to Jenin.
