= Ra'anana–South railway station =

Railway station in Israel

Ra'anana–South רעננה – דרום
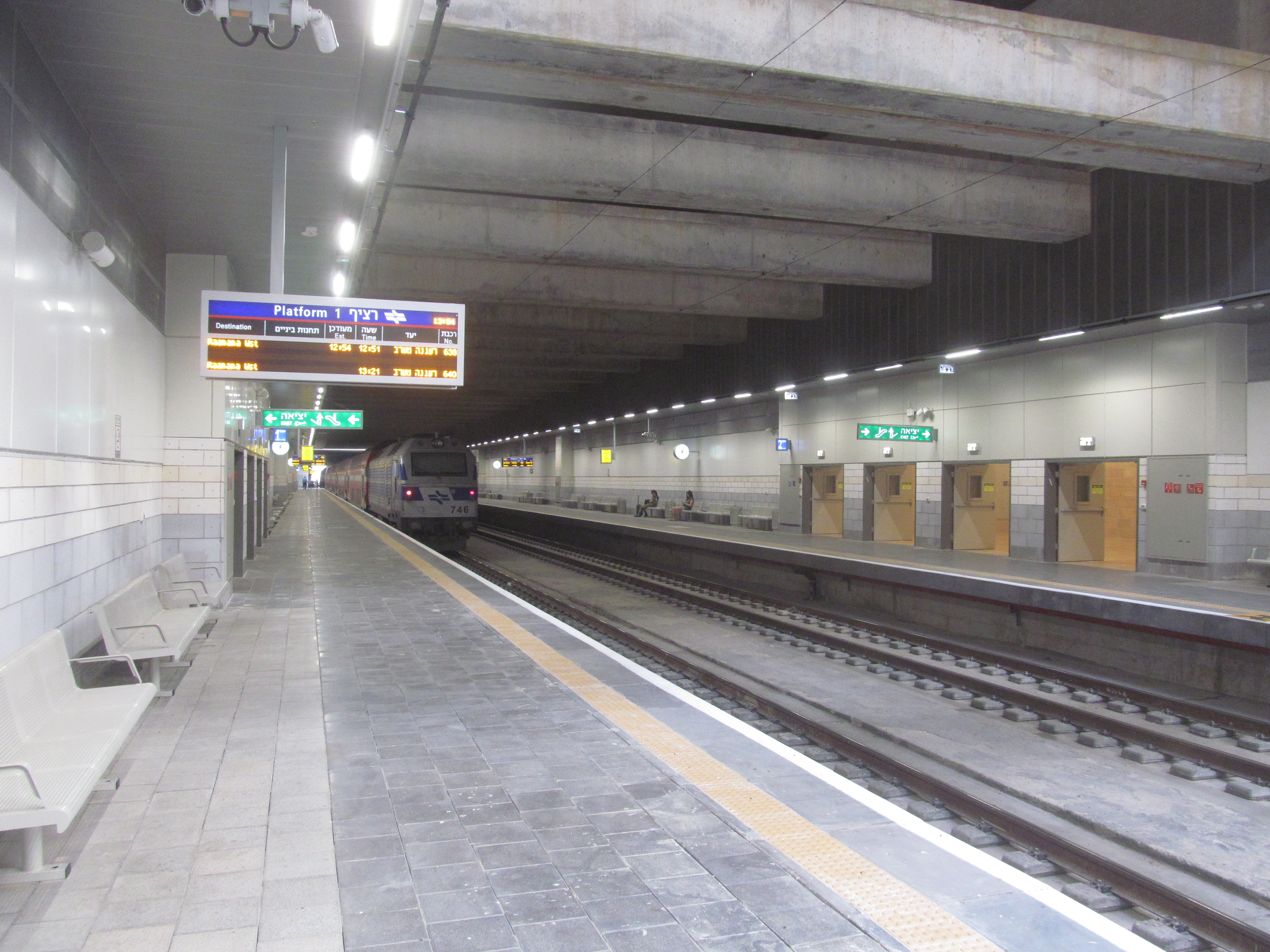
- The underground platforms

General information
- Location: Ra'anana, Israel
- Coordinates: 32°10′22″N 34°53′15″E
- Line: Sharon Railway
- Platforms: 2
- Tracks: 2

Construction
- Parking: No

History
- Opened: 3 July 2018; 8 years ago
- Electrified: 25 December 2021; 4 years ago

Passengers
- 2019: 233,114
- Rank: 65 out of 68
Location

Ra'anana–South railway station is an Israel Railways passenger station at the boundary between Ra'anana, Kfar Saba and Kfar Malal. It serves the residents of the southern Sharon region. The station is located on the Sharon Railway, in the center of the large interchange connecting highways 4 and 531.

The addition of this station and its sister station Ra'anana West will reduce the travel time for Ra'anana and Kfar Saba residents to Tel-Aviv to approximately 11 minutes when the link via Herzliya railway station opens. The two stations were opened on 3 July 2018, and the link via Herzliya is scheduled to open in early 2020.

With only 233,114 passengers recorded in 2019, the station is the least used in the Central District.

== Location ==
The station is located within Highway 531, which was constructed at the same time. The station building is located at ground level east of Highway 4 and north of Highway 531. The station is adjacent to the Ra'anana Junction bus terminal, with buses to Ra'anana, Kfar Saba and the surrounding area.

A pedestrian bridge above Highway 4 is planned in the future, providing additional access to the station from the southeastern neighborhoods of Ra'anana.

== Design ==
The passenger platforms are located underground inside a 1,825 meters-long rail tunnel under Highway 4.

== Train service ==
Preceding station	Israel Railways	Following station
Ra'anana–West towards Herzliya	Herzliya–Ashkelon	Hod HaSharon–Sokolov towards Ashkelon

== Ridership ==
Passengers boarding and disembarking by year
Year	Passengers	Rank	Source
2022	149,799 (▲80,861)	65 of 67	2022 Freedom of Information Law Annual Report
2021	68,938 (▲18,444)	65 of 66	2021 Freedom of Information Law Annual Report
2020	50,494 (▼182,620)	65 of 68	2020 Freedom of Information Law Annual Report
2019	233,114	65 of 68	2019 Freedom of Information Law Annual Report
