= Holon Junction railway station =

Railway station on the Hod Hasharon Sokolov–Beersheba Center line in Israel

Holon Junction צומת חולון
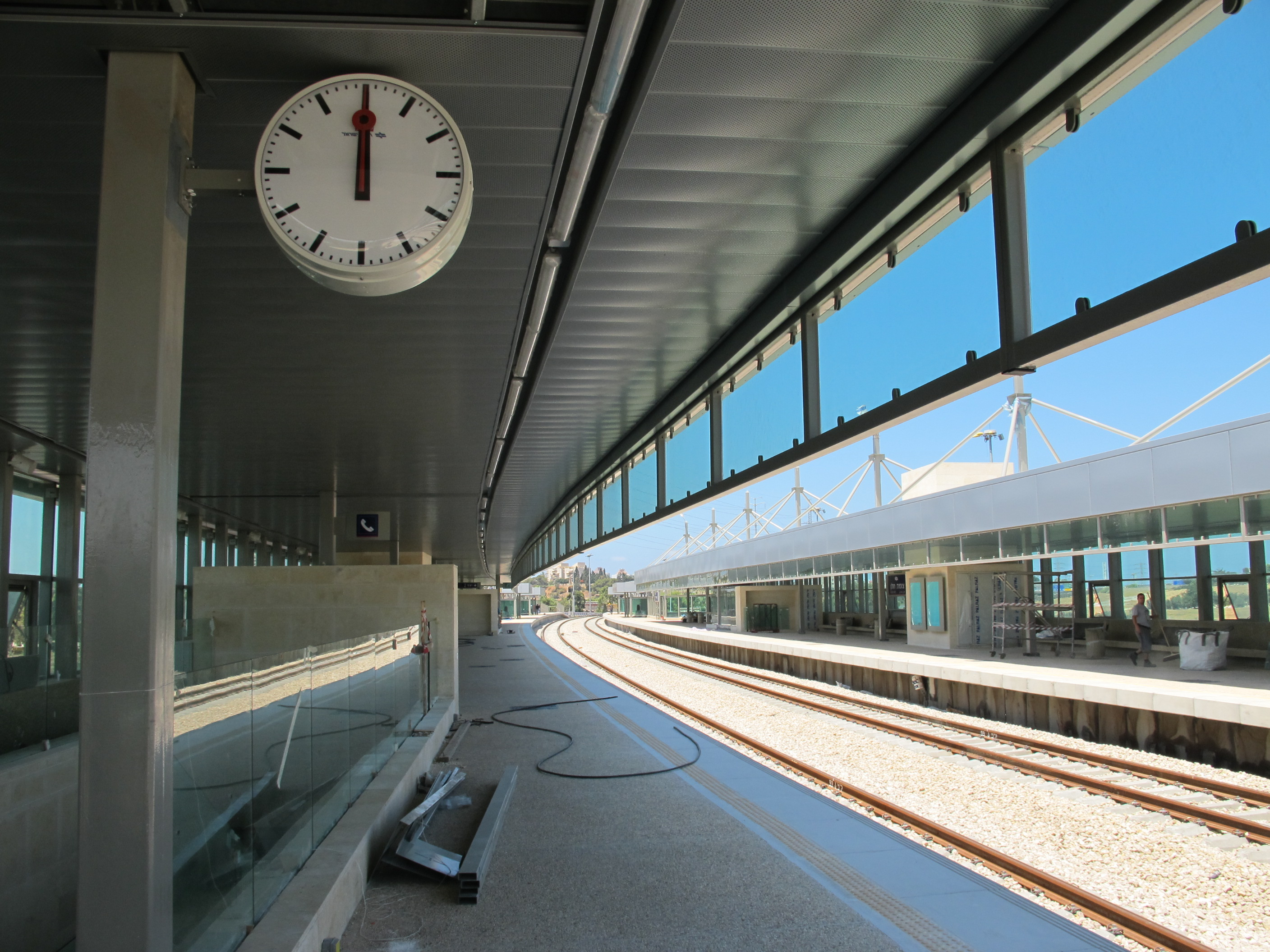

General information
- Coordinates: 32°02′14″N 34°46′36″E

History
- Opened: 25 September 2011; 14 years ago
- Electrified: 25 December 2021; 4 years ago

Passengers
- 2019: 629,715
- Rank: 48 out of 68
Location

Holon Junction railway station is a railway station on the Rosh HaAyin–Beersheba line. The station is located at the Holon Interchange (the intersection of the South Ayalon Highway and Highway 44) which separates Tel Aviv from its southern suburb Holon.

With 629,715 passengers recorded in 2019, it was the least-used station in the Tel Aviv District.

== Train service ==
All trains serving the Rosh HaAyin–Beersheba line stop at this station, as well as at all stations of the line.

On most weekday hours there is a train every 30 minutes each direction. On rush hours there is a train every 15 minutes each direction. Some of the southbound trains terminate at Rishon LeZion Moshe Dayan or Ashkelon and do not continue to Be'er Sheva.

== Public transport connections ==
=== Local service ===
==== From Holon ====
From Holon there are several bus routes in high frequency. The routes stop at Levi Eshkol blvd, except routes 189/289 at their northbound direction that stop at Ben Tzvi Road.

==== From Bat Yam ====
From Bat Yam the station is served by bus route 26.

=== Regional and intercity bus service ===
On highway 44 there is a big number of regional bus routes and intercity bus routes but most of them are regular buses and some of them have low frequency.

Preceding station	Israel Railways	Following station
Tel Aviv–HaHagana towards Herzliya	Herzliya–Ashkelon	Holon–Wolfson towards Ashkelon
