= Kfar Saba–Nordau railway station =

Railway station in Israel

Kfar Saba–Nordau כפר סבא – נורדאו
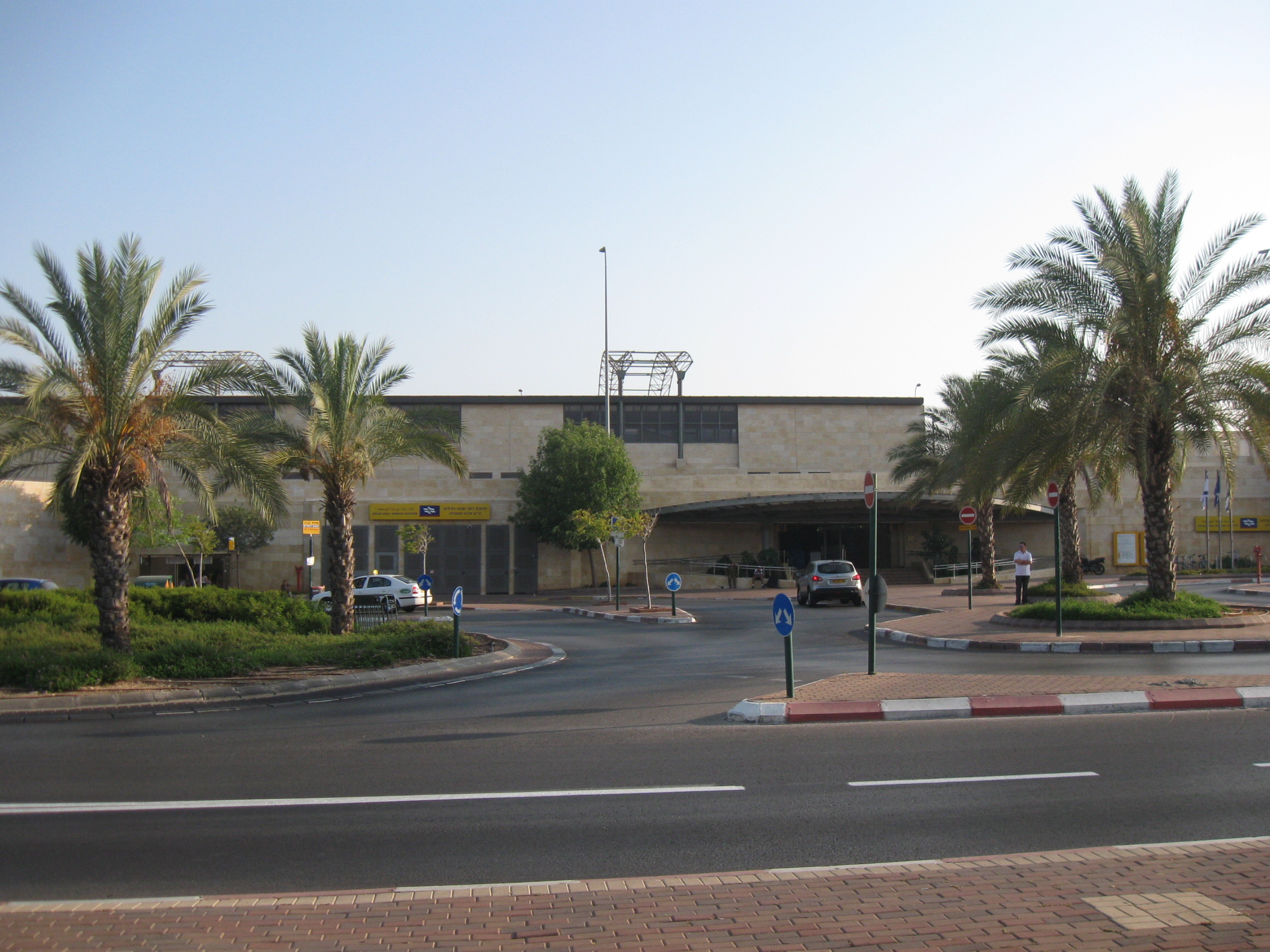
- The main entrance in 2010

General information
- Location: Kfar Saba, Israel
- Coordinates: 32.167566°N 34.916525°E
- Line: Sharon Railway
- Platforms: 2
- Tracks: 2

Construction
- Accessible: yes

History
- Opened: 13 April 2003; 23 years ago
- Electrified: 25 December 2021; 4 years ago
- Former names: 2003–2006: Hod haSharon–Kfar Saba

Passengers
- 2019: 1,373,963
- Rank: 32 out of 68
Location

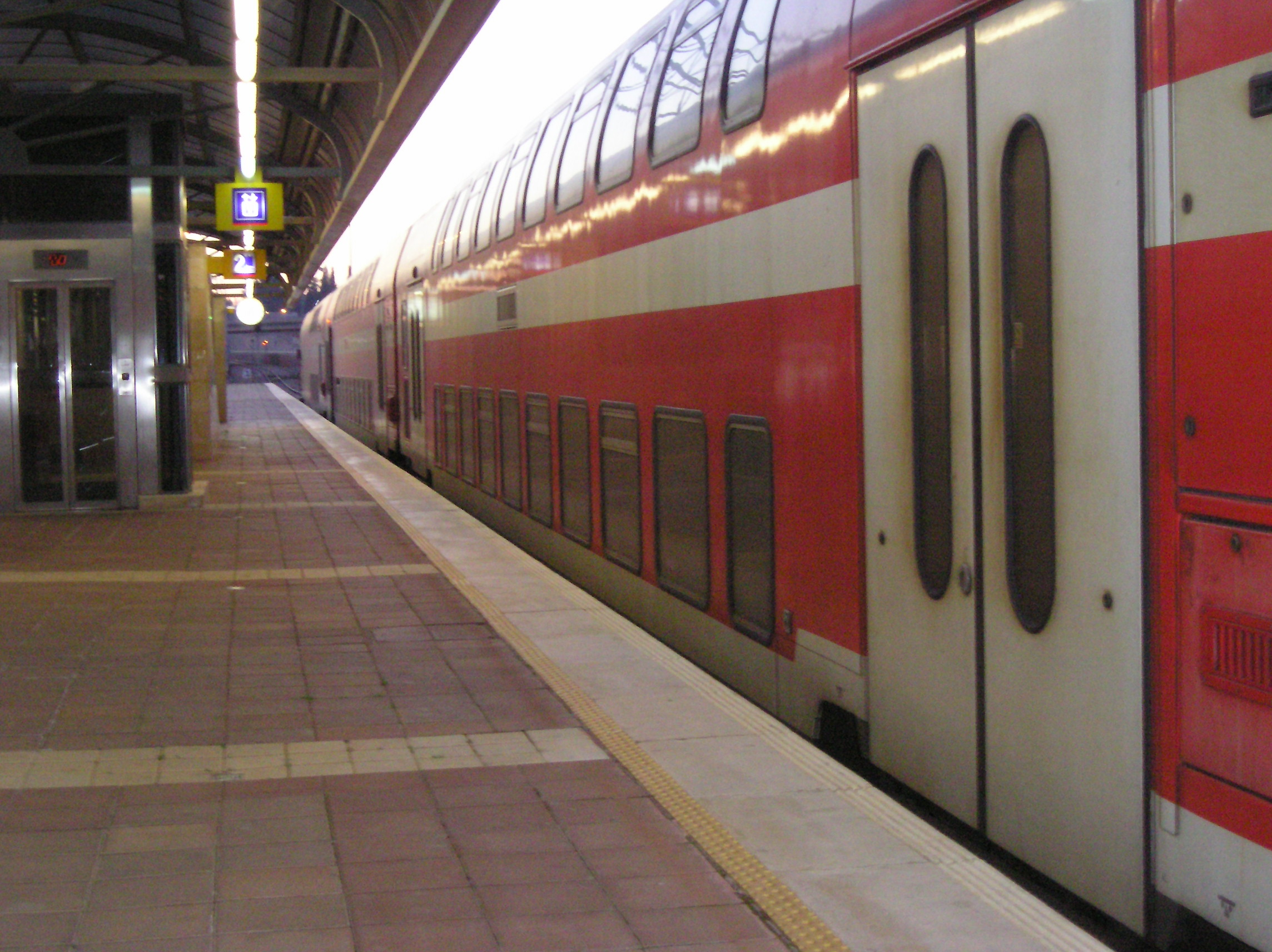
A train parking at the railway station in 2009

Kfar Saba–Nordau railway station (also known as Kostyuk) is a passenger railway station located at the city boundary of Hod HaSharon, Israel and Kfar Saba, Israel. The station was opened on 13 April 2003 as the beginning of the new Sharon Railway. Eleven days later, on 24 April 2003, a suicide bomber approached the new train station and activated the bomb he was carrying, murdering Oleksandr Kostiuk, the security guard who had prompted him for identification, and wounding 13 others. The station was later named after Kostiuk who prevented the bomber from entering the station.

The station platforms are located in the median of Route 531 which separates Kfar Saba from Hod HaSharon; the only access to the platforms is via the station building on HaTsabarim St at Kfar Saba's side of the highway. Accordingly, the station is named "Kfar Saba", even though HaTsabarim St, including the station itself, is within the municipal boundaries of Hod HaSharon. Between September 2006 and March 2010, the station was named Hod Hasharon station.

== Train service ==
Preceding station	Israel Railways	Following station
Hod HaSharon–Sokolov towards Herzliya	Herzliya–Ashkelon	Rosh HaAyin–North towards Ashkelon

== Ridership ==
Passengers boarding and disembarking by year
Year	Passengers	Rank	Source
2021	398,644 (▲112,539)	42 of 66 (▲1)	2021 Freedom of Information Law Annual Report
2020	286,105 (▼ -1,087,858)	43 of 68 (▼11)	2020 Freedom of Information Law Annual Report
2019	1,373,963	32 of 68	2019 Freedom of Information Law Annual Report
