= Holon–Wolfson railway station =

Railway station on the Hod Hasharon Sokolov–Sderot line in Israel

Holon-Wolfson חולון – וולפסון حولون – ڤولفسون
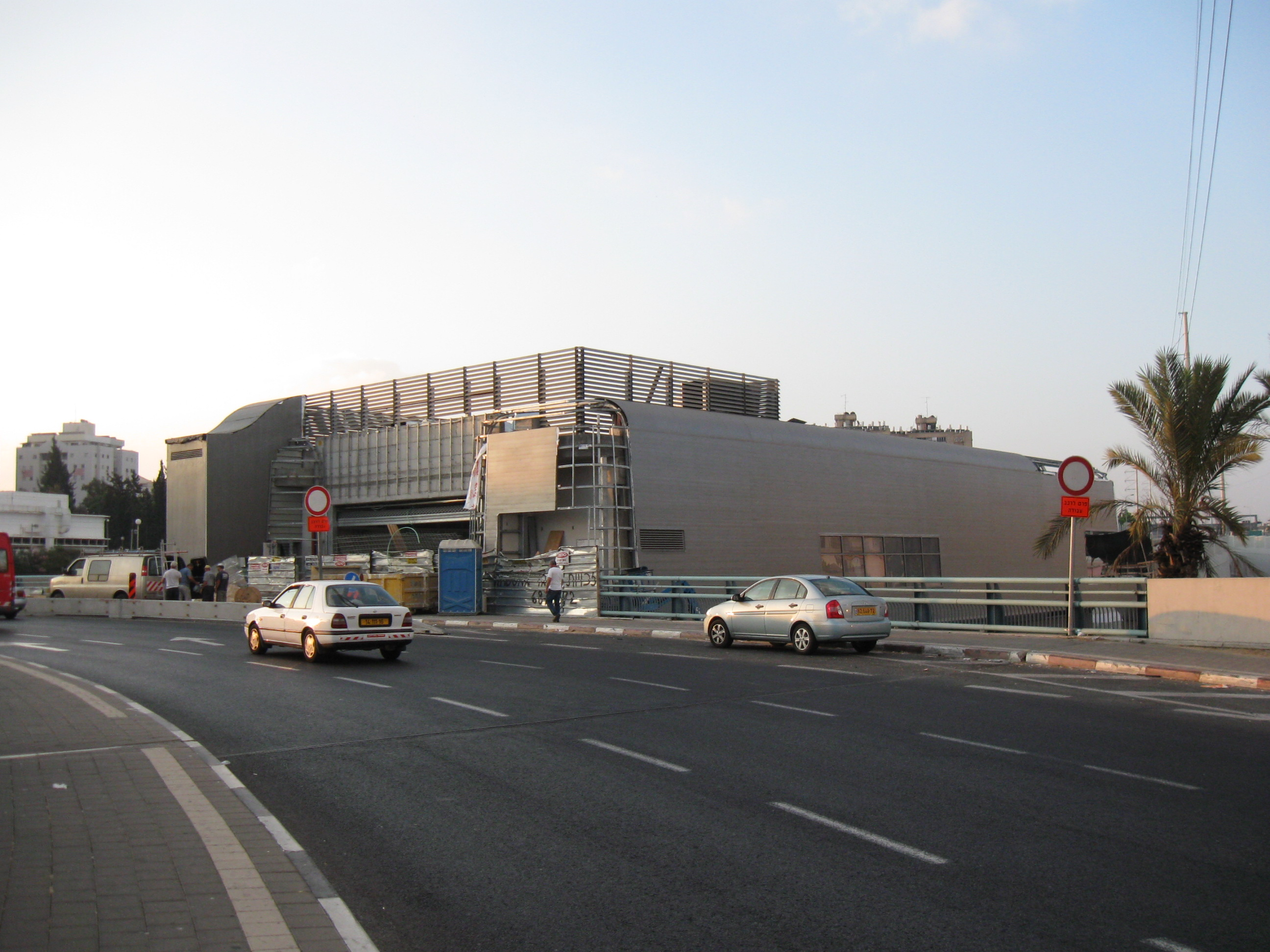

General information
- Coordinates: 32°02′07″N 34°45′35″E

History
- Opened: 25 September 2011; 14 years ago
- Electrified: 25 December 2021; 4 years ago

Passengers
- 2019: 823,403
- Rank: 45 out of 68
Location

Holon–Wolfson railway station is a railway station on the border of Holon and Jaffa in the south of Tel Aviv-Yafo Municipality, on the Rosh HaAyin–Beersheba line. The station is in the Wolfson interchange on the Ayalon Highway, nearby Wolfson Medical Center.

== Train service ==
All trains serving the Rosh HaAyin–Beersheba line stop at this station, as well as at all stations of the line.

On most weekday hours there is a train every 30 minutes each direction. On rush hours there is a train every 15 minutes each direction. Some of the southbound trains terminate at Rishon LeZion Moshe Dayan or Ashkelon and do not continue to Be'er Sheva.

== Public transport connections ==
Nearby the station and Wolfson Medical Center, there is a bus terminal with local bus routes that link the station to Holon, Bat Yam, Rishon LeZion and southern Tel Aviv. On the terminal itself you can't enter the bus and you need to wait to the bus at the entrance of Wolfson Medical Center.

Preceding station	Israel Railways	Following station
Holon Junction towards Herzliya	Herzliya–Ashkelon	Bat Yam–Yoseftal towards Ashkelon
