= Sharon Railway =

Coordinates: 32°10′6.18″N 34°54′35.54″E

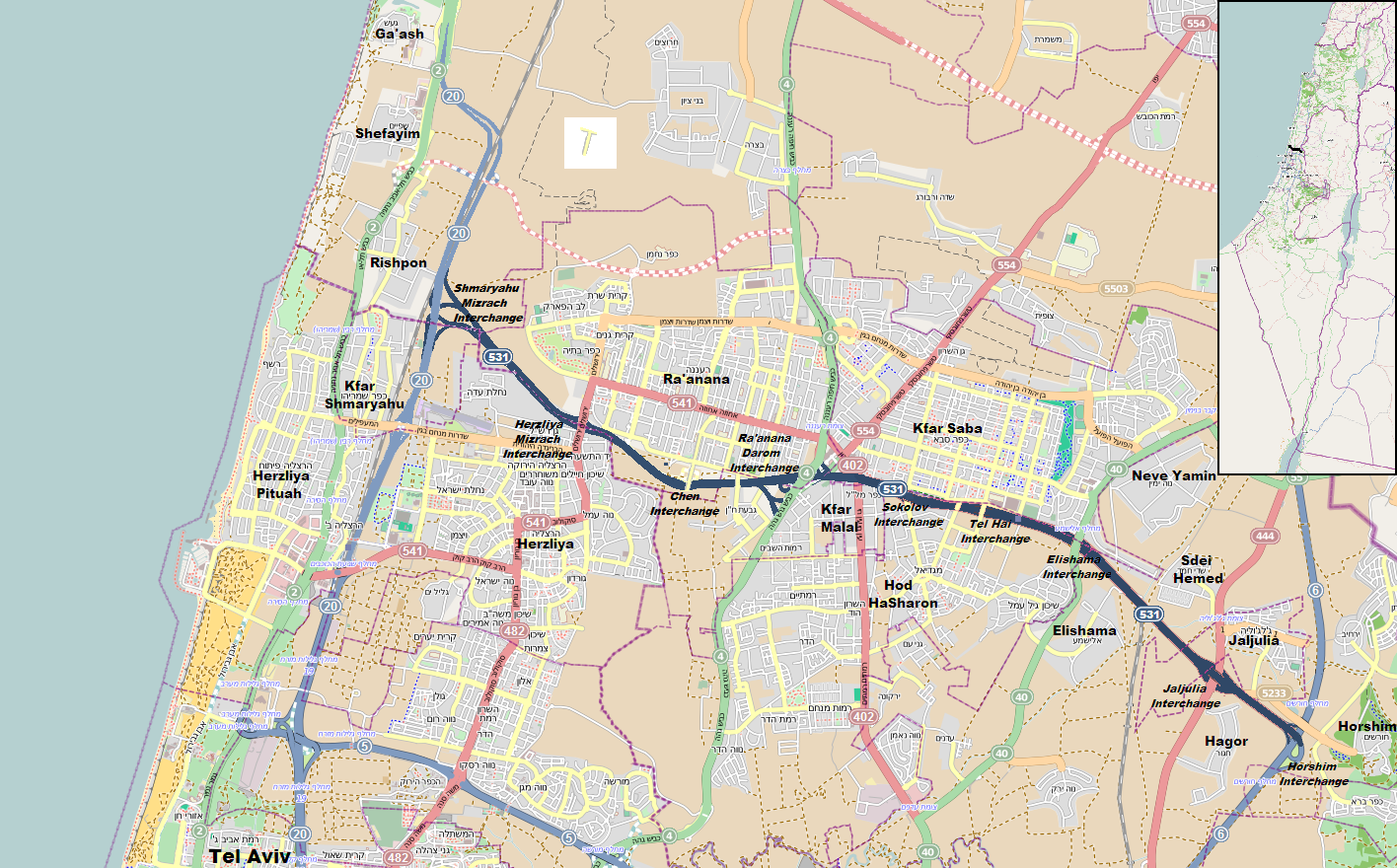
The Sharon Railway is located in the median of Highway 531 between Kfar Saba and Herzliya

Sharon Railway (Hebrew: מסילת השרון, romanized: mesilat ha-šaron) is a 12 km double-track railroad in the Sharon plain area of Israel, located in the median of Highway 531. It serves as a connection between the Coastal Railway and the Eastern Railway and runs parallel to the Yarkon Railway which is located approximately 7km to the south. In the vicinity of Ra'anana South interchange (where Highway 531 meets Highway 4), the Sharon Railway passes through a 1.8km long tunnel.

The construction of both the highway and the railway started in the early 2000s, and the first station on the new line, Kfar Saba–Nordau, opened on 13 April 2003. The second station, Hod Hasharon Sokolov, opened on 2 September 2006.

Two additional stations, Ra'anana South and Ra'anana West, opened on 3 July 2018 as part of a larger construction project to extend Highway 531 to the Coastal Highway. The project also included quadruple-tracking the section of the Coastal Railway between Tel Aviv University and Herzliya, which previously consisted of double-track since the late 1980s. The connection to the Coastal Railway opened on 5 July 2020, with hourly service between Kfar Saba–Nordau and Herzliya. Eventually, the service frequency is expected to be increased and extended to Tel Aviv, making it possible to reduce the travel time between Ra'anana and Tel Aviv Savidor Center from 40 to 20 minutes.

Works to electrify the railway began in the fall of 2020 and were completed in late 2021.
