= Ashdod–Ad Halom–Metropol railway station =

Railway station in Ashdod, Israel

Ashdod–Ad Halom–Metropol אשדוד – עד הלום – מטרופול
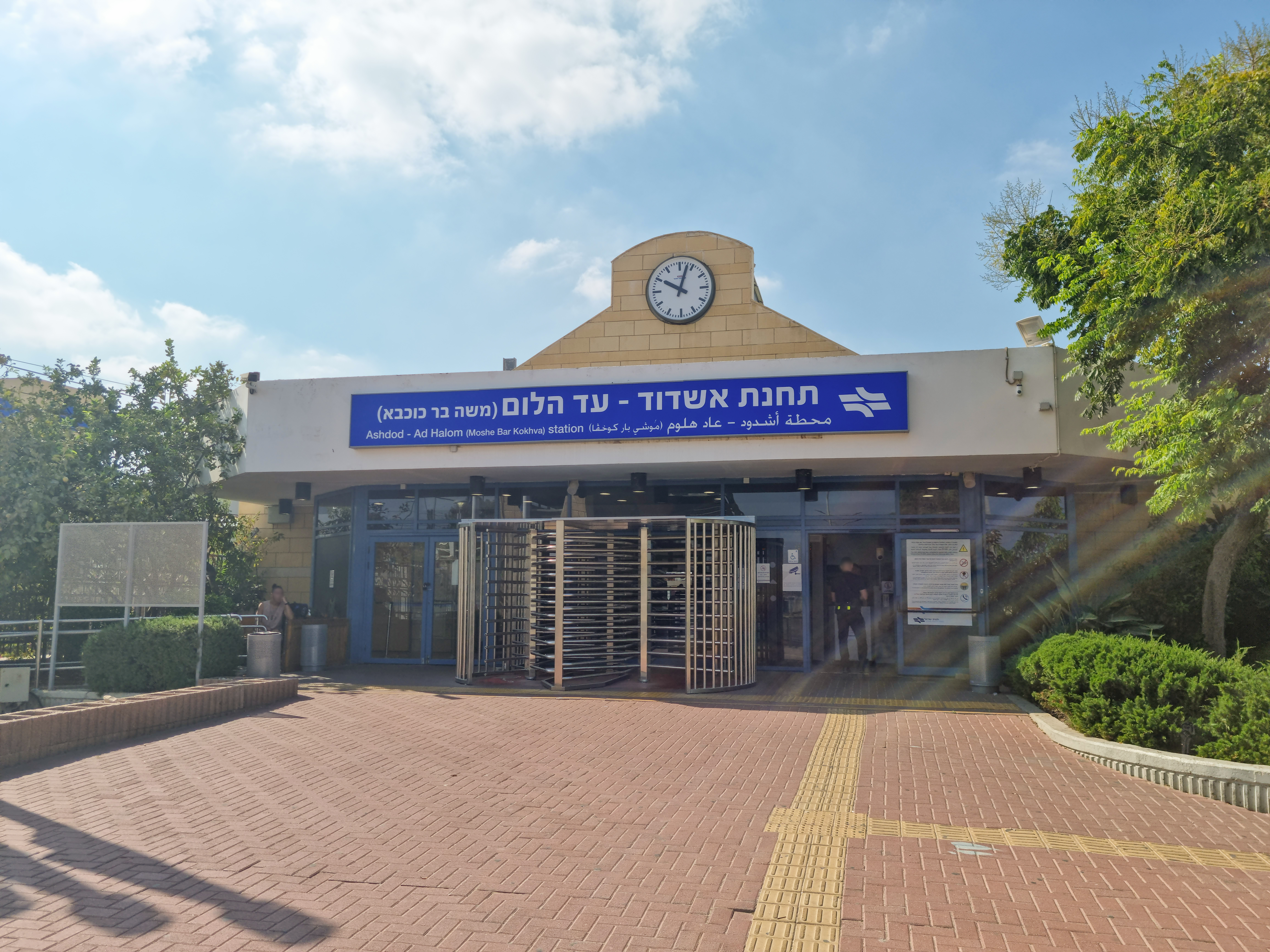
- 2023

General information
- Location: Derech HaRakevent Rd., Ashdod
- Coordinates: 31°46′26″N 34°39′57″E
- Platforms: 3

Construction
- Parking: 300 spaces
- Cycle facilities: 40 spaces
- Accessible: yes

History
- Opened: March 1917; 109 years ago
- Closed: 1947–1995
- Rebuilt: 1995, 2003
- Electrified: 25 December 2021; 4 years ago
- Former names: 1917–1947: Isdud

Passengers
- 2019: 3,765,864
- Rank: 8 out of 68
Location

Ashdod–Ad Halom–Metropol (Note: The name of the railway station has been changed twice. It was called "Ashdod – Ad Halom" when it was built, and in 2009 it was also named after Moshe Bar-Kochba. In 2026, it was renamed "Ashdod – Ad Halom – Metropol", after the new Metropol quarter in which the station is located ("Kiryat Peres" or "The Special Quarter", in the past).) railway station (Hebrew: אשדוד – עד הלום – מטרופול) is a railway station in Ashdod, Israel. It is served by the Binyamina–Tel Aviv–Ashkelon and the Ra'anana–Tel Aviv–Ashkelon–Beersheba suburban lines. Ashdod Ad Halom Station was opened in June 1995 and was fully rebuilt in 2003. Between 1917 and 1947, a small station serving the town of Isdud had also operated at the site, constructed by the British on the Rafah–Gaza–Lydda line.

The station is located in the Ad Halom area, near the southeastern entrance to Ashdod. It sits adjacent to the BIG Terminal bus station, named after the nearby BIG shopping center. The station is served by BRT Line 1, which connects to the central bus station in the City/HaKirya Quarter via a circular route.

Until 2013 the travel time from the station to Tel Aviv was 45 minutes. However, since the completion of the new railway through Holon and the new Yavne West Railway Station on 4 August 2013 the travel time from Tel Aviv to the station has been reduced to approximately 35 minutes in each direction. The station was electrified in February 2021.

The station contains a small beverage and refreshment kiosk.

== Notes ==
Preceding station	Israel Railways	Following station
Yavne–East towards Binyamina	Binyamina–Beersheba	Ashkelon towards Be'er Sheva–Center
Yavne–West towards Herzliya	Herzliya–Ashkelon	Ashkelon Terminus
