= Route 541 (Israel) =

Route in Israel

Route 541
- כביש 541
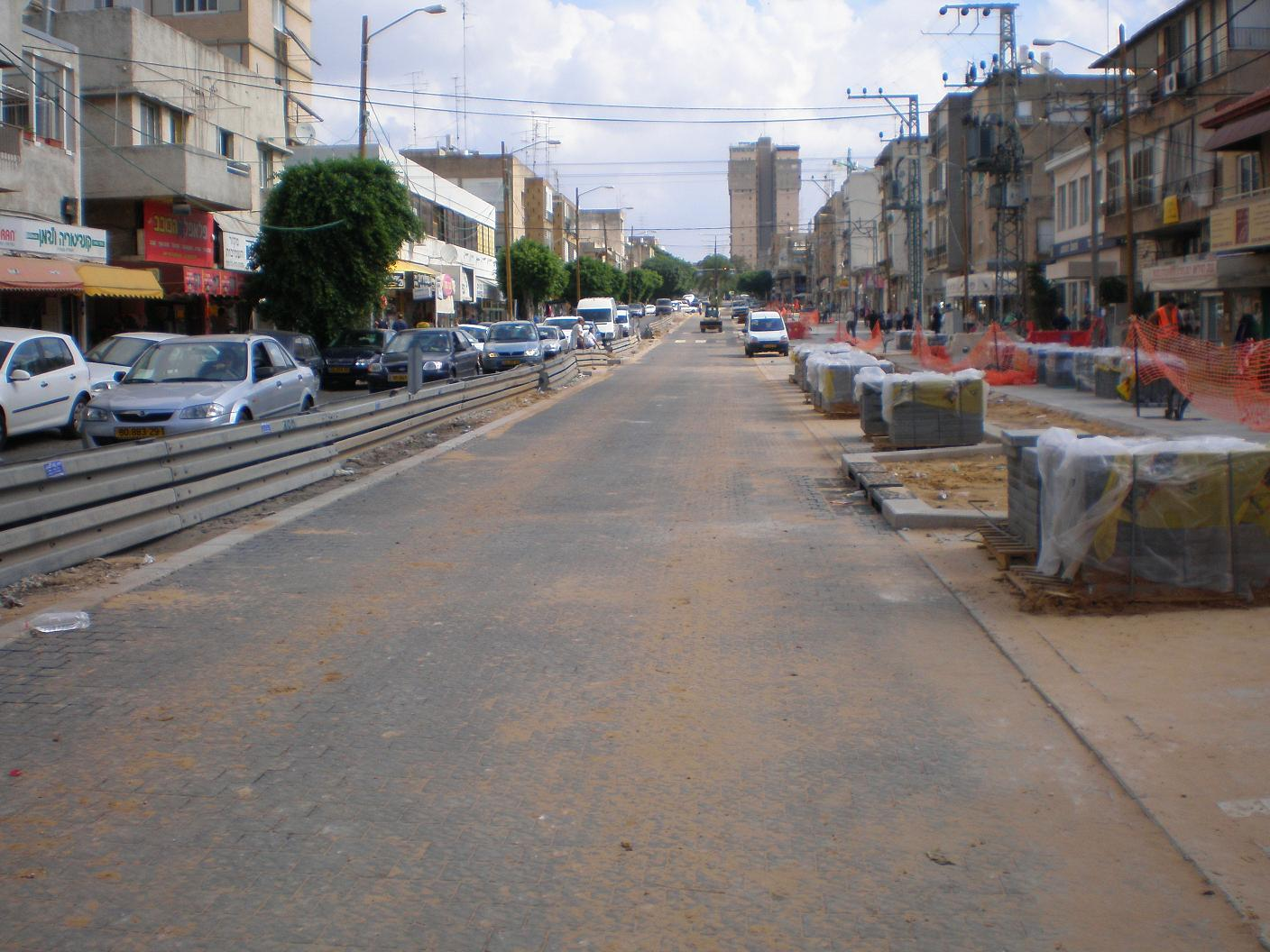
- Route 541 in the center of Herzliya, during construction to turn it into a Pedestrian zone

Route information
- Length: 10.26 km (6.38 mi)

Major junctions
- West end: HaSira Interchange
- East end: Highway 91

Location
- Country: Israel

Highway system
- Roads in Israel; Highways
← Route 531	→ Route 551

Route 541 is a north–south regional highway in central Israel. It begins at the HaSira Interchange and ends at Ra'anana Junction with Highway 4.

== Interchanges and Junctions (West to East) ==
District	Location	km	mi	Name	Destinations	Notes
Tel Aviv	Herzliya	0.00	0.00	מחלף הסירה (HaSira Interchange)	Highway 2	
Tel Aviv	Herzliya	0.60	0.37	מחלף שבעת הכוכבים (The Seven Stars Interchange)	Highway 20	
Tel Aviv	Herzliya	1.41	0.88	צומת ז'בוטינסקי (Jabotinsky Junction)	Jabotinsky Street; Yitzhak Shamir Street	
Tel Aviv	Herzliya	3.10	1.93	צומת כדורי (Kaduri Junction)	Route 482	
Tel Aviv	Herzliya	4.95	3.08	צומת סוקולוב (Sokolov Junction)	Sokolov Street	
Tel Aviv	Herzliya	5.89	3.66		HaBrigada HaYehudit Street	
Central	Ra'anana; Herzliya	6.25	3.88	מחלף הרצליה מזרח (East Herzliya Interchange)	Route 531	
Central	Ra'anana	7.63	4.74	צומת המלכים (HaMelachim Junction)	HaMelachim Street	
Central	Ra'anana	8.68	5.39	צומת בן גוריון (Ben Gurion Junction)	Ben Gurion Street	
Central	Ra'anana	10.26	6.38	צומת רעננה (Ra'anana Junction)	Highway 4 Route 402	
1.000 mi = 1.609 km; 1.000 km = 0.621 mi
