= Hod HaSharon–Sokolov railway station =

Passenger railway station in Israel

Hod Hasharon–Sokolov הוד השרון – סוקולוב
- Train on platform no. 1 preparing to leave towards HaRishonim station (Before the relocation of the line to the Southern Ayalon railway and its extension to Ra'anana)

General information
- Location: Hod HaSharon, Israel
- Coordinates: 32°10′12″N 34°54′09″E
- Line: Sharon Railway
- Platforms: 2
- Tracks: 2

History
- Opened: 2 September 2006; 19 years ago
- Electrified: 25 December 2021; 4 years ago

Passengers
- 2019: 926,654
- Rank: 41 out of 68
Location
- Location within Israel

Hod Hasharon–Sokolov railway station is a passenger railway station located at the town boundary of Hod HaSharon and Kfar Saba, Israel. Until July 2018 it was the northern terminus of the suburban line to Beersheba via Tel Aviv. The station was opened on 2 September 2006 as Kfar Saba–Merkaz; at the same time, the neighbouring Kfar Saba–Nordau railway station was renamed Hod HaSharon station. On 6 March 2010, both stations were renamed to their present names.

The station is located on Sokolov St, at the junction with HaTayasim St. In December 2006, the station served a daily average of 1860 passengers.

As part of the extending the Sharon Railway westwards, in July 2018 the rail tracks were extended to the new Ra'anana South railway station from which the railway was extended in 2020 to the Coastal Railway. This connection provides a slightly shorter alternative route to Tel Aviv, via Herzelya, and also enables changing trains to trains reaching northern destinations (such as Netanya and Haifa) on the rail network.

== Train service ==
Preceding station	Israel Railways	Following station
Ra'anana–South towards Herzliya	Herzliya–Ashkelon	Kfar Saba–Nordau towards Ashkelon

== Ridership ==
Passengers boarding and disembarking by year
Year	Passengers	Rank	Source
2021	247,703 (▲61,752)	53 of 66 (▼4)	2021 Freedom of Information Law Annual Report
2020	185,951 (▼740,703)	49 of 68 (▼1)	2020 Freedom of Information Law Annual Report
2019	926,654	41 of 68	2019 Freedom of Information Law Annual Report

== Facilities ==
Facilities present at the station are:

- Payphone
- One ticket cashier
- Two ticket machines
- Escalators
- Lifts
- Buffet
- Car park
- Toilets
