= Beersheba Light Rail =

Planned light rail system in Beersheba, Israel

The Beersheba Light Rail is a planned light rail system for the city of Beersheba, Israel.

Plans for a light rail system in Beersheba, including in the master plan for the city, go back decades. In 1998, an agreement for the planning of a light rail system was signed and mayor Yaakov Turner announced the following year that it would begin to run in 2003, but this did not happen. In 2008, the Israeli Finance Ministry contemplated freezing the Tel Aviv Light Rail project and building a light rail system in Beersheba instead but did not follow through. In 2014, mayor Ruvik Danilovich announced that a light rail system would be built in the city. In 2017, the Ministry of Transport gave the Beersheba municipality approval to proceed with preliminary planning on a light rail system. On 14 August 2023, the light rail system was approved.

Under the current plans, the light rail will consist of a single 25 kilometer long line. It will serve railway stations and the city's central bus station, the city center, Ben-Gurion University of the Negev, and Soroka Medical Center, and extend to neighboring communities, with the line's route parallel to Highway 60, serving the military intelligence base complex being constructed at Likit which is expected to open in 2028, the towns of Omer, Lakiya, and Meitar, and terminating at the Meitar Crossing near the Green Line. The location of the light rail's depot will be selected after an environmental impact assessment. The project is expected to be completed in 2033 and cost an estimated 8 billion NIS ($2.11 billion).
