= Ra'anana–West railway station =

Railway station in Israel

Ra'anana–West רעננה – מערב
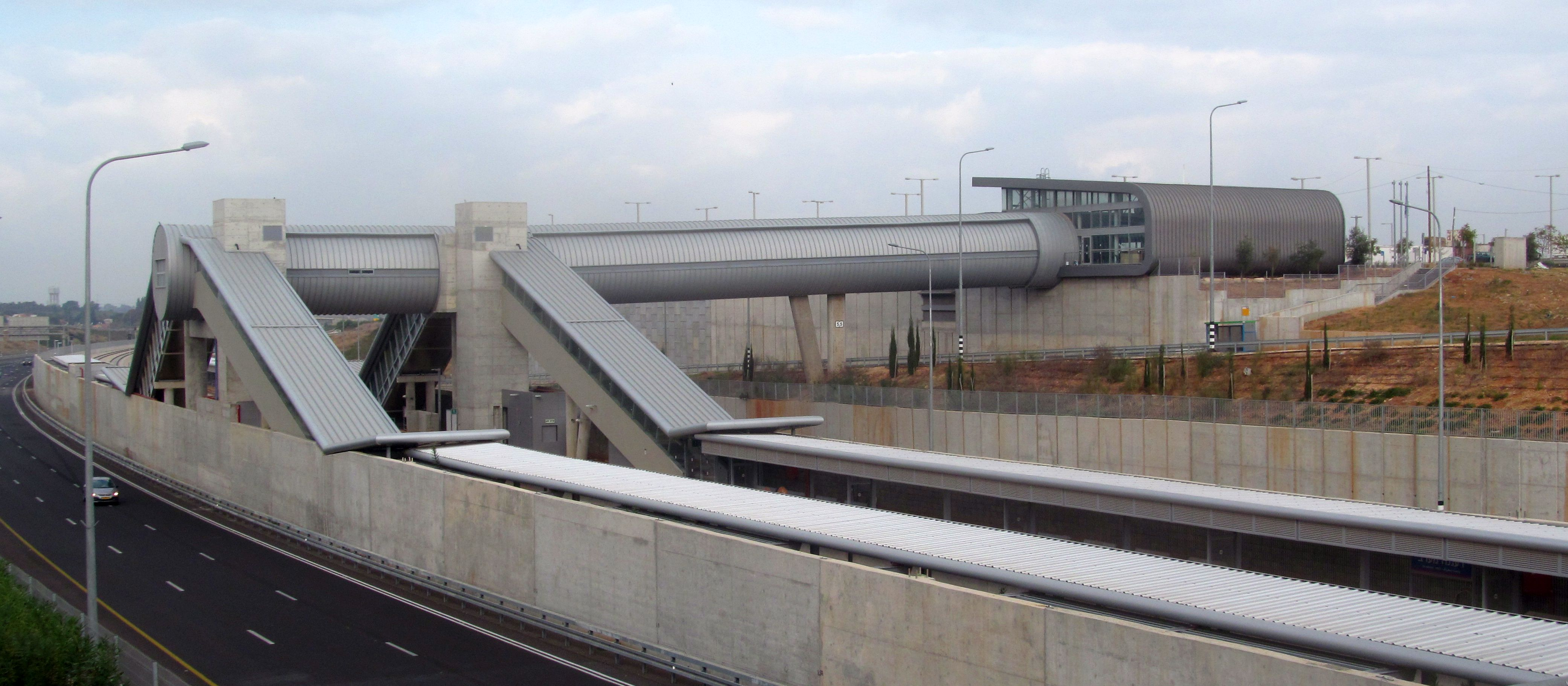
- Station building, footbridge, and platform canopies

General information
- Location: Herzliya Mizrach Interchange, Ra'anana, Israel
- Coordinates: 32°10′49″N 34°51′03″E
- Line: Sharon Railway
- Platforms: 2
- Tracks: 2

Construction
- Parking: 300 places (Free)

History
- Opened: 3 July 2018; 8 years ago
- Electrified: 25 December 2021; 4 years ago

Passengers
- 2019: 265,006
- Rank: 62 out of 68
Location

Ra'anana–West railway station (Hebrew: תחנת הרכבת רעננה – מערב, Tahanat HaRakevet Ra'anana–Ma'arav; Arabic: محطة رعنانا – غرب) is an Israel Railways passenger station in Ra'anana, located at Derech Yerushalayim.

The addition of this station and its sister station Ra'anana South, is intended to reduce travel time for Ra'anana residents to Tel-Aviv to approximately 11 minutes. The station was scheduled to open on 1 July 2018 but was delayed till 3 July.

== Location ==
The station building is located at ground level, west of Route 541 (Jerusalem Avenue) and north of Highway 531, and is accessible only from the Ra'anana side of the highway.

The station building is of the shape of a book lying on its side. Its floor area is 600m², and is connected through a 50m footbridge to the platforms, which are below ground. Each platform is 300m long.

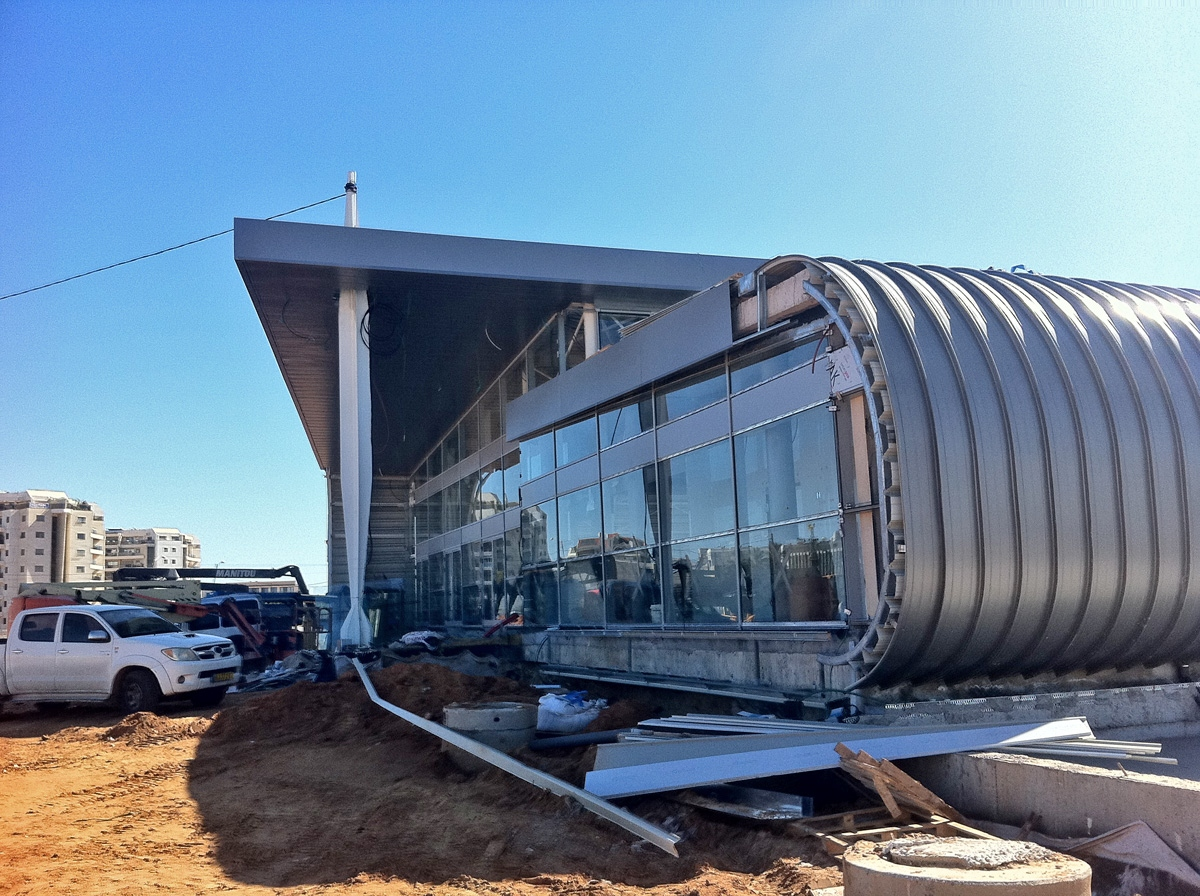
The station during construction

== Train service ==
Preceding station	Israel Railways	Following station
Herzliya Terminus	Herzliya–Ashkelon	Ra'anana–South towards Ashkelon

== Ridership ==
Passengers boarding and disembarking by year
Year	Passengers	Rank	Source
2021	120,302 (▲61,420)	64 of 66	2021 Freedom of Information Law Annual Report
2020	58,882 (▼206,124)	64 of 68 (▼2)	2020 Freedom of Information Law Annual Report
2019	265,006	62 of 68	2019 Freedom of Information Law Annual Report
