= Route 531 (Israel) =

Route in Israel

Coordinates: 32°10′6.18″N 34°54′35.54″E

Route 531
- כביש 531
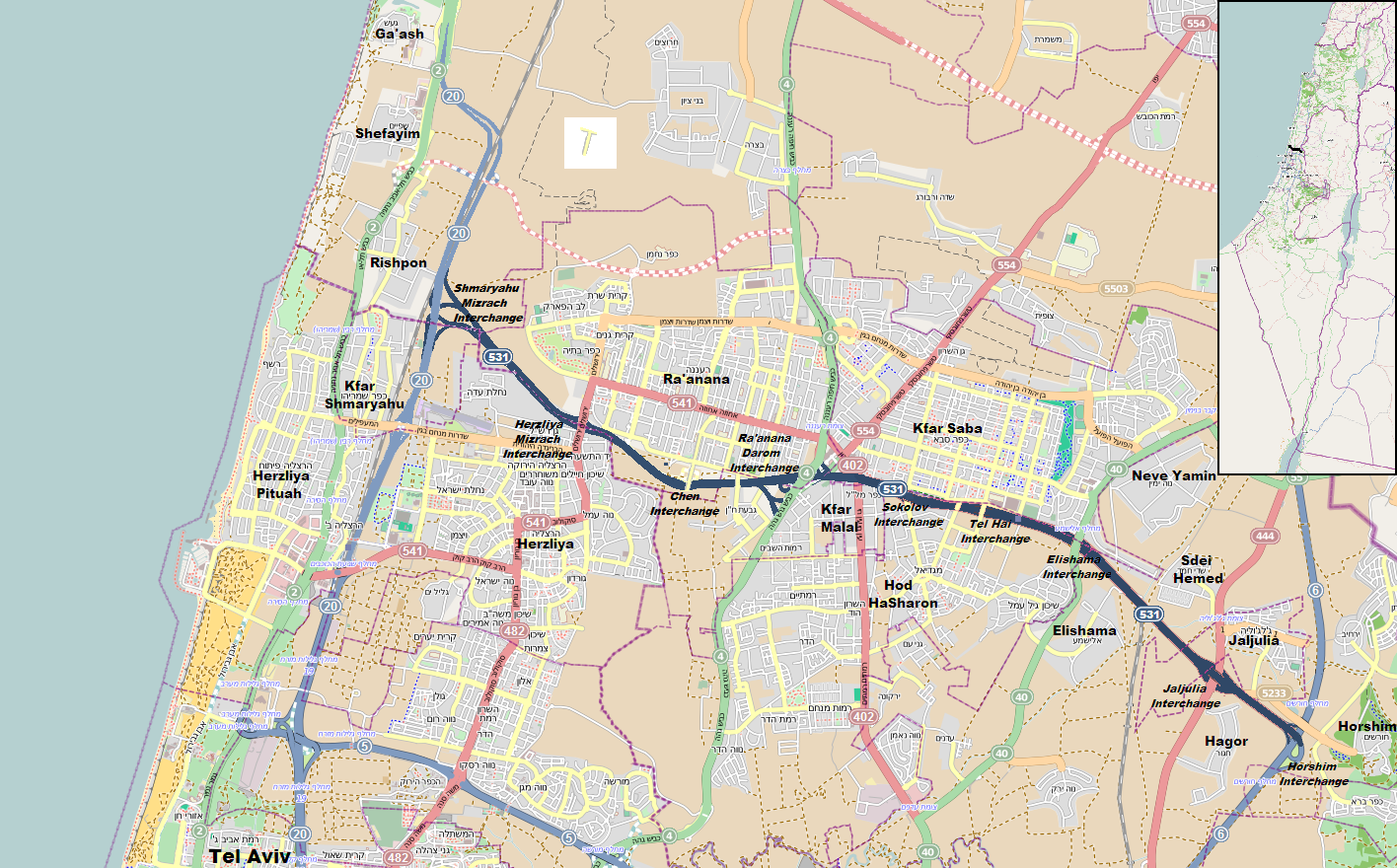

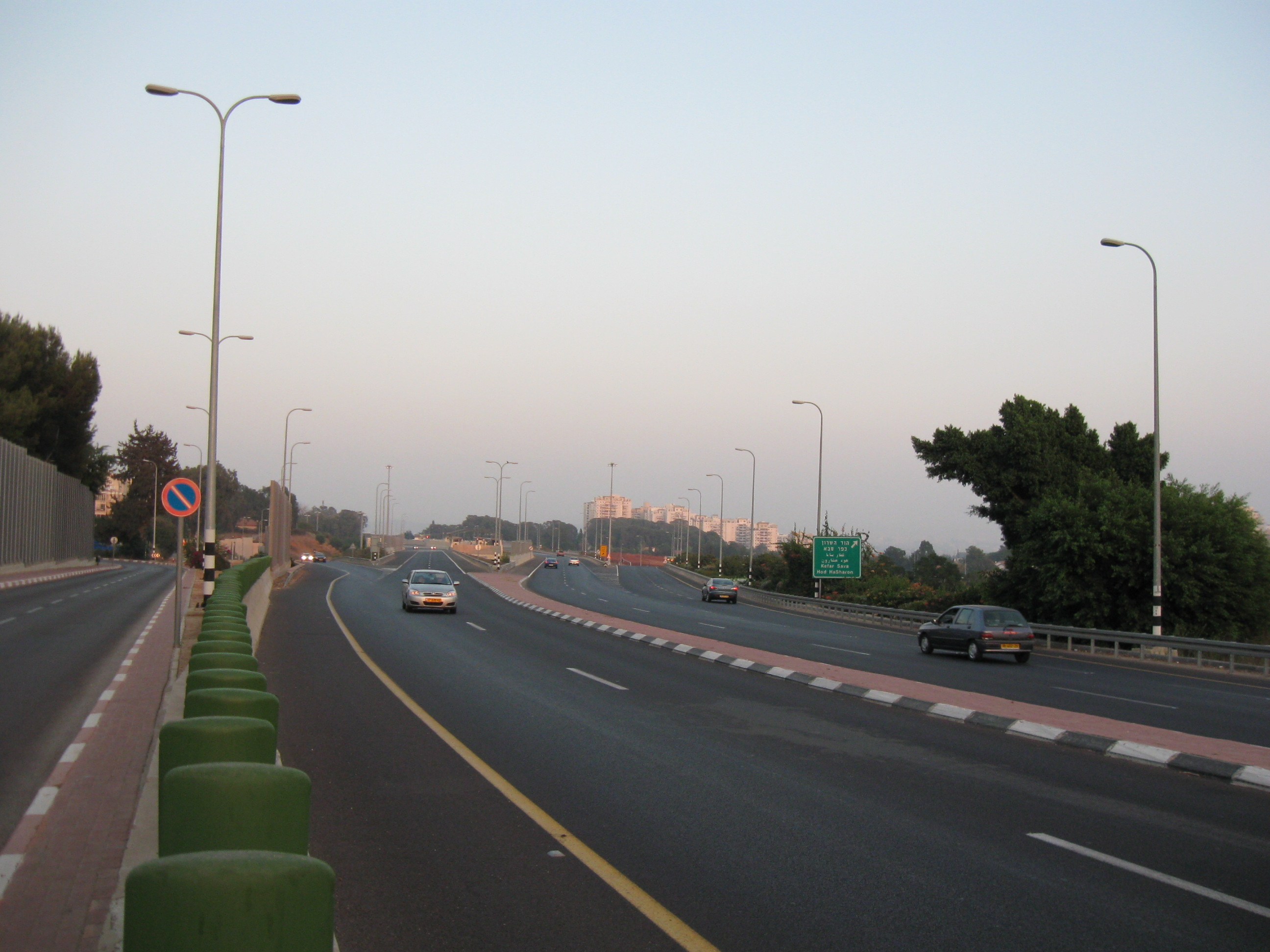
- Route 531 just before its current western end

Route information
- Length: 15.2 km (9.4 mi)

Major junctions
- West end: East Shmaryahu Interchange
- Sokolov Interchange; Tel Hai Interchange; Elishama Interchange; Jaljulia Junction
- East end: Horshim Interchange

Location
- Country: Israel
- Major cities: (Rishpon), (Kfar Shmaryahu), (Herzliya), Ra'anana, Kfar Malal, Kfar Saba, Elishama, Jaljulia, Horshim

Highway system
- Roads in Israel; Highways
← Route 508	→ Route 541

Route 531 (Hebrew: כביש 531), is a suburban freeway in the southern Sharon region of Israel, just north of the Tel Aviv Metropolitan Area. The highway begins at Highway 6 and terminates at the Ayalon Highway with an extension to the Coastal Highway.

The highway's easternmost section was constructed on October 16, 2014, while parts of the extension of the highway to the Ayalon Highway in Herzliya opened starting in 2016.

== Herzliya–Ra'anana extension ==
Initially, the highway terminated east of Ra'anana. In 2008, a PFI tender was issued to continue constructing the highway westward from Ra'anana towards Highway 20 (Ayalon Highway) near the Mediterranean coast. By doing so, it will pass nearby several large cities and connect all the major north–south highways in the region: Highway 6, Highway 4 and Highway 20. The project also includes extending Highway 20 several kilometres northwards, connecting it and Route 531 to Highway 2 (the Coastal Highway) heading northbound at a new interchange near Ga'ash. Its main section includes three travel lanes in each direction and two massive interchanges – at Ra'anana South (with Highway 4), and with the Ayalon Highway (Highway 20), plus a few smaller interchanges.

In addition, the project includes extending Sharon Railway with a double-track railway, including a long railway tunnel and several passenger stations in the median of the highway along nearly the entire length of the road, using a design similar to that of the Route 431 suburban freeway. The new railway section will connect Ra'anana West railway station to the Coastal Railway.

Shapir Engineering initially won the PFI tender to extend the road and railway. Still, due to financial disagreements and complications caused by the worldwide financial crisis, the government cancelled the PFI tender in the summer of 2010. Instead, the project was reorganized and funded directly by the treasury and managed by the National Roads Company. It was split off into several sections, each of which was tendered separately at an estimated total cost of NIS 4 billion (equivalent to slightly over US$1 billion). This move postponed completion by six years to 2019, although completed parts of the highway have been opened to traffic in stages starting in 2016.

== Interchanges and Junctions (West to East) ==
District	Location	km	mi	Name	Destinations	Notes
Central	Rishpon	0	0.0	מחלף שמריהו מזרח (East Shmaryahu Interchange)	Highway 20	
Central	Ra'anana; Herzliya	3.9	2.4	מחלף הרצליה מזרח (East Herzliya Interchange)	Route 541	
Central	Ra'anana	5.6	3.5	מחלף ח"ן (Khen Interchange)	Ben Gurion Street	
Central	Ramot HaShavim	7.1	4.4	מחלף רעננה דרום (South Ra'anana Interchange)	Highway 4 Route 554	
Central	Kfar Malal	8	5.0	מחלף מל"ל (Malal Interchange)	Route 402	
Central	Kfar Saba	8.7	5.4	מחלף סוקולוב (Sokolov Interchange)	Sokolov Street	
Central	Hod HaSharon	9.8	6.1	מחלף תל חי (Tel Hai Interchange)	Tel Hai Street	
Central	Elishama	11.2	7.0	מחלף אלישמע (Elishama Interchange)	Highway 40	
Central	Jaljulia	13.8	8.6	מחלף ג'לג'וליה (Jaljulia Interchange)	Route 444; Road 5233	
Central	Horshim	15.2	9.4	מחלף חורשים (Horshim Interchange)	Highway 6 Road 5233	
1.000 mi = 1.609 km; 1.000 km = 0.621 mi
