= Kfar Malal =

Moshav in central Israel

Kfar Malal: כְּפַר מַלָּ״ל (Hebrew)
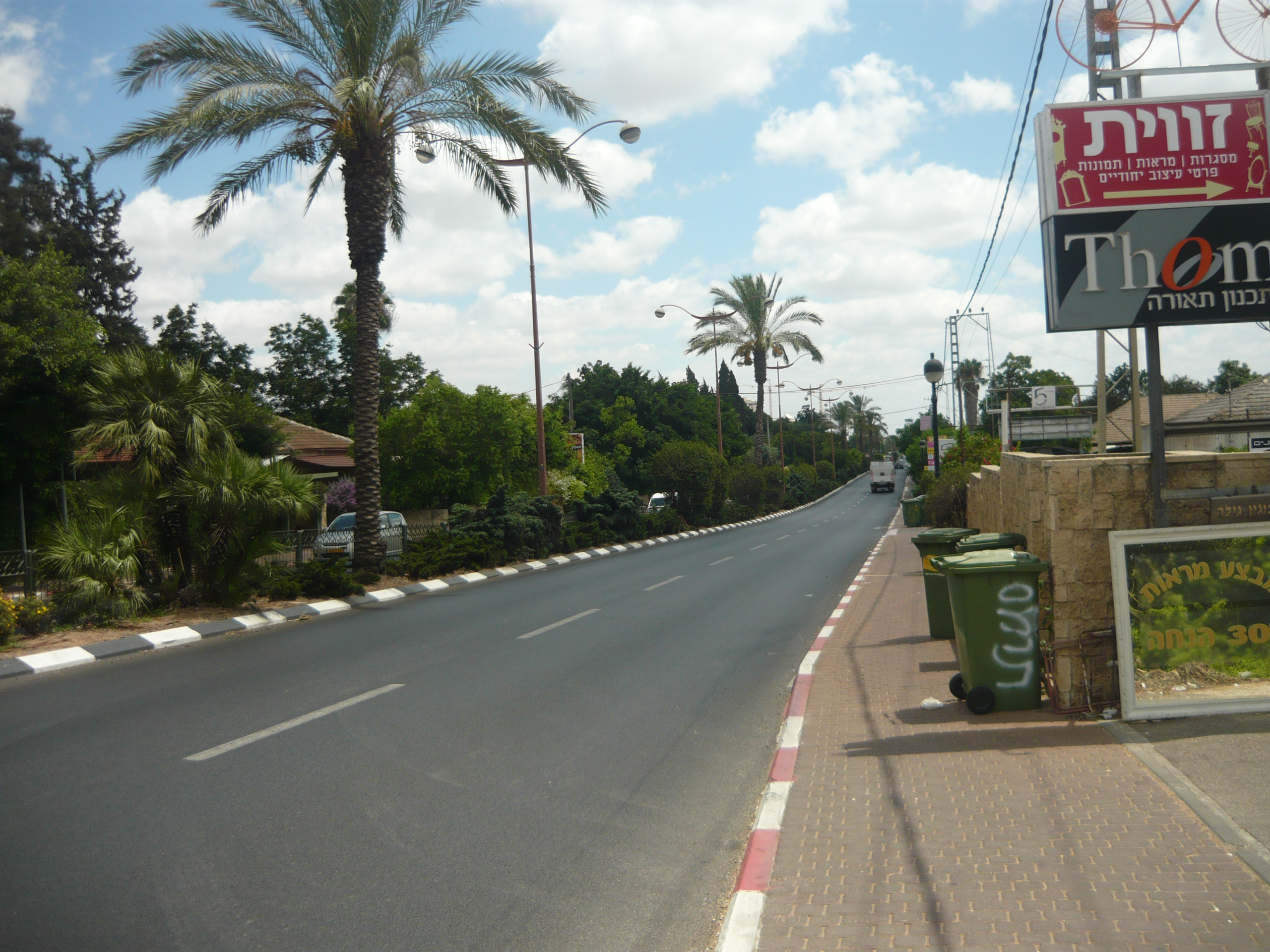
- Etymology: Moshe Leib Lilienblum village
- Location within Central Israel Location within Israel
- Coordinates: 32°10′4″N 34°53′42″E
- Country: Israel
- District: Central
- Subdistrict: Petah Tikva
- Council: Drom HaSharon
- Affiliation: Moshavim Movement
- Founded: 1911
- Population (2024): 308

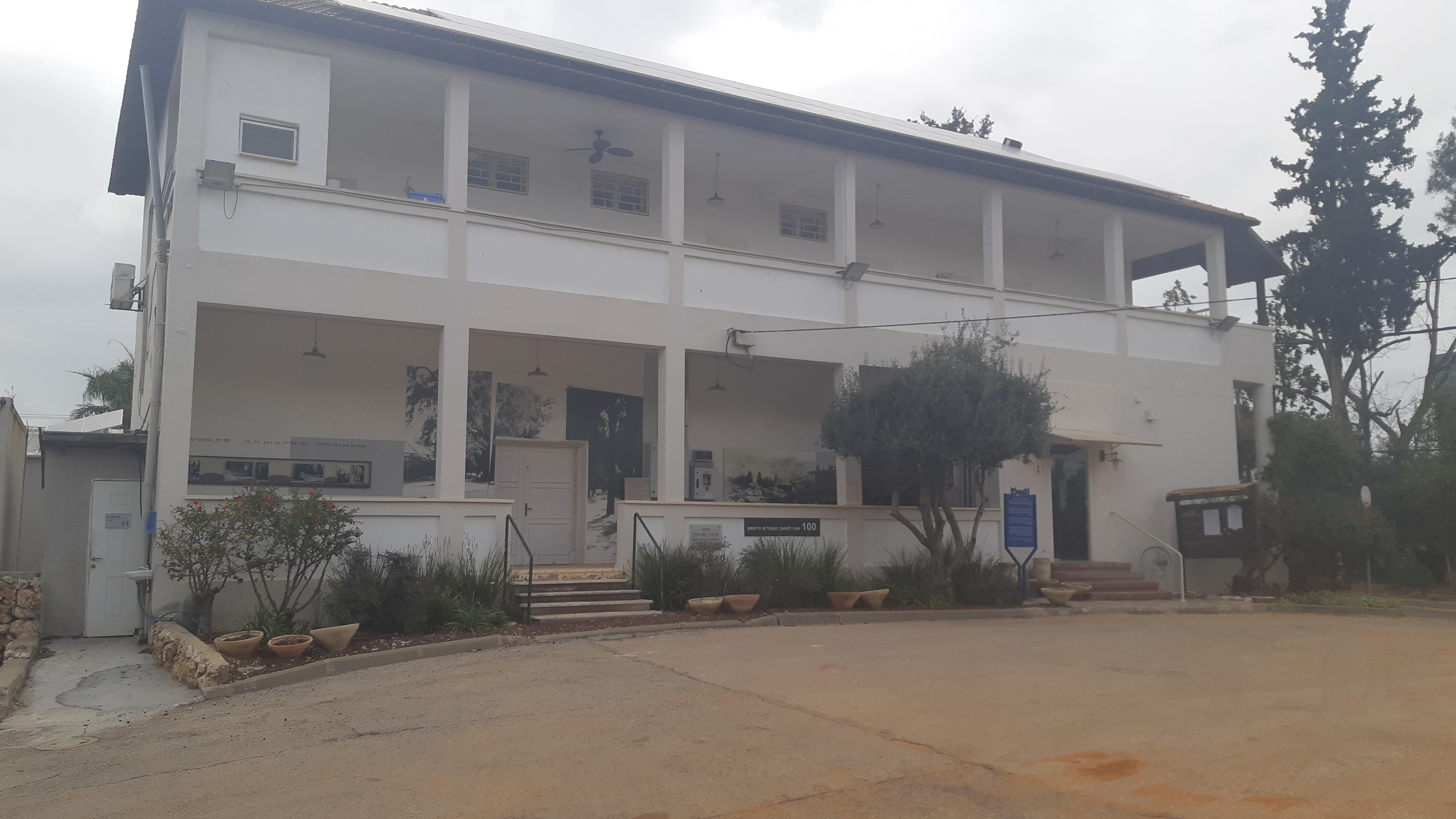
The Ein Hay Museum building in Kfar Malal, which is responsible for the project of preserving the remnants of the historic Moshava.

Kfar Malal (Hebrew: כְּפַר מַלָּ״ל) is a moshav in central Israel. Located in the Sharon plain, it falls under the jurisdiction of Drom HaSharon Regional Council. In 2024 it had a population of 308. The history of the Moshava is intertwined with the history of settlement in the land of Israel in the years 1910–1960. The settlement was among the first worker's colonies ever established, and according to Dr. Yoel Pixler's estimate, it was the first actual worker's Moshava in the world already in 1919, even though it was not officially recognized as such, and the title is given to Nahalal.

== History ==
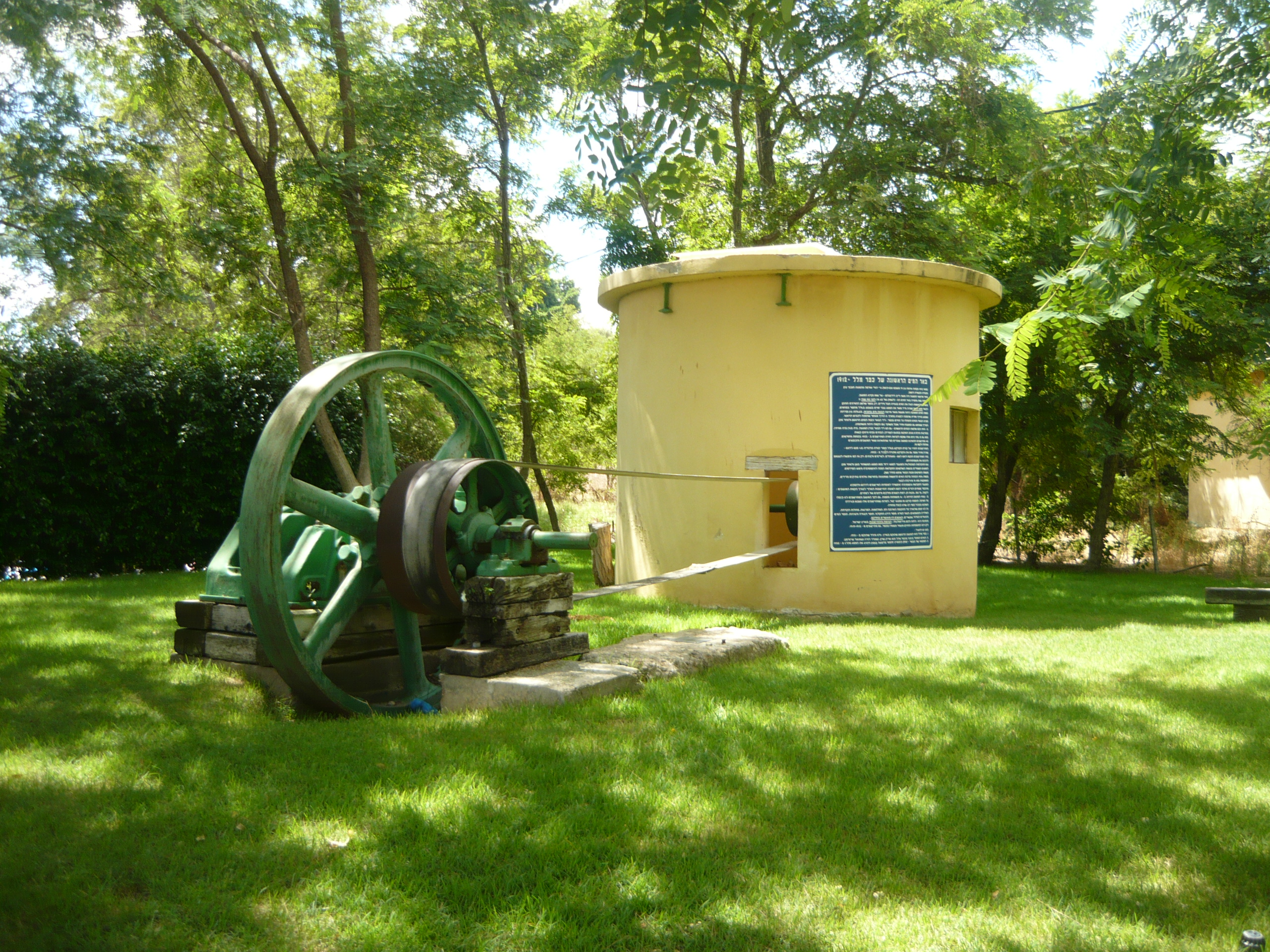
Historic well of Kfar Malal

Before the 20th century, the area formed part of the Forest of Sharon. It was an open woodland dominated by Mount Tabor Oak, which extended from Kfar Yona in the north to Ra'anana in the south. The local Arab inhabitants traditionally used the area for pasture, firewood and intermittent cultivation. The intensification of settlement and agriculture in the coastal plain during the 19th century led to deforestation and subsequent environmental degradation.

The village was established in 1911 as "Ein Hai" (lit. Fountain of the Living) on privately owned land. The original name was based on the name of ruins previously located there, Khurbet el-Haiyeh.

The first incarnation of the historic Zionist Moshava began in the summer of 1912 by 12 farmers of the Second Aliyah, who built five large workers' huts on land allocated to the Moshava by the Odessa Committee of Lovers of Zion.

The Moshava was founded on the ruins of an ancient settlement. About 1,300 years before the Moshava was founded, it was a Byzantine-Greek settlement which left remains of an industrial olive oil press. Afterward, an Arab settlement called "Al Hayya", or Ruins of the Snakes, was built on its ruins. At that time, it was common to name Zionist settlements with an ancient historic name similar to an ancient settlement that was nearby, and so in 1913 the members of the Moshava decided its name would be Ein Hay, and the settlement was founded as a workers' Moshav.

In 1914 the village was renamed into Kfar Malal after Moshe Leib Lilienblum, an early leader of the Hovevei Zion movement, whose acronym in Hebrew is MLL (מל"ל). In 1914 the Moshava included about 4,800 dunams of land. At the beginning of the year, several plans were put together to expand the Moshava and make other changes, such as turning the Moshava into a workers' Moshav, however these plans were not carried out due to the outbreak of World War I. A change that did take place was the name change of the Moshava to Kfar Malal, in memory of Moshe Leib Lilienblum.

The village was destroyed in the battles of World War I; in 1916, the Moshava was abandoned due to the difficulties in maintaining it during the war, and in 1918, the Ottomans destroyed the huts that were there. It was resettled by a group of laborers and ravaged again in the 1921 Jaffa riots.

In 1919 it was decided to rehabilitate the colony and resettle it, with the goal of establishing a workers' Moshav according to the vision of Eliezer Yaffe. For this purpose a new group of 18 settlers was organized, including two who were also part of the original founding nucleus in 1912, and returned to resettle Kfar Malal. They built the new buildings around the village well, which at this stage was very deep at 62 meters, forcing the settlers to descend to its depth and filter the water before they could raise the bucket up with a rope. With the renewal of the settlement, its members grew food for themselves, and also worked to cultivate various crops that would be suitable for agricultural activity in all seasons, including Oat, Vicia, watermelon fields, beehives and Vineyards. During this period the members also built the first stone houses of the settlement, and the dairy. Meanwhile, the Jewish National Fund expanded its lands in the area under its possession, by the end of 1920 there were about 1,250 dunams under the ownership of the Jewish National Fund in the areas of Kfar Malal.

On May 3, 1921, the settlement residents learned of a planned raid by Arab rioters on Kfar Malal and Kfar Saba, as part of the 1921 Jaffa riots. The settlement residents fled to Petah Tikva, and that night the raiders looted and burned down both settlements.

In 1922, the land was transferred to the Jewish National Fund and Kfar Malal was rebuilt as a moshav. It suffered more attacks in the 1929 Palestine riots. Ariel Sharon, Israel's eleventh prime minister, was born in Kfar Malal. His parents moved there in 1922. The first year and a half they lived in a tent while his father built a two-room house. Initially their mule and cow were kept in one of the rooms. There was no electricity or running water. In his autobiography he recalls watching rats crawling around the roof space. He also recalled that his mother slept with a rifle under her bed until her dying day due to the trauma of hiding in the cowshed with her children at night to escape roving Bedouin gangs.

In the early 21st century, they were preserved as part of the Ein Hay Museum project in Kfar Malal.

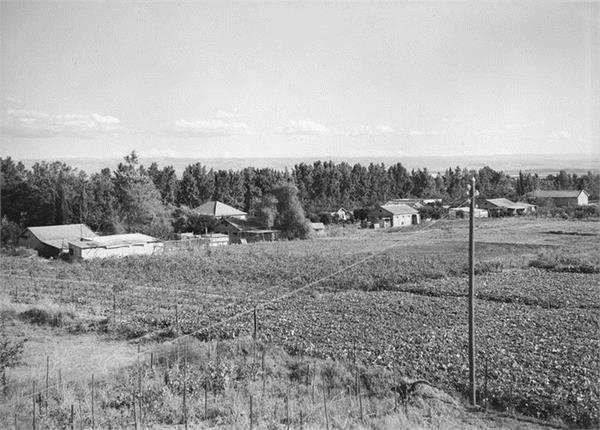
Kfar Malal 1943

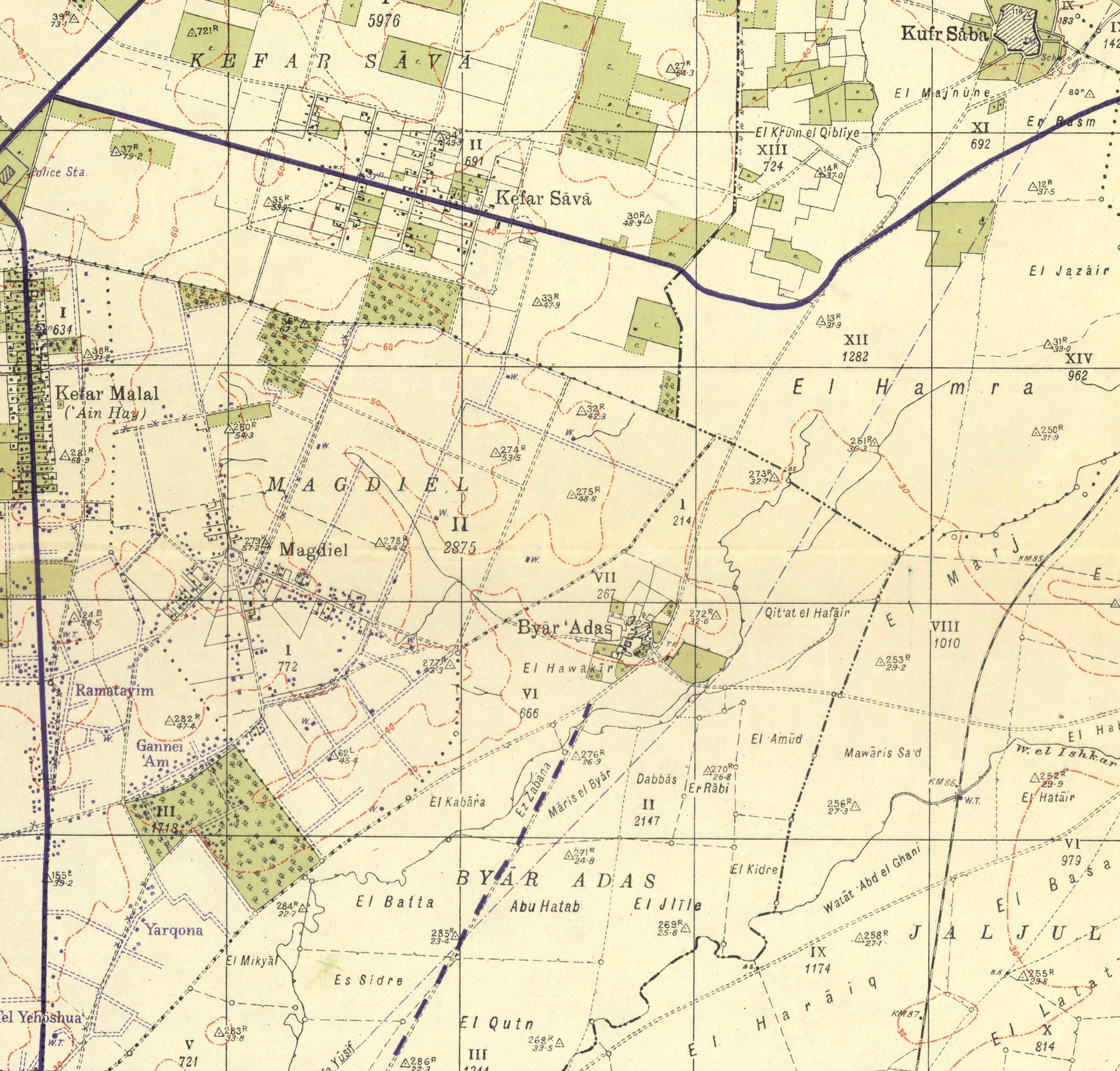
Kfar Malal 1942 1:20,000

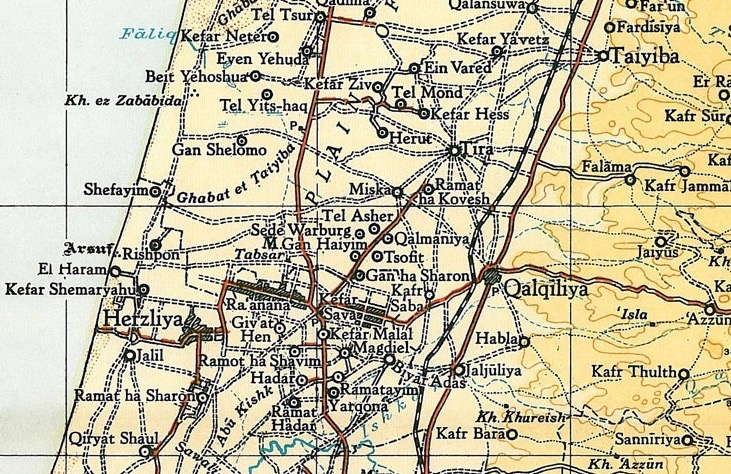
Kfar Malal 1945 1:250,000

== Economy ==
In 2006, Malal Park Industries Ltd, co-owned by members of Kfar Malal, signed an agreement with the German bank Eurohypo AG to refinance Park Azorim in Kiryat Aryeh, Petah Tikva.

In 2009, NI Medical, a biotech company located in Kfar Malal, received approval by the U.S. Food and Drug Administration (FDA) for a device that assesses left ventricular systolic dysfunction (LVSD). The device aids physicians in detecting heart failure in its pre-clinical, asymptomatic phase.

== Notable people ==
- Ariel Sharon (1928–2014), Israeli general and politician who served as the 11th Prime Minister of Israel.
