= Herzliya railway station =

Railway station in Israel

Herzliya הרצליה
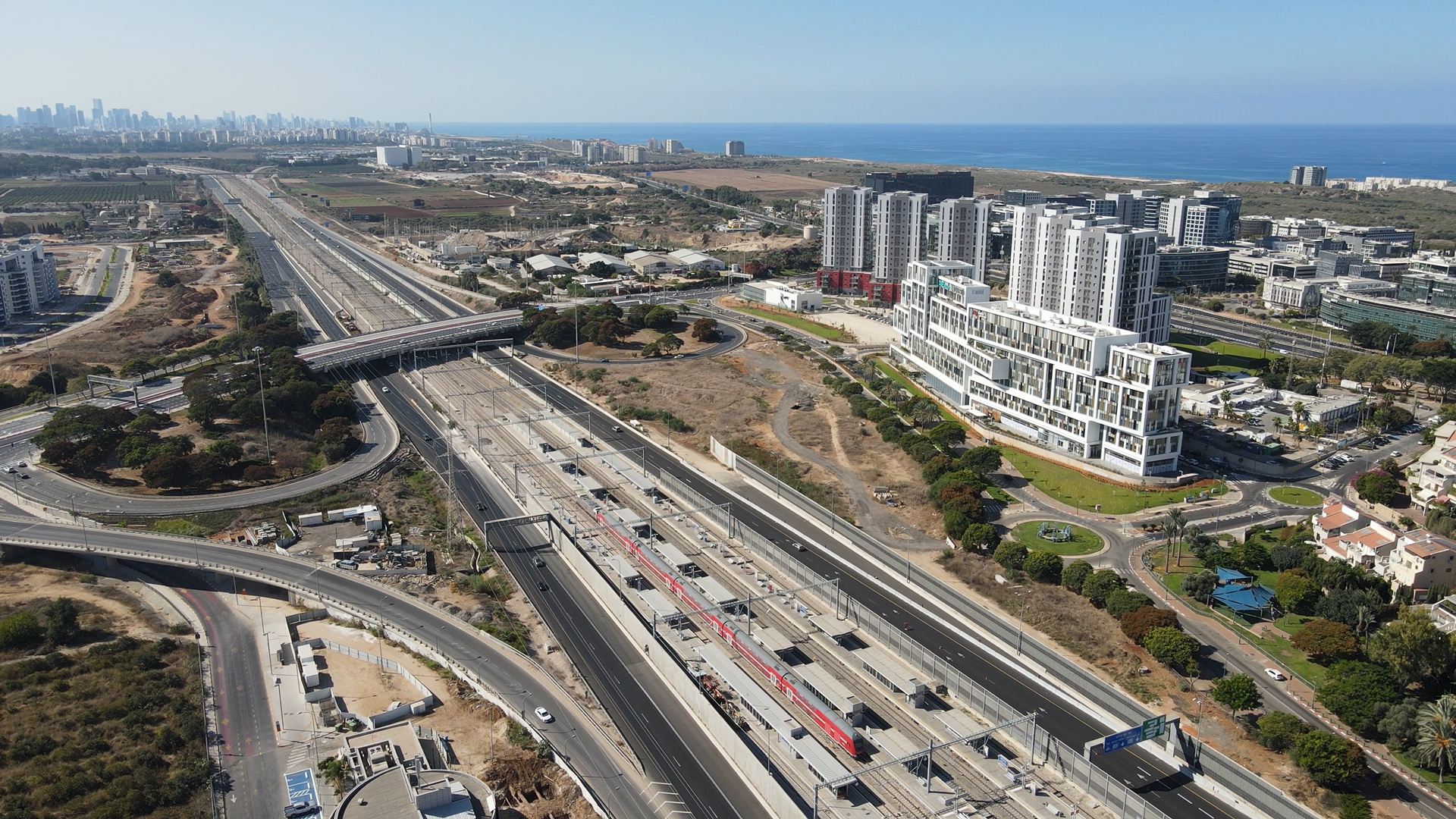

General information
- Location: Ben Zion Michaeli St. next to Shiv'at HaKohavim Mall Herzliya, Israel
- Coordinates: 32°09′50″N 34°49′53″E
- Line: Binyamina/Netanya–Tel Aviv–Rehovot/Ashkelon
- Platforms: 3
- Tracks: 6

Construction
- Parking: 300
- Accessible: yes

History
- Opened: 1953
- Rebuilt: 3 April 2004
- Electrified: 6 September 2020

Passengers
- 2019: 3,004,648
- Rank: 14 out of 68
Location

Herzliya railway station (Hebrew: תחנת הרכבת הרצליה, Taḥanat HaRakevet Herzliya) is an Israel Railways passenger station located in the city of Herzliya. The station currently has three island platforms serving two tracks each. In the 2010s, the Ayalon Highway was extended past the station northwards (as part of the Route 531 project) so that the platforms lie contained in the median of the highway, like the train stations in Tel Aviv. Beginning in 2024, it is the busiest railway station in the country outside of Tel Aviv and Jerusalem.

== History ==
The station was built in the 2000s to replace the older station which was opened on 23 October 1989 that was located a few hundred meters to the south of the present location. The old station was itself a reconstruction of the original station, built in 1953 together with the Coastal Railway. Most of the trains which stop at the station are suburban trains on the Binyamina/Netanya–Tel Aviv–Rehovot/Ashkelon line.

Since 2020, it is also a part of the new circular route (Sharon Railway) that serves the city of Ra'anana to the northeast, as well as Bnei Brak–Ramat HaHayal, Petah Tikva, Rosh Ha-Ayin, Kfar Saba and Hod Hasharon stations. The Sharon Railway was built as part of the Route 531 construction project.

The station also serves as the northern terminus for trains operating on the line between Herzliya and Jerusalem Yitzhak Navon station.

As part of the Route 531 project the station was greatly expanded. Platform exits were added leading directly to the pedestrian bridge across the tracks located in the northern end of the station, the existing side platform was converted to an island platform, and a new island platform was built east of the existing platforms. After these works, which effectively doubled the size of the station, it contains a total of three island platforms serving a total of six tracks, tying with Tel Aviv Central and Lod for the largest number of platforms in Israel. The additional platforms are necessary in order to accommodate the additional trains the station will serve on the Sharon Railway loop and as the terminus of trains which use the Tel Aviv–Jerusalem railway.

Currently, entry to the station is possible from east of the tracks and a new entry, including a new 290-space parking lot is under construction west of the station, supplementing the existing eastern lot.

== Train service ==
Preceding station	Israel Railways	Following station
Haifa–Hof HaCarmel towards Nahariya	Nahariya–Beersheba	Tel Aviv–University towards Be'er Sheva–Center
Hadera–West towards Karmiel	Karmiel–Beersheba	Tel Aviv–University towards Be'er Sheva–Center
Beit Yehoshua towards Binyamina	Binyamina–Beersheba	Tel Aviv–University towards Be'er Sheva–Center
Beit Yehoshua towards Netanya	Netanya–Rehovot	Tel Aviv–University towards Rehovot
Beit Yehoshua towards Netanya	Netanya–Beit Shemesh	Tel Aviv–University towards Beit Shemesh
Terminus	Herzliya–Ashkelon	Ra'anana–West towards Ashkelon
Terminus	Herzliya–Jerusalem	Tel Aviv–University towards Jerusalem–Yitzhak Navon
Netanya towards Nahariya	Night Train	Tel Aviv–Savidor Center towards Ben Gurion Airport or Jerusalem–Yitzhak Navon
Terminus	Night Train	Tel Aviv–Savidor Center towards Ben Gurion Airport or Jerusalem–Yitzhak Navon

== Station layout ==
Platform numbers increase in an East-to-West direction

Platform 1	← Herzliya–Ashkelon trains toward Ashkelon (Ra'anana–West)
Island platform
Platform 2	← Herzliya–Ashkelon trains toward Ashkelon (Ra'anana–West)
Platform 3	← Termination track – not in ordinary use →
Island platform
Platform 4	Nahariya–Modi'in trains toward Modi'in–Center do not stop here → Nahariya–Beersheba trains toward Be'er Sheva–Center (Tel Aviv–University) during peak hours only → Nahariya–Beersheba trains toward Be'er Sheva–Center do not stop here during off-peak hours → Karmiel–Beersheba and Binyamina–Beersheba trains toward Be'er Sheva–Center (Tel Aviv–University) → Netanya–Rehovot trains toward Rehovot (Tel Aviv–University) peak hours only → Netanya–Beit Shemesh trains toward Beit Shemesh (Tel Aviv–University) peak hours only → Night Train toward Jerusalem–Yitzhak Navon or Ben Gurion Airport (Tel Aviv–Savidor Center) →
Platform 5	Herzliya–Jerusalem trains toward Jerusalem–Yitzhak Navon (Tel Aviv–University) →
Island platform
Platform 6	← Nahariya–Modi'in trains toward Nahariya do not stop here ← Nahariya–Beersheba trains toward Nahariya (Haifa–Hof HaCarmel) peak hours only ← Nahariya–Beersheba trains toward Nahariya do not stop here off-peak hours ← Karmiel–Beersheba trains toward Karmiel (Hadera–West) ← Binyamina–Beersheba trains toward Binyamina (Beit Yehoshua) ← Netanya–Rehovot and Netanya–Beit Shemesh trains toward Netanya (Beit Yehoshua) during peak hours only ← Night Train toward Nahariya (Netanya)

== Ridership ==
Passengers boarding and disembarking by year
Year	Passengers	Rank	Source
2021	1,795,033 (▲786,956)	10 of 66 (▲5)	2021 Freedom of Information Law Annual Report
2020	1,008,077 (▼1,996,571)	15 of 68 (▼1)	2020 Freedom of Information Law Annual Report
2019	3,004,648	14 of 68	2019 Freedom of Information Law Annual Report

== See also ==
- Transportation in Israel
