= Ashkelon railway station =

Railway station in Israel

Ashkelon אשקלון
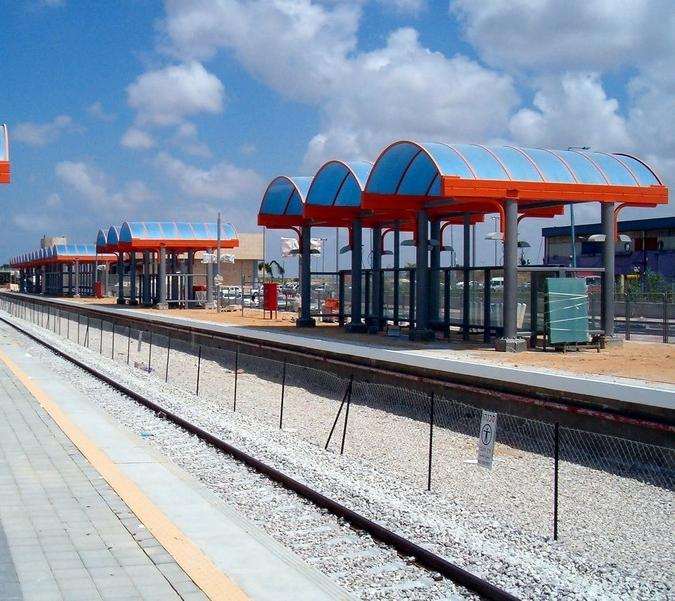

General information
- Location: Adjacent to "Cosmos" shopping center, Kefar Silver Junction, Ashkelon
- Coordinates: 31°40′35″N 34°36′16″E
- Platforms: 2
- Tracks: 4

Construction
- Parking: 150 spaces
- Cycle facilities: 5 spaces
- Accessible: yes

History
- Opened: March 1917; 109 years ago
- Closed: 1948–1972, 1973–2005
- Rebuilt: April 2005
- Electrified: 25 December 2021; 4 years ago
- Former names: 1917–1948: Majdal

Passengers
- 2019: 3,005,131
- Rank: 13 out of 68
Location

The Ashkelon railway station is a railway station that is located in Ashkelon, Israel. It is the southern terminus of the Binyamina–Tel Aviv–Ashkelon and the Ra'anana–Rishon LeZion–Ashkelon suburban lines. Previously, Majdal railway station, built by the British forces during World War I, has existed at the site, and since 1920, the station served regular passenger trains between El Kantara, Egypt and Haifa. During 1948 Arab–Israeli War, the connection to Gaza Strip and Egypt was severed, but freight service on the Lod–Ashkelon railway continued.

In 2002 it was decided to double-track the Ashdod–Ashkelon railway and recommence the passenger service to Ashkelon. Some of the remains of the old British station were demolished as part of preparing the site. The new Ashkelon passenger station was opened in 2005. Later, a new railway north of Ashkelon was constructed between Rishon LeZion and Ashdod Ad Halom railway station. This new line was inaugurated on 4 August 2013 and significantly shortened the travel time from Ashdod and Ashkelon to Tel Aviv to 35 and 45 minutes respectively.

The railway line south of the station was extended to Beersheba beginning in 2006, which enabled rail service to the towns of Sderot, Ofakim and Netivot in the northern Negev. The line was completed in 2015.

In late 2021 an NIS 15 million renovation project at the station was completed. The works included preservation of some of the station's original early 20th-century structures. At the same time, the station also underwent electrification.

The station complex also houses a large electric multiple unit train maintenance depot that was completed in 2021.

== Facilities ==
Station layout diagram

Facilities present at the station are:

- Payphone
- One ticket cashier
- Two ticket machines
- Parking lot
- Toilets

Preceding station	Israel Railways	Following station
Ashdod–Ad Halom towards Binyamina	Binyamina–Beersheba	Sderot towards Be'er Sheva–Center
Terminus	Ashkelon–Beersheba	Sderot towards Be'er Sheva–Center
Ashdod–Ad Halom towards Herzliya	Herzliya–Ashkelon	Terminus
