= Rishon LeZion–Modi'in railway =

Railway project under construction in Israel

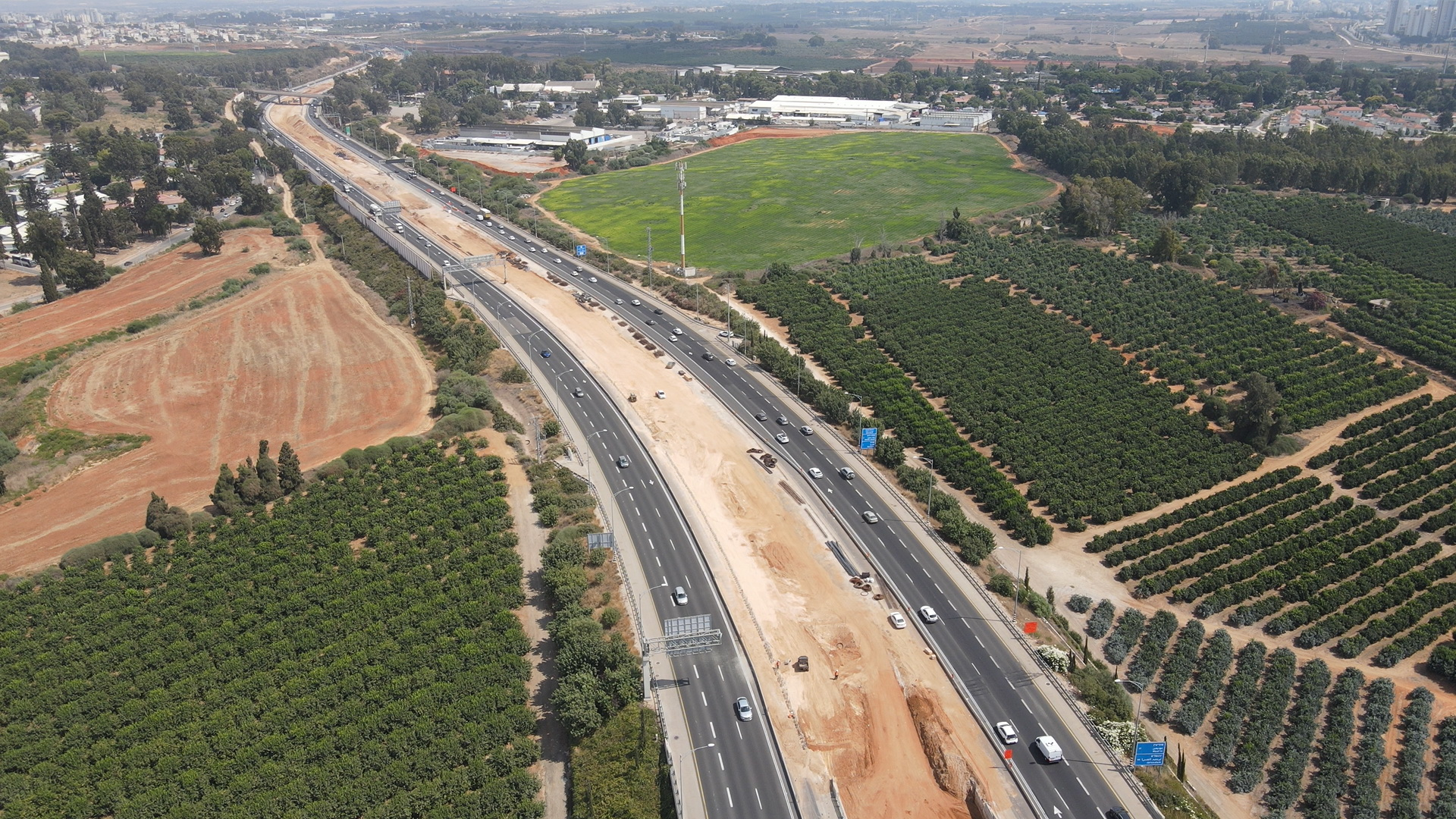
- Railway construction north of Netzer Sereni (2020)

Overview
- Status: Under construction
- Owner: Israel Railways
- Locale: Rishon LeZion, Ramla, Modi'in
- Termini: Rishon LeZion Moshe Dayan; Modi'in Center
- Stations: 6 (2 under construction)

History
- Planned opening: 2028

Technical
- Line length: 30 km (19 mi)
- Track gauge: 1,435 mm (4 ft 8 1/2 in) standard gauge
- Electrification: 25 kV 50 Hz AC

The Rishon LeZion–Modi'in railway (also known as 431 railway and Sorek railway (Note: Named after the Sorek stream, which flows from east to west and empties into the Mediterranean south of the railway. However, the same name is also occasionally applied to the old Jerusalem–Beit Shemesh railway, which runs along the stream in its upriver eastern section.)) is a railway project under construction linking the cities of Rishon LeZion and Modi'in in central Israel. The project will form a part of Israel Railways' suburban rail network serving the Tel Aviv metropolitan area, as well as provide an east-west connection between the Tel Aviv–Ashkelon, Tel Aviv–Beersheba and Tel Aviv–Jerusalem rail corridors. The fully electrified line will be 30 km (19 mi) long, and involve the construction of two new train stations and Israel's longest railway viaduct.

Works on the railway started in November 2019. The project is estimated to open in 2028.

== History ==
=== Background ===
The line incorporates two small sections of existing infrastructure which were previously disjointed spur lines. The 3 km (1.9 mi) single-track Be'er Ya'akov–Rishon LeZion railway, which branched off the British-period Lod–Ashkelon railway and terminated at Rishon LeZion HaRishonim, opened in 2003. The 7.5 km (4.7 mi) double-track Anava–Modi'in railway, a branch of the Tel Aviv–Jerusalem railway (which was only completed up to Ben Gurion Airport at the time), opened in segments between 2007 and 2008, terminating at Modi'in Center.

In 2005, works began on the construction of Route 431, a limited-access freeway connecting Rishon LeZion with Modi'in. Traffic lanes were built on either side of both the Be'er Ya'akov–Rishon LeZion and Anava–Modi'in railways, incorporating the existing rail tracks into the new highway median, in a manner similar to Ayalon freeway-railway in central Tel Aviv. The highway was additionally designed to accommodate a dual-track railroad in its median for much of its length, guaranteeing right-of-way to extend and connect these two sections and thus creating the potential for a new contiguous Rishon LeZion–Modi'in corridor.

Additionally, the Rishon LeZion Moshe Dayan–Yavne West section of the Tel Aviv–Bnei Darom railway, which opened in 2012, was also designed with provisions for a tunnel branching eastwards, to connect to the western end of the future Rishon LeZion–Modi'in line.

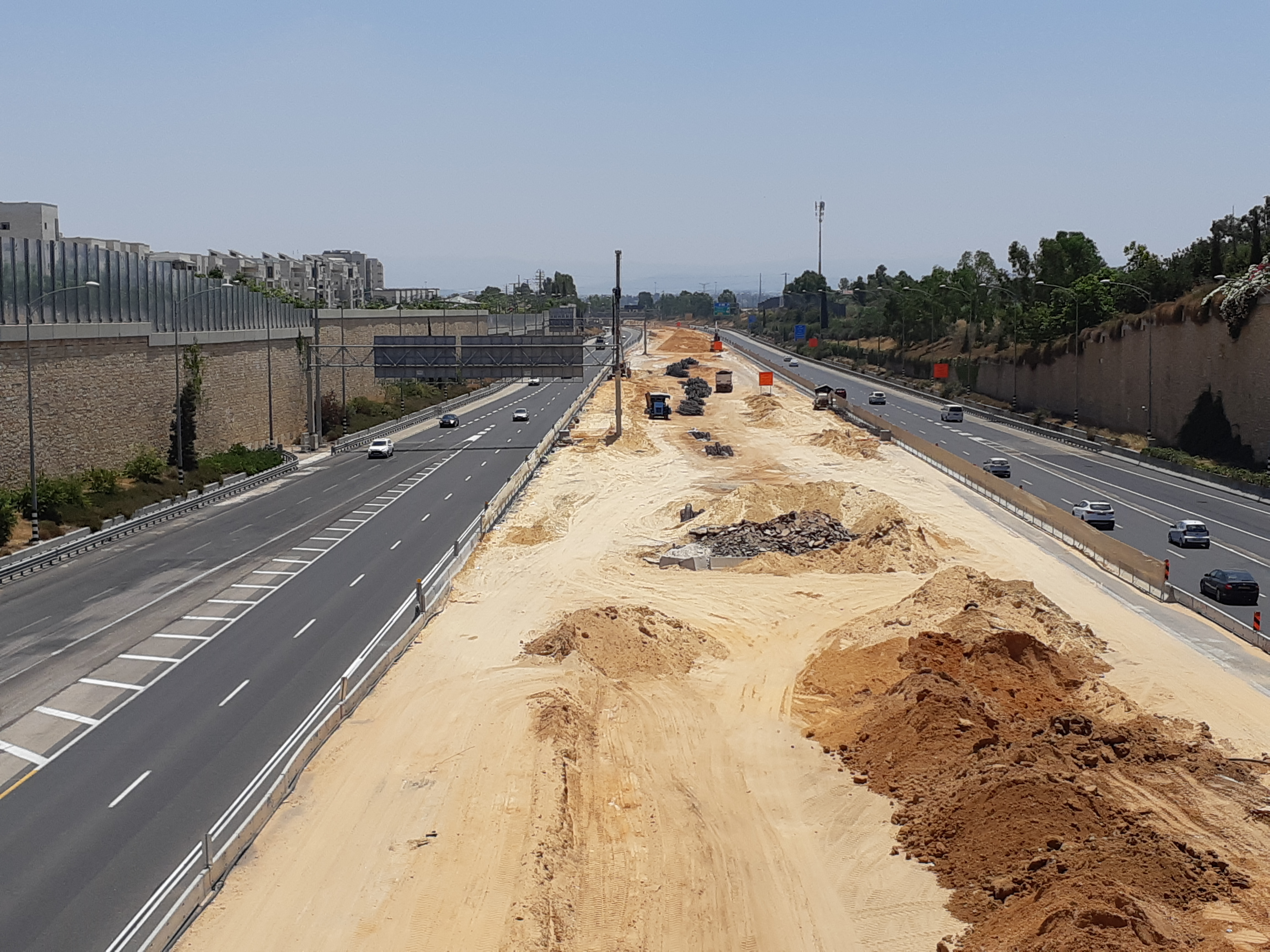
Highway 431 (opened 2009) was designed to accommodate a dual-track railway in its median.

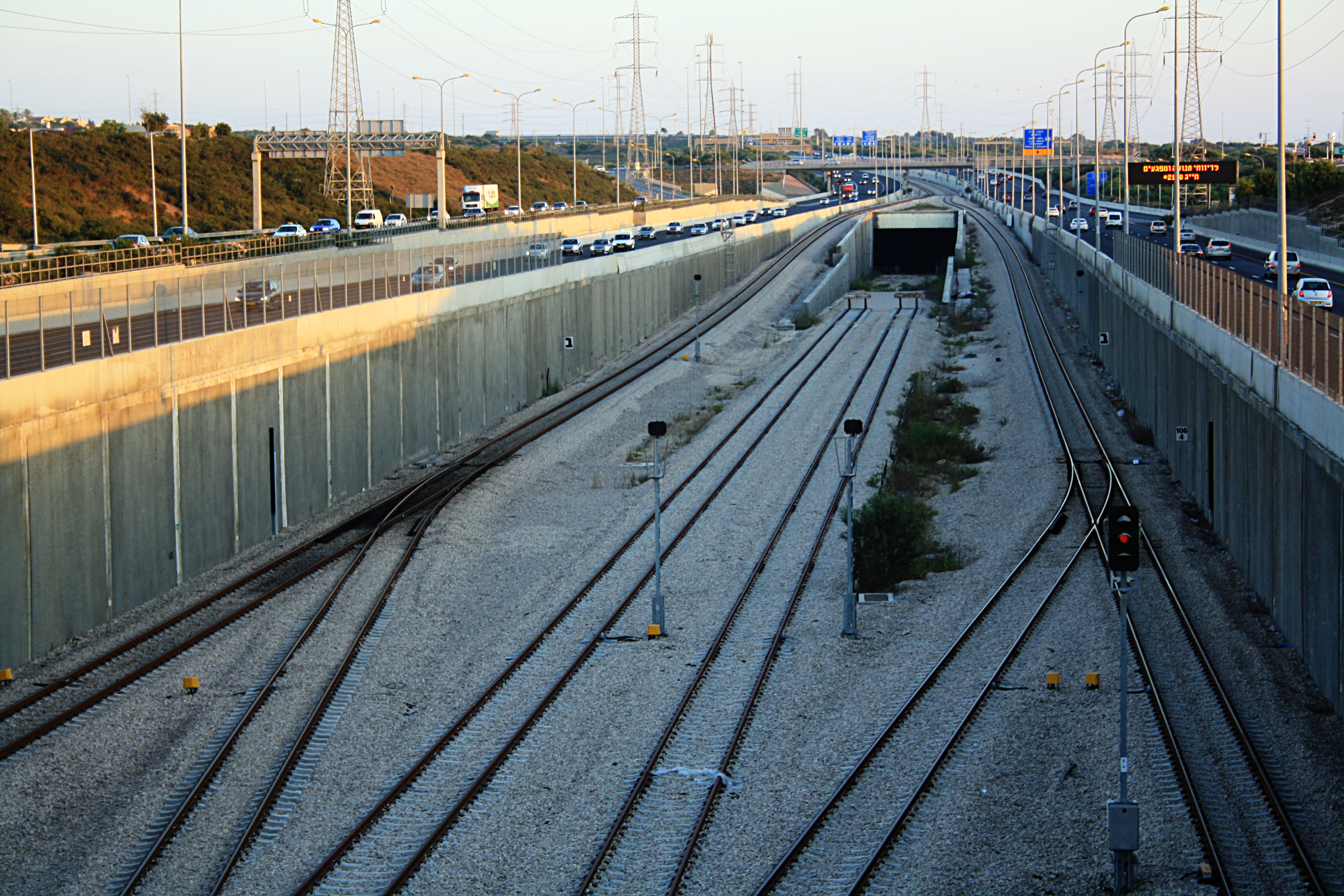
Tunnel opening built in the Tel Aviv–Bnei Darom railway (2012) south of Rishon LeZion Moshe Dayan, in preparation for a future branch line towards Modi'in.

=== Planning ===
In 2010, plans for the construction of the Rishon LeZion–Modi'in railway were submitted to the Center District planning committee. Objections were submitted by 2012.

In 2014, it was decided to re-route the western section of the railway, between Moshe Dayan and HaRishonim, which had been planned to run through the built-up area of Rishon LeZion along Rabin Avenue. Rishon LeZion municipality and residents were opposed to the construction of a train station close to residential neighbourhoods, prompting the rail line to be diverted outside the city. Instead, the revised plan called for the line to run on a viaduct on the south side of Route 431, and the station which had been planned to service western Rishon LeZion and COMAS college was relocated to Me'uyan Sorek Business Park.

As such, the majority of the route east of HaRishonim was approved in 2014, while the western HaRishonim–Moshe Dayan section was processed separately and approved in 2017.

=== Construction ===
In December 2018, first tenders for the construction of the line were issued. The first construction contract was awarded in September 2019 to Electra Infrastructures. Construction works started in November 2019.

Contracts for other sections of the line were subsequently awarded to Solel Boneh, Shikun & Binui, and Danya Cebus all throughout 2020.

Apart from laying approximately 30 km (19 mi) of new double tracks, the project also involves doubling the single-track section east of Rishon LeZion HaRishonim.

Twelve bridges at a total length of 6 km (3.7 mi) are being constructed for this line, including a single 3.5 km (2.2 mi) viaduct, which will be Israel's longest railway bridge upon completion. The project also includes 1 km (3,300 ft) of tunneling, with the longest tunnel at 450 m (1,480 ft) in length.

Two new railway stations are being built as part of the project, Rishon LeZion Tashach and Ramla South. In addition, works are being carried out in Rishon LeZion HaRishonim to extend the station platforms.

There will be a track connection to the Tel Aviv-Jerusalem railway after the Anava Interchange on Route 431.

Works will be carried out to electrify the full length of the line at 25 kV 50 Hz AC, to comply with the Tel Aviv–Ashkelon and Tel Aviv–Jerusalem railways.

== Stations ==
The 6 stations of the line include four pre-existing stations which were built in previous years as part of separate railway lines.

Two brand new stations (marked †) will be built as part of the project, and at least one station (Rishon LeZion HaRishonim) will be significantly upgraded and expanded.

Station		Opened	Transfers	Location
English	Hebrew	Opened	Transfers	Location
Rishon LeZion Moshe Dayan	ראשון לציון משה דיין	2011	Light Rail Red Line (planned); Light Rail Green Line (planned)	Rishon LeZion
Rishon LeZion Tashach †	ראשון לציון תש"ח	2028 (est.)		Rishon LeZion
Rishon LeZion HaRishonim	ראשון לציון הראשונים	2003	HaRishonim Bus Terminal; Metro M1 Line (planned)	Rishon LeZion
Ramla South †	רמלה דרום	2028 (est.)	Ramla South Bus Terminal (planned)	Ramla
Pa'atei Modi'in	פאתי מודיעין	2007		Modi'in
Modi'in Center	מודיעין מרכז	2008	Modi'in Central Bus Station	Modi'in

== Operations ==
Israel Railways plans to run commuter services on the railway as part of a larger loop encompassing the Tel Aviv metropolitan area, and including the Sharon railway and Eastern railway. Frequency is planned to be 2 trains an hour for each direction, and double that following further expansions of the network.

Israel Railways estimates that the railway will shorten travel times from Rishon LeZion to Modi'in from 60 to about 30 minutes, and carry 15,000 passengers per day.
