= Lod–Ashkelon railway =

Railway line in Israel

The Lod–Ashkelon railway is a railway line linking Lod and Ashkelon. It is operated by Israel Railways, and spans approximately 50 km of mostly double track in central and southern Israel.

== History ==
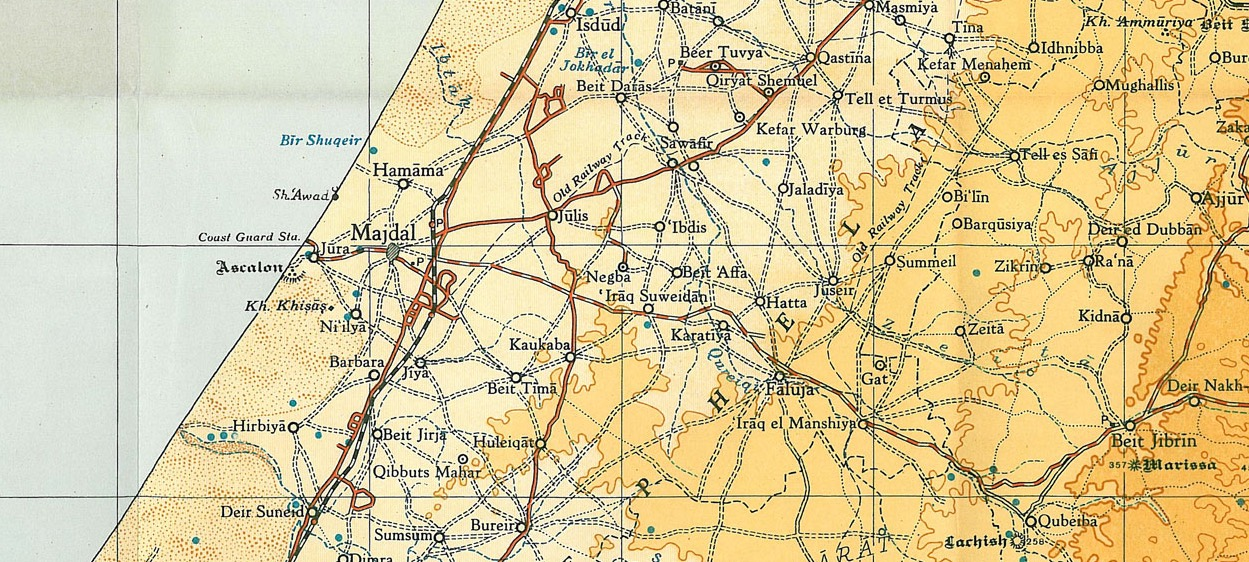
British map from 1944, showing the old and the new railway lines around Majdal (Ashkelon)

The railway traces its origins to the Ottoman rule in Palestine and the Sinai and Palestine military campaign of World War I. The main Turkish objective in the Middle East during World War I was to either capture or disable the Suez Canal, which would have put the British Empire at a great disadvantage. However, transporting troops and supplies from Constantinople to the front lines took months by camel caravan.

After his assault on the British garrison along the canal in January–February 1915, Jamal Pasha enlisted the help of the German engineer Heinrich August Meissner, who also planned the Hejaz Railway, to help him find a more efficient method of logistics. Meissner started constructing a railway to the south of the Palestine region, with the Wadi Surar station of the Jaffa–Jerusalem railway, some 15 km south of Lod railway station, serving as the starting point. At Al-Tina, the railway split into two branches: one to Beit Hanoun via Majdal, and the other to Beersheba. The two lines were collectively called the 'Egyptian Branch'. The Lydda–Wadi Surar section, previously of 1,000 mm (3 ft 3 3/8 in) metre gauge narrow gauge, was converted to the Hejaz railway width of 1,050 mm (3 ft 5 11/32 in) narrow gauge standard, allowing rail traffic from Hejaz railway via the Eastern railway to continue further south from Lydda (Lod).

When the British captured the territory in 1918, they dismantled both "Egyptian Branch" railways, save for a short section between Beit Hanoun and Majdal. This 13-km-long section was converted into 1,435 mm (4 ft 8 1/2 in) standard gauge and later incorporated into the new Palestine Railways main line, which opened to passenger service on 1 November 1920, and linked El Kantara, Egypt via Gaza City, Majdal (Ashkelon), Lydda and Hadera to Haifa. A whole new, much more direct, standard gauge railway section was built from Majdal via Isdud (Ashdod) and Yibna (Yavne) to Lydda; one of the purposes for the new route was to enable shipment of citrus fruits from orchards around Rehovot to the port of Haifa.

The Tehran Children—a group of 1230 Jewish refugees from Poland, mostly children, who escaped in 1939 to USSR, then in 1942 to Iran, then brought by the Jewish Agency for Israel by sea to Suez, and from there on a train to the Yishuv—travelled the whole length of the Lod–Ashkelon railway, stopping at Rehovot railway station on February 18, 1943, before continuing further north.

During the 1948 Arab–Israeli War, the railway was severed at the Gaza Strip border, and the southernmost station which remained accessible to Israel Railways was Dayr Sunayd near the kibbutz Yad Mordechai. The passenger service on the line stopped, but freight service continued on the whole stretch between Lod and Majdal. During the bus drivers' strike in 1956, the passenger service on the line was reinstated just for the few days of the strike; then again, for the short time between 1972 and the Yom Kippur War in 1973, passenger service was introduced between Gaza City (occupied by Israel following the Six-Day War in 1967) and Tel Aviv.

In November 1961, a short branch line to the port of Ashdod was opened just north of the city of Ashdod; then, on 17 November 1982, Heletz railway connected the branch line to the port of Ashdod with the railway to Beersheba, allowing the freight traffic between the south of Israel and the port to bypass the busy railways around Lod. One more branch line, to Rutenberg Power Station just south of Ashkelon, opened in 1990 to supply the power station with coal imported via the port of Ashdod. This branch line is out of use since 2000, when a pier was built at the power station to allow unloading the coal directly from the ships.

The regular passenger service was introduced between Lod and Rehovot in 1990, then extended to Ashdod in 1992, and later to Ashkelon in 2005. Between 1999 and 2001, the section between Lod and Rehovot was converted to double track.

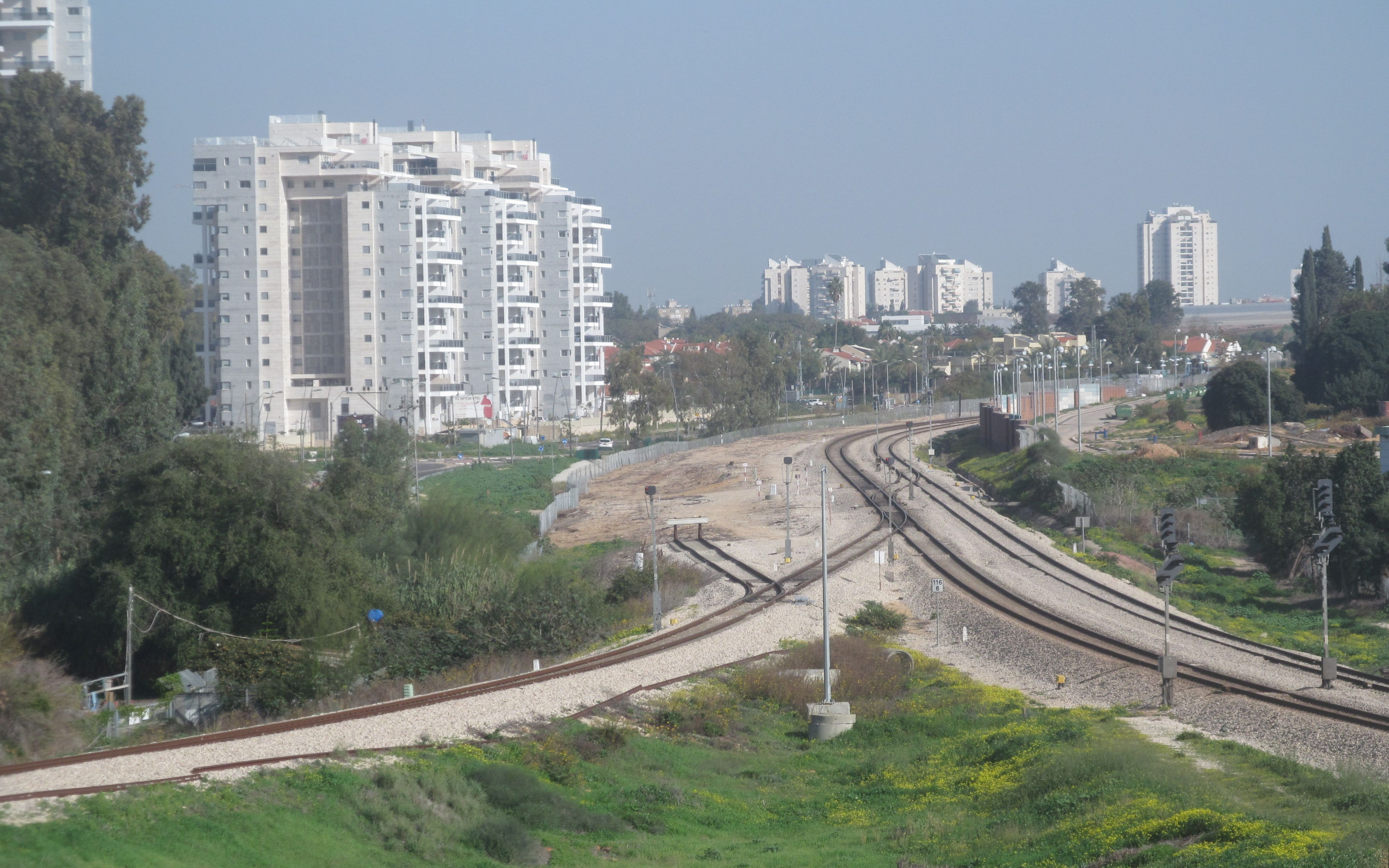
Line to HaRishonim branching off just south of Be'er Ya'akov

In 2002–2003, a short 3-km-long branch line was built from Be'er Ya'akov railway station to the newly built Rishon LeZion HaRishonim railway station. This section is part of the future Rishon LeZion–Modi'in railway, which, beginning in 2021, is being extended further westwards to Rishon LeZion Moshe Dayan railway station on the Ayalon railway, as well as eastwards, in the median of highway 431, towards Modi'in and the high-speed railway to Jerusalem.

In 2013, the Coastal railway was connected to the Lod–Ashkelon railway, enabling a direct passenger service from Tel Aviv and the north of Israel to Ashdod and Ashkelon, without going through Lod. From Yad Mordechai, the southern end of the Lod–Ashkelon railway, the line has been extended to Beersheba through the northern Negev. This extension was completed in 2015.

In 2021 the section between Ashdod and Ashkelon was electrified the using an overhead line 25 kV 50 Hz AC system; however, this electrification was not the Lod-Ashkelon railway as such, but rather a continuance of the electrification of the Tel Aviv–Bnei Darom Railway, which reaches Ashdod via Bat Yam, Holon, and Rishon LeZion. The section between Lod and Rehovot was electrified in 2022, while the remainder of the line, between Rehovot and Ashdod, underwent electrification in 2023.

== Future plans ==
As of 2022, the section between Rehovot and Pleshet (near Ashdod) is one of the few railways in central Israel still consisting of only single track. Works to double track the section between Rehovot and Yavne are expected to be completed in late 2022. The last remaining single track portion, an approximately 3km section between Yavne and Pleshet will be rebuilt at a later date as double track, partially-underground within a widened Route 410, and include a relocated and expanded Yavne East railway station.
