= Rishon LeZion railway station =

Rishon LeZion railway station may refer to:

- Rishon LeZion HaRishonim railway station
- Rishon LeZion Moshe Dayan railway station
