= Rishon LeZion Tashach railway station =

Israeli railway station

Rishon LeZion–Tashakh ראשון לציון – תש"ח
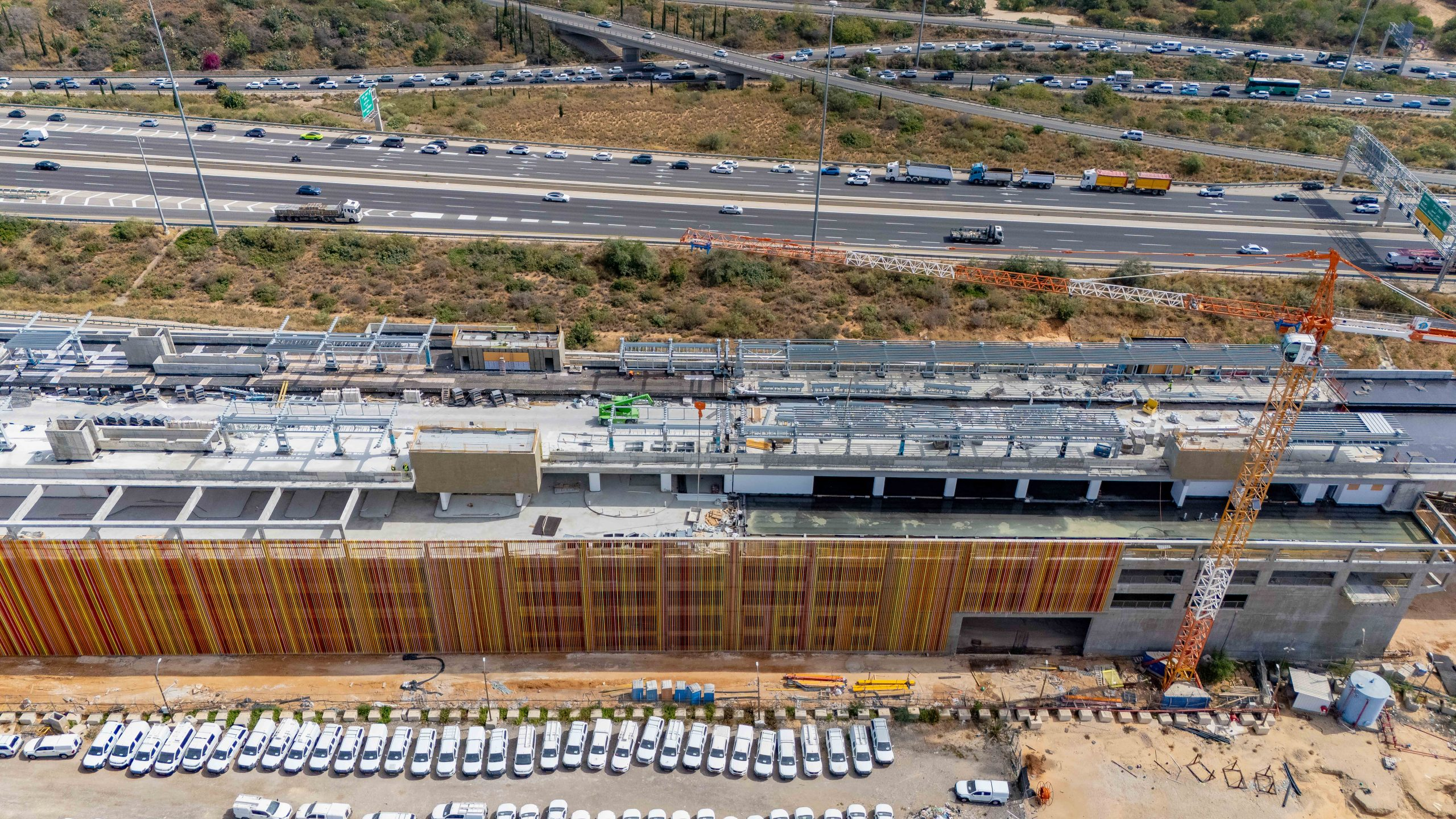
- Tashach railway station under construction in 2026

General information
- Location: Sorek Industrial Area; Israel
- Coordinates: 31°57′21″N 34°46′36″E
- Line: Rishon LeZion–Modi'in railway

Construction
- Structure type: Elevated

History
- Opening: 2028 (planned)
Location

Rishon LeZion–Tashakh (Hebrew: תחנת הרכבת ראשון לציון – תש״ח) is a railway station under construction near Rishon LeZion, Israel at the Ein HaKore Interchange between Route 431 and Highway 42. The station will serve the future Rishon LeZion–Modi'in railway, helping connect southern Gush Dan with Modi'in via Ramla.

The station will connect the main coastal railway with the existing HaRishonim station in Rishon LeZion before passing through the other new station being built for this railway, Ramla - South.
