= Be'er Ya'akov railway station =

Railway station in Israel

Be'er Ya'akov באר יעקב
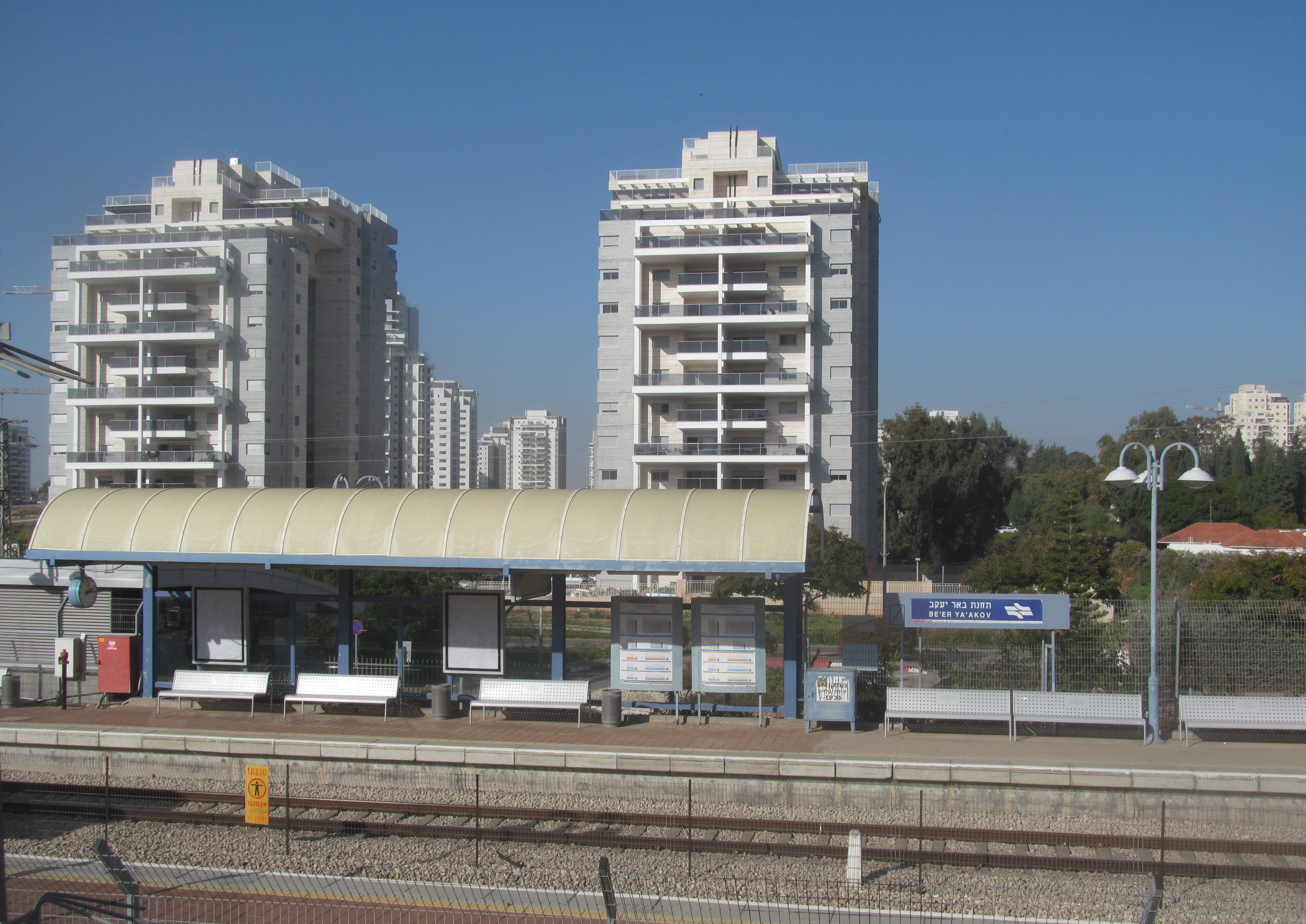

General information
- Location: Simcha Holzberg St., Be'er Ya'akov
- Coordinates: 31.932462°N 34.830571°E
- Line: Lod–Ashkelon railway
- Platforms: 2
- Tracks: 2

Construction
- Parking: 70 spaces
- Cycle facilities: yes

History
- Opened: February 1918; 108 years ago
- Closed: 1953–1972, 1973–1991
- Electrified: 17 September 2022; 3 years ago
- Former names: 1918–1948: Bir Salim

Passengers
- 2019: 777,819
- Rank: 46 out of 68
Location

Be'er Ya'akov railway station is a railway station in the Israeli town of Be'er Ya'akov. The station is located at the southern end of the town, roughly 2 miles east of Ness Ziona and 2.5 miles south east of Rishon LeZion.

== History ==
The station originally opened in February 1918 and was named after the nearby British military headquarters as Bir as-Salim railway station, and served regular passenger trains between El Kantara, Egypt and Haifa. When the 1948 Arab-Israeli War broke out, the passenger service at the station ceased for half a century.

== Access ==
The station is served by Kavim bus routes 1, 2, and 247. The station is also served by regular share taxis that operating on route number 247. It also has 70 free parking spaces, and 8 equipped for the disabled.

== Trains ==
The station serves suburban lines between Ashkelon, and Binyamina. Trains operate every day of the week, though not between sunset Friday and sunset Saturday (Jewish Sabbath).

Preceding station	Israel Railways	Following station
Lod towards Binyamina	Binyamina–Beersheba	Rehovot towards Be'er Sheva–Center
Lod towards Netanya	Netanya–Rehovot	Rehovot Terminus
