= Yavne–East railway station =

Railway station in Israel

Yavne–East יבנה – מזרח
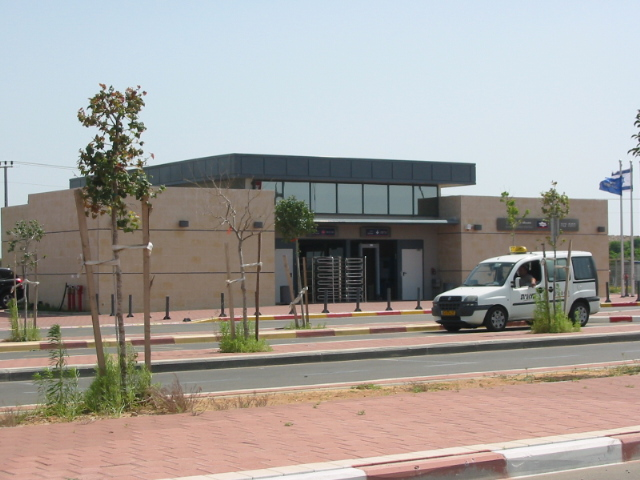

General information
- Location: HaMeisav St., Yavne
- Coordinates: 31°51′39.44″N 34°44′36.06″E
- Line: Lod–Ashkelon railway
- Platforms: 1
- Tracks: 1

Construction
- Parking: 300 spaces
- Cycle facilities: 8 spaces

History
- Opened: 1992
- Rebuilt: 2009
- Electrified: 28 January 2023; 3 years ago
- Former names: 1918–1948: Yibna; 1948–1973: Yavne

Passengers
- 2019: 470,468
- Rank: 52 out of 68
Location

Yavne–East railway station is one of two railway stations in Yavne, Israel. It is on the suburban line Binyamina/Netanya–Tel Aviv–Rehovot/Ashkelon. Yavne East was opened in 1992 and was fully rebuilt in 2009.

Despite the name, the station is located south of the city of Yavne, near the entrance via Highway 42, and adjacent to an industrial area. Five local and intercity bus lines serve the station and the parking lot has 300 spaces.

Yavne East station is located about 3 km south-west of the former Yibna railway station, which opened in 1920 as part of the Lod–Ashkelon railway, operated by Palestine Railways. The former station was located near the village of Al-Qubayba, presently within the moshav Ge'alya east of Yavne.

The other railway station in Yavne, Yavne West, is located in the western part of the city and is situated on the new rail line from Tel Aviv to Ashdod via Rishon LeZion, adjacent to the Yavne Central Bus Station and was opened in 2012.

Yavne East is one of only two train stations in Israel with only a single passenger platform (the other being the little-used Dimona railway station). As part of the double-tracking, upgrade and electrification works of the Rehovot–Pleshet section of the Lod–Ashkelon railway and a large housing and commercial development plan for the area, Yavne East station will be rebuilt in a different location on the railway sometime by the mid-2020s decade. The new station will have four passenger platforms located below ground level with the station building situated at ground level.

== Facilities ==
Facilities present at the station are:

- Parking lot
- Toilets

Preceding station	Israel Railways	Following station
Rehovot towards Binyamina	Binyamina–Beersheba	Ashdod–Ad Halom towards Be'er Sheva–Center
