= Sea Opera =

Residential tower complex in Netanya, Israeli

- Interactive map of the Sea Opera area

General information
- Status: Completed
- Type: Residential
- Location: Netanya, Israel
- Coordinates: 32°20′25.68″N 34°51′14.12″E
- Opening: Sea Opera 1: 2005; Sea Opera 2: 2009
- Owner: Sea Opera Ltd.

Height
- Roof: Sea Opera 1: 87 m (285 ft); Sea Opera 2: 109 m (358 ft)

Technical details
- Floor count: Sea Opera 1: 28; Sea Opera 2: 33
- Lifts/elevators: Sea Opera 1: 3 Sea Opera 2: 4

Design and construction
- Architect: Gabi Tetro
- Developer: Aharon Tavivian
- Main contractor: Danya Cebus

The Sea Opera Towers (Hebrew: אופרה על הים) is a complex of two luxury beachfront residential skyscrapers in the Israeli city of Netanya. Sea Opera 1 was completed in 2005, and is 87 metres high, with 28 floors. It was the tallest tower in the city until the completion of Sea Opera 2 in 2009. This tower is 109 metres (358 ft) high with 33 floors and was the residential tower with the most floors outside of the Gush Dan Tel Aviv Metropolitan Area and the tenth-tallest residential building in Israel. However, taller residential towers have since been built in Netanya and elsewhere.

The towers are clad in light- and dark-grey granite stone and comprise the tallest residential-only complex north of the Tel Aviv metropole. It includes a 6,500-square-metre (70,000 sq ft) park, outdoor swimming pool, jacuzzi, private sauna and gym.

== See also ==
- List of skyscrapers in Israel
