= Rehovot railway station =

Railway station in Israel

Rehovot רחובות
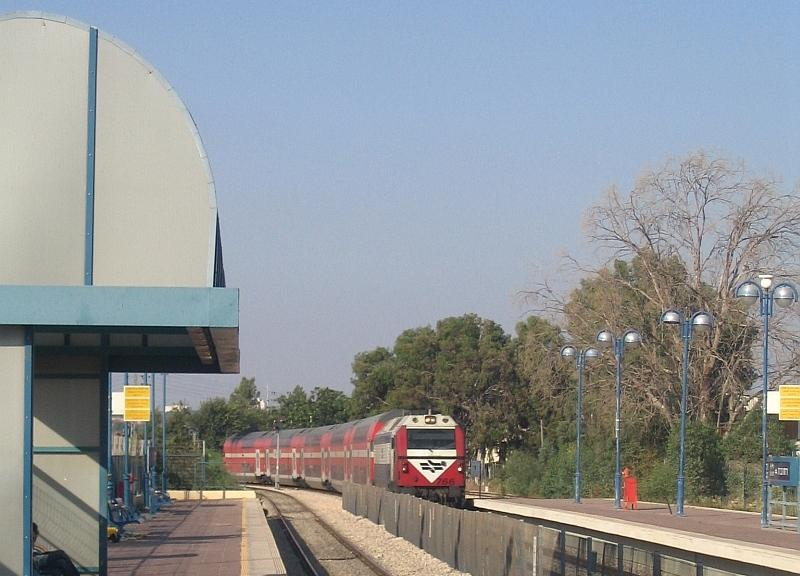

General information
- Coordinates: 31°54′32″N 34°48′23″E
- Owner: Israel Railways
- Line: Coastal railway line
- Platforms: 4
- Tracks: 4

Construction
- Parking: 150
- Accessible: yes

History
- Opened: 1 November 1920; 105 years ago
- Electrified: 10 September 2022; 3 years ago

Passengers
- 2019: 3,855,766
- Rank: 7 out of 68
Location

Rehovot railway station (Hebrew: תחנת הרכבת רחובות, Taḥanat HaRakevet Rehovot; Arabic: محطة رحوڤوت) is an Israel Railways station located in the city of Rehovot. It serves the city, the Weizmann Institute of Science and the nearby science industries park, as well as the city of Ness Ziona. The station is named after Ehud Hadar, CEO of Israel Railways between 1994 and 1996.

== Location ==
The station is situated on the Lod–Ashkelon railway. It is located in the northern part of Rehovot, 600 meters north of the main gate of the Weizmann Institute and about 1.5 km north of the city center.

== History ==
The station opened in 1920 on the historic El Kantara–Haifa railway. The station was mostly used for freight, transporting oranges from the many orchards in Rehovot to the Port of Haifa, with a daily passenger train to Jaffa. The regular passenger service was disrupted in 1927, and continued to operate sporadically during the 1930s.

During World War II the station was used by the allied forces which were sent to the North African front. The warehouses that previously housed citrus fruits were used as barracks and even as a military hospital. In 1943, a group of 714 children who escaped from Poland arrived at the station via Tehran and Port Said. This group was known in Israel as the "Tehran Children". On May 14, 1948, only hours before the Israeli Declaration of Independence, the last British military train left the station for Egypt. The citrus freight service continued until the 1960s.

The station was reopened in 1990 with a suburban service to Tel Aviv. It proved to be a major success, since most residents of Rehovot work in Tel Aviv. Following this success, extensive reconstruction work began in 2000, which included the construction of two new passenger terminals, a pedestrian tunnel under the railway, a bus terminal and two large parking lots. The renovated station opened on December 31, 2001. The Rehovot - Lod railway was double-tracked in 2001.

Following the June 21, 2005 railway disaster near Kibbutz Revadim, trains from Be'er Sheva were diverted through the Kiryat Gat – Ashkelon line and non-stop through Rehovot for a day. This led to severe disruptions of the Ashkelon - Tel Aviv suburban service. Trains from Be'er Sheva were also periodically diverted through Rehovot during the reconstruction of the Lod - Kiryat Gat line.

== Design ==
The station consists of two side platforms and an island platform, numbered 1 to 4 from north to south. Between each side platform and the island platforms there are two parallel rail tracks. Platform 4, the southernmost, was only built in the late 2010s and remains unused as of 2023.

There are two passenger terminals. The larger northern terminal serves passengers from Nes Ziyyona and the science industries park. A small bus terminal was built next to the northern terminal serving south bound buses, and all northbound buses stop on Route 412, just west of the terminal. The northern terminal houses the station manager's office, the cafeteria and toilets, as well as ticket cashiers and two ticket machines. The southern terminal mostly serves passengers from the city, the Weizmann Institute and the Hebrew University's Faculty of Agriculture and Veterinary Studies. There is a parking lot adjacent to each terminal.

Platform 1 is used for northbound trains, platform 2 for southbound trains and platform 3 is used for trains terminating at the station.

== Train service ==
The station is situated on the Tel Aviv suburban line (Binyamina/Netanya – Tel Aviv – Rehovot/Ashkelon Suburban Service). All trains in this service stop at Rehovot, and some trains terminate at the station.

On weekdays the station is served by 38 southbound and 38 northbound suburban trains. First train departs at 05:57 and last train arrives at 23:31.

== Public transport connections ==
Bus Lines:

- 4: Rehovot railway station–Ness Ziona, operated by Egged.
- 11: Rehovot railway station–Eastern Neighbourhoods, operated by Egged.
- 12: Rehovot railway station–Bilu Center, via Eastern Neighbourhoods. operated by Egged.
- 16: Rehovot railway station–Bilu Center, via Kfar Gvirol neighborhood. operated by Egged
- 17: Rehovot railway station–Kfar Gvirol neighborhood (western Rehovot). Operated by Egged.
- 18: Rehovot railway station–Kiryat Moshe neighborhood (western Rehovot). Operated by Egged.
- 24: Rehovot railway station–Beit Elazari, via Givat Brenner. Operated by Egged.
- 26: Rehovot railway station–Mazkeret Batya, via Rehovot Central Bus Station and Kiryat Ekron. Operated by Egged.
- 27: Rehovot railway station–Yatziz, via Rehovot Central Bus Station, Kiryat Ekron and Mazkeret Batya. Operated by Egged.
- 36: Rehovot railway station–Shtulim, via Gan Yavne, Gedera and Bnei Ayish. Operated by Afikim.
- 37: Rehovot railway station–Gan Yavne, via Gedera and Bnei Ayish. Operated by Afikim.
- 38: Rehovot railway station–Yesodot, via Kiryat Ekron and Highway 411. Operated by Egged.
- 40: Rehovot railway station–Bnei Re'em, via Gadera. Operated by Afikim.
- 49: Rehovot railway station–Yavne, via Rehovot Central Bus Station. Operated by Afikim.
- 201, 301, 371, 274, 164: Tel Aviv via Ness Ziona.

== Facilities ==
- Payphone
- Ticket cashier
- Ticket machine
- Buffet
- Parking lot
- Toilet
- Taxi station

Preceding station	Israel Railways	Following station
Be'er Ya'akov towards Binyamina	Binyamina–Beersheba	Yavne–East towards Be'er Sheva–Center
Be'er Ya'akov towards Netanya	Netanya–Rehovot	Terminus
