= Haim Ben-Asher =

Israeli politician

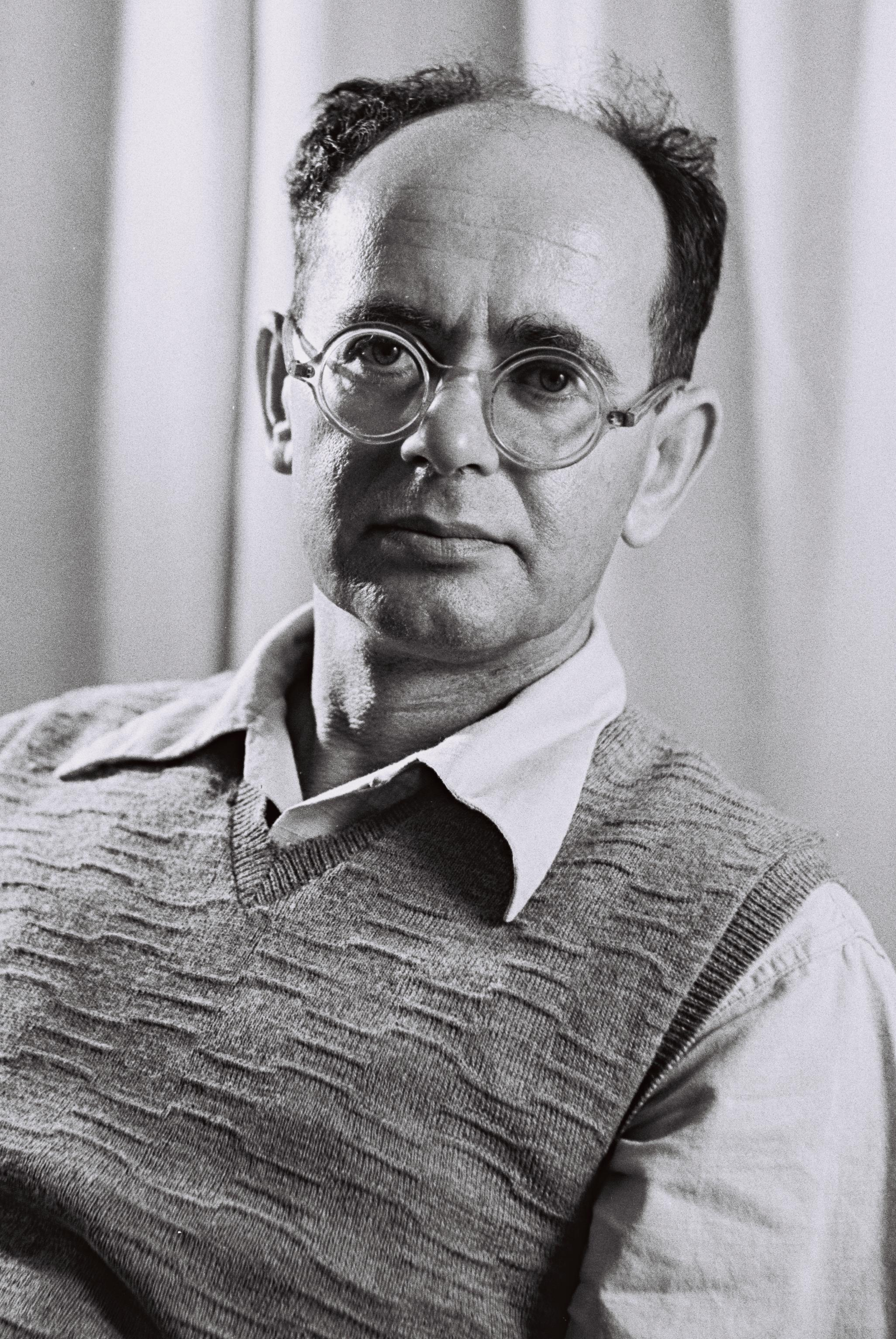
- Ben-Asher in 1951

Faction represented in the Knesset
- 1949–1955: Mapai

Personal details
- Born: 10 July 1904 Odesa, Russian Empire
- Died: 14 July 1998 (aged 94)

Haim Ben-Asher (Hebrew: חיים בן-אשר; 10 July 1904 – 14 July 1998) was an Israeli politician who served as a member of the Knesset for Mapai between 1949 and 1955.

== Biography ==
Born Haim Finkel in Odessa in the Russian Empire (today in Ukraine), Ben-Asher studied at a heder. He immigrated to Mandatory Palestine in 1924, and studied at the Hebrew University. A member of the Ein Harod platoon in the city, he was amongst the founders of kibbutz Givat Brenner in 1928, although he later moved to Netzer Sereni after the split in the HaKibbutz HaMeuhad movement. He also worked as an emissary of the HeHalutz movement in Germany and Poland. During World War II he enlisted in the Jewish Brigade. Whilst in the army, he edited The Soldier newspaper and the Jewish Brigade's magazine, HaMa'avak.

A member of Mapai's central committee, in the first Knesset elections in 1949 he won a seat on the party's list. He was re-elected in 1951, but lost his seat in the 1955 elections. In 1959 he published a book, The Future World of Yesterday. Ben-Asher also served as director of Beit Berl Academic College.

He died in 1998 at the age of 94.
