= Ramla South railway station =

Train station in Ramla, Israel

Coordinates: 31.9158°N 34.8653°E

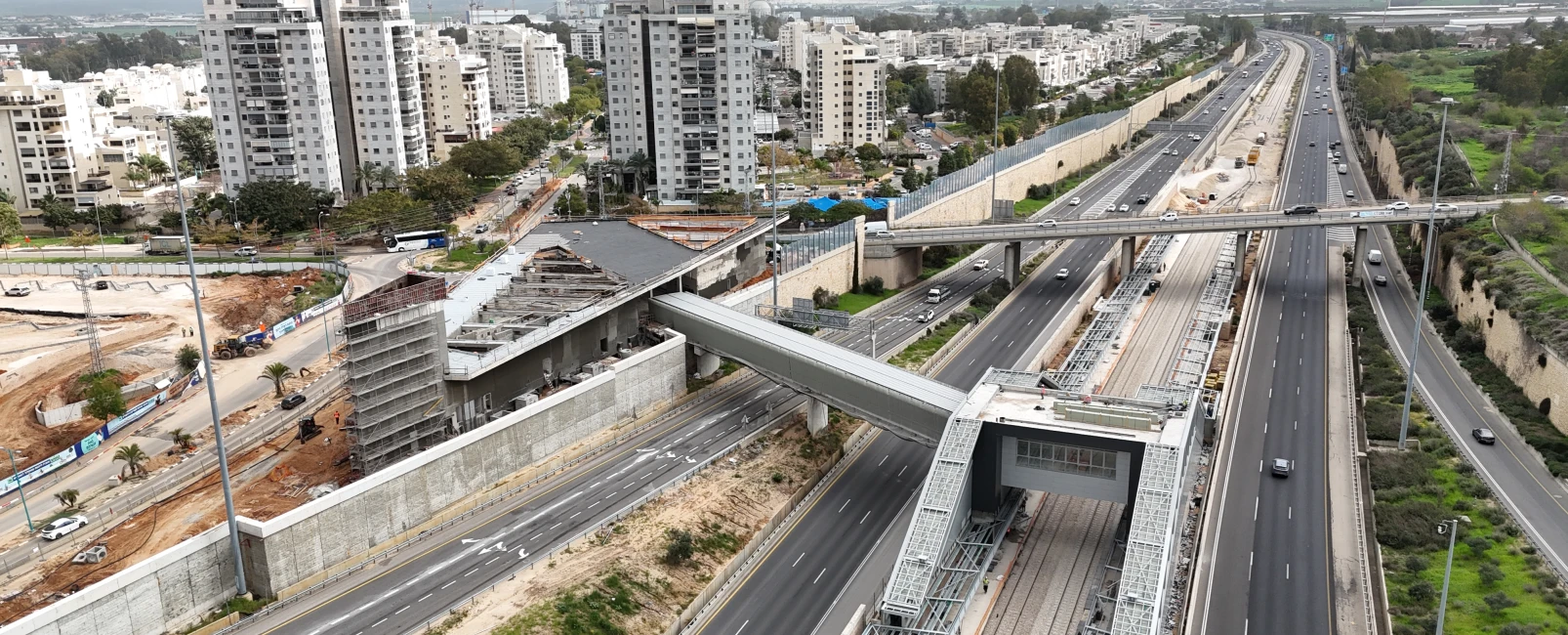

Ramla South (Hebrew: רמלה - דרום) is a railway station under construction in Ramla, Israel, forming part of the Rishon LeZion–Modi'in railway (also known as the 431 railway or Sorek railway). It is one of two entirely new stations being built as part of that project, the other being Rishon LeZion Tashach.
