= Bir Salim =

Bir Salim بئر سالم
- Village
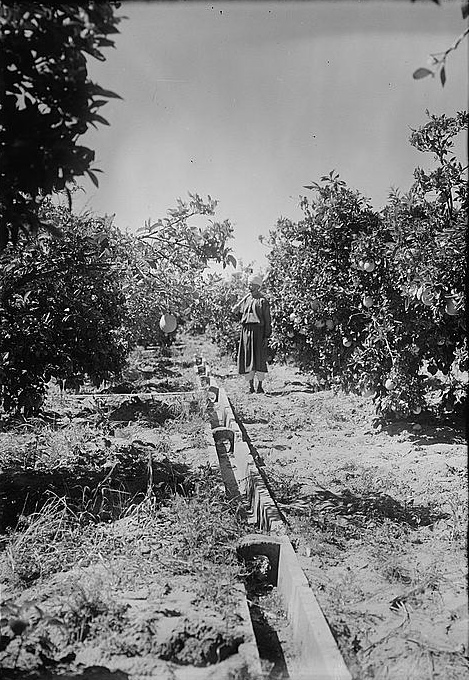
- Orange groves at Bir Salim

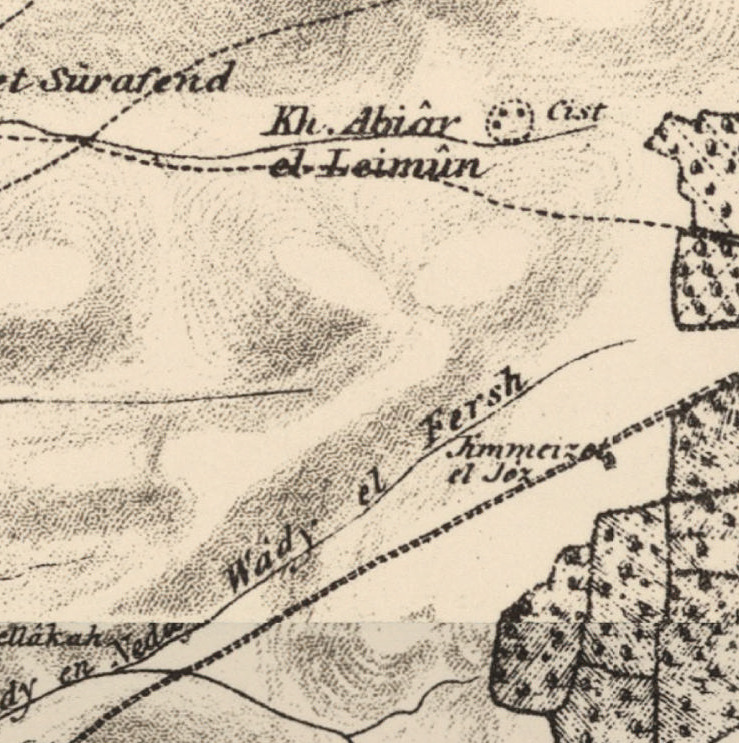
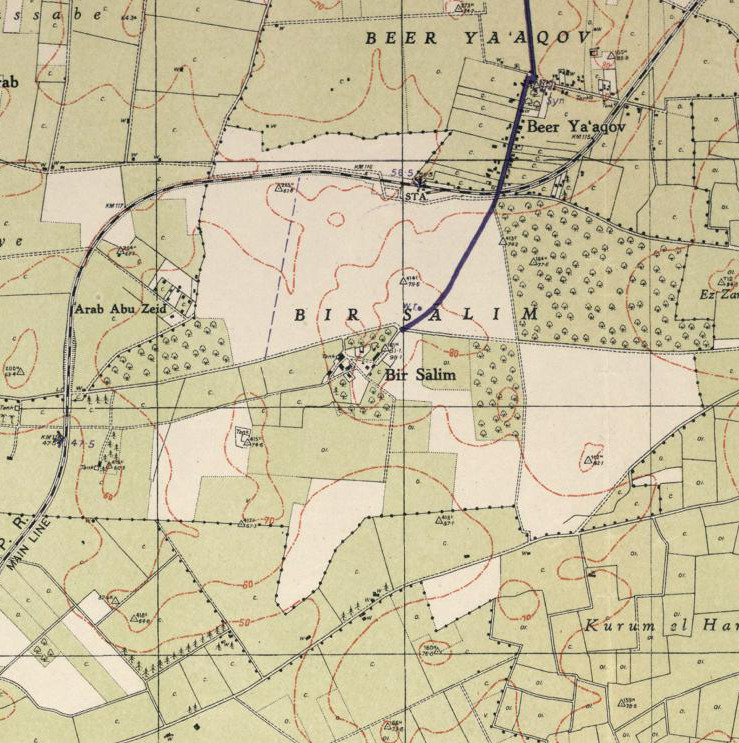
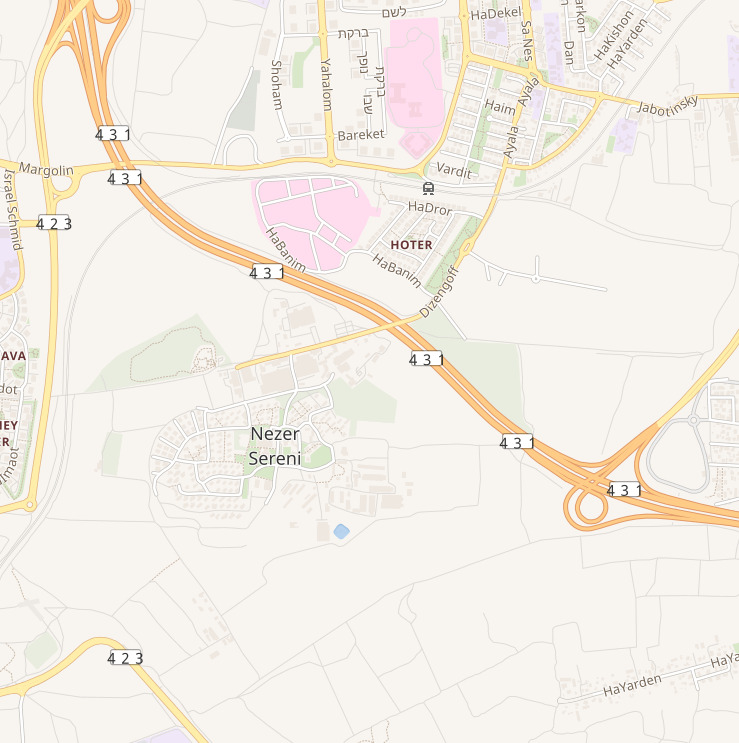
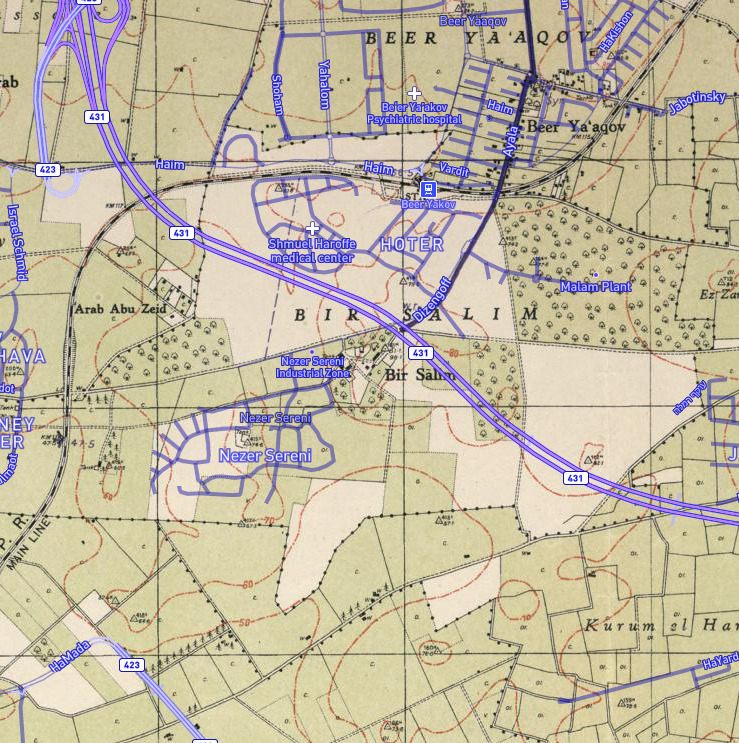
- 1870s map 1940s map modern map 1940s with modern overlay map A series of historical maps of the area around Bir Salim (click the buttons)

- Location within Mandatory Palestine
- Coordinates: 31°55′33″N 34°49′41″E
- Palestine grid: 133/148
- Geopolitical entity: Mandatory Palestine
- Subdistrict: Ramle
- Date of depopulation: May 9, 1948

Area
  - Total: 3,401 dunams (3.401 km^{2}; 1.313 sq mi)

Population (1945)
  - Total: 410
- Cause(s) of depopulation: Military assault by Yishuv forces
- Current Localities: Netzer Sereni

Bir Salim (Arabic: بئر سالم) was a Palestinian Arab village in the Ramle Subdistrict of Mandatory Palestine. It was depopulated during the 1947–48 Civil War in Mandatory Palestine on May 9, 1948, by the Givati Brigade. It was located 4 km west of Ramla.

== History ==
In the 1945 statistics, the village had a population of 410 Muslims, while the total land area was 3,401 dunams, according to an official land and population survey. Of this, 742 dunums of village land was used for citrus and bananas, 510 dunums were irrigated or used for plantations, 1,468 dunums were for cereals, while 681 dunams were classified as non-cultivable areas.

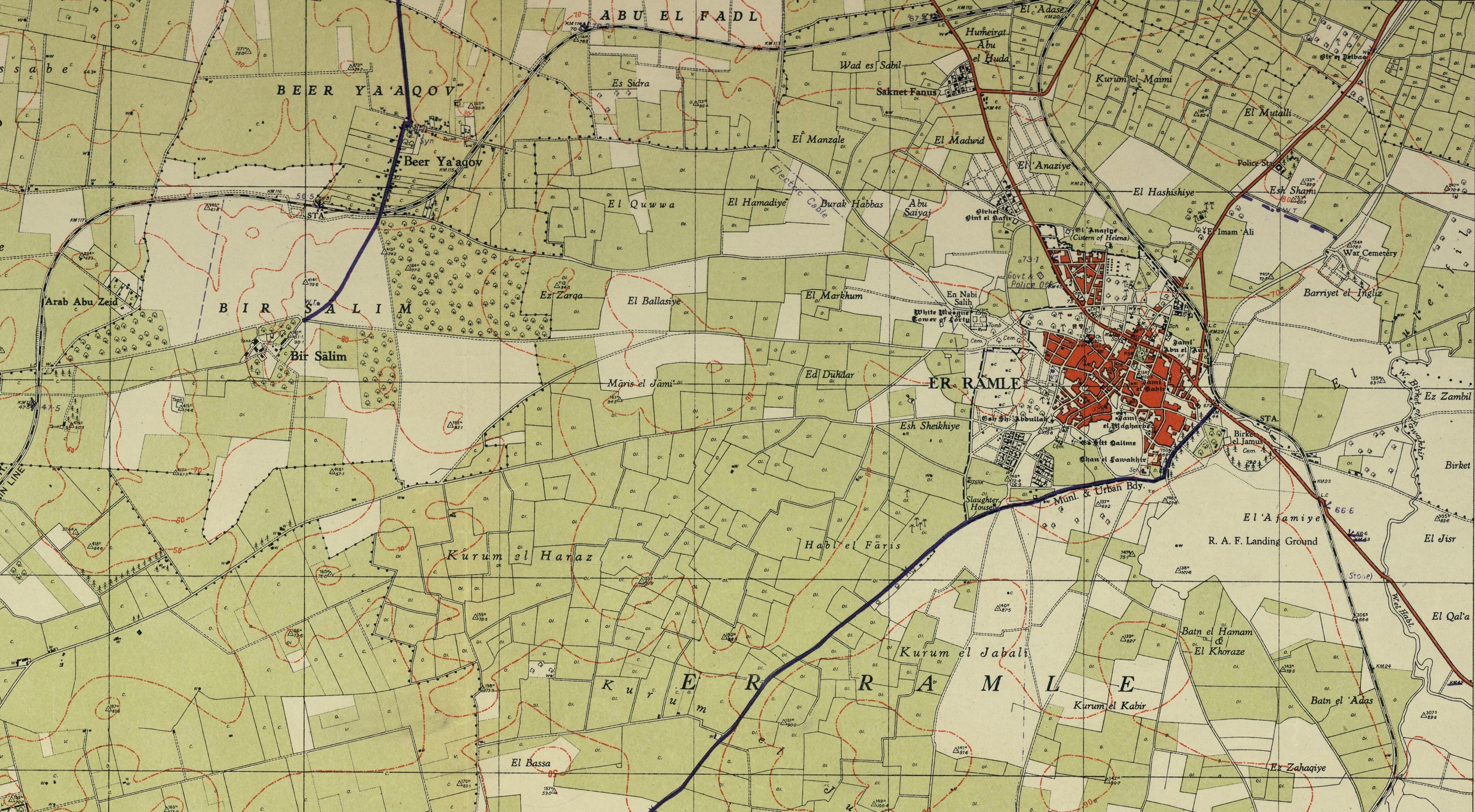
Bir Salim 1941 1:20,000

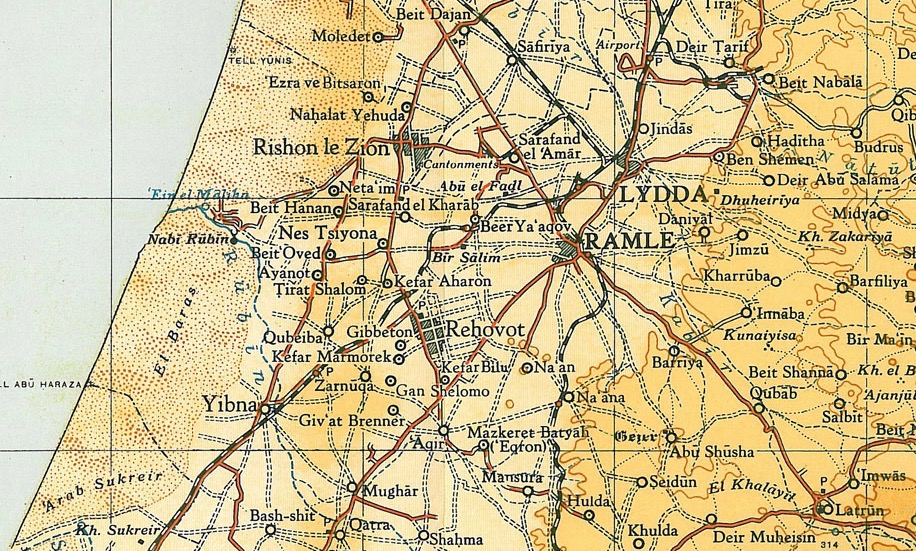
Bir Salim 1945 1:250,000

=== 1948, aftermath ===
According to a summary by the IDF Intelligence branch, Bir Salim was depopulated on 9 May 1948 after an attack on the orphanage.

Netzer Sereni was established on village land in 1948.

== See also ==
- Schneller Orphanage

== Bibliography ==
- Government of Palestine, Department of Statistics (1945). Village Statistics, April, 1945.
- Hadawi, S. (1970). Village Statistics of 1945: A Classification of Land and Area ownership in Palestine. Palestine Liberation Organization Research Center.
- Khalidi, W. (1992). All That Remains:The Palestinian Villages Occupied and Depopulated by Israel in 1948. Washington D.C.: Institute for Palestine Studies. ISBN 0-88728-224-5.
- Morris, B. (2004). The Birth of the Palestinian Refugee Problem Revisited. Cambridge University Press. ISBN 978-0-521-00967-6.
