= Yavne–West railway station =

Railway station in Israel

Yavne–West יבנה – מערב
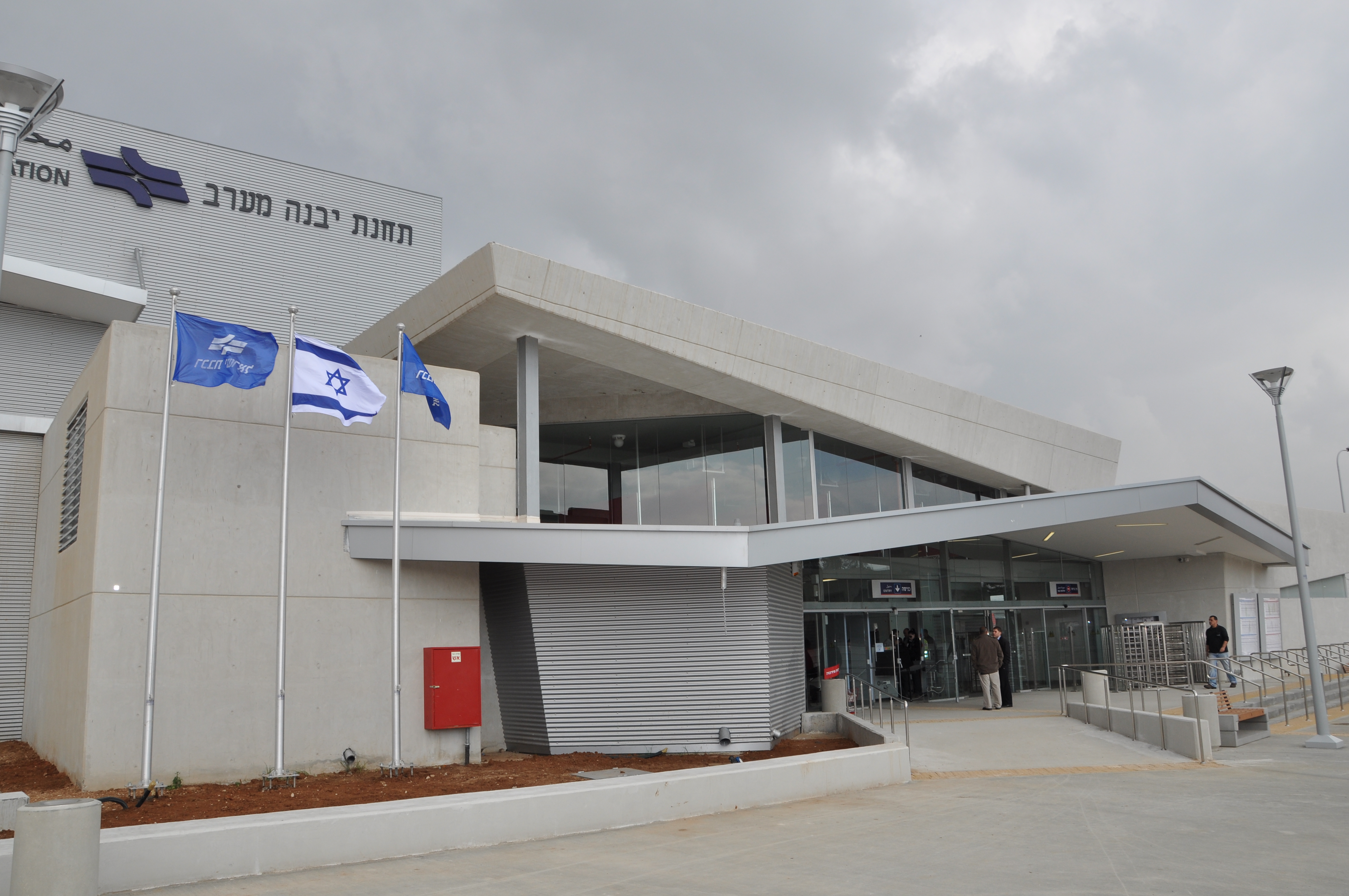
- Station Entrance

General information
- Location: Yavne, Israel
- Coordinates: 31.8912°N 34.7315°E
- Platforms: 2
- Tracks: 2

Construction
- Accessible: yes

History
- Opened: 25 February 2012; 14 years ago
- Electrified: 25 December 2021; 4 years ago

Passengers
- 2019: 1,465,638
- Rank: 31 out of 68
Location

Yavne–West railway station is a passenger railway station in Yavne, Israel and is one of two railway stations in the city (the other being Yavne East). The station is located between the Rishon LeZion Moshe Dayan railway station to the north and the Ashdod railway station to the south.

Yavne West is adjacent to Yavne's central bus station in the western part of the city and is located next to the Yavne Interchange on Highway 4.

== Design ==
The station hall is located to the east of the tracks. Yavne West currently has two side platforms connected by a pedestrian bridge serving two tracks. The far platform can be converted to an island platform for a total of three tracks at the station. Space exists for an additional side platform to be built in the future, allowing the station to accommodate a total of four tracks.

== Public transportation connections ==
The railway station is located near the Yavne central bus station from which there are several intercity bus routes to Rehovot, Ashdod, Tel Aviv and nearby towns. Additionally, to the Central Bus Station there is a bus terminal that adjacent to the railway station's entrance. The terminal has 7 intracity bus routes that serve all parts of Yavne.

== Facilities ==
Facilities present at the station are:

- Parking lot
- Toilets

Preceding station	Israel Railways	Following station
Rishon LeZion–Moshe Dayan towards Herzliya	Herzliya–Ashkelon	Ashdod–Ad Halom towards Ashkelon
