= Danya Cebus =

Israeli construction company

- Type: Private
- Founded: 1997
- Headquarters: 1C Yoni Netanyahu Street, Or Yehuda, Israel
- Number of employees: 1,744
- Parent: Africa Israel Investments
- Website: danya-cebus.co.il

Danya Cebus is an Israeli construction company. It is a subsidiary of Africa Israel Investments. It was founded in 1997. It is active in Russia, Romania, and Israel.

== History ==
In December 1960, a company called Dania Company for Development Ltd. was founded in order to build the Dania neighborhood in Haifa by investors from South Africa. In 1964, the company began building the Ramat Dania neighborhood in Jerusalem.

In April 1985, Dania Company for Development Ltd. was acquired by the Africa Israel Investments Company and became a subsidiary of Africa. In March 1986, the company changed its name to Dania Sibus Construction Company Ltd.

In 1997, the Derech Eretz company was established by Dania Sibus and other partners in order to bid for the paving and operation of the central portion of the Cross-Israel Highway, and at the end of 1999 it began paving the road.

In January 1997, Lev Leviev acquired control of Africa Israel from Bank Leumi, and reorganized its businesses. In December 1997, Dania Sibus Ltd. was incorporated as a private company fully owned by Dania Sibus Holdings (1965) Ltd. (which changed its name and is now called Africa Israel Residences Ltd.). In 2000, the company published a prospectus for a public offering, through which the company's securities were issued to the public and listed for trading on the Tel Aviv Stock Exchange. In June 2006, Africa Israel Residences was issued and listed for trading on the Tel Aviv Stock Exchange.

In December 2010, Dania Sibus Ltd. entered into an agreement with Africa Israel Investments Ltd., under which it acquired all of Africa Israel's holdings in Africa Israel Residences Ltd.

In 2015, the company's securities were delisted from trading on the Tel Aviv Stock Exchange, after a tender offer by Africa Israel Investments to the minority shareholders of the company.

In January 2018, it was reported that the Israel Police had opened an investigation in Case 1803 - a case in which, according to suspicions, Dania Sibus transferred bribery money to David Bitan while he was serving as Deputy Mayor of Rishon LeZion, in exchange for promoting the company's interests. In March 2019, the police stated that sufficient evidence had been gathered to substantiate suspicions that the company and its CEO, Ronen Ginzburg, had committed the offense of bribery.

In August 2019, an indictment was filed against the company and its CEO, Ronen Ginzburg, for offenses under the Economic Competition Law.

Following the collapse of the Barzel parking lot, which the company built, the Tel Aviv District Attorney's Office (Criminal) notified the company, Ginzburg, and other suspects that their prosecution is being considered, subject to a hearing, on suspicion of causing death by negligence of six workers at the site.

In January 2020, a debt settlement for the parent company, Africa Israel Investments, was completed, which included the sale of the company, including its ownership of the Dania Sibus company, to Lapidoth Capital, controlled by Jacob Luxenburg (80%) and Altshuler Shaham Gemel and Pension (20%). Following the sale, the company became private, but returned to the Tel Aviv Stock Exchange and was issued in February 2021.

== Company's projects ==
=== Israel ===
- Highway 431
- Motza Bridge, Highway 1
- Railway to Karmiel (tunnels, stations)
- Pais Arena
- Highway 6
- Sea Opera
