= Route 431 (Israel) =

Road in Israel

Coordinates: 31°54′35″N 34°52′56″E

Highway 431
- כביש 431
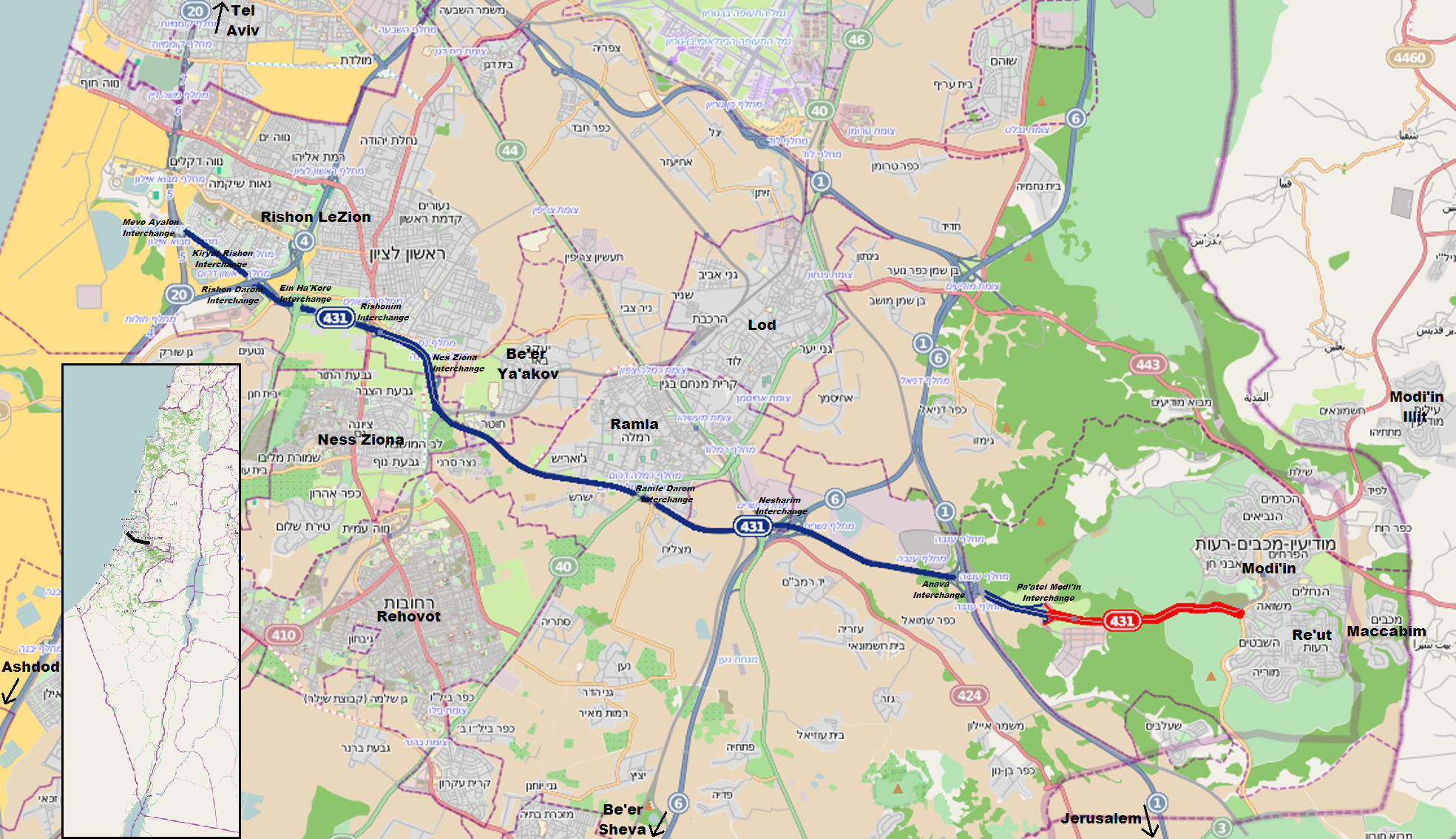

Route information
- Length: 23 km (14 mi)

Major junctions
- West end: Rishon LeZion (Mevo Ayalon Interchange)
- Mevo Ayalon Interchange; Rishon Darom Interchange; Ein HaKore Interchange; Nesharim Interchange; Anava Interchange
- East end: Modi'in

Location
- Country: Israel
- Major cities: Ness Ziona, Be'er Ya'akov, Ramla

Highway system
- Roads in Israel; Highways

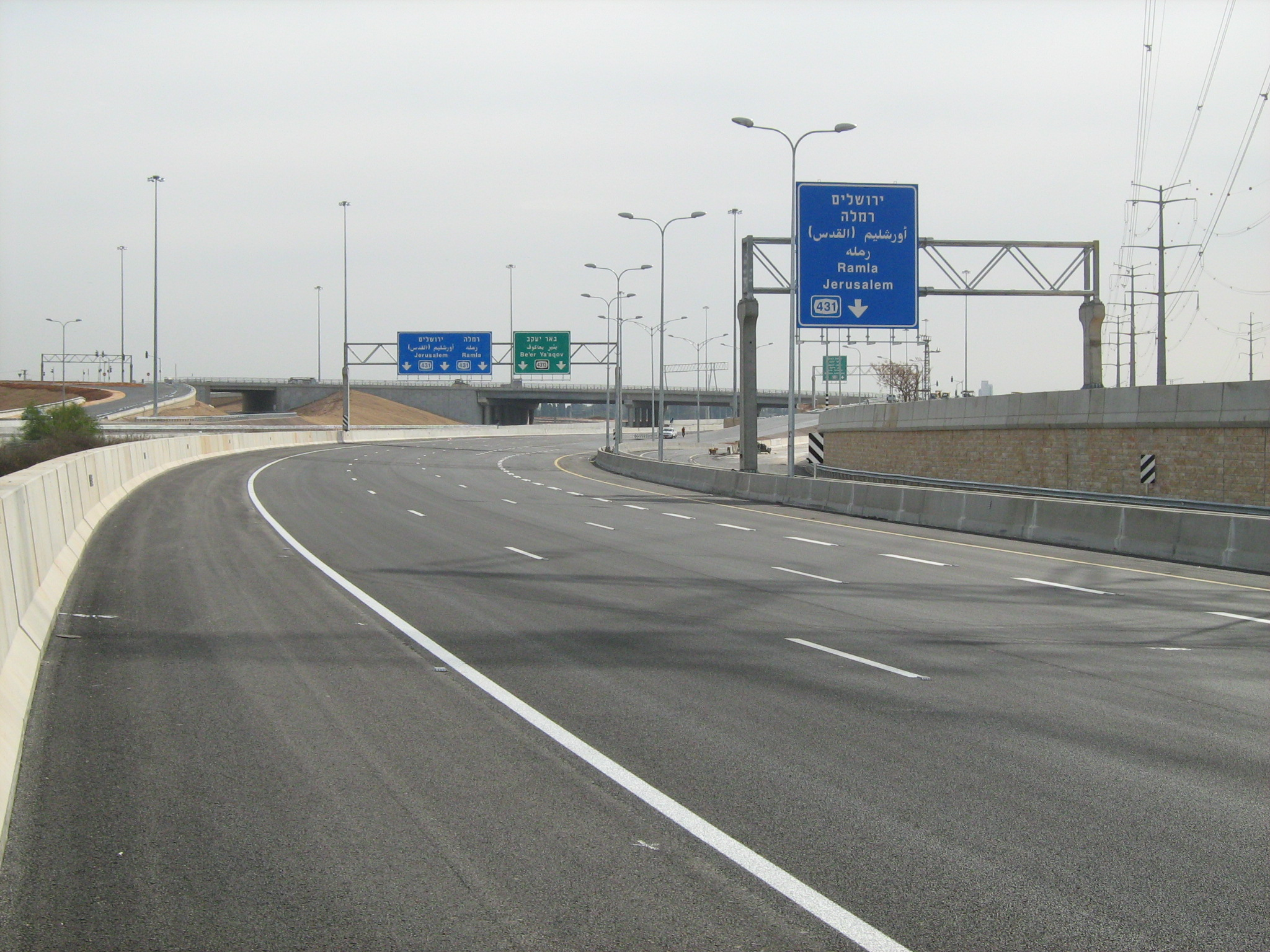
Nes Ziona Interchange

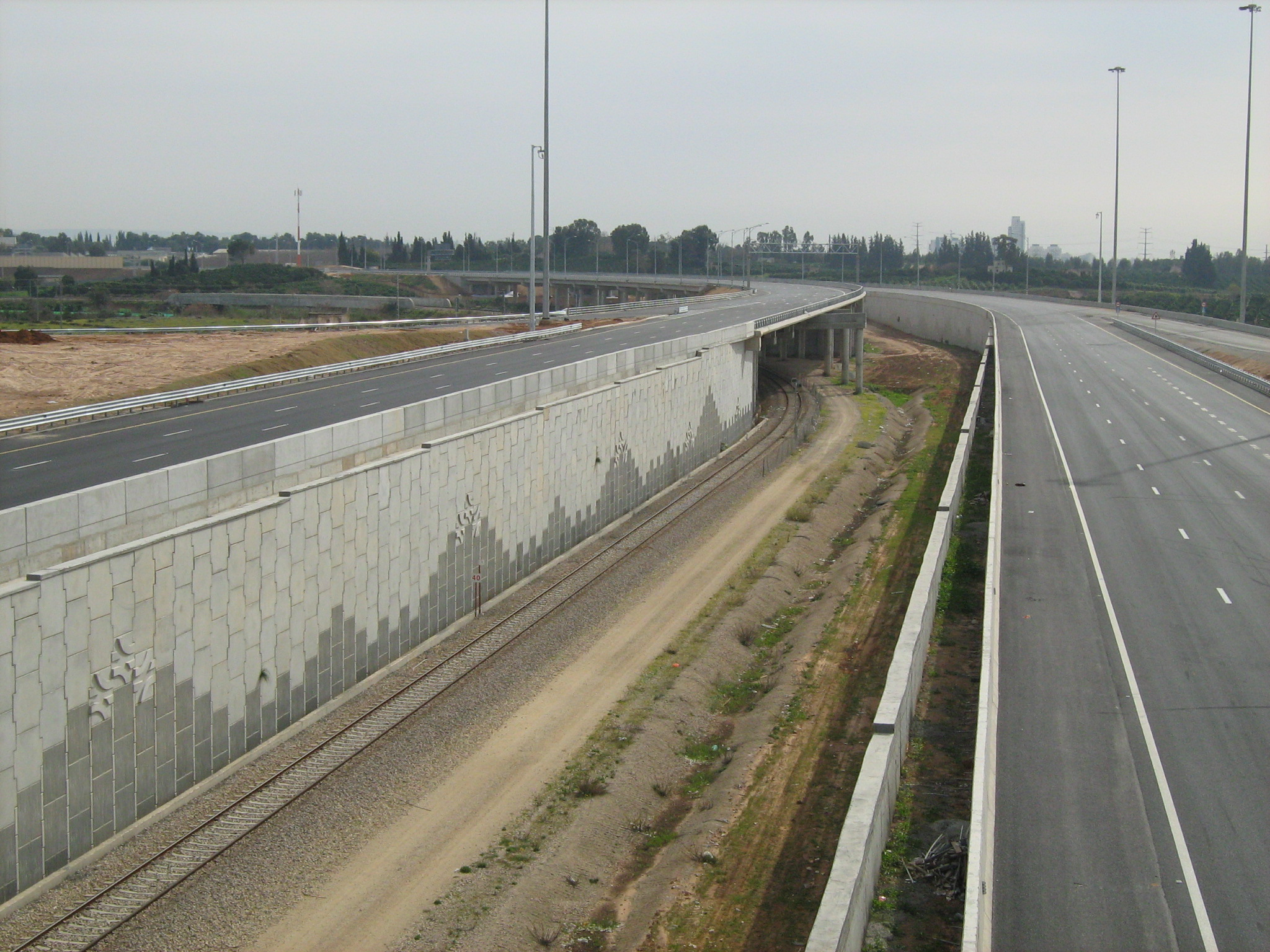
Lod - Rishon LeZion Railway entering the median strip south of Nes Ziona Interchange

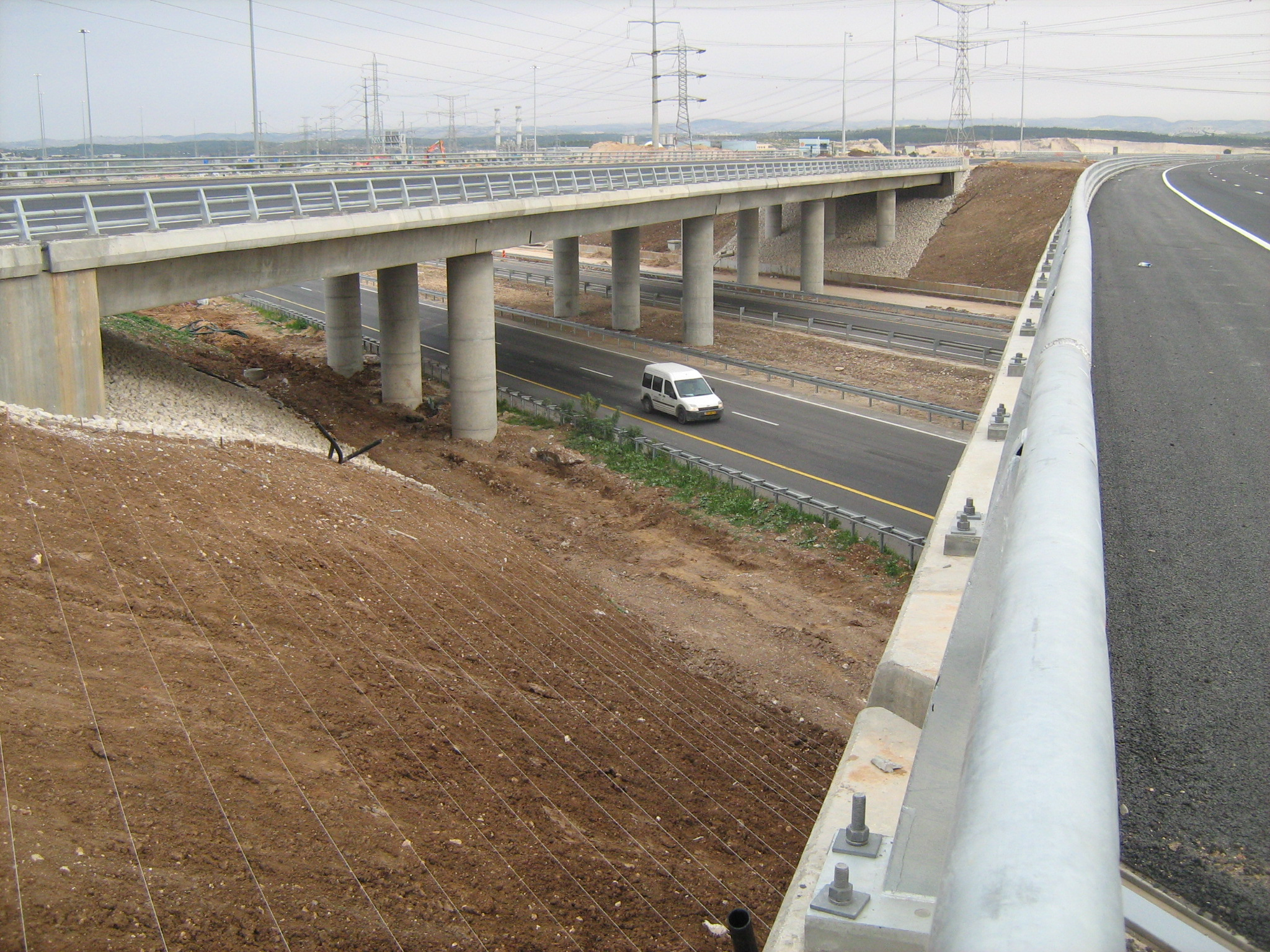
Nesharim Interchange

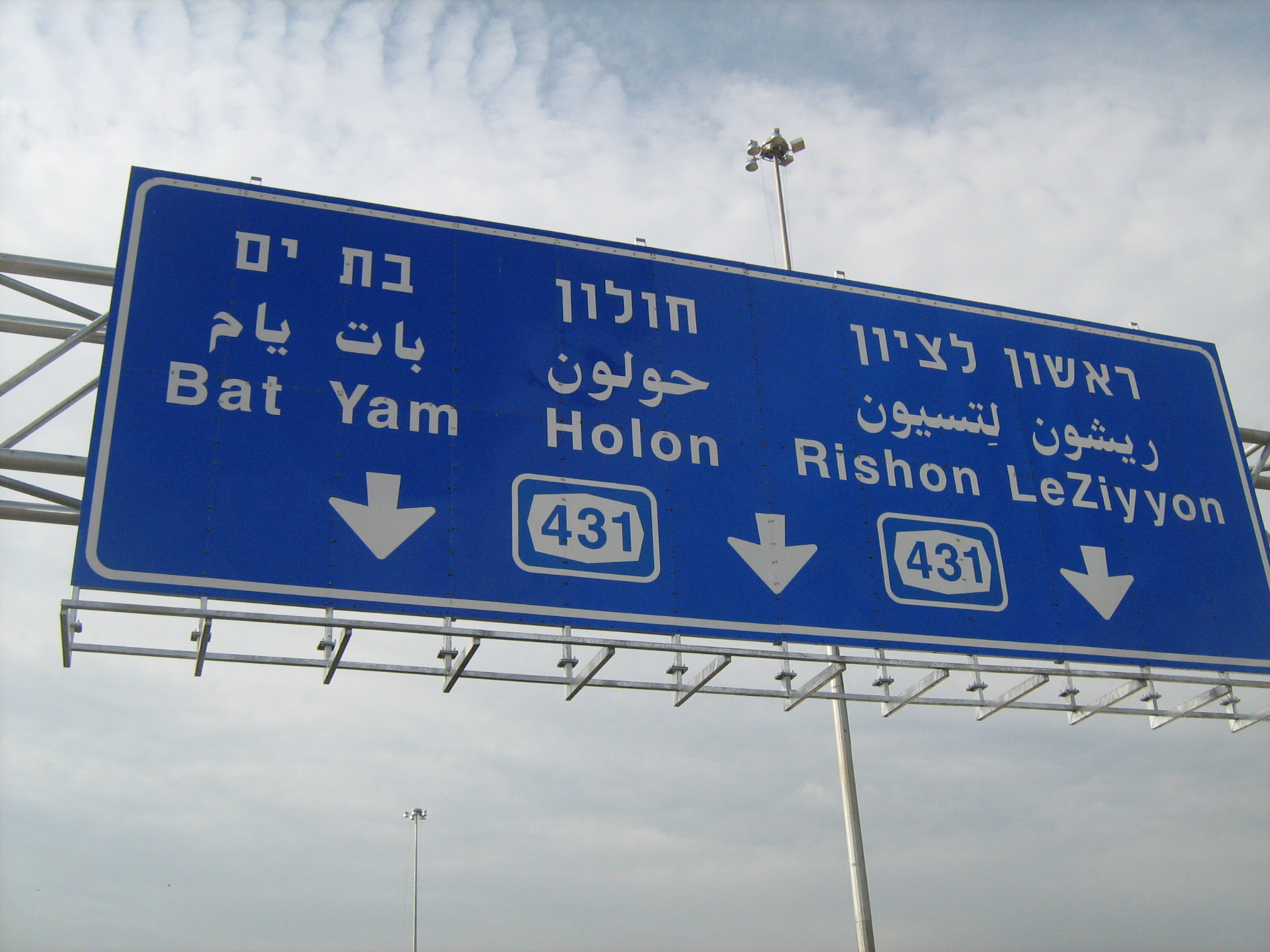
Freeway signage

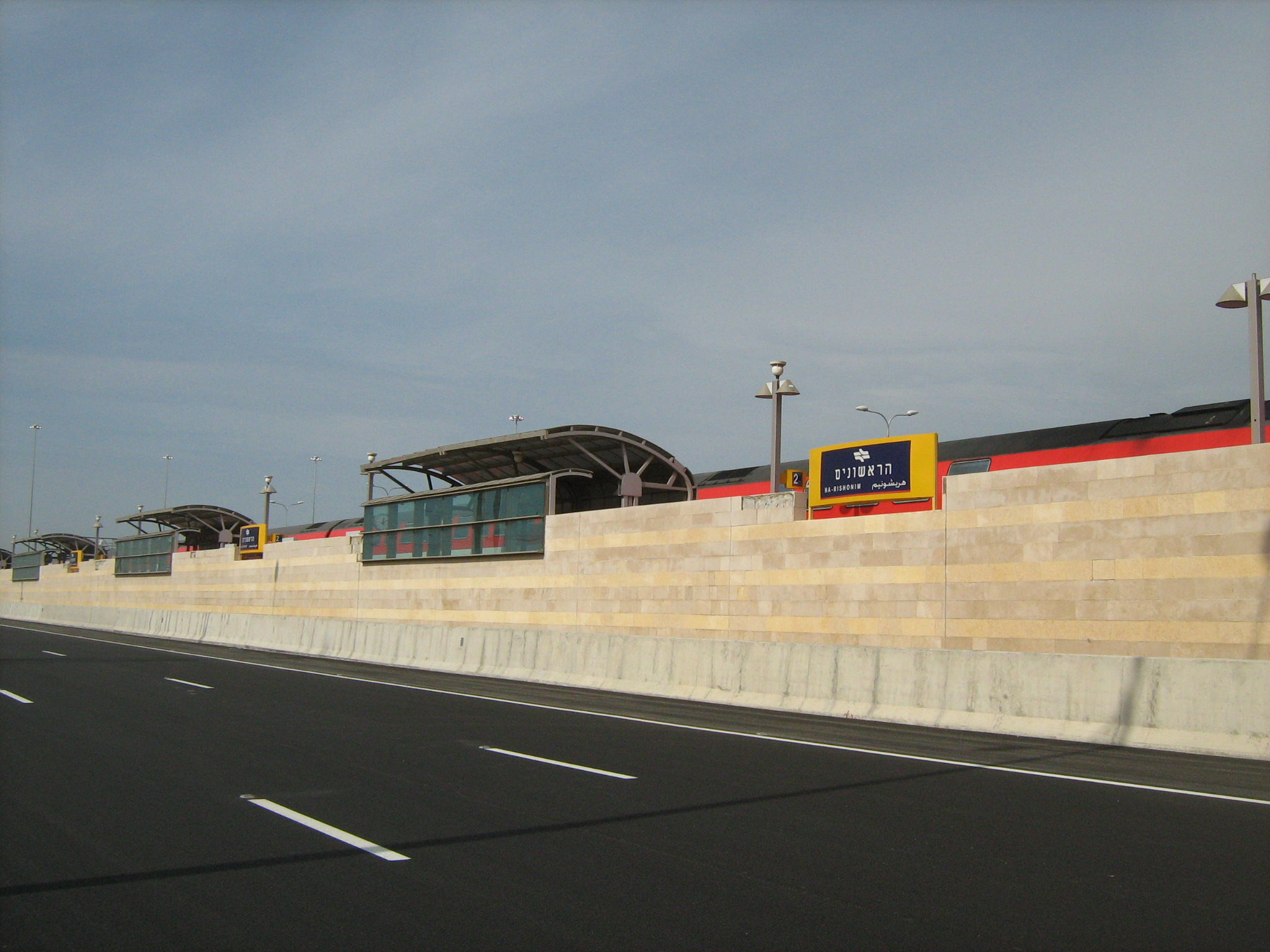
HaRishonim Railway Station

Highway 431 (Hebrew: כביש 431), is a suburban freeway in the south of the Tel Aviv Metropolitan Area in Israel. The freeway connects the Ayalon Highway in the west with Highway 1 in the east. It then continues east into Modi'in as a local road.

The freeway has six lanes (three in each direction) over a total length of 21 km. There is also a short Collector/Distributor system between Rishon Darom and Nes Ziona Interchanges. There are 12 interchanges along its length, 5 of them freeway to freeway interchanges. There are also 54 km of service roads, including exits and entrance ramps.

The design of the freeway includes a right of way for a double track railway in its median between Ein HaKore and Modi'in. Railway sections are currently operational between Be'er Yaakov and HaRishonim Interchange, and between Anava Interchange and Modi'in; construction of the Rishon LeZion–Modi'in railway began in 2019. The freeway and railway also cross three existing railway lines along the route and the design allows for a connection to two of them.

Highway 431 is the first PFI project in Israel. Netivey HaYovel, a subsidiary of Danya Cebus and Africa Israel Investments Ltd., was awarded the 25 year tender to build, maintain and operate the freeway. As of October 16, 2014, the cost of the freeway had been 2.5 billion NIS (approximately US$620 million). Following the completion of the freeway in February 2016, the company is expecting a 200 million NIS (US$50 million) grant from the state.

== History ==
Construction started in 2005 and the road was fully opened 4 February 2009.

A section of the highway between Mevo Ayalon Interchange and Gan Ha'Vradim Interchange was set to open 23 October 2008, approximately 3 months ahead of schedule. However, on 22 October, it was announced that the opening will be postponed for at least two weeks due to Netivey HaYovel's failure to complete the required environmental mitigation, as was the case of Jerusalem Route 9. The road finally opened 12 November, after Danya Cebus agreed to place several million NIS as a guarantee that the required works will be carried out.

The second section between Gan Ha'Vradim Interchange and Anava Interchange opened on the evening of 4 February 2009. Although the freeway was fully opened at this point, there was some work left around it. At Ein Ha'Kore, the Road 4311 bridge over Highway 42 has not been completed leaving a traffic light at what was planned to be a grade-separated freeway segment, and at Nesharim Interchange the western exits have yet to open. The exits at Nesharim opened 20 May 2009, and the bridge at Ein Ha'Kore opened 29 June 2009. All other works along the freeway were finished by September 2009.

The local road in Modi'in was partially opened together with the freeway, initially with one lane in each direction. Construction on this section was completed in November 2009, providing a limited-access, multiple lane, grade-separated highway all the way from the Ayalon Highway near the Mediterranean coast to the entrance to Modi'in.

Starting in May 2010, electronic signs for a traffic control system were installed along the freeway.

== Interchanges ==
km	Name	Type	Meaning	Location	Highway(s) Crossed
0	מחלף מבוא איילון (Mevo Ayalon Interchange)		Ayalon Gateway	Rishon LeZion	Highway 20 (Israel) (northbound)
1	מחלף קרית ראשון (Kiryat Rishon Interchange)		named after neighborhood	Rishon LeZion	Mota Gur St.
2	מחלף ראשון דרום (Rishon Darom Interchange)		South Rishon	Rishon LeZion	Highway 4 (southbound)
3	מחלף עין הקורא (En Ha'Kore Interchange)		presumed biblical location (possibly incorrect); The Korei Spring	Rishon LeZion	Highway 4 (northbound); Highway 42; Road 4311
5	מחלף הראשונים (HaRishonim Interchange)		named after neighborhood and railway station ult. HaRishonim	Rishon LeZion; Ness Ziona	Route 412 (Herzl St.)
6	מחלף נס ציונה (Nes Ziona Interchange)		Banner to Zion	Ness Ziona; Rishon LeZion; Be'er Ya'akov	Road 4313
9	מחלף רמלה מערב (Ramla Ma'arav Interchange)		West Ramla	Ramla	Route 200
11	מחלף רמלה דרום (Ramla Darom Interchange)		South Ramla	Ramla	Highway 40
14	מחלף נשרים (Nesharim Interchange)		Eagles named after nearby Nesher Factory & ult. Rambam, the great Eagle	Ramla	Highway 6 Highway 44; Route 424
Planned
17	מחלף רג"מ (RaGaM Interchange)		named after location of planned industrial park bordering 3 areas: Ramla, Gezer & Modi'in	planned RaGaM Industrial Park	local road
20	מחלף ענבה (Anava Interchange)		Berry named after Anava (Anabe) Stream	Kfar Shmuel	Highway 1
22.8	מחלף פאתי מודיעין (Pa'atei Modi'in Interchange)		Outskirts of Modi'in	Pa'atei Modi'in Railway Station; Yishpro Shopping Center	HaMal'achut Blvd.
24.4	מחלף נופים (Nofim Interchange)			Modi'in; Yishpro Shopping Center	HaHamam Blvd.
26.4				Modi'in	Yehuda HaMaccabee St.
26.45				Modi'in	Tzukit St.
26.6				Modi'in	Shaldag St.
27.6				Modi'in	Yitzhak Rabin Blvd. HaHashmona'im Blvd.
