= Netzer Sereni =

Kibbutz in central Israel

Netzer Sereni: נֵצֶר סֶרֶנִי (Hebrew)
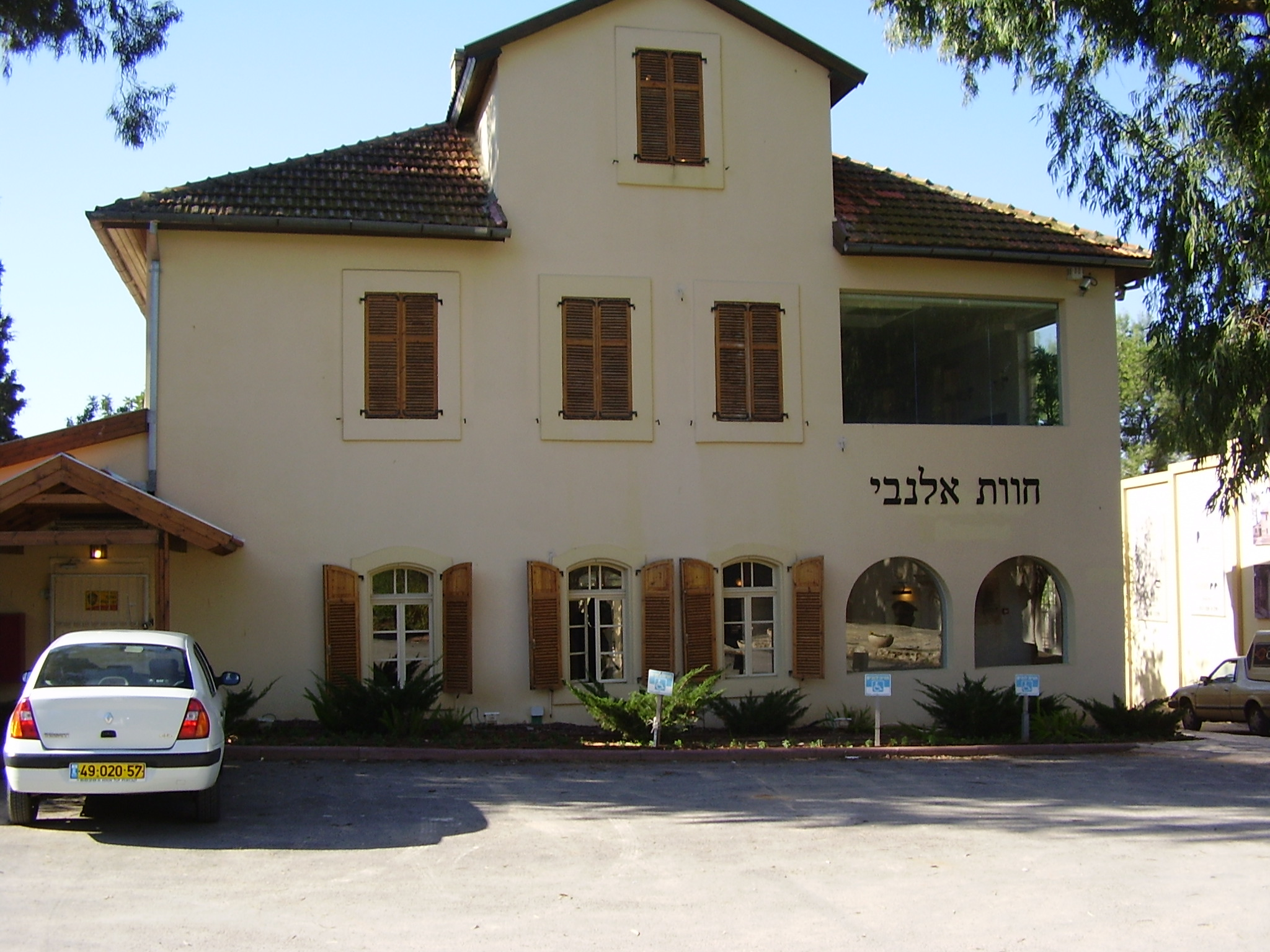
- Havat Allenby

- Location within Central Israel
- Coordinates: 31°55′21″N 34°49′20″E
- Country: Israel
- District: Central
- Subdistrict: Ramla
- Council: Gezer
- Affiliation: Kibbutz Movement
- Founded: 20 June 1948
- Founder: Holocaust survivors
- Population (2024): 1,115

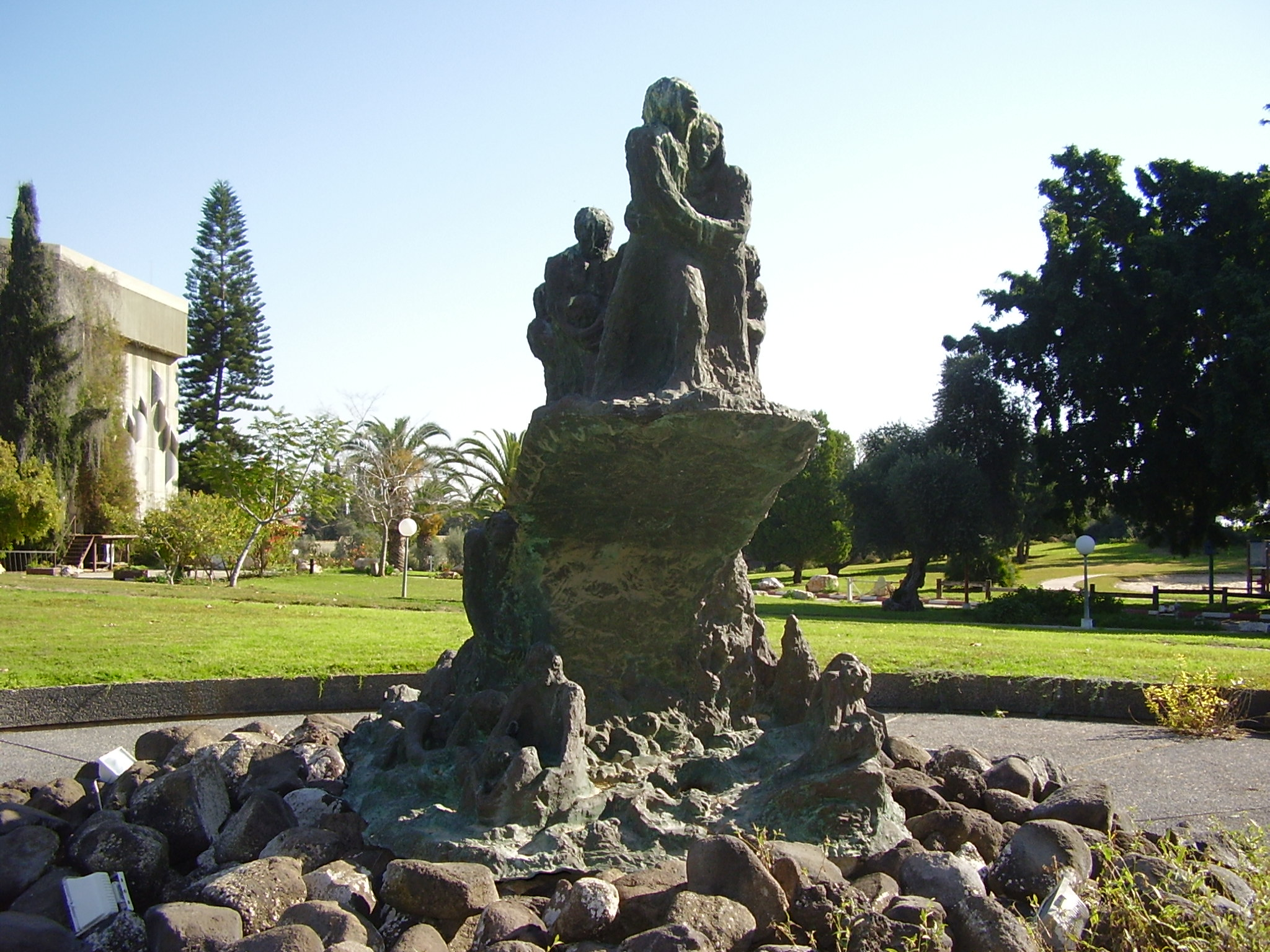
Holocaust memorial in Netzer Sereni

Netzer Sereni (Hebrew: נֵצֶר סֶרֶנִי) is a kibbutz in central Israel. Located in the Shephelah between Be'er Ya'akov and Ness Ziona, it falls under the jurisdiction of Gezer Regional Council. In 2024 it had a population of 1,115.

== History ==
Kibbutz Netzer Sereni was founded in 1948 by Holocaust survivors liberated from Buchenwald concentration camp, who had established themselves in 1945 as "Kibbutz Buchenwald", an agricultural collective designed to prepare Jews for life in Palestine, the first such Hakhshara group established in Germany after the war. The kibbutz was established on the site of the Palestinian village of Bir Salim, which was evacuated in 1948 under orders from authorities in nearby Ramle, despite requests from the local mukhtar to the Haganah asking for protection. In October 1949, the name was changed to "Netzer" (a Hebrew word meaning "scion", "shoot", "sprout") by the Government Naming Committee.

Between 1948 and 1951 antagonism between the Mapam and Mapai parties led to a split within the kibbutz movement, and in 1952 120 Mapai members of kibbutz Givat Brenner broke away for ideological reasons and moved to Netzer Sereni.

In 1952, following the arrival of roughly fifty families from Givat Brenner, they requested to rename the kibbutz Netzer Sereni after Enzo Sereni, a Jewish Italian intellectual, Zionist leader and Jewish Brigade officer. Sereni was one of the founders of Givat Brenner. He was parachuted into Nazi-occupied Italy in World War II, only to be immediately captured by the Germans and executed in Dachau concentration camp.

The Government Naming Committee objected to the usage of the non-Hebrew name "Sereni", and ordered the kibbutz to adopt the name "Netzer Haim", "haim" meaning "life" in Hebrew and having been Enzo Sereni's Hebrew name. The poet Natan Alterman advocated for the usage of "Netzer Sereni" in his column in the Davar newspaper. Mapai Knesset member Haim Ben-Asher, a kibbutz member who had been a personal friend of Enzo Sereni, felt an obligation to honor Sereni's original name. In January 1955, he began legislative proceedings designed to force the Government Naming Committee to adopt the name "Netzer Sereni", on the grounds that following the tragic death of Enzo Sereni's only son Daniel in a plane crash over Maagan the previous year, the name "Sereni" had been discontinued. In June 1955, the Government Naming Committee announced that although it continued - and would continue - to keep the Hebrew name, it agreed, out of respect for the Knesset, to change the name of the settlement to "Netzer Sereni."

== In popular culture ==
The 2023 Israeli musical film Victory focuses on two fictional couples from Netzer Sereni.

== Notable people ==
- Eyal Ben-Reuven
