= Rishon LeZion–Moshe Dayan railway station =

Israel Railways station in Rishon LeZion

Rishon LeZion–Moshe Dayan ראשון לציון – משה דיין
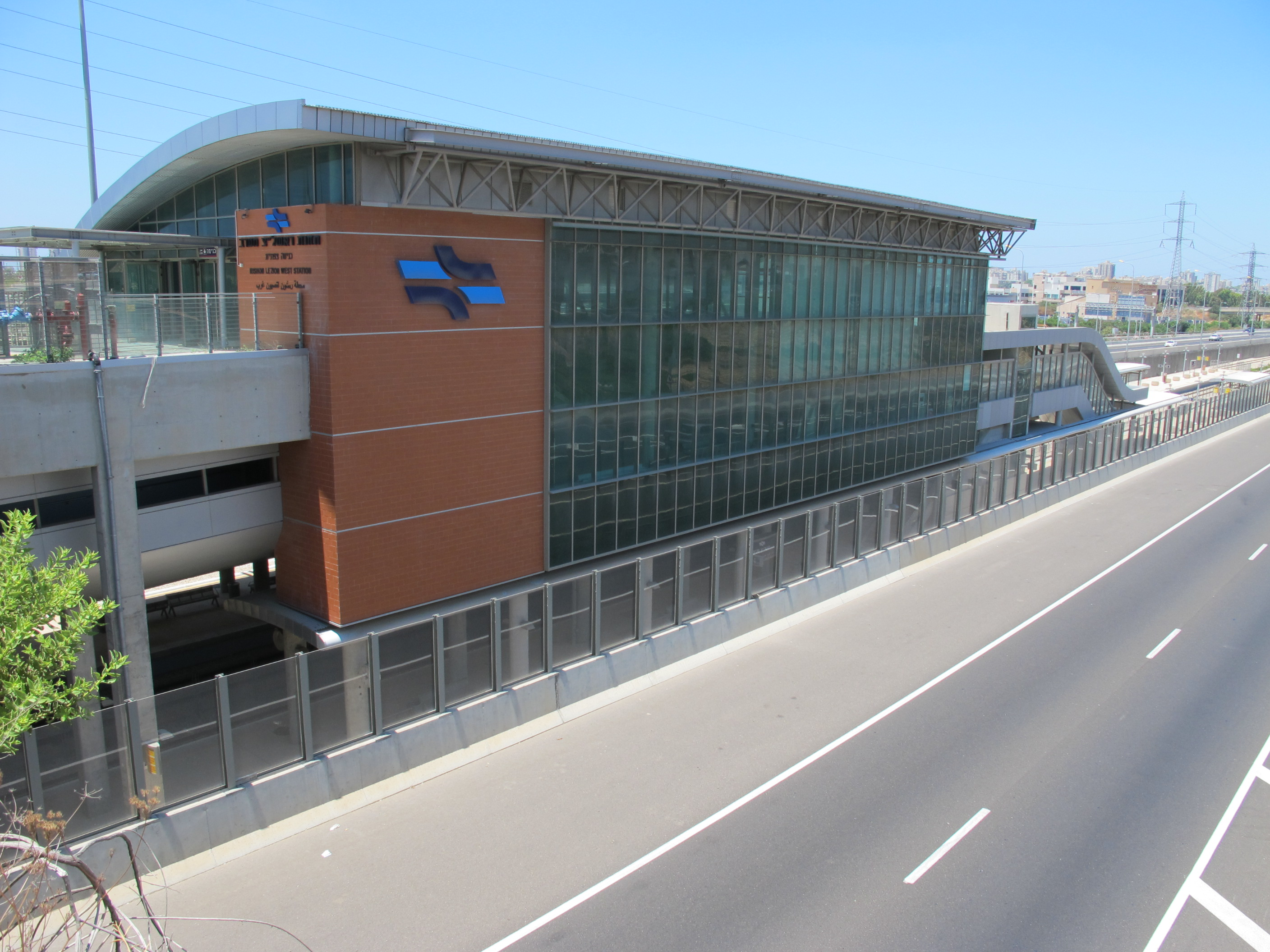

General information
- Location: Moshe Dayan Interchange (Ayalon Highway), Rishon LeZion, Israel
- Coordinates: 31.9879°N 34.7574°E
- Owner: Israel Railways
- Platforms: 2
- Tracks: 4

Construction
- Platform levels: 2
- Parking: 450 spaces
- Accessible: yes

History
- Opened: 25 September 2011; 14 years ago
- Electrified: 25 December 2021; 4 years ago

Passengers
- 2019: 2,217,849
- Rank: 23 out of 68

Services
Preceding station	Israel Railways	Following station
Bat Yam–Komemiyut towards Herzliya	Herzliya–Ashkelon	Yavne–West towards Ashkelon
Location

The Rishon LeZion–Moshe Dayan railway station is an Israel Railways station in Rishon LeZion. The station is located adjacent to the Moshe Dayan Interchange on the Ayalon Highway. It serves as the terminus of a new suburban passenger line serving the cities of Holon, Bat Yam, and Rishon LeZion in southern Gush Dan. Current travel time from the station to Tel Aviv HaHagana railway station is about 18 minutes.

== Future service ==
The railway line south of the station was extended to the new Yavne West railway station in 2012 and connects with the existing Lod–Ashkelon railway since 2013, thereby offering improved and more direct train service from Tel Aviv to the cities of Yavne, Ashdod, and Ashkelon. Moshe Dayan also serves as a stop on new inter-city services to those cities. From Ashkelon a new railway line has been built to Beersheva and the station serves trains headed there as well.

Rishon LeZion Moshe Dayan is planned to serve as the western terminus for the future Rishon LeZion–Modi'in railway. A few hundred meters south of the station, a currently unused railway tunnel will allow trains to pass under the Ayalon Highway and travel eastward to Rishon LeZion HaRishonim railway station, from which the new line will continue to reach Modi'in and Jerusalem beyond.

It is anticipated that an extension to the Red Line LRT of the Tel Aviv Light Rail will make Moshe Dayan Station the future southern terminus of the Red Line LRT. The under construction Green Line LRT will also terminate at the station, proposed start is in 2028. And there are plans for a Brown Line BRT, connecting the station with suburbs in the Southeast.
