= Rishon LeZion–HaRishonim railway station =

Railway station in Israel

Rishon LeZion–HaRishonim ראשון לציון – הראשונים
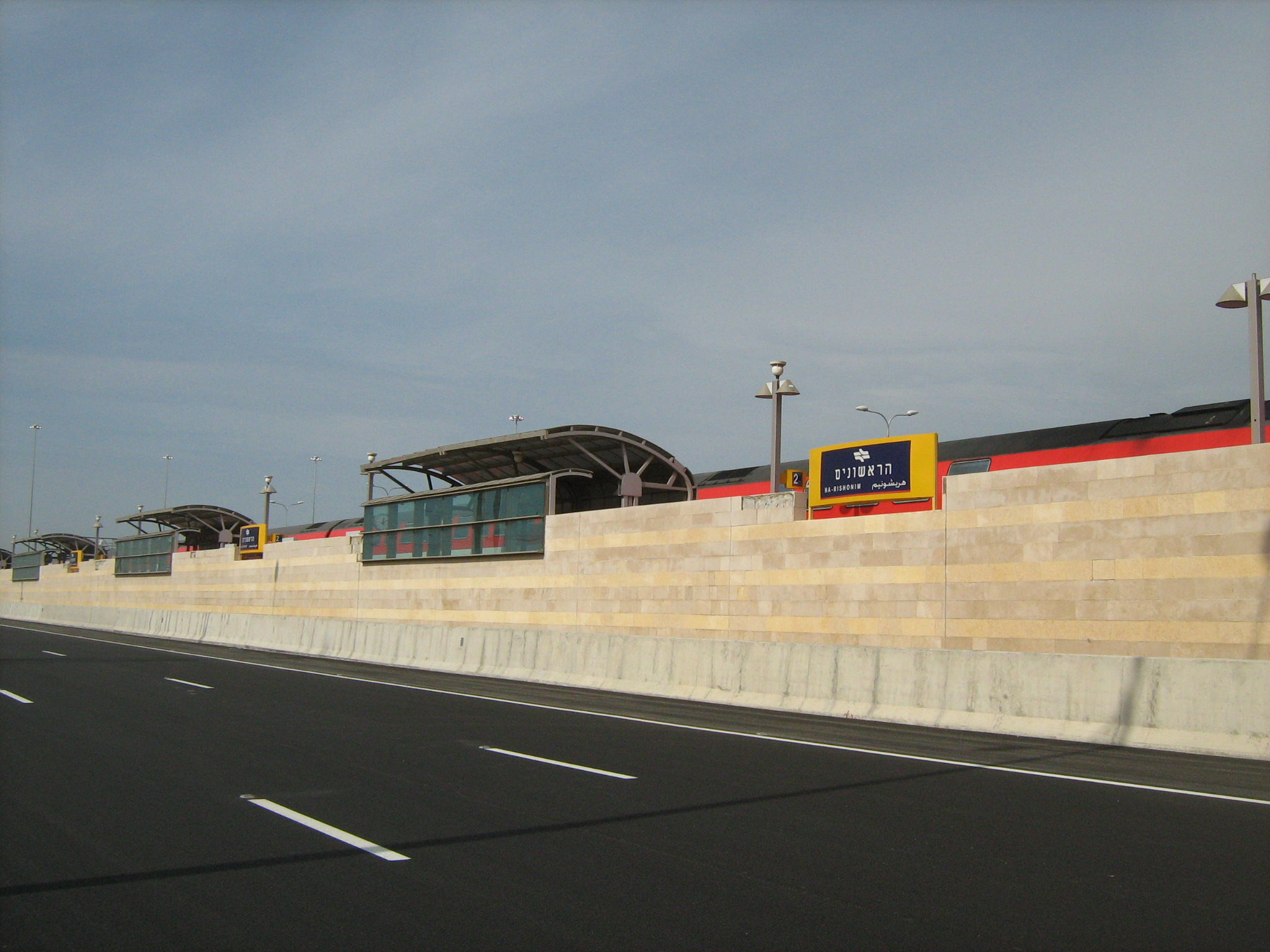

General information
- Location: Rishon LeZion, Israel
- Coordinates: 31°56′55.95″N 34°48′7.26″E
- Platforms: 2
- Tracks: 2

History
- Opened: September 13, 2003

Passengers
- 2019: 360,136
- Rank: 59 out of 68
Location

Rishon LeZion–HaRishonim railway station (Hebrew: תחנת הרכבת ראשון לציון – הראשונים, Tahanat HaRakevet Rishon LeTziyon HaRishonim) is a station of Israel Railways in Rishon LeZion, part of the Tel Aviv – Rishon LeZion line. The station is located in the southern area of the city, in the middle of HaRishonim Interchange, at the intersection of the new Highway 431 and Route 412 (Rishon LeZion – Nes Ziona road). It was opened on September 13, 2003, with the Beit Shemesh railway station. The station has two platforms. It is the southern terminus of the suburban line to Netanya.

HaRishonim station is currently built as a terminus, not allowing through traffic in its current configuration.

At the current time, the only service that reaches the station is a cut short hourly shuttle train to Lod. The service generally uses platform 1.

== Access ==
The station is located between the lanes of highway 431, with the entrance facing route 412. A parking area and a bus terminal are located to the North of highway 431, adjacent to the station. Another bus station is located on route 412, in front of the entrance. The entrance to the parking area is via Nîmes Boulevard.

Egged bus lines 164 and 201, as well as Kavim bus line 247 pass along route 412; between Rishon LeZion city center and Ness Ziona and stop at the station entrance (Kavim line 247 also continues to Be'er Ya'akov). Egged line 174 runs along route 412 within Rishon LeZion and terminates at the station terminal. Egged lines 11, 11A and 20 connect the station's bus terminal with the eastern neighborhoods of Rishon LeZion, and Egged line 17A connects the terminal with the western neighborhoods. Two more bus routes to the west of the city are Dan lines 19 and 129, which reach the terminal during mornings and noons.

== Plans ==
There are plans to continue the railway from the station to the west of the city and connect the station with the Rishon LeZion Moshe Dayan railway station on the Tel Aviv–Holon–Yavne (west)–Ashdod line. The future extension is supposed to include two more stations in the west of the city and when completed, will create a loop track starting and ending in Tel Aviv. Another plan is to continue the railway tracks eastwards between the lanes of highway 431 towards Modi'in and the high-speed railway to Jerusalem and right of way has been reserved for this purpose during the construction of highway 431 along the entire route.
