= Rosh HaAyin–South railway station =

Railway station near Rosh HaAyin, Israel

Rosh HaAyin–South ראש העין – דרום
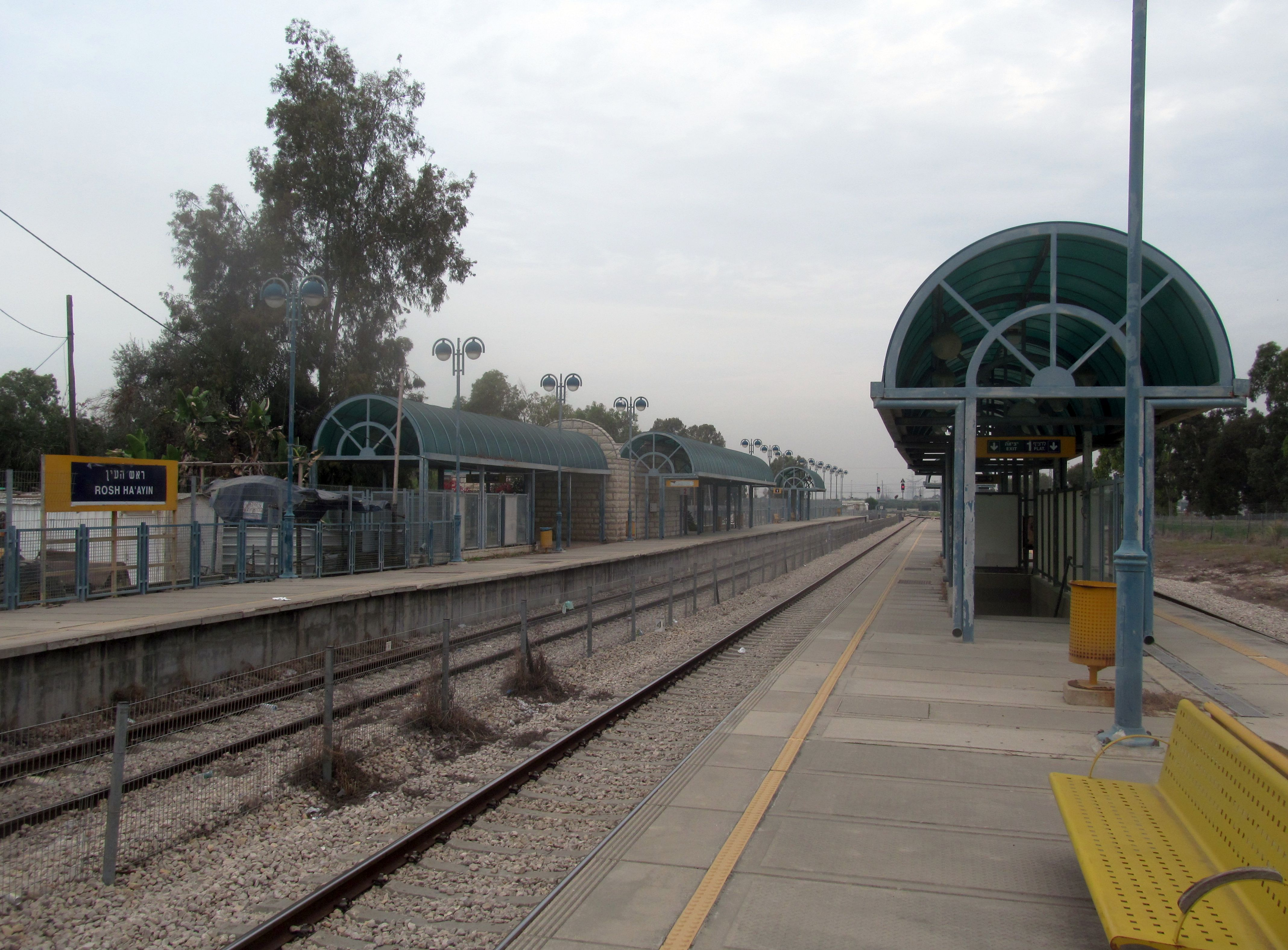
- The disused platforms in 2017

General information
- Coordinates: 32°06′15″N 34°56′05″E
- Owner: Israel Railways
- Line: Eastern Railway
- Platforms: 2
- Tracks: 3

History
- Opened: 1915
- Closed: 13 April 2003
Location

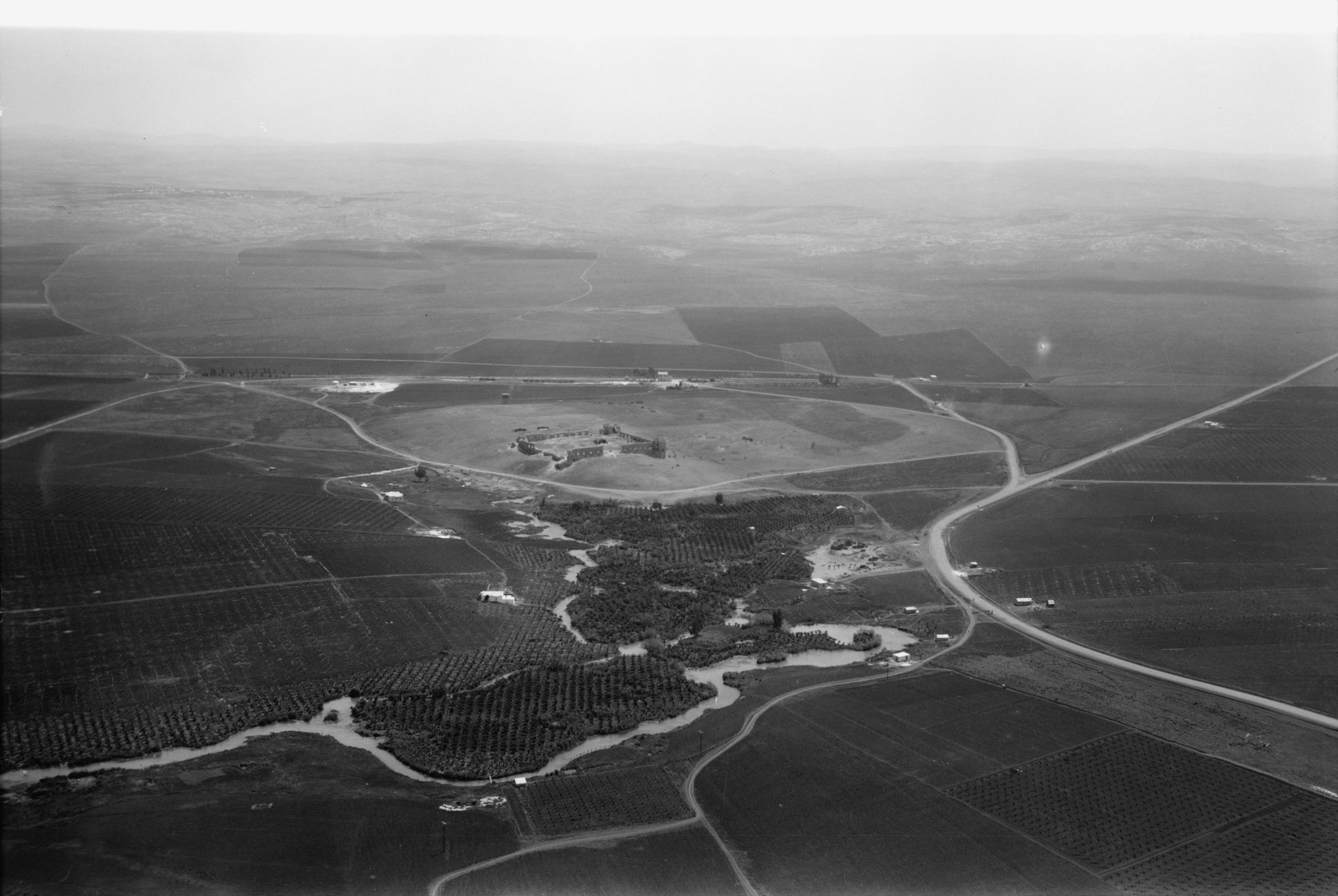
The Station and its surroundings from the air in 1932

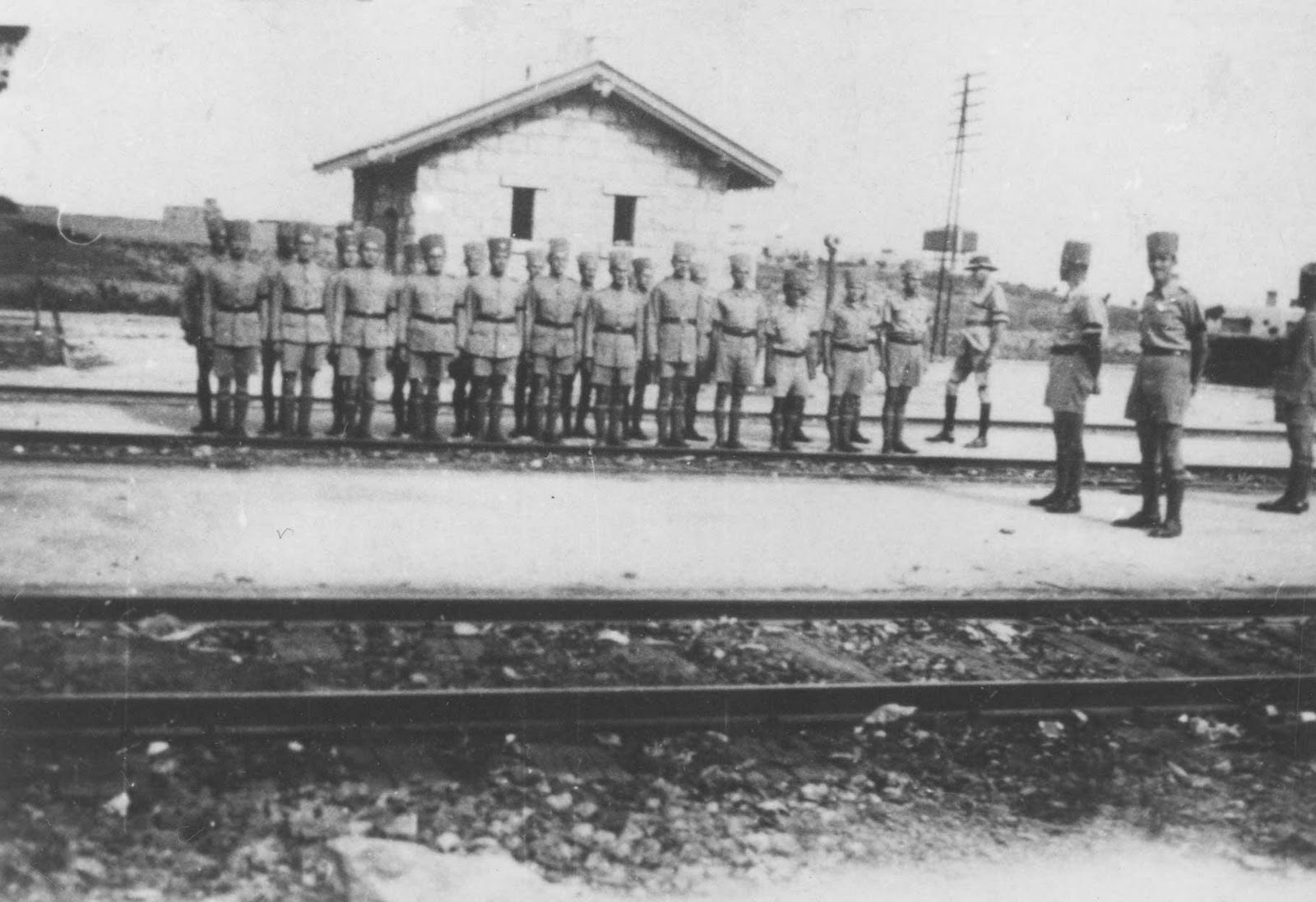
Ras el Ein (Rosh HaAyin South) railway station in the late 1930s

Rosh HaAyin–South railway station is a railway station near Rosh HaAyin, Israel. Despite the name, it is located north-west of the city, near the historic site of Antipatris (Tel Afek).

The station no longer serves passengers, but it remains operational as a freight terminal, and there are plans to reinstate the passenger service.

== History ==
Ras al-Ayn railway station was built in 1915 by the Ottoman authorities in Palestine as part of the Sinai and Palestine Campaign of World War I. To allow rapid deployment of their troops southward, the Turks built the Eastern Railway from Afula, where it connected to Jezreel Valley railway, southwards via Jenin and Tulkarm to Lydda, where it connected to the Jaffa–Jerusalem railway and the Railway to Beersheba. The line was built as narrow gauge (1050 mm) like the rest of the Ottoman railways in the region, and was situated relatively inland to avoid the reach of naval guns from Royal Navy warships patrolling the Mediterranean coast.

After the British conquered the area, they converted the Eastern Railway to standard gauge and extended it further northwards via Hadera, connecting Haifa with Lydda for onward journey west to Jaffa, east to Jerusalem, or south via Gaza City to El Kantara, Egypt. Thus, Ras al-Ayn railway station became part of the Palestine Railways main line. In 1921, a branch line was built from Ras al-Ayn station westwards to Petah Tikva.

During the 1936–1939 Arab revolt in Palestine, Jewish passengers on southbound main line trains alighted at Ras al-Ayn and changed onto buses, in order to avoid passing through Lod.

In 1946, Irgun militants bombed the station building, which at this time was mainly used by British troops stationed in the area. The city of Rosh HaAyin, founded in 1949, later became the main settlement served by the station, and so the station was renamed.

After the establishment of State of Israel, the branch line to Petah Tikva railway station, dubbed Yarkon Railway, was extended further westwards, reaching Tel Aviv North railway station in 1949, and later connected to the Coastal Railway in 1953.

When the passenger service on the Eastern Railway ceased in 1969, Rosh HaAyin railway station was closed. Yet, on 3 June 2000, the station reopened as the eastern terminus of the new Yarkon Railway passenger service between Tel Aviv and Rosh HaAyin. In 2003, this service was extended into Hod HaSharon, north of Rosh HaAyin; for this, a new connection between Yarkon Railway and Eastern Railway was built, allowing trains to turn north as well as south. The old Rosh HaAyin station, which was south of the junction between the two lines, could therefore not be served by the extended line, and the new Rosh HaAyin North railway station opened on 13 September 2003 at a location about 2 km north of the old one. Since then, Rosh HaAyin South railway station is only used by the freight services between the north of Israel and Lod, in order to bypass the congested Ayalon Railway.

== Future plans ==
The government of Israel announced plans to revive the Eastern Railway at a projected cost of NIS 8 billion (appx. US$ 2.2 billion), reinstating a service from Haifa via Hadera and Rosh HaAyin to Lod which would bypass the congested Coastal railway. The rebuilt Rosh HaAyin South railway station would be connected to the city with a footbridge over Highway 6. However, the construction is not expected to start before 2020.
