= Yarkon Railway =

Railway line in Israel

Coordinates: 32°6′39″N 34°52′47″E

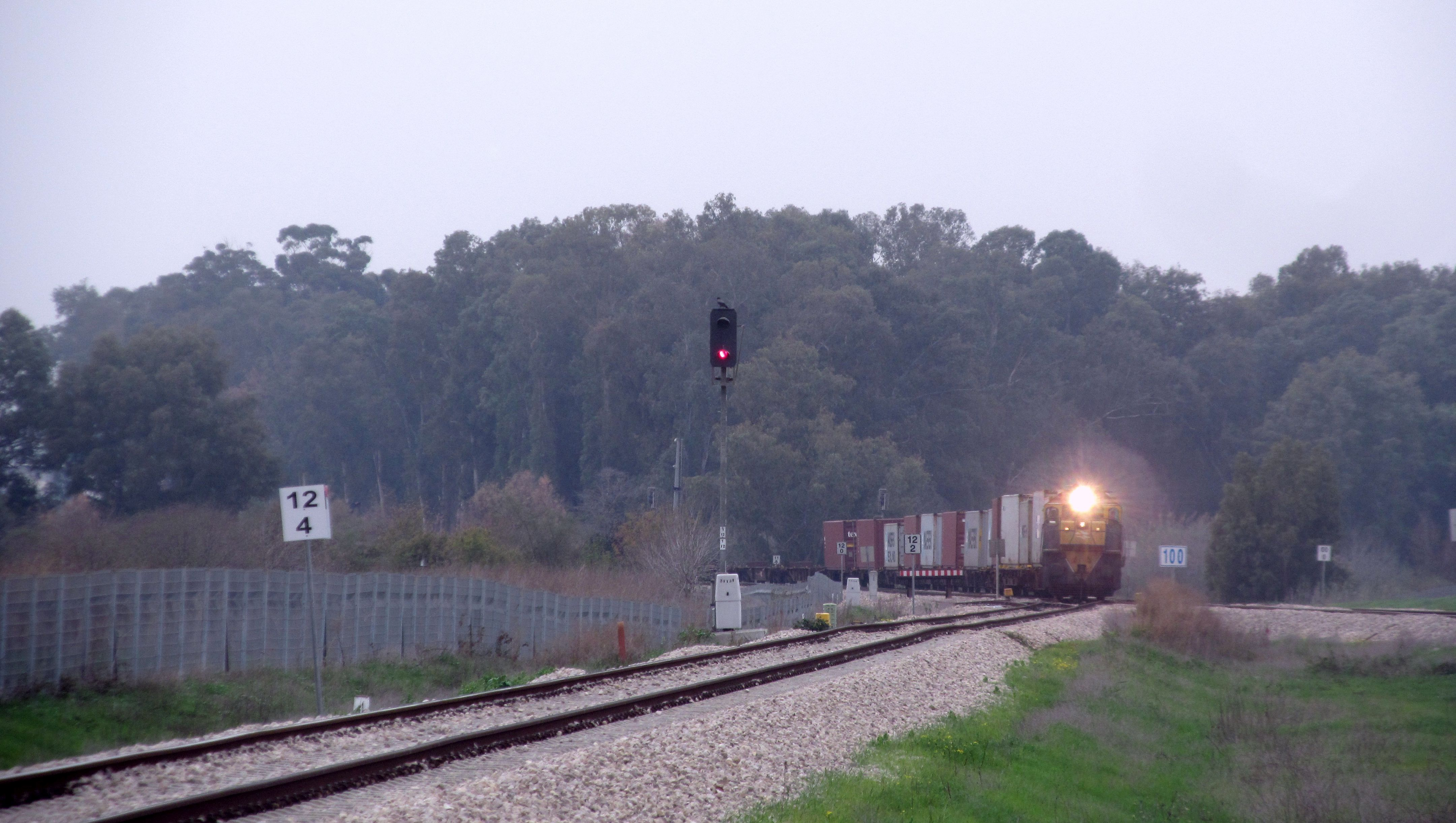
At the eastern end of Yarkon Railway, a freight train is turning towards Rosh HaAyin South

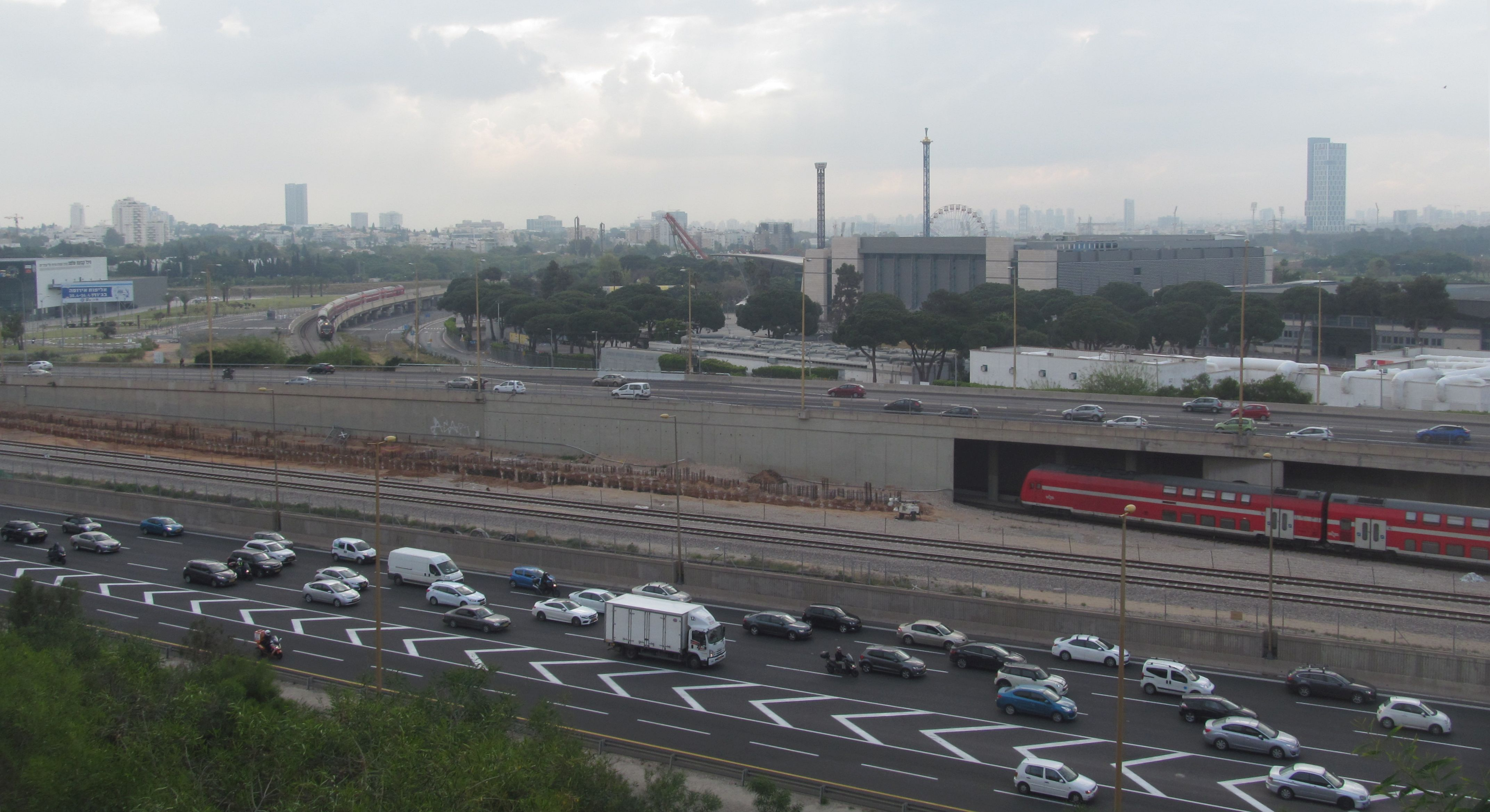
At its western end, Yarkon Railway branches off the Coastal railway near Tel Aviv University

The Yarkon Railway (Hebrew: מסילת הירקון, romanized: Mesilat HaYarkon) is a double-track railroad following the course of the Yarkon River in the central area of Israel. It is about 15 km long, stretching from the Coastal Railway to the Eastern Railway.

== History ==
The initial section of the Yarkon Railway was built in 1920–21 in response to a request from the Jewish settlers in Petah Tikva, who sought an improved means of transport for passengers and goods, mainly for shipping fruit picked from the citrus orchards around Petah Tikva to the ports of Jaffa (accessible via Lydda) or Haifa (accessible via Hadera) for export abroad. The branch line, splitting off the Eastern Railway at Rosh HaAyin South railway station and going westwards into Petah Tikva, was 50% financed and owned by the Petah-Tikva municipality, and always appeared separately in the accounts of Palestine Railways as "The Petah Tikva Railway". The passenger service to Petah Tikva started in 1922. Trains going from Petah Tikva to Hadera, or vice versa, had to reverse at Rosh HaAyin.

The original Petah Tikva railway station stood on the short HaAkhim Bakhar st., close to the central bus station; from there, the railway continued along the present Mivtza Yiftah st., then along the north side of Segula Cemetery, then along HaRakevet st. in the Segula Industrial Area.

After the establishment of the State of Israel, it was deemed necessary to connect Tel Aviv to the rail network. For this purpose, the Yarkon Railway was extended westwards into Bnei Brak, and a new station, named Tel Aviv North, opened on 20 September 1949, with through service to Haifa East railway station. The trains on this service still had to reverse at Rosh HaAyin. Petah Tikva railway station remained on a spur off the line between Bnei Brak and Rosh HaAyin, and consequently, this station was no longer served by passenger trains, although freight service continued.

In 1953, the last section of the Yarkon Railway opened for service, connecting it to the newly-constructed Coastal Railway south of Herzliya railway station. Shortly thereafter, the Coastal Railway was extended southwards to reach Tel Aviv proper; thus, the significance of Tel Aviv North railway station, situated far at the outskirts of the city, greatly diminished. Tel Aviv North was renamed Bnei Brak railway station following the 1954 opening of the Tel Aviv Central railway station (which is located at what was then the southern terminus of the Coastal Railway). In 1958, a westbound freight-only spur was built from the Yarkon railway into the Kiryat Arye industrial zone.

After service on the Eastern Railway between Hadera and Kfar Saba was discontinued in 1969, the Yarkon Railway became part of the national main line linking Haifa via Herzliya, Petah Tikva, Rosh HaAyin and Lod to Jerusalem and the south of Israel.

When the Ayalon Railway opened in the 1990s as a more direct connection between the Coastal Railway and Lod (running through Tel Aviv, unlike via the Yarkon and Eastern railways which bypassed the city), passenger service on the Yarkon Railway ceased completely. In 1999 it was decided to reinstate passenger service on the Yarkon railway in order to operate a new suburban line to the northern Gush Dan region; as a preparation for this, the old railway station in Petah Tikva and the spur line leading to it were dismantled, and the new Petah Tikva Segula railway station constructed instead. The new service between Tel Aviv and Rosh HaAyin opened on 3 June 2000. In 2003, this service was extended into Hod HaSharon via the Eastern Railway and the new Sharon Railway; for this, a new connection between the Yarkon Railway and Eastern Railway was built, which avoided the reversal at Rosh HaAyin. The old Rosh HaAyin South railway station thus remained inaccessible to the extended service, and the new Rosh HaAyin North railway station opened on 13 September 2003 at a location about 2 km north of the old one.

The newest station on the Yarkon Railway, Petah Tikva Kiryat Aryeh, opened on 3 May 2008. There are future plans to build a new railway station in the vicinity of Petah Tikva central bus station, to allow a convenient passenger connection to Tel Aviv Light Rail.

Between 2003 and 2012, the entirety of the Yarkon Railway was converted to double track. In 2021 the railway underwent electrification.
