= Eastern Railway =

Eastern Railway or Railroad may refer to:

- Eastern Railway (Western Australia)
- Eastern Railway (Austria), a railway line in Austria, initially operated by Austrian Eastern Railway
- Eastern Railway (India)
- Eastern Railway (Israel)
- Eastern Railway (Turkey), one of the predecessor railways to the Turkish State Railways
- Eastern Railroad, a former railroad company in New England that was a competitor, and later subsidiary, of the Boston and Maine Railroad
- Eastern Railroad (Pennsylvania), leased by the Monongahela Connecting Railroad
- Eastern Railroad of Long Island
- Eastern National Railway (Austria), a former railway company in the Austrian Empire and Austria-Hungary
- Austrian Eastern Railway, a former railway company in the Austrian Empire and Austria-Hungary
- Bavarian Eastern Railway Company, a former railway company in Bavaria, Germany
- Bosnian Eastern Railway, a former network of narrow-gauge railway lines in Bosnia and Herzegovina
- Chinese Eastern Railway, a formerly Russian railway line in China
- Prussian Eastern Railway, a railway line in Prussia, part of the former German Empire
- Württemberg Eastern Railway, a railway line in Württemberg, Germany

== See also ==
- Eastern Line (disambiguation)
- East Line (disambiguation)
- Ostbahn (disambiguation)
- Østbanen (disambiguation)
