= Bnei Brak–Ramat HaHayal railway station =

Railway station in Israel

Bnei Brak–Ramat HaHayal בני ברק – רמת החייל
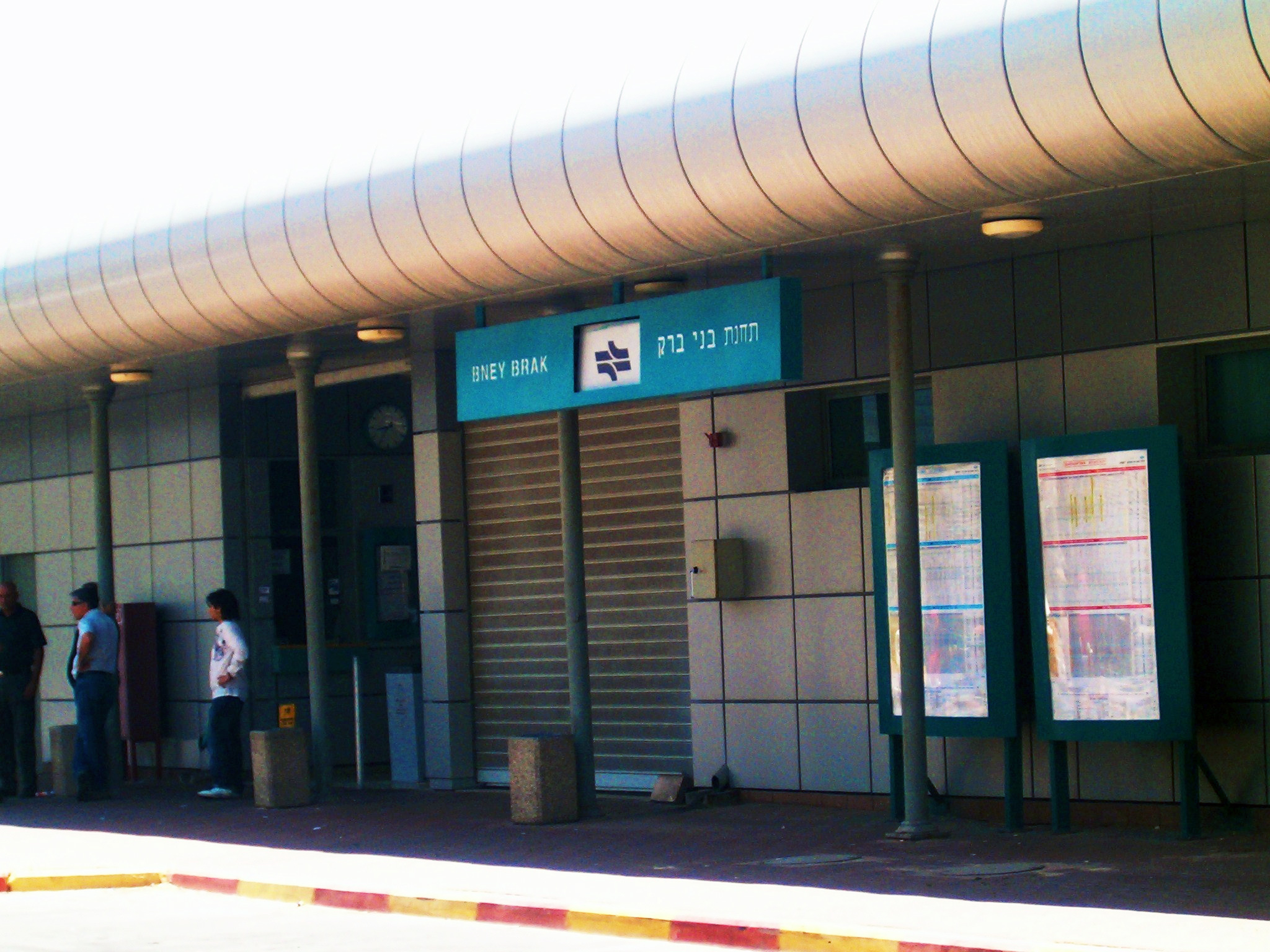

General information
- Location: Mivtza Kadesh St. 1, Bnei Brak, Israel
- Coordinates: 32.1029°N 34.8310°E
- Line: Yarkon Railway
- Platforms: 2
- Tracks: 3

Construction
- Structure type: At-grade

History
- Opened: 20 September 1949; 76 years ago
- Closed: 1990s
- Rebuilt: 2000
- Electrified: 25 December 2021; 4 years ago
- Former names: 1949–1954: Tel Aviv haTzafon; 1954–2016: Bnei Braq

Passengers
- 2019: 1,271,141
- Rank: 34 out of 68
Location

Bnei Brak–Ramat HaHayal railway station is a suburban passenger railway station in Israel, operated by Israel Railways. It is located on the Yarkon Railway near the Bnei Brak–Ramat Gan and Bnei Brak–Tel Aviv borders next to the Ayalon Mall and Ramat Gan Stadium. In spite of its proximity to important industrial and commercial areas of Gush Dan as well as to residential areas of Tel Aviv, Bnei Brak is one of the less-popular stations of Israel Railways, possibly because of its misleading name and lack of awareness. As a result, in an effort to increase the public's awareness of the station, the name of the Ramat HaHayal neighborhood located to the north of the station was added to the station's name in 2016.

The station is located approximately 200 meters from the three-borders point between Bnei Brak, Tel Aviv and Ramat Gan, which is situated near the bridge of Mivtza Kadesh Street over the Yarkon River.

== History ==
=== Tel Aviv North station ===
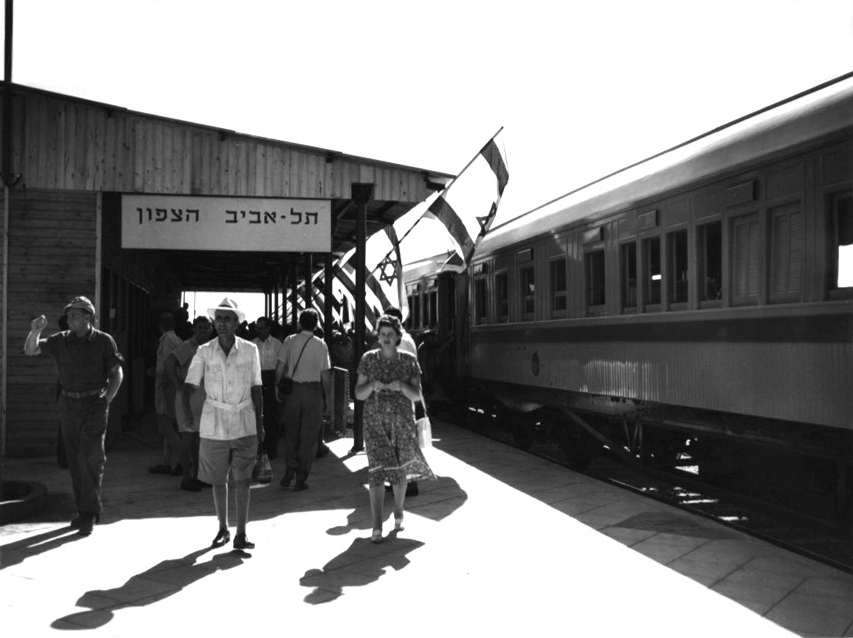
Tel Aviv North railway station in 1949

The station was originally opened on September 20, 1949, for the purpose of serving the residents of Tel Aviv, and named Tel Aviv North. At that time, neither the Coastal railway nor the Ayalon railway existed, the only station serving Tel Aviv was Tel Aviv South, and the only connection from Haifa and the north of Israel to the south was through the Eastern Railway, which did not include a connection to Tel Aviv. The closest such connection was the Petah Tikva railway station, which lay at the end of a short westbound spur off the Eastern railway. In 1949, Israel Railways decided to lengthen this railroad branch further to the west, and thus created this station.

With the opening of the Coastal railway in May 1953, the Tel Aviv North branch was further lengthened westward to connect with it and the station became more relevant and served as an interim stop on the Haifa–Jerusalem service using the new Coastal Railway. This was enabled since the route through the station could connect to the Jaffa–Jerusalem railway by bypassing central Gush Dan through Tel Aviv North and from there to the Eastern railway via Rosh HaAyin and Lod.

=== Decline in importance ===
With the opening of Tel Aviv Center in November 1954 by extending the Coastal railway further into Tel Aviv, the station's relevance was again put into question and its name was changed to Bnei Brak, with only a few trains on the Haifa–Jerusalem service continuing to use it. After the full opening of the Ayalon railway in the 1990s that connected the Coastal railway with the Jaffa–Jerusalem railway via the Ayalon Highway in heart of the Tel Aviv region, passenger service on the branch to Bnei Brak and Petah Tikva was abandoned entirely.

=== Resurgence as a suburban rail station ===
On June 3, 2000, a new suburban service was initiated by Israel Railways, going from Tel Aviv to the Rosh HaAyin South railway station. The Bnei Brak station became part of this line and opened later the same year. The station remained a stop on the route when a few years later, Rosh HaAyin South station was closed and the suburban line's terminus was changed to Kfar Sava via the new Rosh HaAyin North railway station.

== Structure ==
The passenger station has three platforms—one adjacent to the entrance, and two on an island between two rail tracks.

The station complex also includes a freight terminal and a large rail yard as well as now mostly-disused industrial sidings to warehouses and factories adjacent to the site.

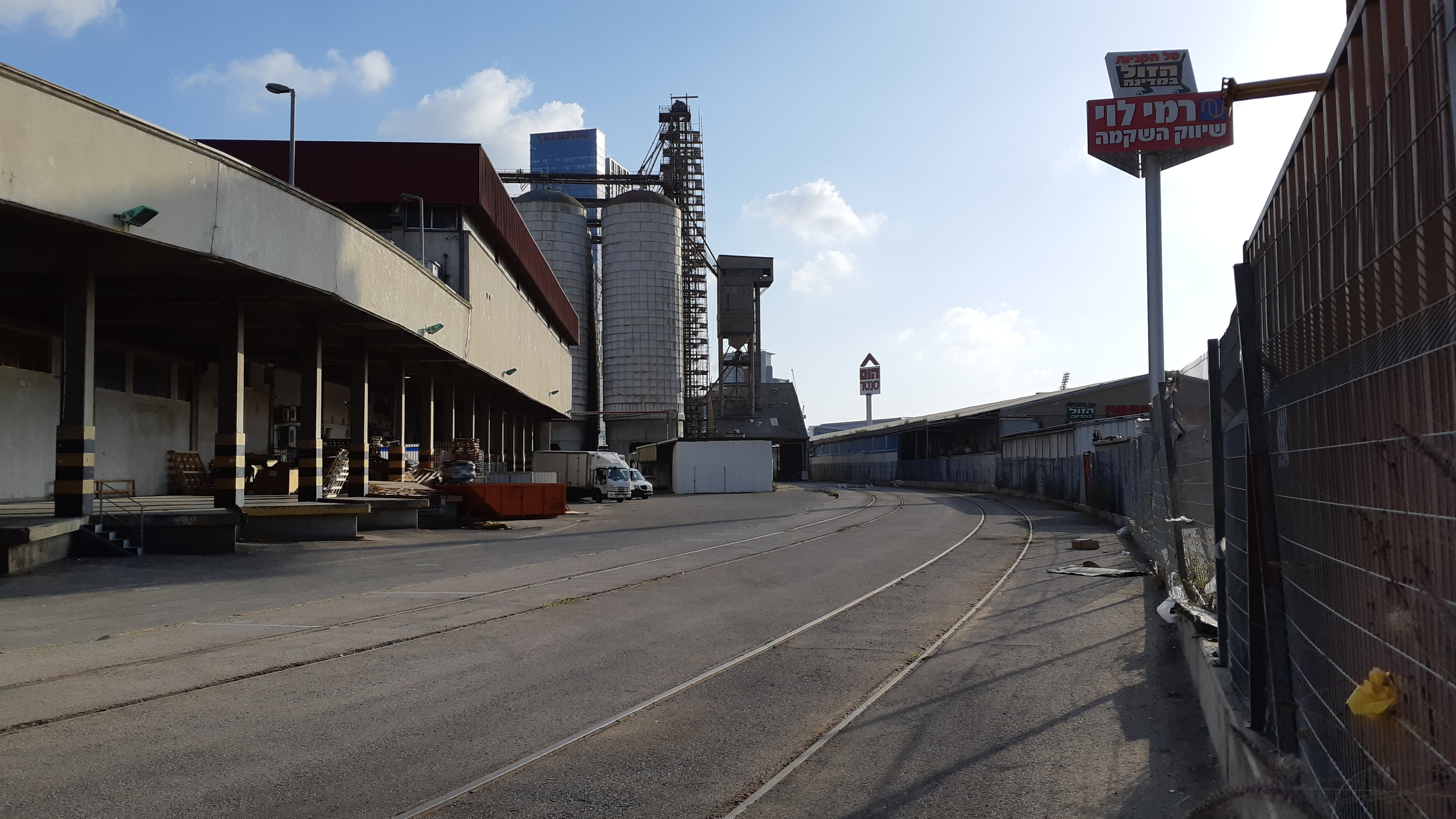
Industrial spur to Ramid Silo in Bney Brak rail yard

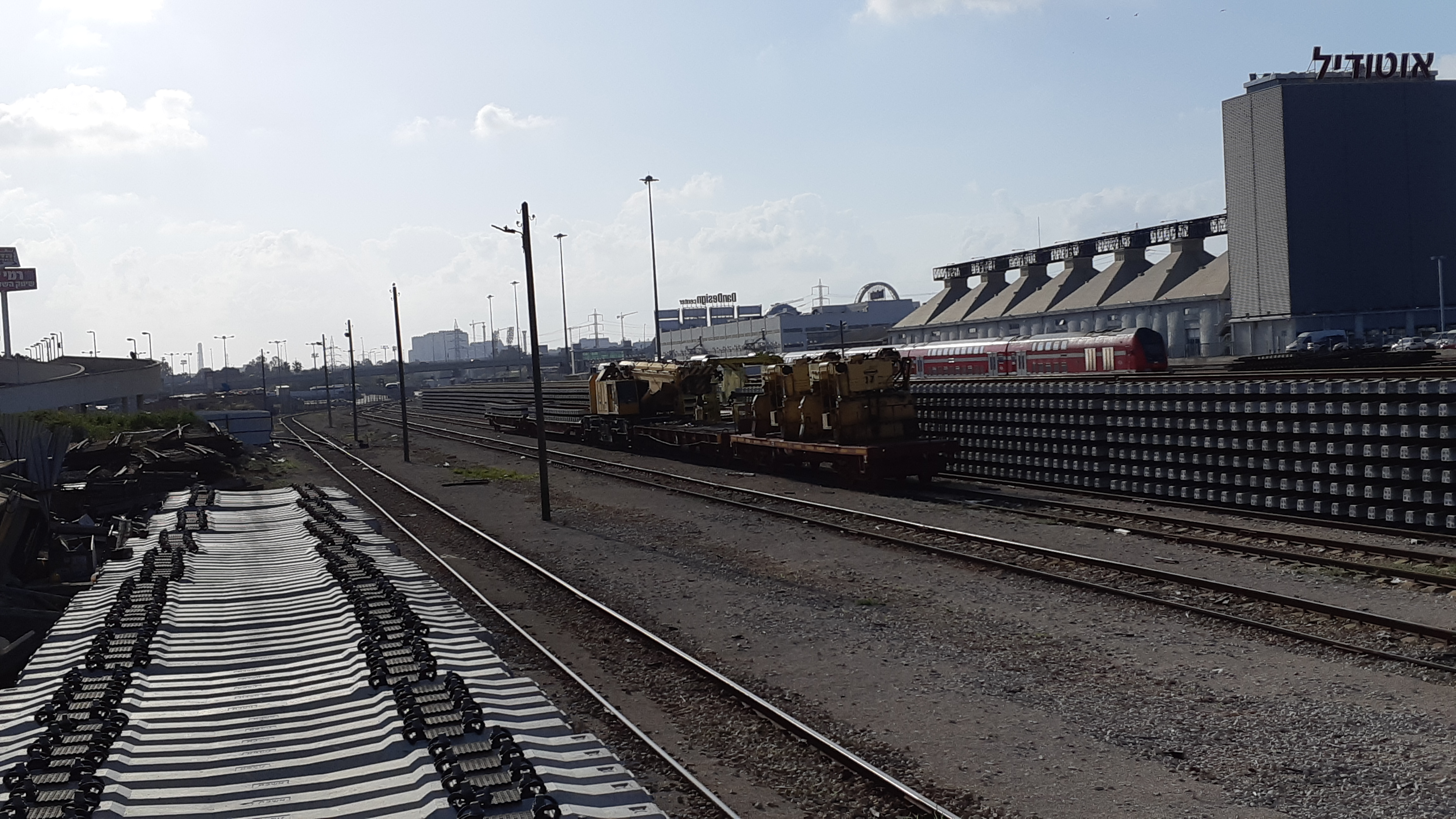
Bney Brak rail yard, the view from the east

== Access ==
Despite its name, Bnei Brak station is close to many northeastern neighborhoods of Tel Aviv, as well as the Bnei Brak industrial zone, and is relatively easily accessible by public transport from Ramat HaSharon. Northeastern Tel Aviv (Ever HaYarkon neighborhoods) is accessible by bus service operated by Dan Bus Company, namely the circular line 81, connecting Ramat HaHayal directly with the station. The station is also a walking distance from the Ramat HaHayal business and leisure zone in Tel Aviv.

The access to the station is from Lehi Street, a cul-de-sac connected to Mivtza Kadesh Street, which divides Bnei Brak and Ramat Gan. Several bus lines travel along Mivtza Kadesh Street and stop near the station's entrance. Most of the lines to Tel Aviv, Ramat Gan and Bnei Brak are operated by Dan, but lines 524, 525 and 531 to Ramat HaSharon and Herzliya are Metropoline lines, and line 137 to Yehud via Kiryat Ono is operated by Metropoline. A Dan bus terminal located near Ayalon Mall offers additional connections to Ramat Gan and Giv'atayim.

== Train service ==
Preceding station	Israel Railways	Following station
Petah Tikva–Kiryat Aryeh towards Herzliya	Herzliya–Ashkelon	Tel Aviv–University towards Ashkelon

== Ridership ==
Passengers boarding and disembarking by year
Year	Passengers	Rank	Source
2021	282,841 (▼37,979)	47 of 66 (▼8)	2021 Freedom of Information Law Annual Report
2020	320,820 (▼950,321)	39 of 68 (▼5)	2020 Freedom of Information Law Annual Report
2019	1,271,141	34 of 68	2019 Freedom of Information Law Annual Report
