= Ramat Gan Stadium =

Football stadium in the Tel Aviv District, Israel

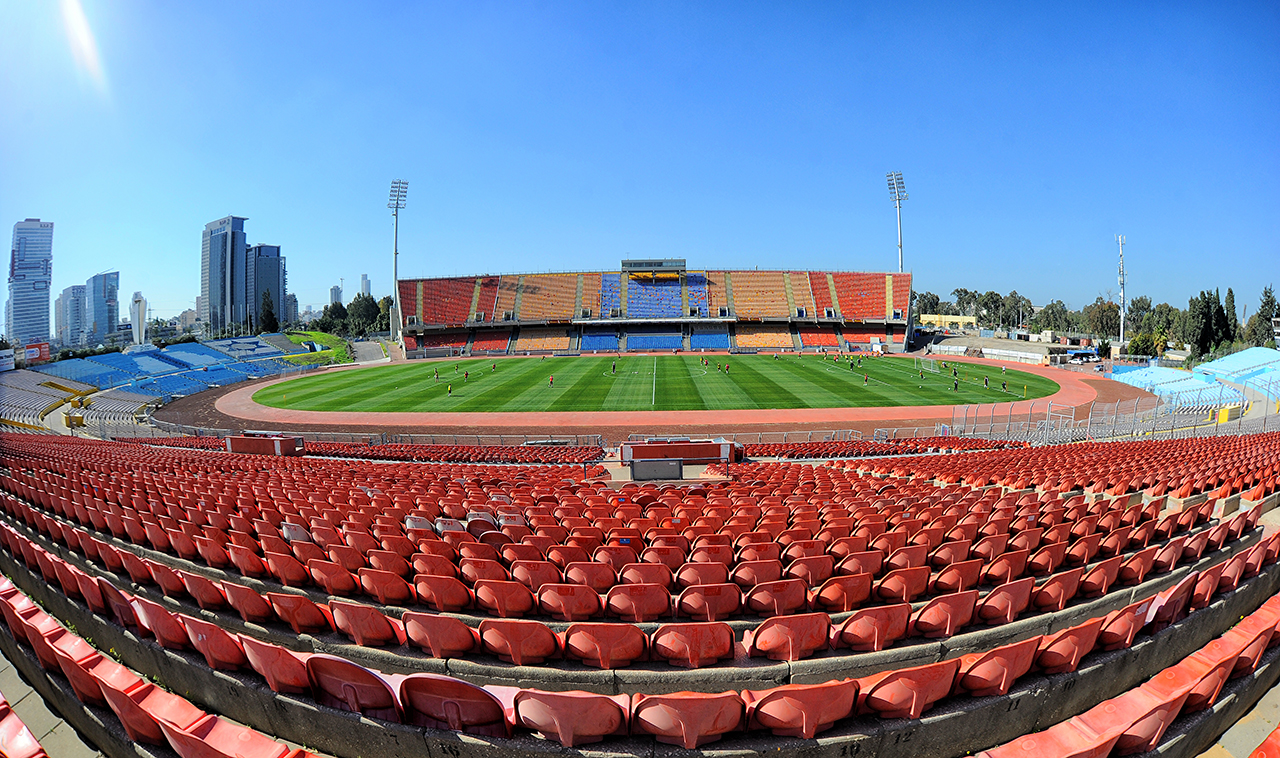
- Ramat Gan Stadium at 2014
- Interactive map of Ramat Gan Stadium
- Former names: The National Stadium (1954-2014)
- Location: Ramat Gan, Tel Aviv District, Israel
- Coordinates: 32°6′1″N 34°49′27″E
- Owner: Israel Football Association
- Capacity: 13,370 (permitted seats)
- Surface: Grass
- Field size: 105 × 68 m (115 × 74 yd)
- Public transit: at Ben-Gurion; Yarkon Railway Line at Bnei Brak

Construction
- Built: 1950
- Opened: 1950
- Renovated: 1984, 1993
- Expanded: 1982
- Cost: IL400,000
- Architect: Ivor Shaw Friba

Tenants
- Israel national football team (1956–2013); Maccabi Tel Aviv (1985-1986, 1987-1995, 1996-2000); Hapoel Ramat Gan Givatayim (2015–present): Major sporting events hosted; 1964 AFC Asian Cup Maccabiah Games (1950–1997, 2005, 2009)

Ramat Gan Stadium (Hebrew: אצטדיון רמת גן, Itztadion Ramat Gan) is a football stadium in the Tel Aviv District city of Ramat Gan, Israel. It served as the national stadium of Israel national football team until 2014.

== Overview ==
Completed in 1951 and serving as Israel's largest stadium ever since, the all-seated Ramat Gan Stadium contains 41,583 seats, 13,370 of which are located in the Western Tribune, completed during a major refurbishment in 1982.

The Ramat Gan Stadium is mixed-use, fit for athletic competitions alongside its more regular usage as a football stadium. It hosts Israeli international football matches, and has hosted the home UEFA Champions League matches of Maccabi Tel Aviv and Maccabi Haifa in the 2004–05 and 2009–10 seasons, respectively. The pitch dimensions are 105 m × 68 m (115 × 74 yd), with a 10,500 m^{2} (2.6 acres) lawn. The stadium's plot area is 36,000 m^{2} (8.9 acres).

The Ramat Gan Stadium contains six dressing rooms, meeting halls, a conference center, press rooms, a referees' room and medical and drug-test clinics. It is sided by two training fields, large athletes clinic, a café-restaurant, and a 3,900 space open-air car park. It also houses the headquarters of the Israel Football Association.

The world-class artificial lighting in the Ramat Gan Stadium provides up to 1,550 lux on the entire the pitch. Until the opening of Sammy Ofer Stadium in Haifa, it was the only world-class stadium in Israel and the only Israeli stadium to host official FIFA World Cup Qualifiers and UEFA Champions League games, although Hapoel Tel Aviv got permission to stage their 2010 Champions League games at the Bloomfield Stadium. Until 2013, the stadium was also the location for opening ceremonies of the Maccabiah Games; since 2013, opening ceremonies have taken place in Teddy Stadium, Jerusalem. With the more modern Sammy Ofer Stadium and Teddy Stadium replacing the Ramat Gan Stadium as alternative home venues for the Israel National Football Team, as of 2018 the stadium remains largely abandoned as a venue for football games.

According to IFA former president Avi Luzon, there are plans to tear down the Ramat Gan Stadium and rebuild a larger one with expected capacity of 55,000 people. But by the end of 2016 it was not established.

== Entertainment ==
The stadium has hosted musical acts such as Depeche Mode, Elton John, R.E.M., Yeah Yeah Yeahs, Leonard Cohen, Sting, High on Fire, Orphaned Land, Metallica, Simon and Garfunkel, Bob Dylan and Kanye West. In 2012, Madonna opened the MDNA Tour at the stadium, playing in front of a sold-out crowd of more than 33,000 people.

== Gallery ==
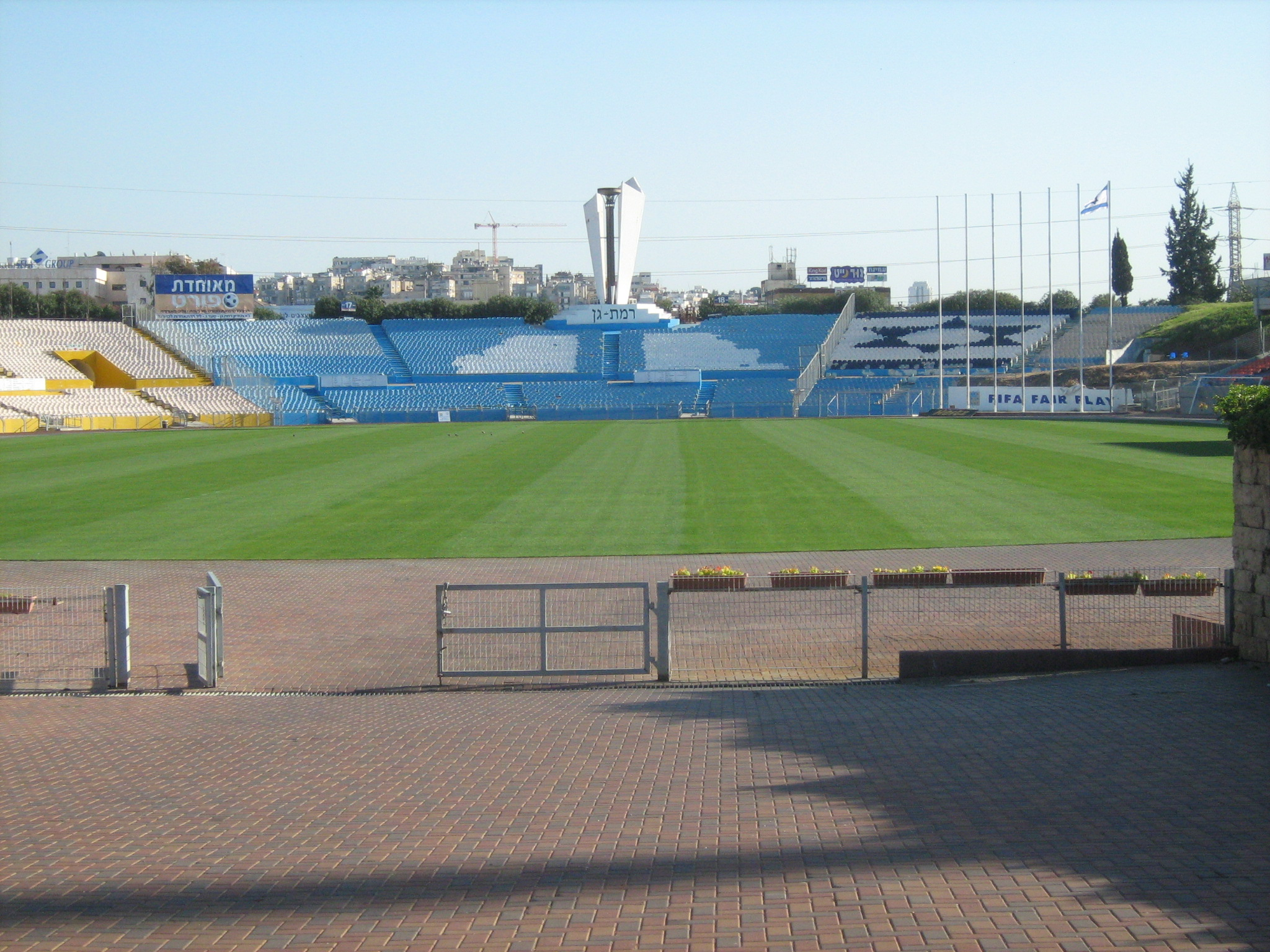

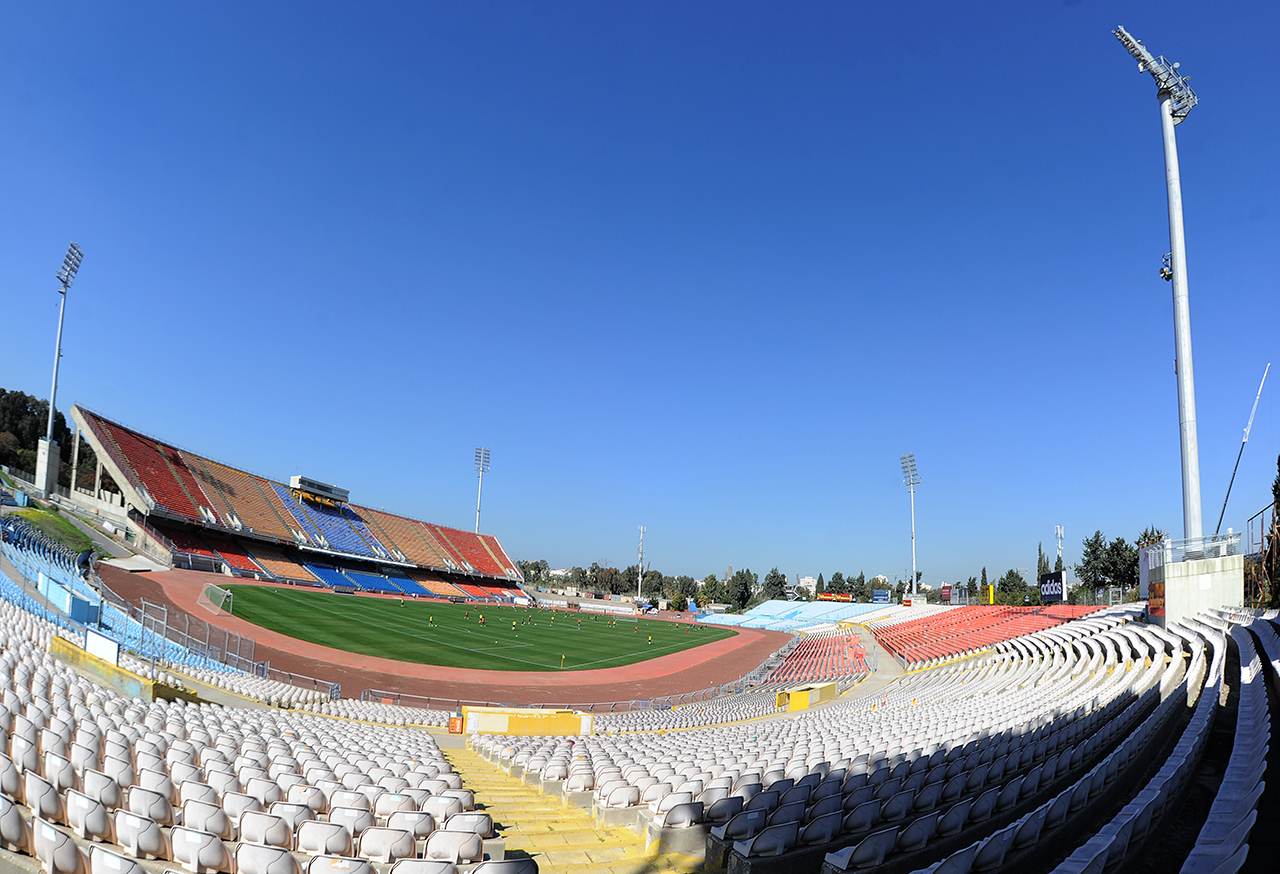

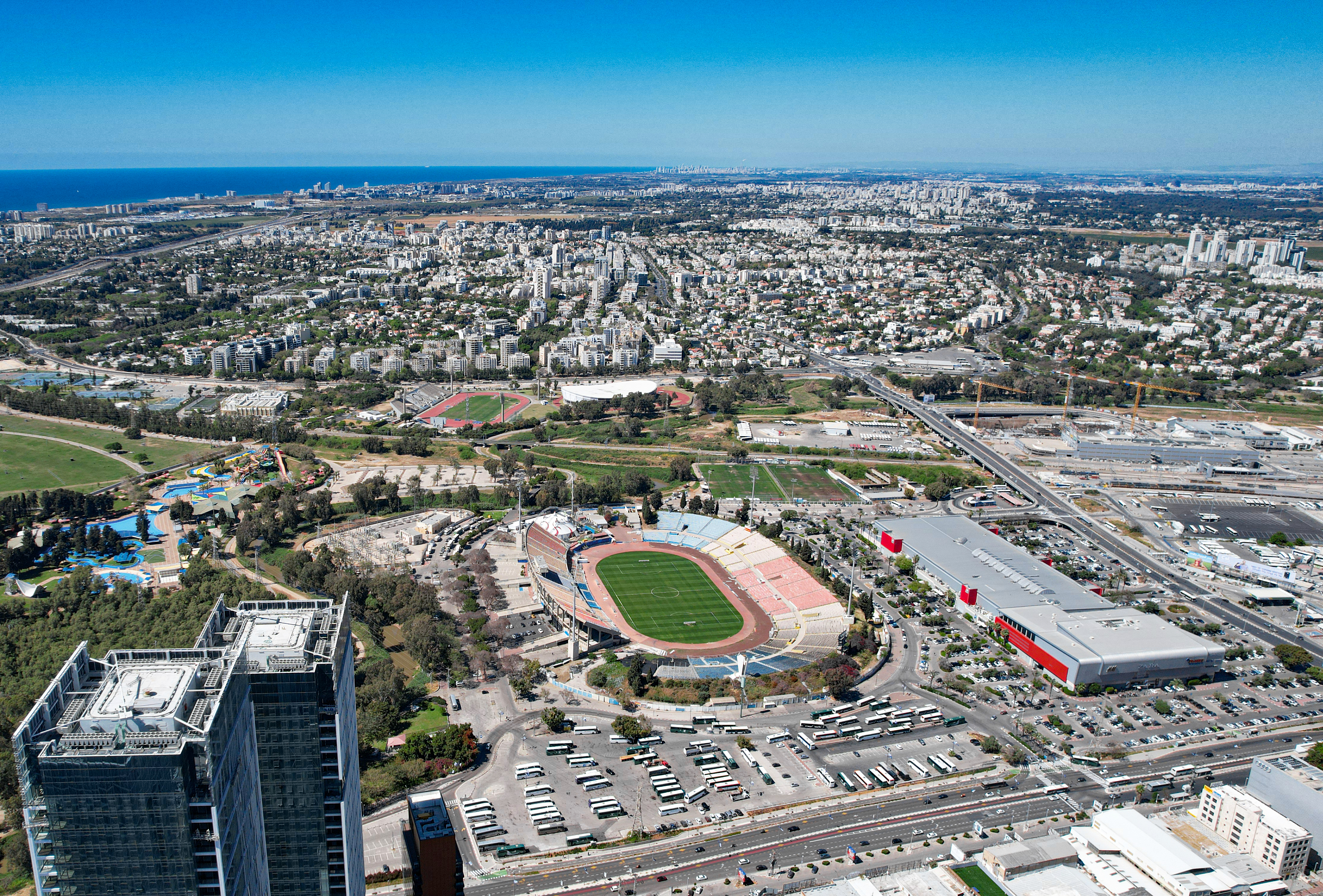

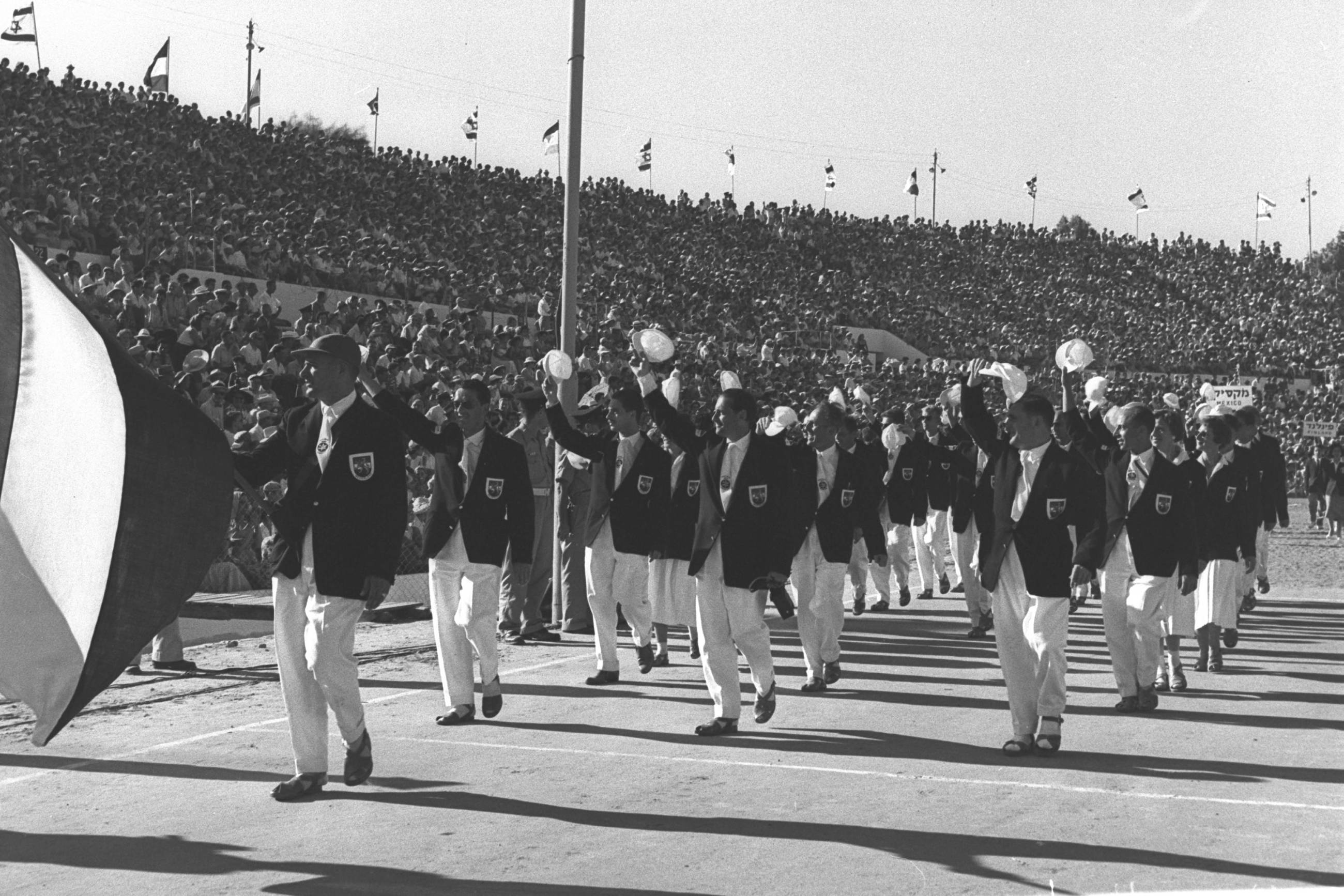

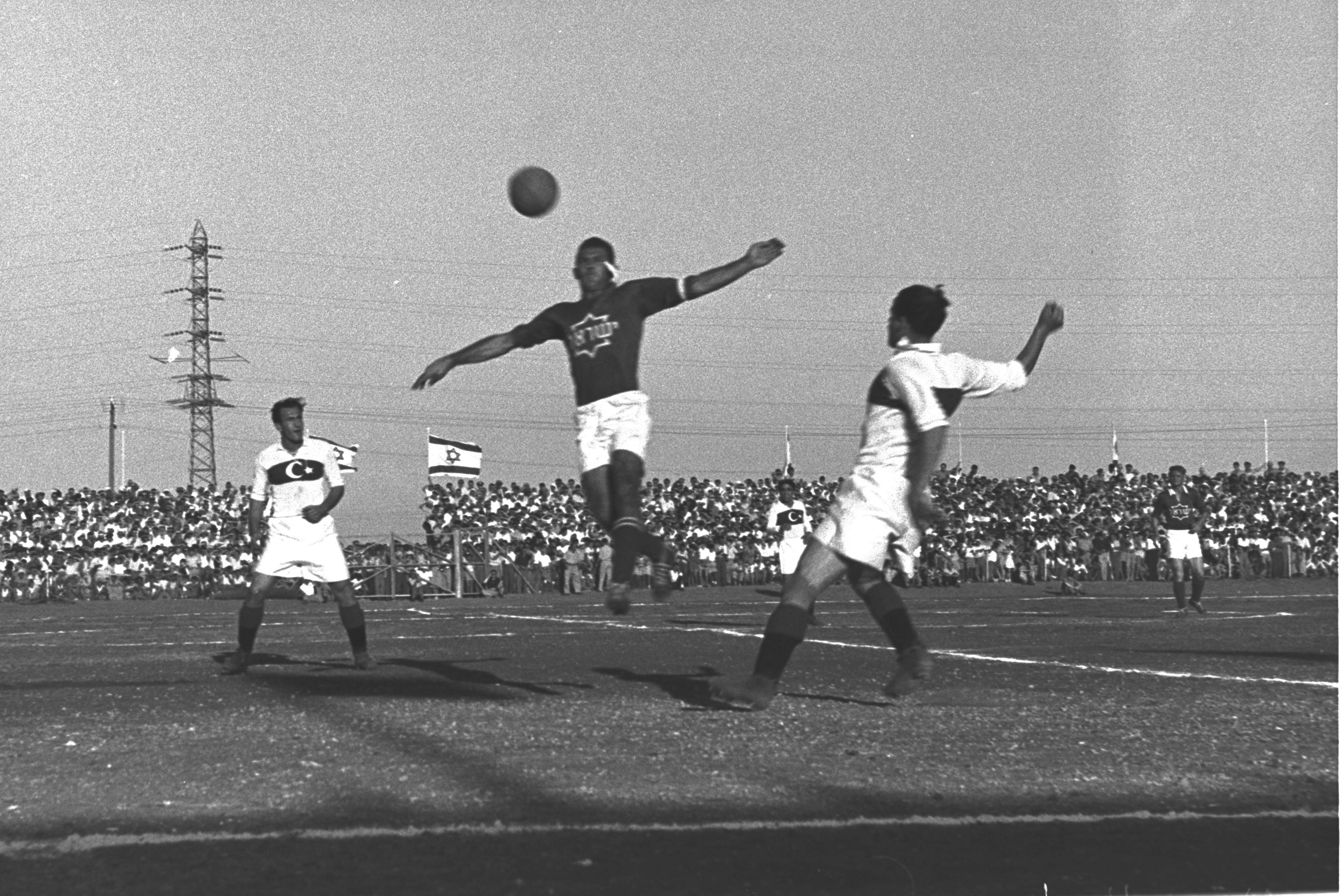

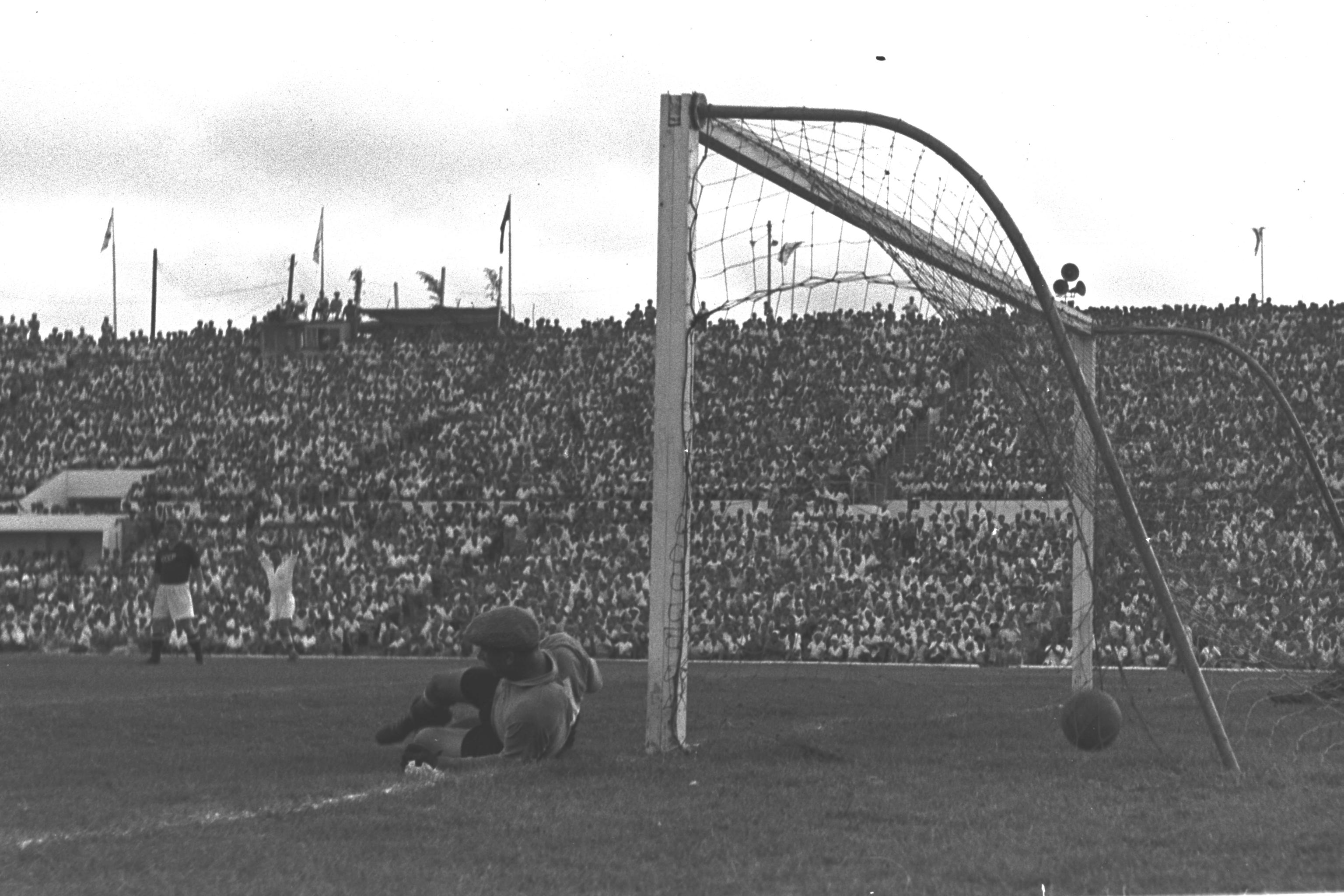

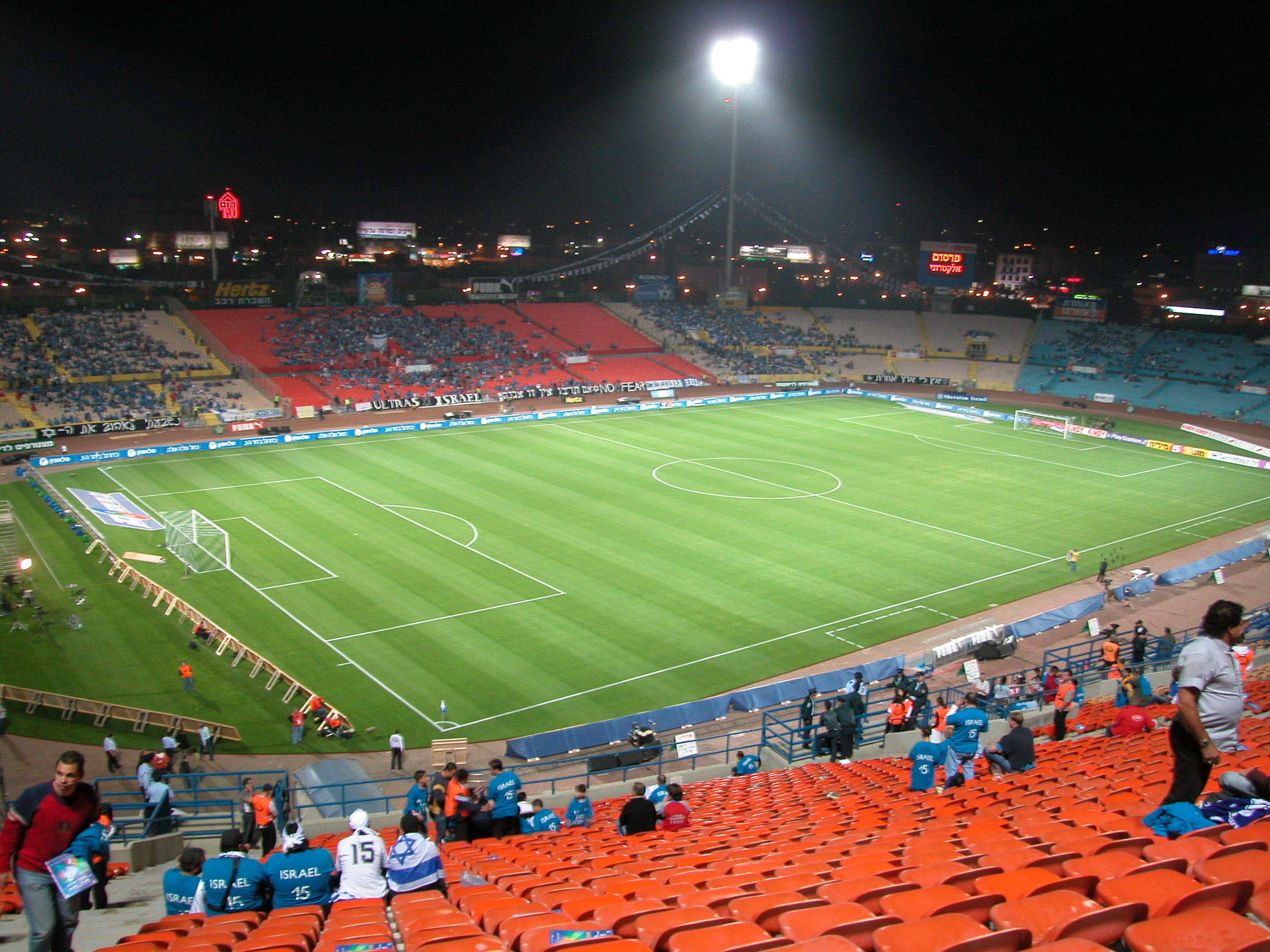

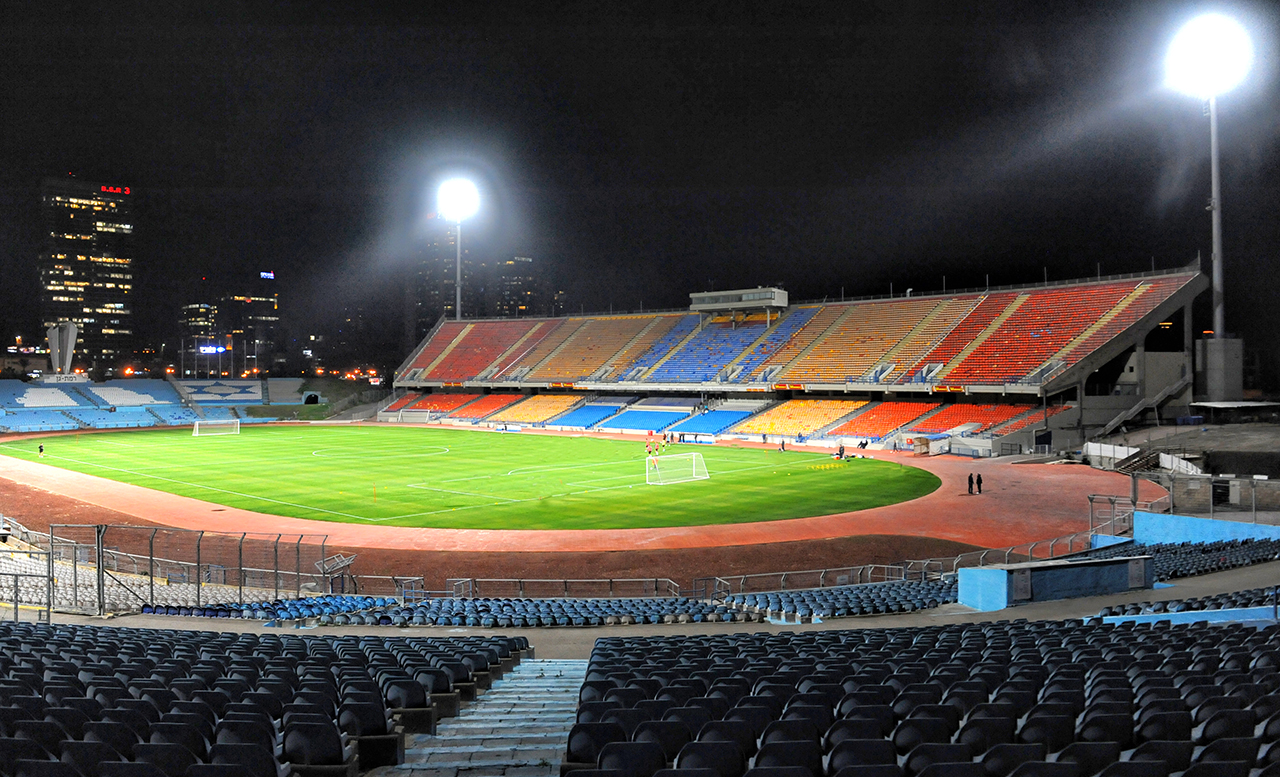

Preceded by Dongdaemun Stadium (South Korea) Seoul	AFC Asian Cup; Host Venue; 1964	Succeeded by Amjadieh Stadium (Iran) Tehran
