= Ostbahn =

Ostbahn (German: Eastern Railway) may refer to:

- Austrian Eastern Railway (Ostbahn), a former railway company in the Austrian Empire and Austria-Hungary
- Eastern Railway (Austria) (Austrian Ostbahn), a railway line in Austria, initially operated by Austrian Eastern Railway
- Bavarian Eastern Railway Company (Bavarian Ostbahn), a former railway company in Bavaria, Germany
- Prussian Eastern Railway (Prussian Ostbahn), a railway line in Prussia, part of the former German Empire
- Württemberg Eastern Railway (Württemberg Ostbahn), a railway line in Württemberg, Germany
- SC Ostbahn XI, an association football club based in Vienna, Austria
- Ostbahn (General Government), German railway administration in occupied Poland during World War II

== See also ==
- Eastern Railway (disambiguation)
- Østbanen (disambiguation)
