= Hadera–East railway station =

Railway station in Israel

Hadera–East חדרה – מזרח
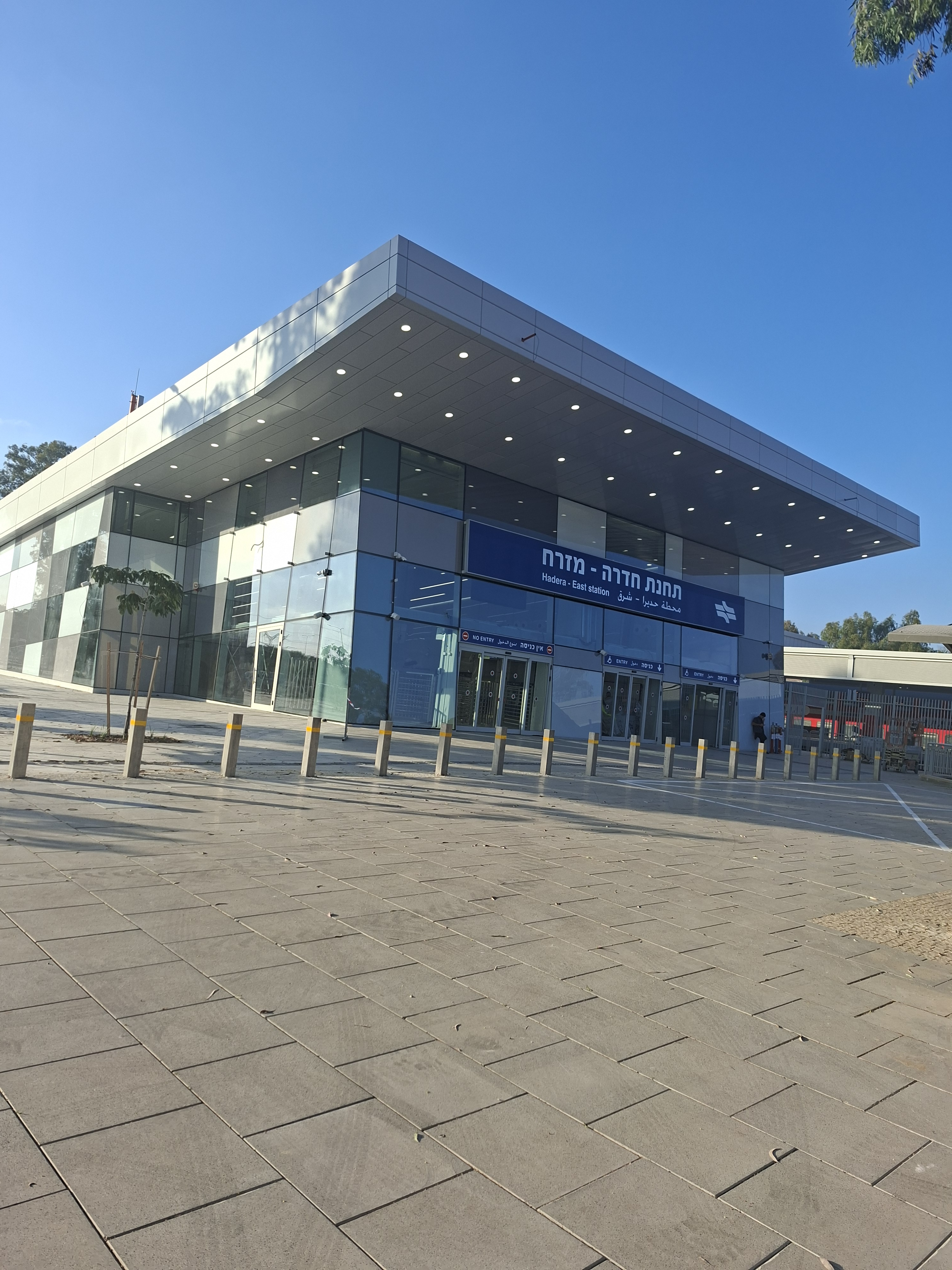
- The entrance of the revived Hadera East station on its opening day in 2026.

General information
- Location: Tzahal Street, Hadera
- Coordinates: 32°26′46″N 34°57′00″E
- Owner: Israel Railways
- Line: Eastern Railway
- Platforms: 1 (original station); 4 (revived station)
- Tracks: 2 (original station); 5 (revived station)

History
- Opened: 1920
- Closed: 1968
- Rebuilt: 28 June 2026
Location

Hadera–East railway station is a railway station in Hadera, Israel. It originally served as the northern terminus of the Eastern Railway. In 1968, the line was closed to passengers and the railway south of the station to Kfar Saba was abandoned. A short section of the Eastern Railway connecting the station north to the Coastal railway line was left in operation—being used by freight trains serving the Granot "Ambar North" large feed mill complex near Gan Shmuel that is located adjacent to Hadera East station.

Starting in 2022, the station underwent extensive construction and restoration in anticipation of being reopened in the late 2020s as part of the re-building effort of the Eastern Railway. On June 28, 2026, the station officially reopened completely rebuilt offering train services to Rosh HaAyin–North via Tayibe and Tira.

== History ==
During the Sinai and Palestine Campaign of World War I, the Ottoman authorities in Palestine constructed the railway between the Jezreel Valley railway in Afula southwards via Jenin and Tulkarm to Lydda, where it connected to the Jaffa–Jerusalem railway and the Railway to Beersheba. The northwards extension from Tulkarm to Hadera allowed transporting timber from the forests around Hadera that was used as fuel and for infrastructure. The line was built as narrow gauge (1050 mm) like the rest of the Ottoman railways in the region, and was situated relatively inland to avoid the reach of naval guns from Royal Navy warships patrolling the Mediterranean coast. In the forests of Hadera, the Ottoman railway split into two branches, one ending about 1.6 km south-west from Hadera, the other about 2.5 km north from Karkur; neither of these branches served any settlement, although they provided a link with the military bases that developed around Hadera.

The station building in 1946

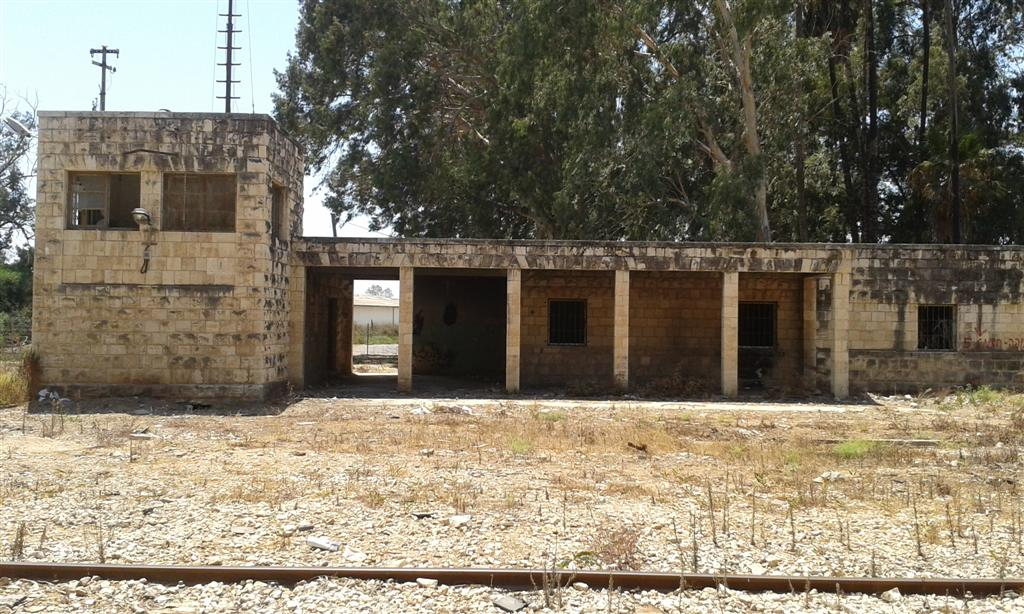
The remains of the British station building in 2015 before undergoing restoration in 2020.

After the British conquered the area, they converted the Eastern Railway to standard gauge and extended it further northwards, connecting Haifa with Lydda for onward journey west to Jaffa, east to Jerusalem, or south via Gaza City to El Kantara, Egypt. Prior to the construction of this new line, the only southbound connection from Haifa was the Jezreel Valley railway via Afula. Hadera East halt was constructed by Palestine Railways as part of this new line; it opened in 1920 at a location 2.5 km north-east from the town, and was served by buses from Hadera, Pardes Hanna and Karkur. Until the 1940s, the halt didn't include any facilities for waiting passengers, not even a canopy.

The Tehran Children — a group of 1,230 Jewish refugees from Poland, mostly children, who escaped in 1939 to the USSR, then in 1942 to Iran, then brought by the Jewish Agency for Israel by sea to Suez, and from there on a train to the Yishuv — stopped at Hadera East station on 18 February 1943, and a festive greeting was arranged for the children.

The new Coastal railway line was constructed during the early 1950s, and shortened the rail journey between Haifa and Tel Aviv from 1 hour and 20 minutes to just over 1 hour. The new railway line diverged from the old one at the Remez railway junction near Pardes Hanna, about 2.5 km north of Hadera East, which meant that Hadera East could not be served by the new passenger service between Haifa and Tel Aviv. In order for the new passenger service to include Hadera, the new Hadera West railway station, built 5 km south of Remez junction and 5 km west of the old railway station, opened to passengers in 1957. Nevertheless, some passenger and freight service via Hadera East continued until 1968, when the passenger service between Haifa and Jerusalem ended, the station closed, the railway track south of it abandoned and was later mostly dismantled.

== Revival of the station ==
The government of Israel announced plans to revive the Eastern Railway at a projected cost of NIS 10 billion (appx. US$ 2.7 billion in 2018 dollars), reinstating a service from Haifa via Hadera and Kfar Saba to Lod which would bypass the congested Coastal railway south of Pardes Hanna. Out of the projected amount, NIS 50 million would fund the creation of a new Hadera East station, which will be situated within the site in a location that allows for the preservation of the historic British buildings. As part of the project, extensive restoration of some of the station's historic buildings began in early 2020. On June 28th, 2026, this project eventually came to reality with the reopening of the station, offering currently train services to Rosh HaAyin-North
