= Eastern Line =

Eastern Line may refer to:

== Railways ==
- Eastern Line (Auckland), a suburban rail service in Auckland, New Zealand
- Eastern line (Kolkata Suburban Railway), in West Bengal, India
- Eastern Line (Thailand), a railway line in Thailand
- Eastern Østfold Line, in Norway
- IRT Eastern Parkway Line, a New York City Subway line in Brooklyn, New York, United States
- T4 Eastern Suburbs & Illawarra Line, a commuter railway service in Sydney, Australia
  - Eastern Suburbs railway line, a branch of the Eastern Suburbs & Illawarra Line
- Eastern Trunk line, in Taiwan
- BMT Canarsie Line, a rapid transit line in Brooklyn, New York, United States, sometimes referred to as the 14th Street–Eastern Line
- Chinese Eastern Railway, a railway network centred on Harbin, China
- Great Eastern Main Line, in England, United Kingdom, sometimes referred to as the East Anglia Main Line
- South Eastern Main Line, in England, United Kingdom

== Other ==
- Eastern Steamship Lines, a former shipping company in the United States

== See also ==
- East Line (disambiguation)
- Eastern Railway (disambiguation)
