= Petah Tikva–Kiryat Aryeh railway station =

Railway station in Israel

Petah Tikva–Kiryat Aryeh פתח תקווה – קרית אריה
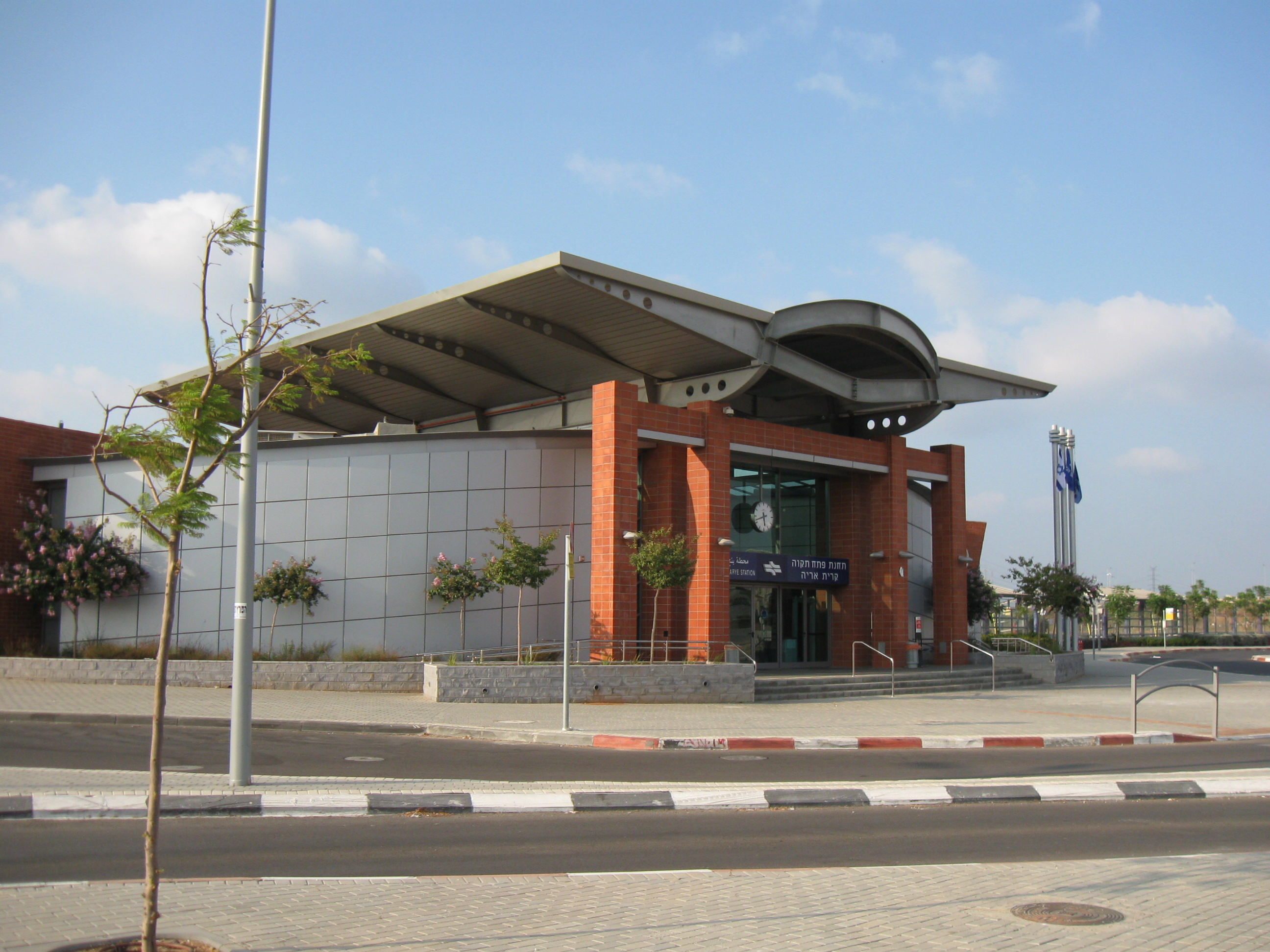

General information
- Location: Em HaMoshavot Rd., Petah Tikva, Israel
- Coordinates: 32°6′22.34″N 34°51′46.53″E
- Line: Yarkon Railway
- Platforms: 2
- Tracks: 2

Construction
- Accessible: Yes

History
- Opened: 3 May 2008; 18 years ago
- Electrified: 25 December 2021; 4 years ago

Passengers
- 2019: 1,943,818
- Rank: 26 out of 68
Location

The Petah Tikva–Kiryat Aryeh railway station is a suburban passenger railway station in Israel, operated by Israel Railways. It is located in the northern Kiryat Aryeh business area and industrial zone of Petah Tikva, and mainly serves commuters from other towns who work in Petah Tikva. The station is adjacent to HaMoshava Stadium. It consists of a passenger hall and two side platforms serving two tracks on the Yarkon Railway. Space exists to allow converting the far side platform to an island platform, allowing the station to serve a total of three tracks in the future.

Located across the tracks from the Kiryat Aryeh railway station is the Tel Aviv Red Line light rail's maintenance depot, which also includes a passenger light rail station. A pedestrian tunnel under the tracks allows passengers to transfer between the heavy rail and light rail stations.

In October 2019 the station was the setting of a viral video. The video showcased a feral cat sitting on the gates while passengers streamed past it. The two-minute video went viral and accumulated millions of views and TV coverage around the world, a few days later the mayor of Petah Tikva came to pay tribute to the cat and was also caught on camera and became a part of the ongoing story

== Train service ==
| Preceding station | Israel Railways | Following station |
|---|---|---|
| Petah Tikva–Segula towards Herzliya | Herzliya–Ashkelon | Bnei Brak–Ramat HaHayal towards Ashkelon |

== Ridership ==
Passengers boarding and disembarking by year
| Year | Passengers | Rank | Source |
|---|---|---|---|
| 2021 | 559,290 (▲30,348) | 33 of 66 (▼4) | 2021 Freedom of Information Law Annual Report |
| 2020 | 528,942 (▼1,414,876) | 29 of 68 (▼3) | 2020 Freedom of Information Law Annual Report |
| 2019 | 1,943,818 | 26 of 68 | 2019 Freedom of Information Law Annual Report |
