= Østbanen =

Østbanen may refer to:

- Østbanen (Denmark), a local railway in Denmark
- Østbanen (Norway), a popular nickname of Oslo East Station, the forerunner of Oslo Central Station

== See also ==
- Ostbahn (disambiguation)
- Eastern Railway (disambiguation)
