= East Line =

East Line may refer to:

== Railways ==
- East Line (Denmark), a local railway line in eastern Zealand, Denmark
- East line (Macau Light Rapid Transit), a planned rapid transit line in Macau, China
- East Line (MARTA), a rapid transit line in Atlanta, Georgia, United States, now part of the Blue Line
- East Rail line, a rapid transit line in Hong Kong, China
- A Line (RTD), a commuter rail line in Denver, Colorado, United States, called the East Rail Line during planning and construction

== Other ==
- East Line Group, an airport infrastructure business in Russia

== See also ==
- East Link (disambiguation)
- East–West line (disambiguation)
- Eastern Line (disambiguation)
- Eastern Railway (disambiguation)
