= Petah Tikva–Segula railway station =

Railway station in Israel

Petah Tikva–Segula פתח תקווה – סגולה
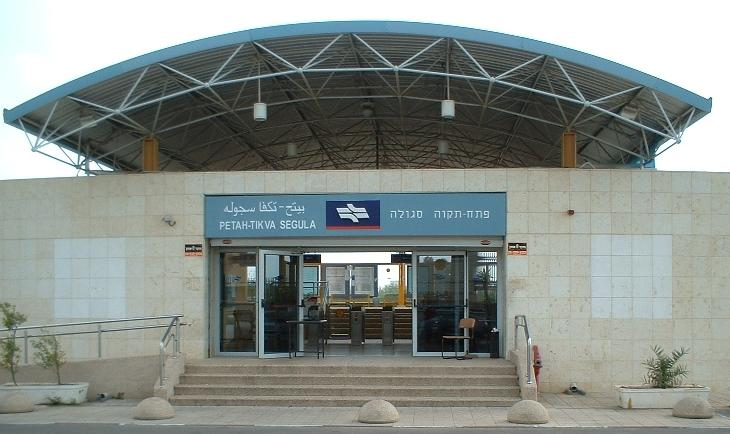

General information
- Location: Yarkonim shopping district Petah Tikva, Israel
- Coordinates: 32.111889°N 34.901032°E
- Line: Yarkon Railway
- Platforms: 2
- Tracks: 2

Construction
- Accessible: Yes

History
- Opened: 3 June 2000; 26 years ago
- Electrified: 25 December 2021; 4 years ago

Passengers
- 2019: 905,440
- Rank: 42 out of 68
Location

The Petah Tikva–Segula railway station is a suburban passenger railway station in Israel, operated by Israel Railways.

It is located on the Yarkon Railway in northeast Petah Tikva at the Yarkonim shopping district across the Segula industrial zone and is separated from the rest of the city. The station was opened in 2000 as part of the Tel Aviv - Rosh ha'ayin line. Initially a temporary structure was used and only a single platform was active, until late 2002 when the final structure was finished and both platforms became active.

The station's location is problematic, as it is contained within a commercial center that was constructed without the proper permits (although the station itself was legally built). As a result, after a series of failed legal appeals the center was closed in 2019, complicating the access to and parking at the station.

== Train service ==
Preceding station	Israel Railways	Following station
Rosh HaAyin–North towards Herzliya	Herzliya–Ashkelon	Petah Tikva–Kiryat Aryeh towards Ashkelon

== Ridership ==
Passengers boarding and disembarking by year
Year	Passengers	Rank	Source
2021	221,772 (▼15,929)	58 of 66 (▼11)	2021 Freedom of Information Law Annual Report
2020	237,701 (▼667,739)	47 of 68 (▼5)	2020 Freedom of Information Law Annual Report
2019	905,440	42 of 68	2019 Freedom of Information Law Annual Report
