= Airport City railway station =

Coordinates: 31°59′56″N 34°54′43″E

Airport City railway station, called Te'ufa railway station in Hebrew (Hebrew: תחנת הרכבת תעופה, Tahanat HaRakevet Te'ufa), is a future Israel Railways station under construction as part of the Eastern Railway. It is intended to service the Airport City business park west of Ben Gurion Airport's Terminal 1. In addition to Eastern Railway services, Airport City station will be linked to the existing Ben Gurion Airport railway station in Terminal 3, allowing direct services from Airport City to Tel Aviv, without a transfer from the Eastern Railway in Lod.

== History ==
The station was built on the lands of the ancient village of Kafr Jinnis.

Airport City station corresponds to the British Mandate for Palestine-era Kafr Jinnis railway station, which was built by the British military as part of a branch of the Eastern Railway to Al-Lubban during the Sinai and Palestine campaign of World War I; Kafr Jinnis was where the branch diverged from the Eastern Railway proper. Kafr Jinnis was closed for passenger services in 1933, but continued to exist as a freight station up until the 1950s.
