= Austrian Eastern Railway =

Railway company in Austria-Hungary

The Austrian Eastern Railway (German Ostbahn) was the name of a former railway company during the time of the Austro-Hungarian monarchy. Today, the term is still used to describe certain railway lines (Eastern railway) which were formerly operated by that company. The Ostbahn was founded as the private Raaber Bahn (or Wien-Raaber-Eisenbahn).

== History ==
In order to improve transport services compared to the only partially navigable Danube, the entrepreneur Georg Simon von Sina commissioned the engineer Matthias Schönerer to plan a railway from Vienna via Schwechat and Bruck an der Leitha. On 20 March 1838, Sina founded a committee consisting of subscribers who had already become financially active until the formation of a joint-stock company.

The line from Vienna to Bruck an der Leitha was constructed between 1840 and 1846. It was extended to Győr (German Raab) in 1855 and later to Budapest. Later it merged with another private railway company, the Staatseisenbahngesellschaft, which operated the line from Vienna to Pressburg (now Bratislava), and the line via Mistelbach and Laa an der Thaya to Brno.

The company was nationalized in 1909. After 1945, the service between Laa and Brno was disconnected. The Vienna East Station from which the lines operated had been destroyed in World War II and was merged with the nearby Vienna South Station during reconstruction.
