= Granot Central Cooperative =

Agriculture Cooperative

Granot Central Cooperative Ltd.
- Type: Cooperative
- Industry: Agricultural
- Founded: 1940
- Headquarters: Emek Hefer, Israel
- Area served: Israel
- Key people: Roberto Kuperman CEO
- Revenue: ₪ 3,500 million (2011)
- Net income: + ₪ 215 million (2011)
- Number of employees: 12,000
- Parent: Owned by 42 Kibbutzim (With 25,000 residents in total)
- Subsidiaries: Ambar Feed Mill, Granot Avocado, Rimon Ltd., Meyram Ltd., Amal Siudit
- Website: granot.coop

Granot Central Cooperative Ltd. is a purchasing organization of the kibbutz movement in Israel. It markets fruits and vegetables directly to food chains and wholesale markets.

== History ==
Granot was established in 1940 in order to utilize economics of scale both in marketing agricultural products and reducing purchasing prices of goods for the member farms. Uniting the farms into one big cooperative, made it possible to use expansive technologies for processing agricultural products. This helps to reduce costs and finance operating capital necessary to sustain the agricultural farms.

In 2023, Granot Central Cooperative invested in Neolithics, a company founded in 2021 which has developed a technology for advanced quality control of fresh produce that allows fruit and vegetables to be classified according to the level of harvesting and ripeness of the produce. As part of the collaboration with Neolithics, Granot will establish an avocado lab to treat fresh agricultural produce after harvest.

== Operations ==
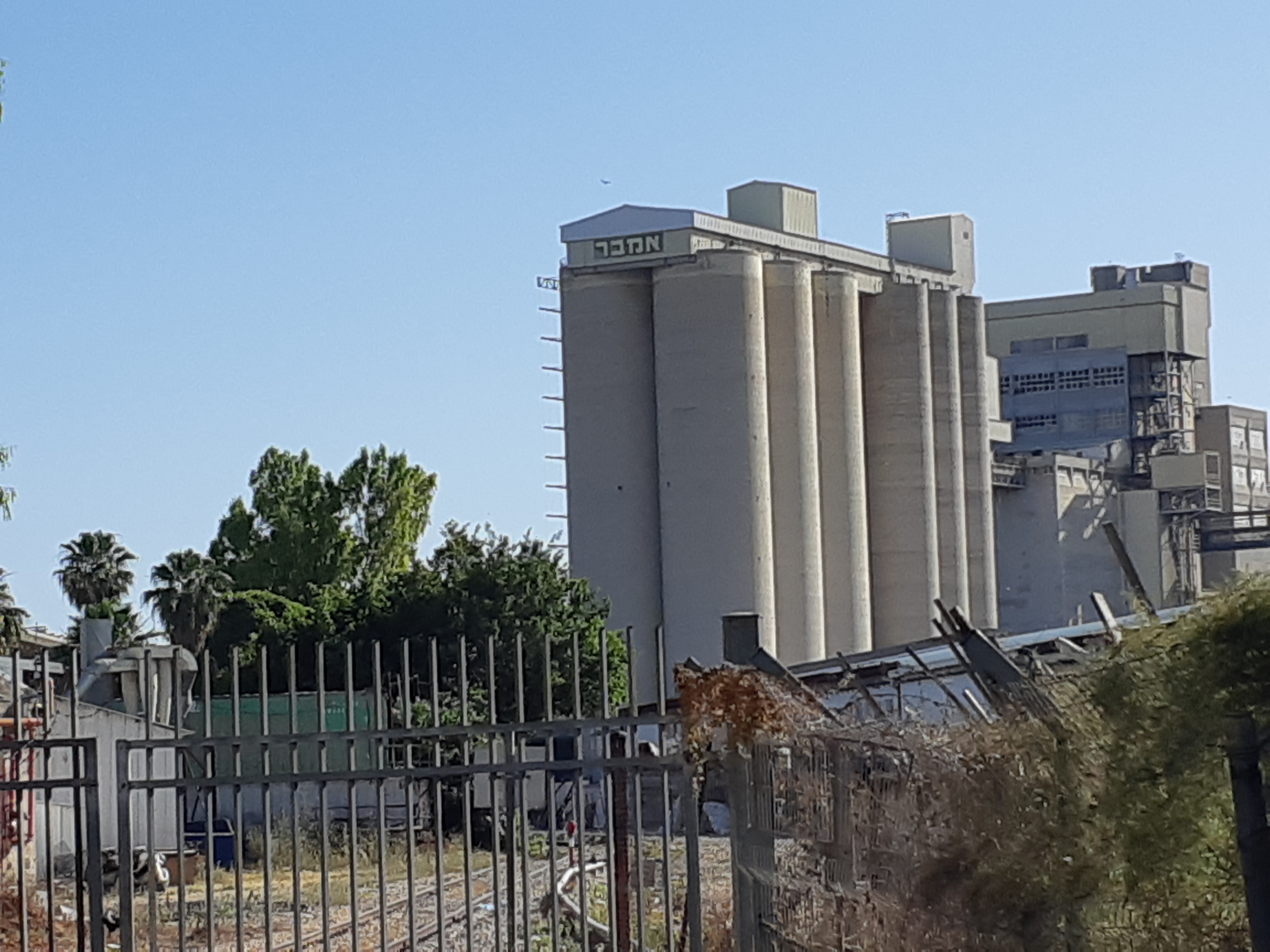
Ambar Feed Mill

The chairman is Amit Ben Itzhak, who has held the position since 2014. Granot oversees 20 factories and companies owned by 43 kibbutzim in Israel's coastal and central region. It operates in a wide range of economic sectors: finances, holdings, purchasing, agriculture (avocado, citrus fruits, cowsheds, poultry), industry (feed mills, food, slaughter houses, seed technologies development, refrigerated storage), infrastructures, energy, information technologies, real estate, labor recruitment, transportation, on-job professional training and more.

== Granot corporations ==
Ambar Feed Mill operates animal feed mills in Israel, one in Gan Shmuel (Ambar North) and another in Dvira (Ambar South). Total annual production is nearly one million tons of compound feed. Granot Avocado & Citrus Cooperative produces one third of the total Israeli avocado yield and citrus. It runs the largest avocado packing house in Israel.

== Holdings ==
- 100% of Mey-Ram Water Ltd., the leading private company in Israel, dealing with management of water and electricity resources in the Israeli rural sector.
- 66% of Rimon Ltd. deals with entrepreneurship and execution of projects in the field of recycled water.
- 7.5% of Tnuva Ltd., the leading food company in Israel. (Together with other Kibbutzim organizations holds 23.5% of the company)
