= Rosh HaAyin–North railway station =

Railway station in Israel

Rosh HaAyin–North ראש העין – צפון
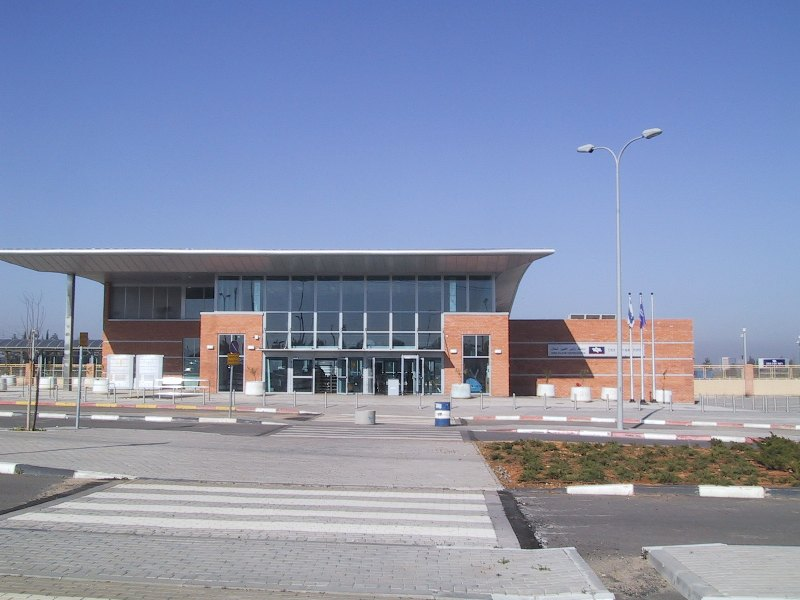

General information
- Location: next to Qasim Interchange, in the north of Rosh HaAyin, Israel
- Coordinates: 32°7′14.42″N 34°56′4.65″E
- Platforms: 4 (platforms 1-2 are closed temporary due to development works)
- Tracks: 3

Construction
- Accessible: Yes

History
- Opened: 13 September 2003; 22 years ago
- Electrified: 25 December 2021; 4 years ago

Passengers
- 2019: 1,573,945
- Rank: 30 out of 68
Location

The Rosh HaAyin–North railway station is a suburban passenger railway station in Israel, operated by Israel Railways. It is situated in north Rosh HaAyin near the Kesem Interchange which is located at the intersection of Highway 5 and the Cross-Israel Highway.

The station has one side platform and one island platform serving a total of 3 tracks. As part of the Eastern Railway rebuilding project an additional side platform have been built at the station, allowing it to serve a total of four tracks.

Facilities at the station:

- Wheelchair Accessibility
- Ticket Machine
- Parking adjacent to the station
- Food and Drinks shop
- Bicycle parking
- Wi-Fi

== Train service ==
Preceding station	Israel Railways	Following station
Kfar Saba–Nordau towards Herzliya	Herzliya–Ashkelon	Petah Tikva–Segula towards Ashkelon

== Ridership ==
Passengers boarding and disembarking by year
Year	Passengers	Rank	Source
2021	519,834 (▲44,374)	34 of 66 (▼1)	
2020	475,460 (▼1,098,485)	33 of 68 (▼3)	
2019	1,573,945	30 of 68	
