= Eastern Railway (Israel) =

Railway line in Israel

Coordinates: 32°9′0.06″N 34°56′7.8″E

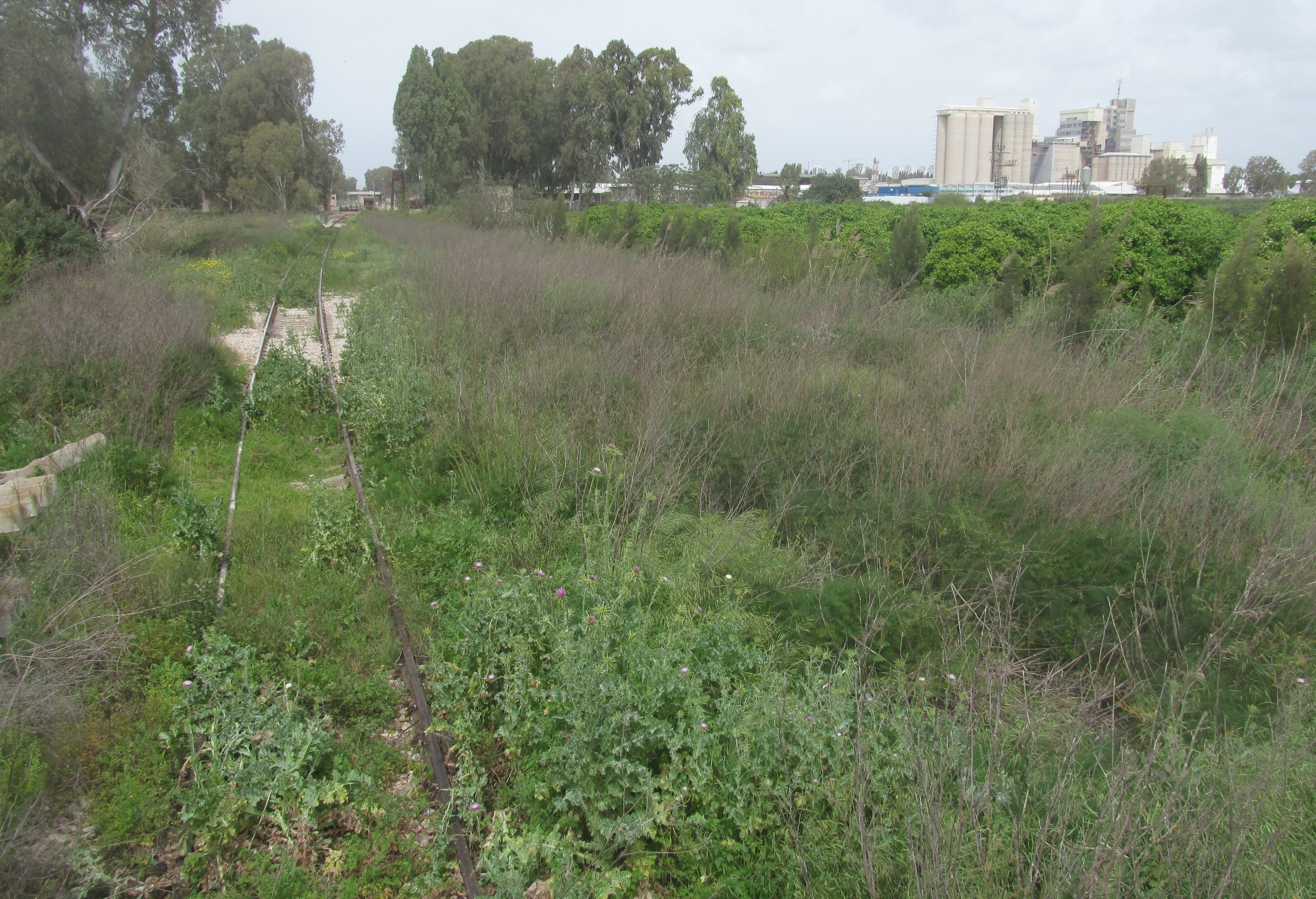
The southern end of the Remez Junction–Hadera section as it appeard in 2018 prior to the rebuild, looking north towards Hadera East, the northernmost station on the line.

The Eastern Railway (Hebrew: המסילה המזרחית, romanized: ha-mesila ha-mizraḥit) is a railroad in central Israel stretching from Lod to Hadera.

The line opened in 1915, although between 1969 and 2026 only the section between Kfar Saba and Lod, as well as a short section just north of Hadera were in use, with the rest of the railway having been abandoned. In the early to mid-2020s, the formerly abandoned section was rebuilt as part of a large-scale project to reconstruct and upgrade the railway along the entire route.

== History ==
=== Ottoman Empire ===
The railway was constructed by the Ottoman authorities in Palestine during the Sinai and Palestine Campaign of World War I, to assist them with moving men and matériel in the war effort. It entered service on 30 October 1915, connecting Tulkarm (where it connected to a branch line of the Jezreel Valley Railway, and through it to the greater Hejaz Railway) and Lod, where it connected to the Jaffa–Jerusalem railway and the Railway to Beersheba. An extension northwards from Tulkarm to Hadera was also built in order to supply the railway with timber collected from the forests around Hadera that was used as fuel and for infrastructure. The line was built as narrow gauge (1,050 mm or 3 ft 5 11/32 in) like the rest of the Ottoman railways in the region and was situated relatively inland to avoid the reach of naval guns from Royal Navy warships patrolling the Mediterranean coast.

=== British Mandate ===
After the British conquered the area, they converted the railway to standard gauge and extended it from Hadera north to the port city of Haifa. It then became the main north-south rail link in Mandatory Palestine and was operated by Palestine Railways. While the Jaffa-Jerusalem railway was also converted to standard gauge at the same time, the Jezreel Valley Railway was not and therefore it was no longer possible for trains using the Eastern Railway to travel to sections of the Hejaz Railway due to the gauge break. During the Mandate period, stations on the Eastern Railway operated in Hadera, Qaqun, Tulkarm, Qalqilyah, Rosh HaAyin, Rantiya, Kafr Jinis, and Lydda (Lod). In the later stages of World War II and for a short time thereafter, the Eastern Railway was one link in a larger contiguous standard gauge rail network that allowed trains to travel all the way from Anatolia to southern Egypt.

=== Israel ===
==== 20th century ====
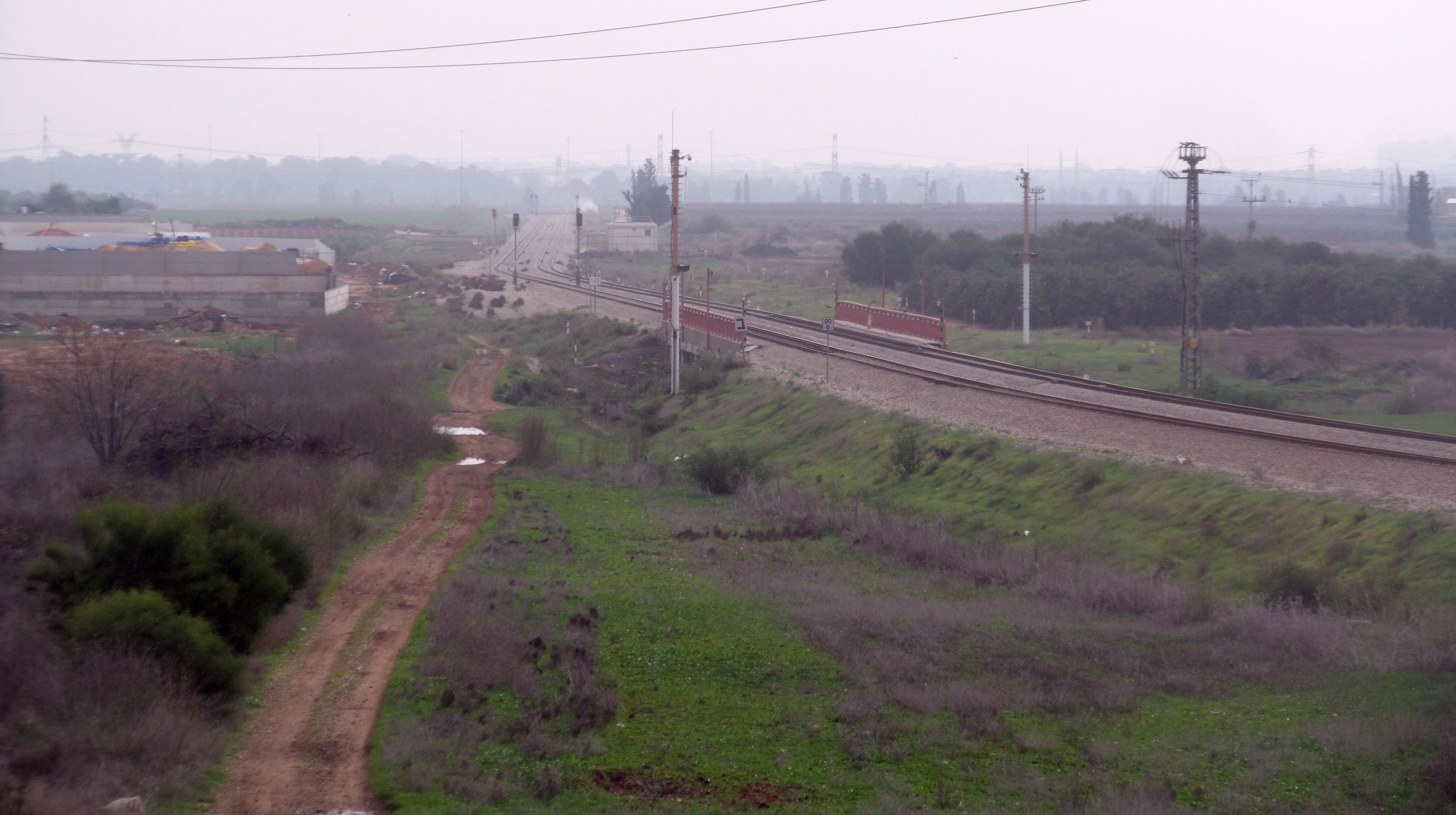
The north end of the Lod–Kfar Saba section in 2017: the dirt road aligns with the original single-track line to Hadera; the double-track line curving to the right is the beginning of the Sharon Railway

When the State of Israel was established in 1948, most of the line lay within its borders, except for a small section of railway near Tulkarm. In 1949 a bypass was constructed west of Tulkarm which allowed renewal of service on the railway. In 1953, Israel Railways completed constructing the Coastal Railway from Hadera to Tel Aviv on a route roughly paralleling the Eastern Railway's, but much closer to the coastline, where most of the population resides. Nevertheless, some passenger and freight service on the Eastern railway continued operating, partly to show Israeli presence in the region around the railway which lay very close to the 1949 Armistice Line – then the country's eastern border with Jordan. The railway also derived its name from this easterly location within the country. After Israel came to control both sides of the Armistice Line following the 1967 Six-Day War, service on the section of the line from just south of the Hadera East railway station to Kfar Saba was discontinued in 1969. This railway section was effectively abandoned, and had since then been dismantled.

The rest of the line between Kfar Saba and Lod continued operating, albeit mainly for freight services, with a few passenger trains making use of the section between Rosh HaAyin and Lod on the way from northern Tel Aviv and points north of it to the old Jerusalem station and to southern Israel. This was because until the 1990s the Ayalon Railway did not exist and thus there was no north-south rail connection through Tel Aviv itself. As such, this section of the Eastern Railway was the only link between the northern and southern portions of Israel's rail network. In the early 2000s, the Kfar Saba–Rosh HaAyin section was rebuilt and double tracked. It now forms part of the suburban railway line serving cities in the southern Sharon plain.

Another part of the Eastern Railway that continued operating is a short section which connects the Hadera East railway station to the Coastal Railway at a point near Pardes Hanna named Remez Junction. Hadera East, a terminal station since 1969, was from then on only used for handling freight trains bound for the adjacent Granot "Ambar North" large feed mill complex.

==== 21st century ====
Partly to alleviate congestion on the Coastal Railway as well as to increase freight capacity on the national rail network and provide rail access to a planned inland port, the government of Israel announced in 2016 plans to revive the old Eastern line at a projected cost of at least NIS 10 billion (appx. US$2.7 billion in 2018 dollars). The project involves rebuilding the railroad in the Hadera – Kfar Saba section and upgrading the existing section between Rosh HaAyin and Lod, including the construction of 30 grade separations, ten other supporting structures, and connections and flying junctions with other railroads. The entire route will be electrified and double-tracked, and stations will be constructed in Kokhav Ya'ir, El'ad, and the Airport City office park (near the old Kafr Jinis station). A significant portion of the railway will be built alongside the existing Cross-Israel Highway.

In 2018, the National Roads Company (Netivei Yisrael) began acquiring land necessary for the project. The awarding of construction contracts began in 2019 with actual works expected to commence in 2020 and take 6 to 7 years to complete. The National Roads Company is supervising the rebuilding of the defunct line from Hadera to Kfar Sava, while Israel Railways is managing the upgrading and double-tracking of the section between Rosh HaAyin and Lod.

On May 19, 2026, Prime Minister Benjamin Netanyahu and Transport Minister Miri Regev opened the Samaria-Tayibe station outside the city of Tayibe. On June 28, 2026 the Hadera-Kfar Sava section opened for service, albeit with some passenger stations remaining under construction, electrification works ongoing, and the section between Rosh HaAyin and Lod still undergoing extensive upgrade and double-tracking works.
