= Tel Aviv Metro =

Planned subway system around Tel Aviv, Israel

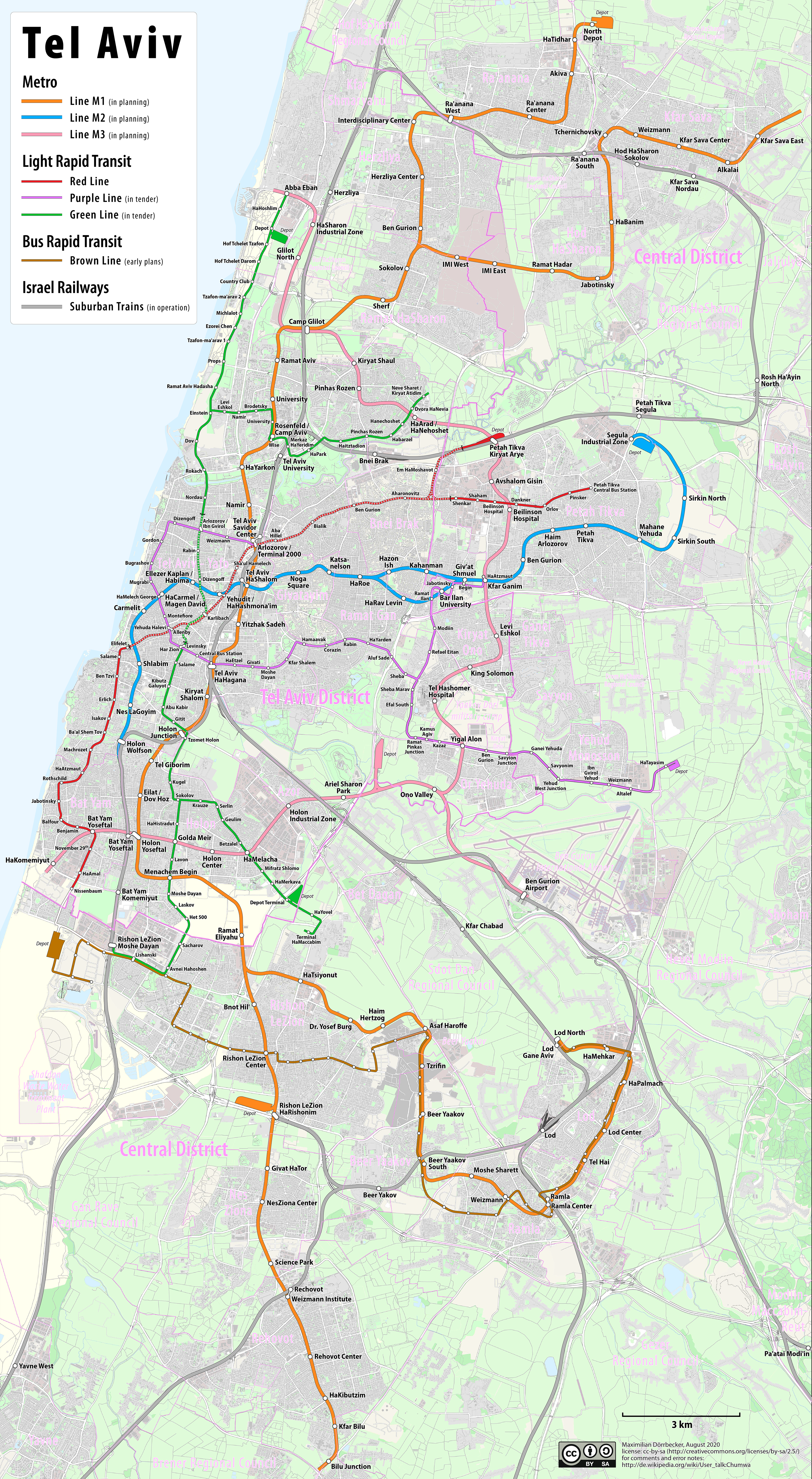
- Outline of the Tel Aviv Metro

Overview
- Owner: NTA Metropolitan Mass Transit
- Locale: Gush Dan, Israel
- Transit type: Rapid transit
- Number of lines: 3
- Number of stations: 109
- Website: www.nta.co.il/en/metro/

Operation
- Operation will start: 2037; 11 years' time

Technical
- System length: 145 km (90 mi)

Tel Aviv Metro (also MetroTLV) is an underground rapid transit system being built in the Tel Aviv Metropolitan Area. It will consist of three metro lines (M1, M2 and M3) with a total of 109 stations across 145 km of route. The Metro will operate alongside the Tel Aviv Light Rail and Israel Railways suburban lines in the city. The trains are expected to be fully automated to GoA4 standard, without the need for a driver.

Preliminary construction work started in 2025, with public opening scheduled for 2037. The legal foundation for building the metro is found in National Outline Plan 70.

== History ==
The plan for the metro was raised in 2015 by the Israeli ministry of finance, bypassing the transportation ministry. The ministry's rationale was that the light rail plan would not be sufficient to answer Tel Aviv's transportation needs as early as the 2020s, when the first lines would be completed. Multiple alternatives were proposed in internal discussions. At the time, the plan was met with surprise by the transportation ministry.

By early 2016, the two ministries agreed on a general outline that would include three of the seven planned light rail lines, in addition to three new metro lines. In September 2016, the government-owned company NTA (Hebrew acronym for Urban Transportation Lines) released a feasibility study tender for the metro lines. The final cost of all lines is estimated at NIS 130–150 billion (USD 40–46 billion).

In July 2018, NTA published a tender for the planning of the three subway lines. In July 2018, McKinsey submitted a report on the financial aspects of the project to the Israeli government. The architects chosen to head the planning teams are Dana Kehat from Mansfeld–Kehat for M1, Eliezer Armon for M2 and Edna Lerman for M3.

On 15 April 2019, the National Infrastructures Committee approved the route of all three metro lines.

In December 2022, trial excavation to assess the ground conditions to be encountered during the construction of the metro began.

On 29 August 2023, Israeli Transport Minister Miri Regev signed an order allowing land acquisition to build the metro system to begin.

On 18 December 2025, a cornerstone laying ceremony was held to mark the start of construction work on the project in Petah Tikva. The ceremony was attended by Prime Minister Benjamin Netanyahu and Transport Minister Miri Regev.

== Plan ==
Line	Length	Route
M1	85 km (53 mi)	Ra'anana – Herzliya – Ramat HaSharon – Northern Tel Aviv – Tel Aviv University – Bavli – Ayalon Highway (Tel Aviv) – Yigal Allon Street – Kiryat Shalom – Central Holon – Central Rishon LeZion – Ness Ziona – Rehovot – Bilu Junction
M1	85 km (53 mi)	Kfar Saba – Hod HaSharon – IWI Ramat HaSharon – Kiryat Atidim and Ramat HaHayal – Tel Aviv University – Bavli – Ayalon Highway (Tel Aviv) – Yigal Allon Street – Kiryat Shalom – Central Holon – Rishon LeZion Old Industrial Zone – Tzrifin – Be'er Ya'akov – Ramla – Lod
M2	26 km (16 mi)	Wolfson Medical Center – Central Tel Aviv – HaKirya – Nahalat Yitzhak – Giv'atayim – South Bnei Brak – Bar Ilan University – Giv'at Shmu'el – Petah Tikva
M3	39 km (24 mi)	Southern Bat Yam – Southern Holon – Holon Industrial Zone – Azor – Or Yehuda – Sheba Medical Center – Kiryat Ono – Ramat Siv and Kiryat Aryeh – Northeast Tel Aviv – Glilot – Herzliya Pituah

== Costs ==
The projected cost of the scheme is ILS 150 billion, of which ILS 82 billion would go to the two lines labeled M1, including value added tax.

Within M1, the cost of moving infrastructure would cost ILS 2.5 billion. The 55 stations would cost ILS 19 billion, or approximately US $100 million per station. Tunneling would cost ILS 13 billion, systems would cost ILS 5 billion, and rolling stock – ILS 2.5 billion.

== See also ==
- Tel Aviv Light Rail
- Jerusalem Metro
- History of Tel Aviv
- Transport in Israel
