= Ariel Sharon Park =

Israeli environmental park

- פארק אריאל שרון
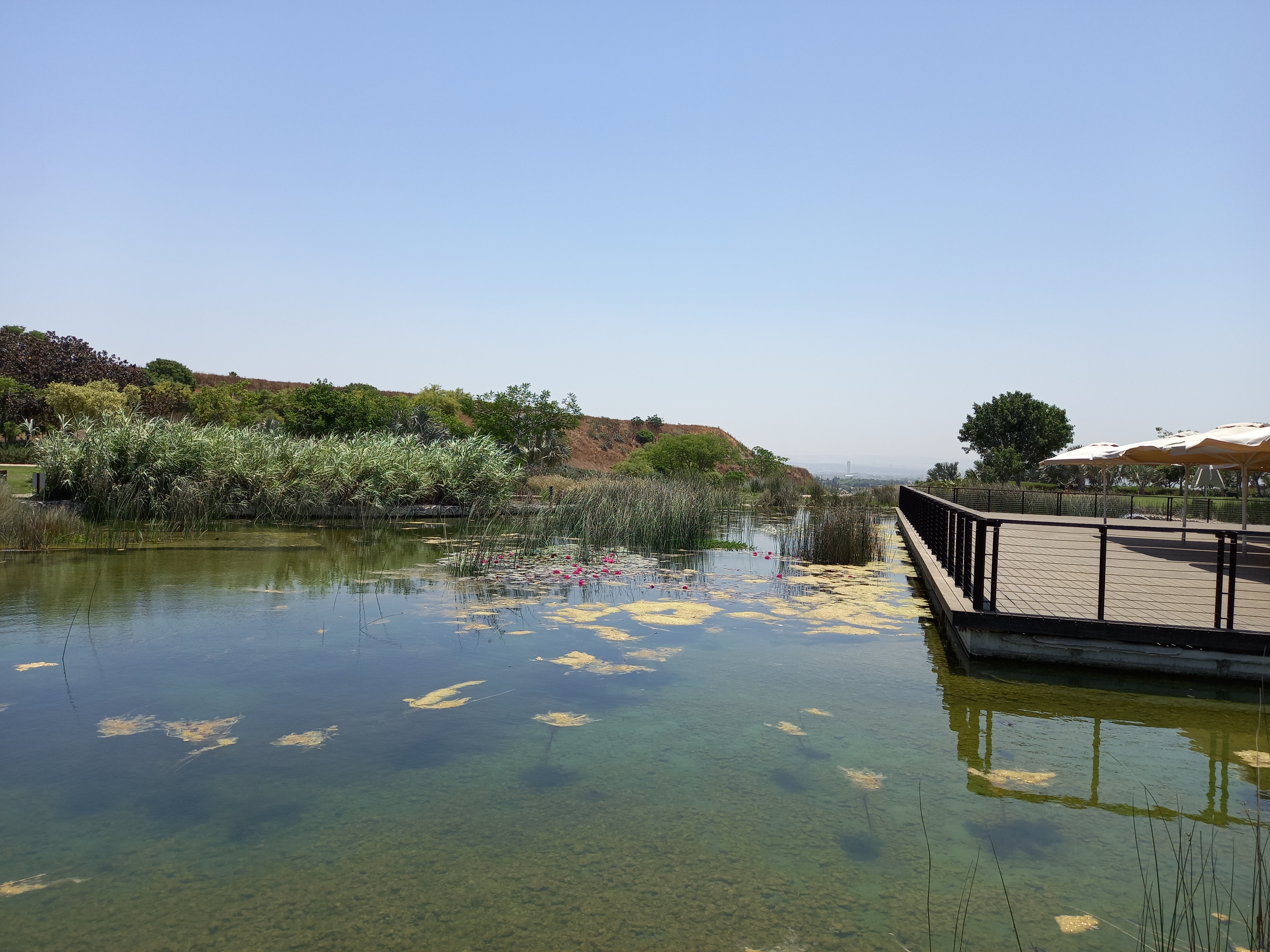
- Interactive map of Ariel Sharon Park
- Type: Environmental park
- Location: Israel
- Nearest city: Tel Aviv
- Coordinates: 32°1′36.93″N 34°49′26.71″E
- Area: 8.5 square kilometres (3.3 mi^{2}; 2,100 acres)
- Created: October 27, 2007
- Founder: Beracha Foundation
- Designer: Peter Latz
- Etymology: Ariel Sharon
- Operator: Ariel Sharon Park Company

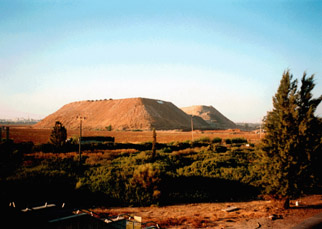
Hiriya waste mountain

Ariel Sharon Park (Hebrew: פארק אריאל שרון) is an Israeli environmental park. Situated along the lines of the Ayalon River in the area between Ben Gurion Airport and Highway 20 (Ayalon Highway), the area was intended to be the "green lung" of the southern part of the Gush Dan metropolitan area. The park was established on the former Hiriya (Hebrew: חירייה) landfill located southeast of Tel Aviv, and encompasses Menachem Begin Park, Mikveh Israel village, and the former Shalem Farm. The landfill and its surrounding area have been transformed into a large park that is still under construction.

== History ==
The Hiriya landfill was located on the lands of the Palestinian village of al-Khayriyya, from which the name Hiriya is derived. The village, formerly called Ibn Ibraq, preserving the name of the ancient biblical site Beneberak, was renamed al-Khayriyya in 1924. In the weeks prior to the outbreak of the 1948 Arab-Israeli War, its residents fled the village before advancing Haganah forces.

According to Rachelle Gershovitz of the Israel Venture Capital Journal, the British authorities designated the area as Crown Land and plans were drawn up to use it as a draining plain to solve the annual flooding problem during the British Mandate.

Hiriya is visible on approach into Ben Gurion International Airport as a flat-topped hill. Earmarked as a dump in 1952, the site grew to be more than 800 metres (0.50 mi) and over 80 metres (87 yd) above sea level. The volume of waste was estimated at 16 million cubic meters. Calls to shut down the site mounted in the wake of the growing public awareness of environmental pollution, underground water contamination and the spread of noxious gases. Thousands of sea gulls and other birds attracted by the decomposing garbage created a hazard for commercial airliners taking off and landing at nearby Ben Gurion Airport. Three recycling facilities have been established at the foot of the mountain: a waste separation center, a green waste facility that produces mulch and a building materials recycling plant.

In 1988, Hiriya ceased functioning as a waste landfill. After accumulating 25 million tons of waste, the Hiriya facility was shut down in August 1998. Since Hiriya is not under the jurisdiction of any municipality, the site is managed by the Dan Region Association of Towns Sanitation and Solid Waste Disposal board.

== Environmental park ==
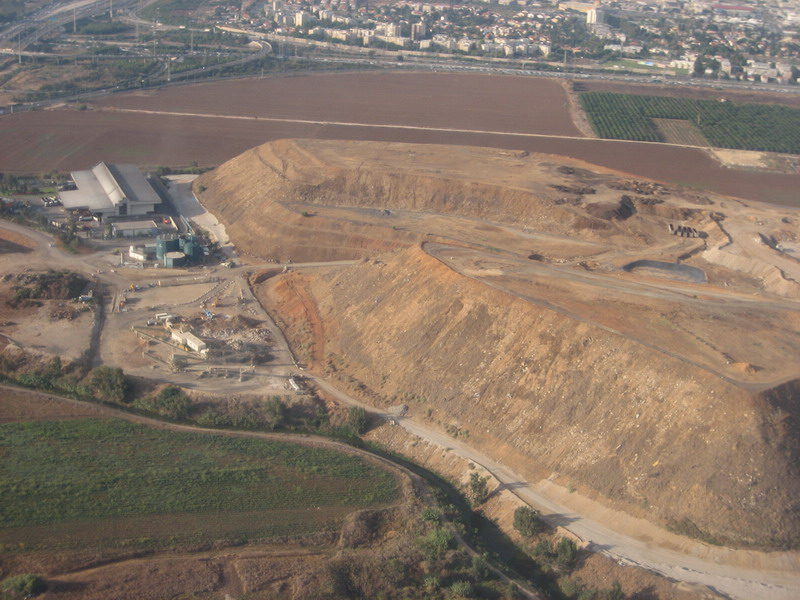
Hiriya from above before the renovation.

In 2004, an international competition was held calling for ideas on how to rehabilitate the mountain of garbage, turn it into a positive landmark and keep it from collapsing into the Ayalon riverbed. Plans were subsequently drawn up to remediate the site and use the mountain and surrounding land as the centerpiece of Ariel Sharon Park. An 8.1-square-kilometre (2,000-acre) area was demarcated for the park during the term of the then Israeli prime minister Ariel Sharon, who was an avid supporter of the project. The park was later named for Sharon. The project received the full backing of Environmental Protection Minister Gilad Erdan, and was planned by German landscape architect and urban planner Peter Latz. Latz has invented a technique to protect future flowers and fruits from contaminants: The landscape is being covered with a "bioplastic" layer that blocks methane, topped with layers of gravel and a meter of clean soil.

As of 2011, the park was partially opened to visitors while it remained under construction. The completed park will be three times the size of New York's Central Park, and will encompass the areas of Menachem Begin Park, Mikveh Israel village and the former Shalem Farm. Operated by the Ariel Sharon Park Company, the park will introduce many new ecological technologies. A 50,000-seat amphitheater will also be built there.

In 2026, it was decided to move the Ramat Gan Safari to Ariel Sharon Park so that new housing could be built on the safari's current site.

== Remaining waste processing assets ==
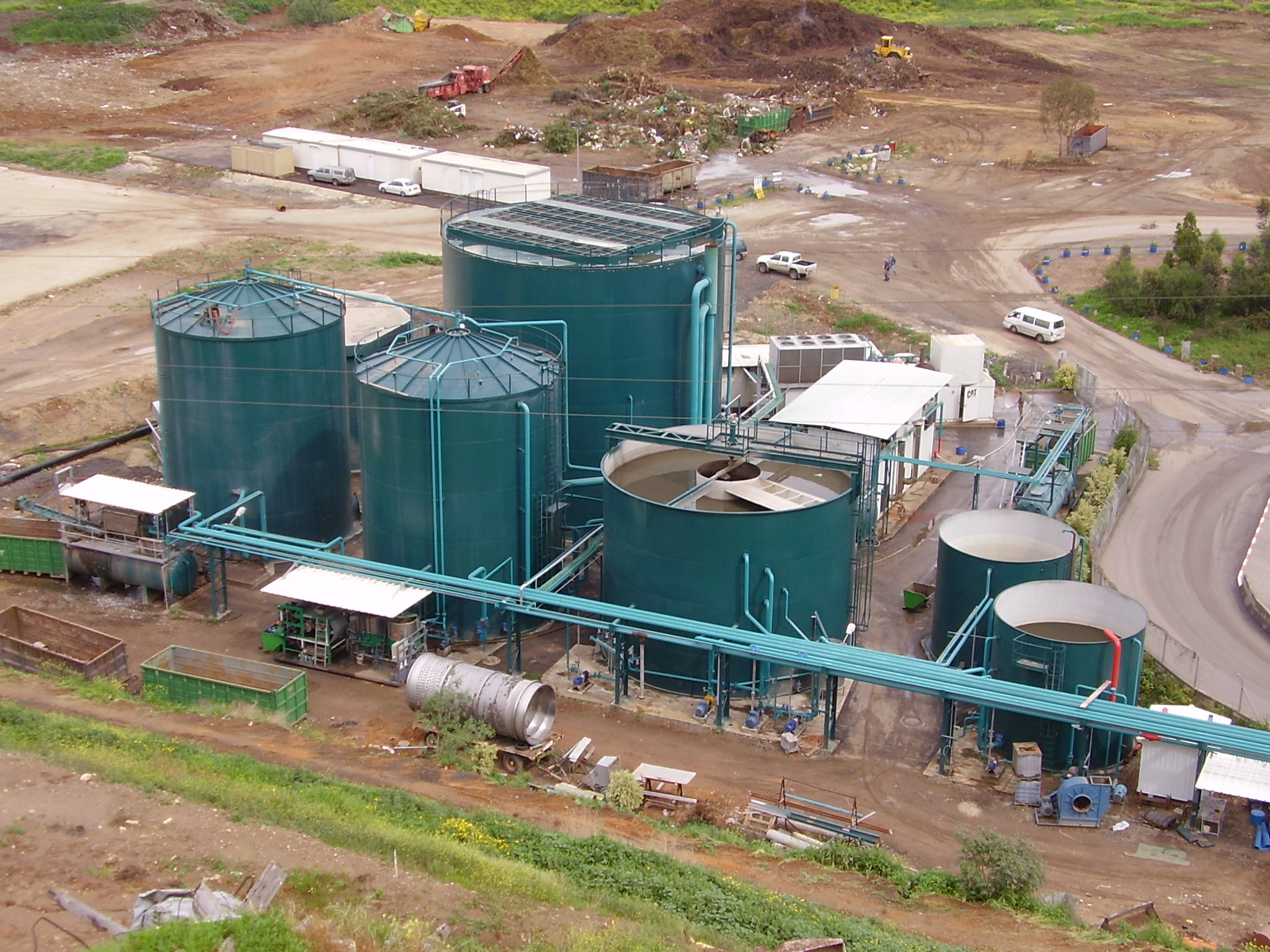
Anaerobic digesters at Hiriya waste facility

As of 2007, Hiriya was housing the largest waste transfer station in Israel. Doron Saphir was Hiriya's chairman. Three recycling plants operated at the foot of the mound, grinding building waste into gravel and dry organic matter into mulch, and a patented mechanical biological treatment demonstration facility where municipal solid waste was sorted utilising the properties of water. The facility was a form of materials recovery facility including upflow anaerobic sludge blanket digesters for the provision of biogas, which was in turn used to generate renewable energy utilising gas engines.

In 2007 garden waste was sorted, and tree trunks were sent to the Hiriya carpentry shop to be recycled into wooden furniture such as benches and garden accessories for use in the park. Sixty gas wells have been drilled at the site to collect the methane gas trapped in the landfill. The plant generated all the electricity required by the Hiriya site and sold the excess to the Israel Electric Corporation.

As described in a 2004 article, a recycling facility operated by the Israeli company ArrowEcology has introduced a new technology known as ArrowBio that separates recyclable materials using water technology. Eighty percent of the waste that enters the system is reused, while only 20 percent ends up in the landfill.

== Film ==
In 2011, a short film about the transformation of the site, The Hiriya Project: A Mountain of Change, won first prize in the Clean Development Mechanism Changing Lives Photo and Video Contest sponsored by the United Nations Framework Convention on Climate Change (UNFCCC) in Durban.

== See also ==
- List of solid waste treatment technologies
- Mechanical biological treatment
- Constructed wetland
- Ramat Hovav
- Glilot Ecological Park
