= Glilot Ecological Park =

Urban green space in Tel Aviv

- פארק אקולוגי גלילות
- Interactive map of Glilot Ecological Park
- Type: Urban nature park
- Location: Tel Aviv-Yafo / Ramat HaSharon, Israel
- Nearest city: Tel Aviv

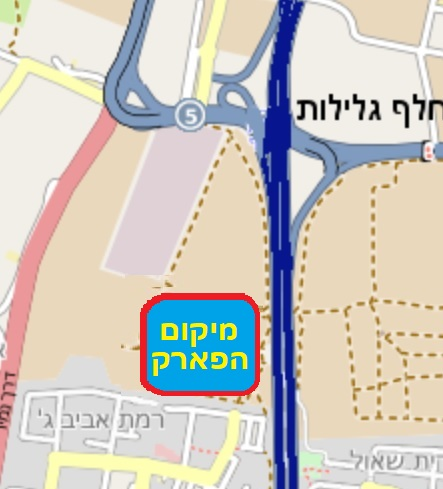
Location map of Glilot Ecological Park

Glilot Ecological Park (also known as Eco-Park Glilot) is an urban green space area located north of Ramat Aviv Gimel in the northern part of Tel Aviv. The park lies west of the "Ayalon Highway" and southeast of the former Pi Glilot fuel terminal.

The park includes the Ahiya Stream, which flows through the area. Vegetation in the park includes Eucalyptus groves and seasonal blooms of narcissus. The park also contains an archaeological site consisting of burial caves from the Samaritan period, known as the Afeka Caves.

Within the park is Drezner Grove, named after Yehi'el Dov Dresner.

== History ==
For many decades, construction in the area was limited due to the presence of the nearby Pi Glilot fuel storage tanks, which stored large quantities of petroleum products. In 2002, an agreement was signed to evacuate the fuel and gas facilities from the Pi Glilot complex. Following the evacuation, much of the land was used as parking areas for automobile sales.

In 2017, the Tel Aviv District Planning and Building Committee approved a large construction plan for the surrounding area. However, in October 2021 the plan was cancelled following public objections.

== See also ==
- Ariel Sharon Park
