= National Outline Plan =

A national outline plan (Hebrew: תוכנית מתאר ארצית, Tokhnit Mit'ar Artzit, abbr. תמ"א, Tama) refers to a zoning and development statutory plan in a specific field on a national level in Israel. A national outline plan is meant to affect the entire country and influences planning on the regional and local levels. In general, each national plan is augmented by more local plans that discuss its implementation in more detail. National outline plans are drafted by the National Planning and Construction Committee or the National Infrastructure Committee, and approved by the government of Israel.

The first national outline plan, created by architect Aryeh Sharon, was approved in 1951, and dealt with settling the Negev and Galilee regions. However, this plan was never implemented. The first national plan to be put to practical use was National Outline Plan 3, approved in 1976, dealing with road infrastructure in the country.

== List of current national outline plans ==
#	Description	Approval resolution	Approval date	Notes
1	National master plan that unifies most National Outline Plans	—	January 12, 2020	
3	National road infrastructure plan. Discusses road and highway classifications and major routes.	902	August 1, 1976	
4	Partial plan for the Ben Gurion International Airport (then Lod International Airport), Israel's main airport.	550	April 20, 1969	
5	Partial plan for connecting the Ben Gurion International Airport to Tel Aviv.	214	December 5, 1968	
6	Plan for the population distribution in the country.		1975	
7	National plan for institutions that are able to zone public facilities such as hospitals, colleges and universities and stadiums.		June 29, 1975	
8	National park and nature reserve plan, including a list of parks and reserves.	693	June 21, 1981	
10	Partial plan for power plants and the electricity distribution system.	488	February 18, 1973	
11	National plan for lake and water reservoir creation, and the utilization of above-ground water sources.	438	February 26, 1984	
12	National plan for tourist installations.	1214	January 9, 1983	
13	Plan for Lake Kinneret shoreline development and preservation.		November 11, 1981	
14	Partial plan for mining and quarry sites, primarily in the north of the country.	3615	April 9, 1998	
15	National airport and heliport plan. Does not include military airports, the Ben Gurion International Airport and Sde Dov Airport.	1597	May 4, 2000	
16	National garbage disposal plan.	255	March 2, 1989	
18	National fuel station plan.	985	August 22, 1976	
19	National cemetery plan.	872	November 17, 1987	
21	National plan for the development and preservation and Independence War sites.	1980	November 14, 1981	
22	National forestry plan.		November 1, 1995	
23	National railroad plan.	1675	June 15, 1986	
24	National prison plan. Includes construction standards and mapping existing and planned prisons.	430	March 7, 1982	Map (in Hebrew)
27	National plan for cement.			
28	National plan for radio relay stations, including the Voice of America.			
29	Plan for memorial sites in the Jerusalem and Haifa districts.			
30	Plan for the southern Haifa Bay.		2008	
31	National plan for immigrant absorption.	674	January 17, 1993	
32	National plan for the liquefied petroleum gas industry.	1964	July 13, 2000	
33	National plan for providing sites for quick temporary housing. The plan was drafted in response to the Aliyah from the former Soviet Union in the 1990s.			
34	National water management and sewerage plan.	409	March 19, 2003	
35	National construction and development plan until 2020. The plan aims to provide answers for the balance between zoning and infrastructure development, nature preservation, and other subjects.	4467	November 27, 2005	Set to serve as a basis for a National Outline Plan for Uganda.
36	National cellular infrastructure plan. Deals primarily with cellular antennae.	1759	May 2, 2002	
37	National natural gas plan.	2933	February 28, 2001	
38	National plan for strengthening buildings against earthquakes.	3537	April 14, 2005	
39	Development plan for the Nitzanim – northern Ashkelon region.	4466	November 28, 2005	
40	Development and defense of underground facilities		TBD	
41	Energy infrastructure		TBD	
42	Land transportation		2008	Set to replace plans 3 and 23
43	Defense installations and infrastructure		May 13, 2008	
44	Urban development for non-Jewish population in northern Israel		May 12, 2009	
46	Detention center for infiltrators from Egypt		February 10, 2011	
47	Housing plan for future IDF bases		TBD	
49	National healthcare plan		TBD	
70	Development plan for the Tel Aviv Metro		TBD	

== Future ==
As of 2013, there is a plan to merge all National Outline Plans, except Plan 35, to one master plan.
