= Doron Saphir =

Israeli politician

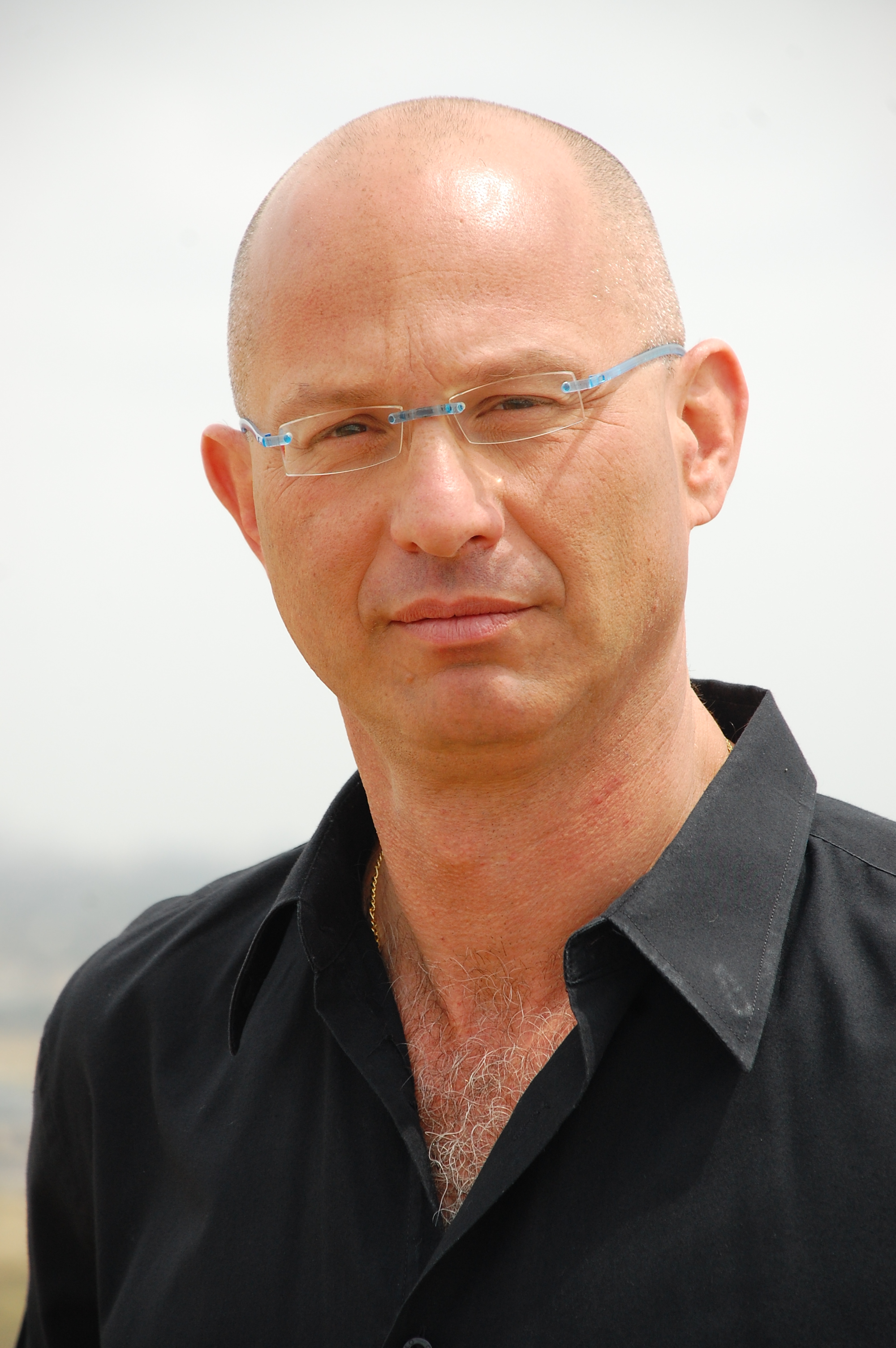
Doron Sapir

Doron Sapir (Hebrew: דורון ספיר; born 1959) was the first deputy mayor of Tel Aviv between 1996 and 2024. He was also chairman of the building and Planning committee and a board member at the Dan Municipal Sanitation Association and is until today a board member at ISWA (International Solid Waste Association).

== Biography ==
Doron Saphir holds a BA in Middle East studies and a diploma in journalism from the University of Tel Aviv. He is also a licensed attorney and arbitrator, having studied law at the Interdisciplinary Center in Herzliya.

== Public activism ==
In his past, Sapir served as chairman of Israel's National Student Association and subsequently, for a period of four years, as director of the Student Department at the Histadrut (Israel's organization of trade unions). During the 1989–1996 period, he served as manager of the Youth and Students Department in the Histadrut and in 1991 he established the Child Health Association and served as its chairman until 1999. In addition, Sapir also served as director of Issta Lines and, in 1998–2000, as active chairman of the board at Diunon publishing house. Sapir served as director at the Fredric R. Mann Culture Center (a.k.a. “The Culture Palace”), the Economic Development Corporation, Sports Palaces Ltd. and in the National Theatre - "HaBima."In December 1998 Sapir was elected chairman and CEO Dan Municipal Sanitation Association, a position that enabled him to act for environmental rehabilitation of the Hiriya Disposal Site. He also served as team leader of the team responsible for promotion and management of the Ariel Sharon Park site design until founding of the government company which was to assume responsibility for its subsequent management. At the Hiriya site his work included construction of a collection system for methane that is formed by fermentation of the organic waste in this large mountain of trash and the utilization of this methane for the production of green energy. The system in question includes 100 drilled gas wells, all located on Mount Hiriya and connected to the collection and piping system which leads the gas (approximately 1,200 cubic meters) to the Office Textile plant located nearby. In fact, the entire energy consumption of the fabric finishing plant is generated by this gas. The project is also the first project to receive UN approval and authorization for trading in greenhouse gases under auspices of the Clean Development Mechanism of the Kyoto Protocol (CDM).

== Political career ==
Sapir was elected to the Tel Aviv – Jaffa City Council in 1989, was a member of the municipality managing board, and served as chairman of the preservation committee. Since 1996 he has been serving as first deputy mayor and since 2002 as chairman of the Municipal Urban Planning and building committee. Sapir was behind simplification of the procedures required for the obtainment of building permits and led the decision to approve the Tel Aviv – Jaffa Master plan in 2012. In 2023 Sapir decided not to run again for another term at Tel Aviv Municipality and to move to the privet Sector in March 2024.
