= Ayalon River =

Coordinates: 32°2′23.26″N 34°47′45.03″E

Ayalon River Nahr el-Barideh, Wadi Musrara (in Arabic)
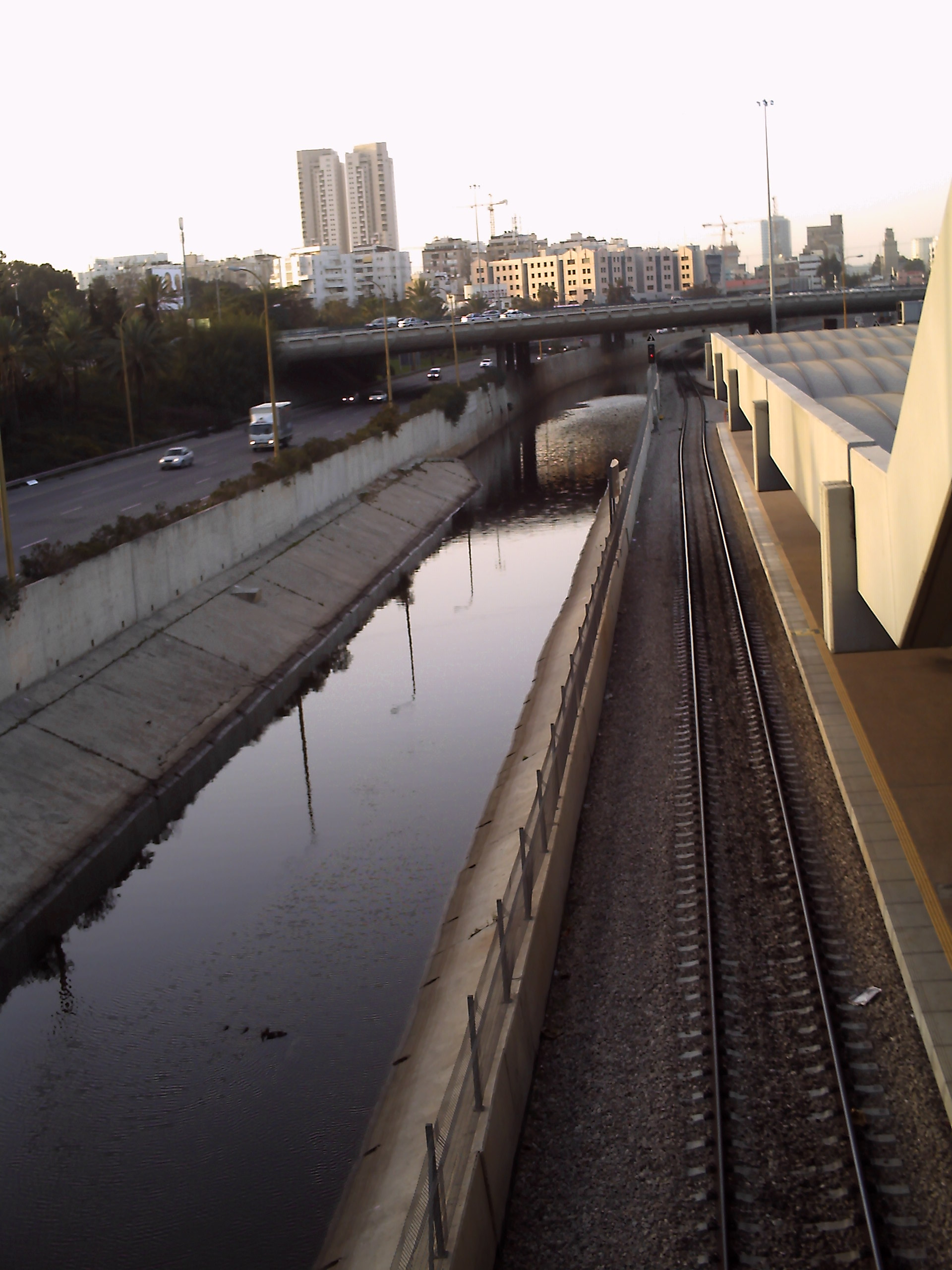
- The Ayalon River between Tel Aviv and Ramat Gan

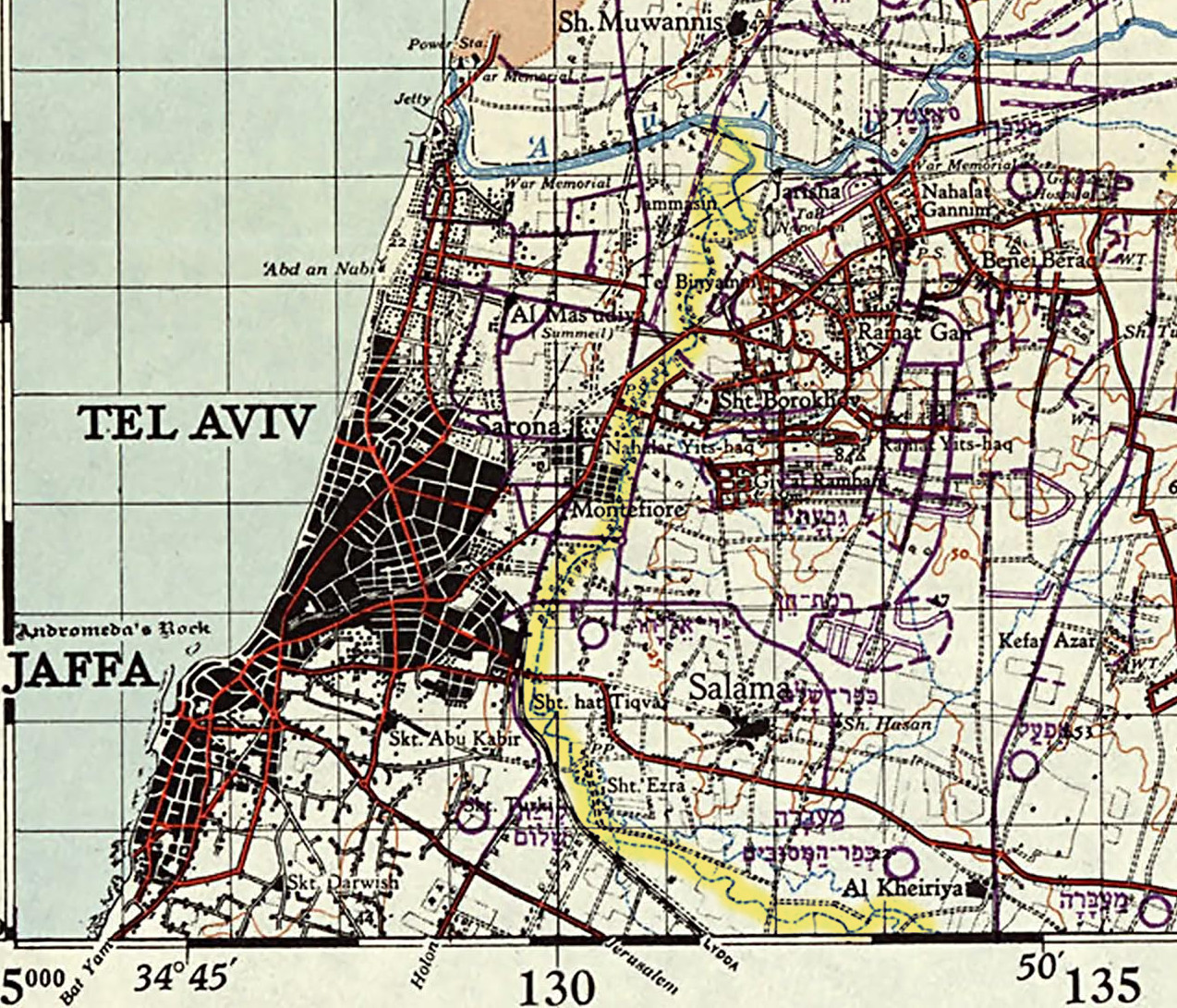
- The historic course of Ayalon in the area of Tel Aviv, which had later been converted to Ayalon Highway
- Etymology: Driving from the Hebrew root for tree
- Native name: נחל איילון (Hebrew)

Location
- Country: Israel
- Region: Central Israel
- Cities: Lod, Ramat Gan, Tel Aviv

Physical characteristics
- Source: Giv'at Ze'ev
- Mouth
  - location: Yarqon
- Length: 50 km (31 mi)
- Basin size: 815 km^{2} (315 sq mi)

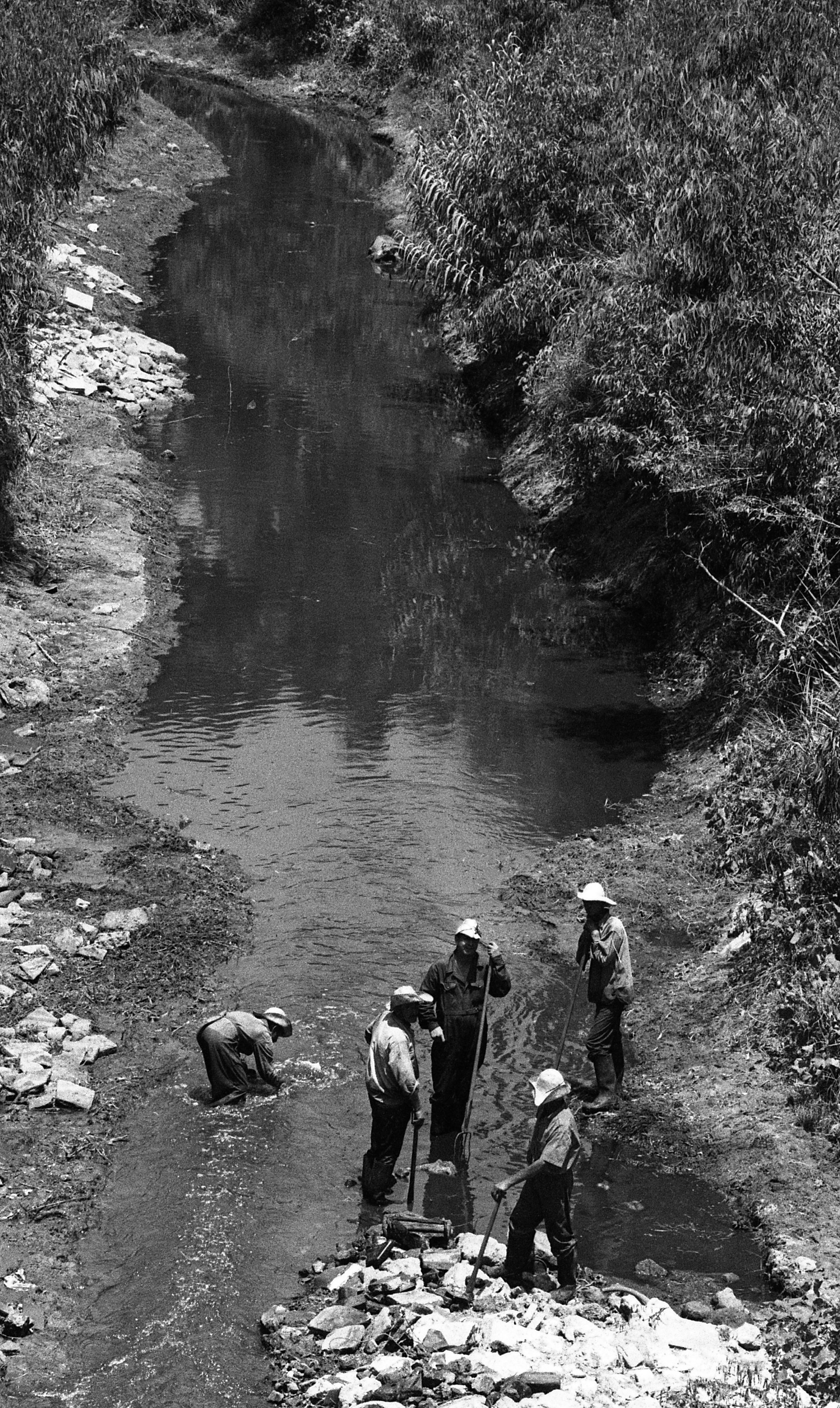
Cleaning the Musrara (Ayalon) River, 1969

The Ayalon River (Hebrew: נחל איילון, Nahal Ayalon), Nahr el-Barideh or Wadi Musrara (وادي المصرارة) in Arabic, is a perennial stream in Israel, originating in the Judean Hills and discharging into the Yarkon River in the area of Tel Aviv.

The total length of the Ayalon River is about 50 kilometres and it drains an area of 815 square kilometres. It begins in the Judean Hills northwest of Jerusalem near the West Bank Israeli settlements of Giv'at Ze'ev and Giv'on HaHadasha, flows down through the Ayalon Valley of the Shephelah region, reaches the Coastal Plain and passes near Ben Gurion Airport, is diverted from its original bed through an artificial concrete channel along the north–south Ayalon Freeway bordering central Tel Aviv on the east, and discharges into the Yarkon River in the Bavli quarter of Tel Aviv.

East of Tel Aviv the Ayalon passes through the grounds of the new Ariel Sharon Park, a grand project centered on the former Hiriya waste dump and since 2004 one of the biggest environmental rehabilitation projects in the world, designed by the German landscape architect Peter Latz and planned to be finalised by 2020.

== See also ==
- List of rivers of Israel
  - Wadi Natuf/Nahal Natuf, tributary of the Ayalon holding significant prehistoric site
- Musrara/Morasha, neighborhood in Jerusalem
