= Jerusalem Metro =

Planned subway system around Jerusalem

Jerusalem Metro is a proposed rapid transit system with underground metro lines for Greater Jerusalem. It is intended to complement the existing Jerusalem Light Rail and alleviate traffic congestion in the city.

== History ==
The Ministry of Transport, through the transport master plan team, which oversees construction of transport infrastructure in Jerusalem in conjunction with the Jerusalem Municipality and the Ministry of Transport, completed a strategic study concluding that 2-3 underground metro lines will be needed in Jerusalem that will complement the light rail network. A tender for preliminary planning and a feasibility study for metro lines has been issued on 1 July 2024 by the transport master plan team. This design work is to be completed by the end of 2026. The rationale for the publishing of the tender is that the city's light rail network will be reaching capacity by 2030.

If approved and budgeted, construction will only start in 2040–2050. Estimates are that the cost of the project will amount to tens of billions of shekels.

== Routes ==
The first line will be proposed from southeast Jerusalem to Pisgat Ze'ev in the north; and the second line from southwest Jerusalem to the Old City, with two alternatives for extensions to East Jerusalem. Both lines might have interchange stations at the city entrance and the government precinct.

== See also ==
- Jerusalem Light Rail
- Tel Aviv Metro
