= Bavli =

Neighborhood in Tel Aviv, Israel

Coordinates: 32°5′47.4″N 34°47′53.47″E

Bavli בבלי
- Neighborhood of Tel Aviv
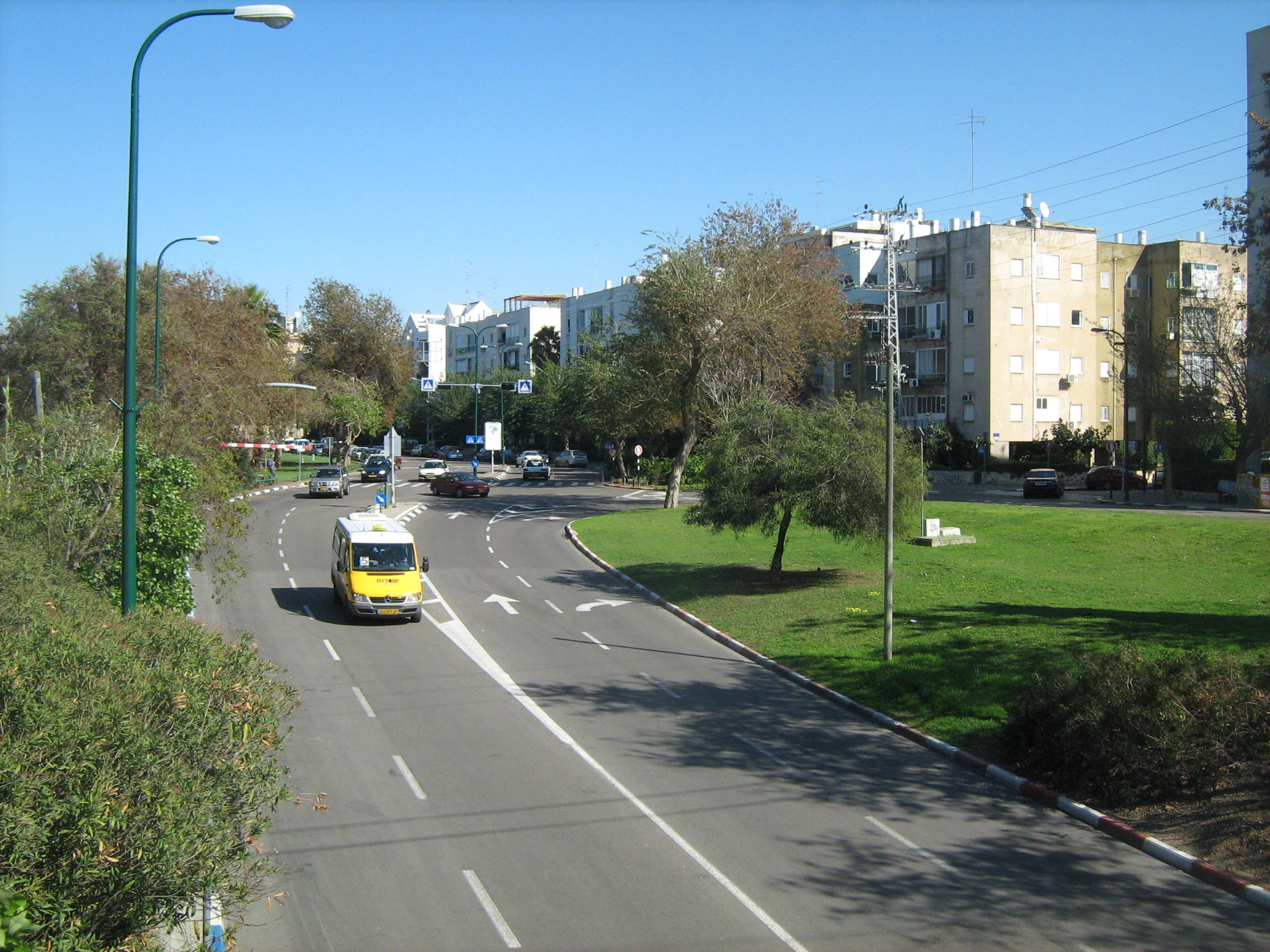
- Shkun Bavli
- Interactive map of Bavli
- Country: Israel
- City: Tel Aviv

Bavli (Hebrew: בבלי), or Shikun Bavli, is a neighborhood in central Tel Aviv, Israel, named after the Babylonian Talmud, and bounded by Yarkon Park on the north, Ayalon highway to the east, Namir road to the west, and Park Tzameret to the south.

== History ==
=== Establishment ===
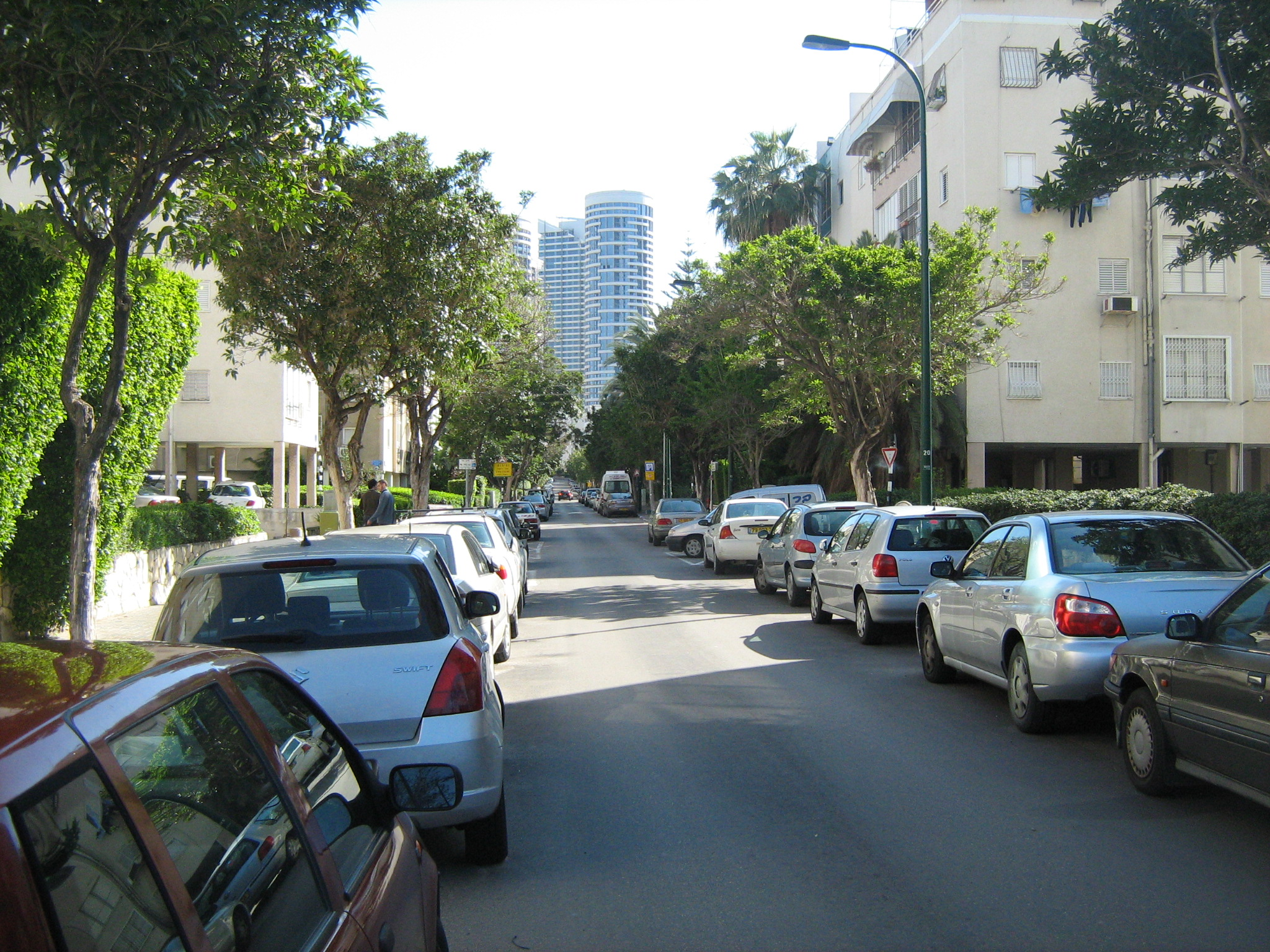
Hazohar Street in the neighbourhood.

Before the 1948 Palestine war, the land was part of the Arab village of Al-Jammasin al-Gharbi. In 1948, the Tel Aviv municipality housed Jewish refugees from nearby battle zones in the village's houses, and over time, the built-up area of the village became the Givat Amal B neighbourhood. The land was transferred to the Israel Land Administration and the Tel Aviv municipality under the Absentees' Property Law. The Bavli neighbourhood began in 1957 as a public housing project. Two blocks, with dozens of apartments, were constructed far from the Namir Road, on Bavel and Tosefta Streets. Without an entering bus line, the first residents had to walk through sand and mud to reach their homes. On 22 January 1956, the municipality decided to level and turn Herzog Street (then Yehuda HaMakabi) from Haifa Road to Bavli Street into a dirt road, and Bavli Street from Yehuda HaMakabi to Jerusalem Street. On 2 May 1956, the municipality decided to pave Bavel Street between Yerushalmi Street and Knesset HaGadol Street. On 30 December 1956, the municipality decided to pave the section of Bavli Street between Herzog Street (then Yehuda HaMakabi) and Yerushalmi Street. In 1958, the municipality approved the expansion of the neighbourhood towards Givat Amal. In mid-1959, the neighbourhood still had a small population, so there was no need for a polling station for elections, but one was still set up due to its distance from other areas.

At the time, the houses were not connected to the municipal sewage network, causing sewage to flow into the Yarkon River. The residents suffered from foul odors from the Yarkon, which they attributed to sewage coming from Petah Tikva and Ramat Gan. In 1959, groups of residents from the housing project were brought to trial for polluting the Yarkon River in an attempt to pressure them to connect their homes to the sewage system.

=== Expansion ===
In early 1963, the municipality decided to pave Knesset HaGadol and Mishneh Streets with asphalt, east of Tosefta Street. In the mid-1960s, construction companies discovered the area due to its relatively low land prices and began widespread construction. The building quality was relatively high, with four-story buildings and larger apartments with elevators and attached parking spaces. The neighbourhood developed in terms of city connectivity and local service provision. In the late 1960s, the Dekel Center was established with 100 apartments, a commercial center with 17 shops, and a Dekel cinema with about 1,000 seats. On 12 March 1967, the city council decided to asphalt the remaining streets of the neighbourhood that had not yet been paved. On 19 May 1968, the city council decided to widen Yehuda HaMakabi Street and Bavli Street.

In the mid-1980s, the southern part (Pa'amoni Street) was built to even higher standards, and the neighbourhood maintained its distinct character as a small neighbourhood for middle-to-high-class residents, although many families moved to more northern areas that offered larger apartments and taller residential towers. In the first decade of the 21st century, construction in the neighbourhood focused on luxury residential buildings overlooking the Ayalon River.

Due to its proximity to both the city center and the park, it is considered a mostly upper middle class neighbourhood, with a majority of older couples and families living within the area. The Jerusalem Post has called Bavli "one of the most iconic quarters of Tel Aviv", due in part to its enclosed nature.

On its eastern border, the Ayalon River flows through an artificial channel along the Ayalon Freeway, diverted from its natural bed as a preventive measure against floods. It used to flow into the Mediterranean Sea north of Jaffa, but now, it discharges into the Yarkon River at the northeastern corner of the Bavli Quarter.

== Gallery ==
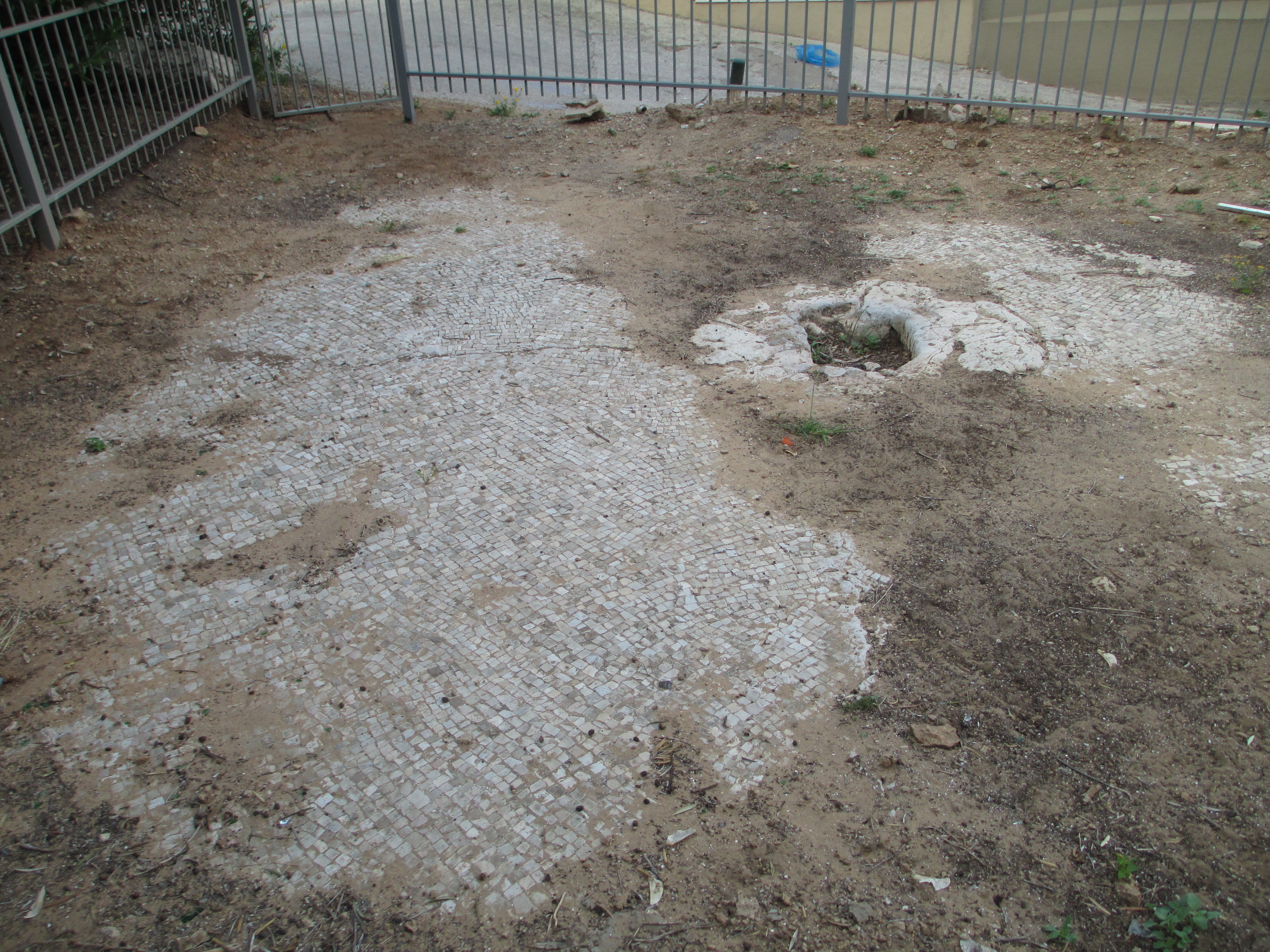
Byzantine wine press in the neighbourhood

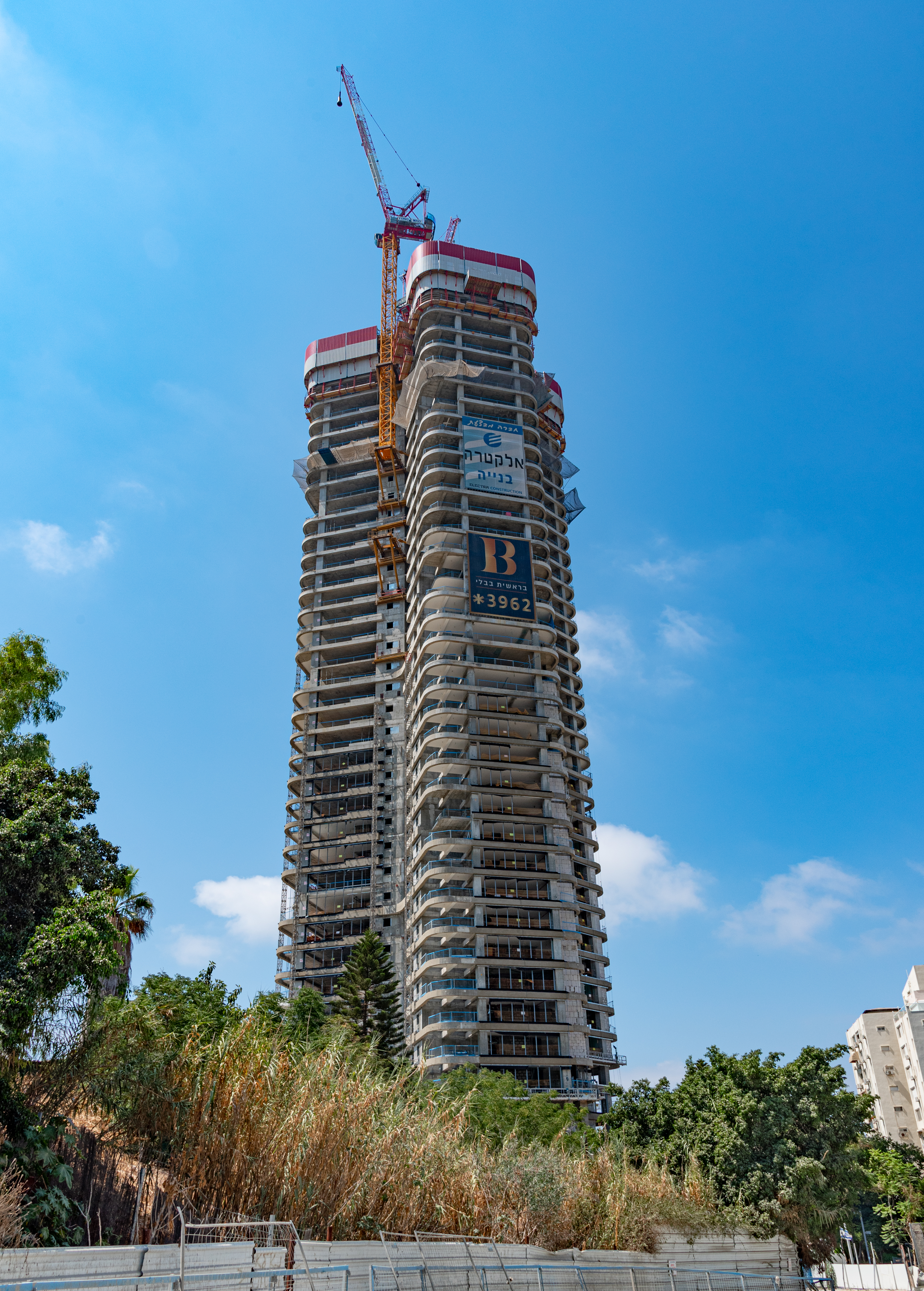
The Bereishit tower in the neighbourhood

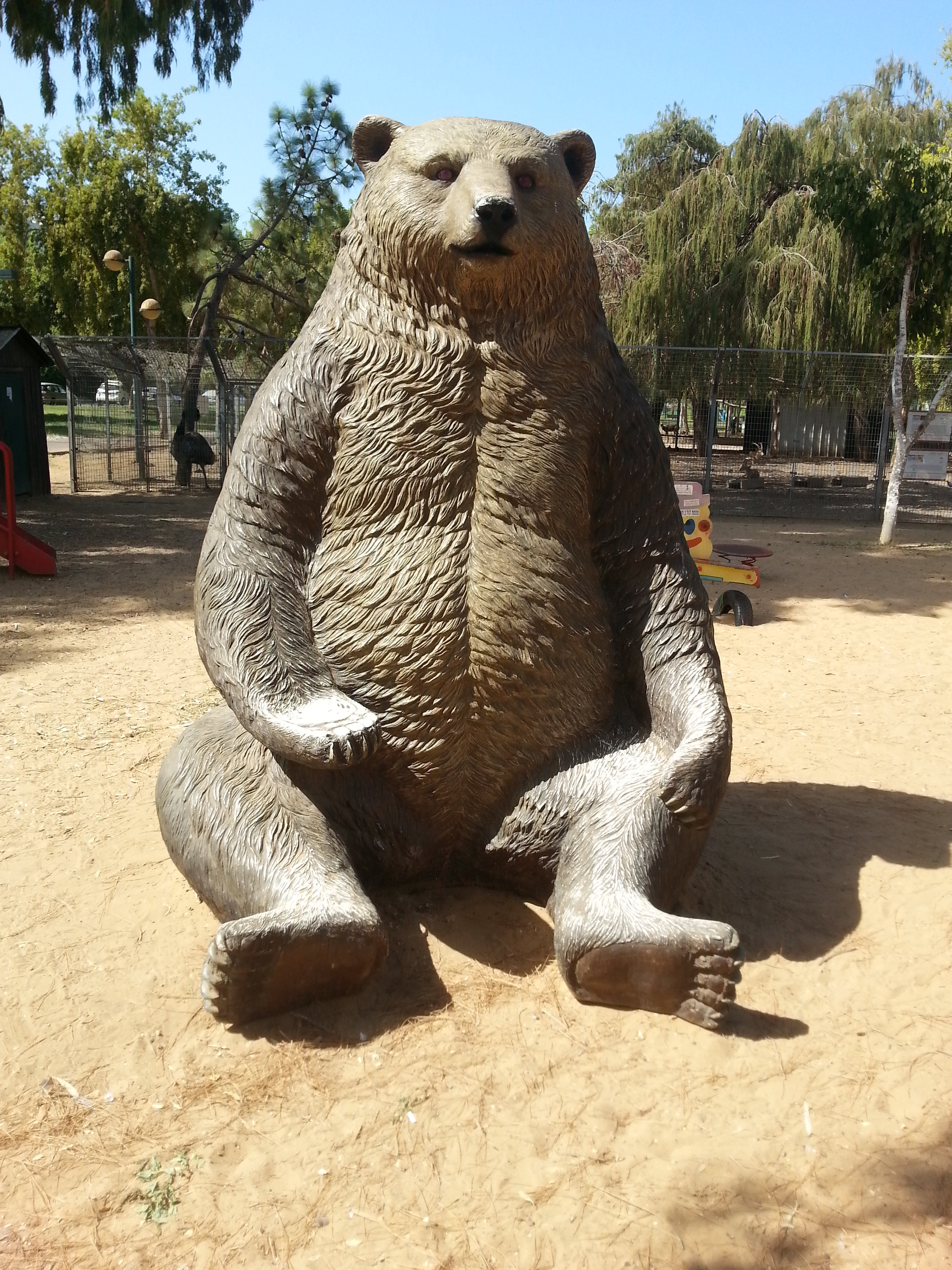
A bear sculpture in the neighbourhood

== See also ==
- History of Tel Aviv
