= Highway 20 (Israel) =

Intracity freeway in Israel

Coordinates: 32°02′15″N 34°45′52″E

Highway 20
- כביש 20
- Ayalon Highway; Hebrew: נתיבי איילון, romanized: Netivei Ayalon
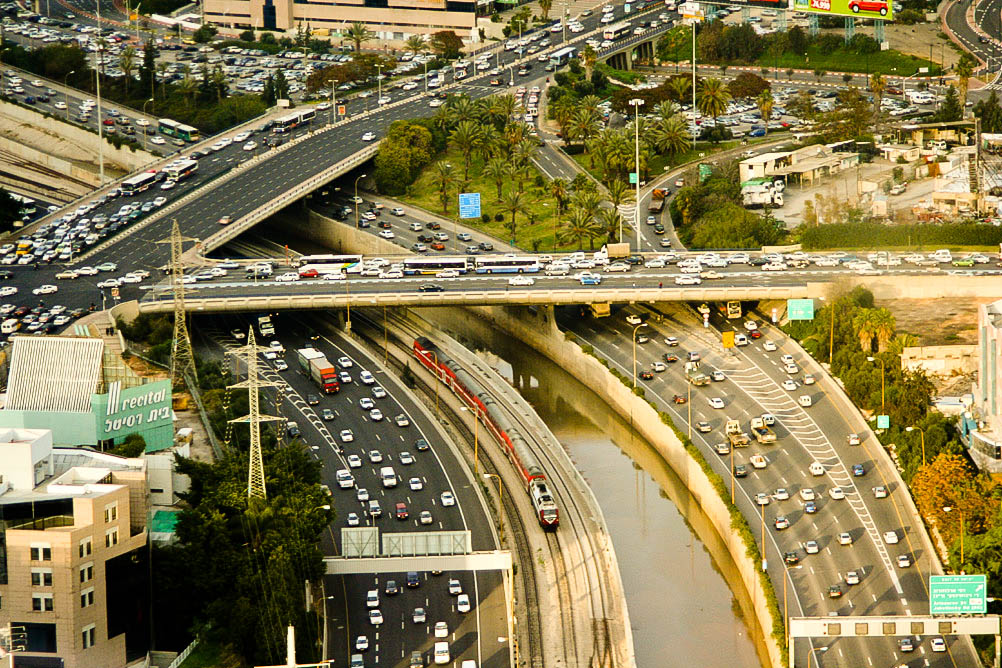
- Arlozorov Interchange

Route information
- Length: 29 km (18 mi)

Major junctions
- South end: Rishon LeZion (Holot Interchange)
- Holon Interchange; Kibbutz Galuyot Interchange; La Guardia Interchange; Glilot Interchange
- North end: Ga'ash

Location
- Country: Israel
- Major cities: Holon, Herzliya, Bat Yam, Tel Aviv, Givatayim, Ramat Gan

Highway system
- Roads in Israel; Highways
← Highway 16	→ Highway 22

Highway 20, more commonly known as the Ayalon Highway, or simply Ayalon (Hebrew: נתיבי איילון, pronounced: Netivei Ayalon, lit. "Ayalon lanes"), is a major inter city freeway in Gush Dan, Israel. The road runs along the eastern border of central Tel Aviv from north to south and connects all of the major highways leading to the city—such as Highway 4 from Ashdod and the Southern regions, Highway 2 from Haifa and the Northern regions, Highway 5 from the East, and Highway 1 from Jerusalem and the Southeast. The Ayalon Highway is heavily used; on an average day, almost 600,000 vehicles enter the freeway. It consists of a multi-lane highway with a multi-track railway located between the opposite travel lanes. Some of the highway's route is along the Ayalon River, hence its name. It is made of primarily asphalt.

== Background ==
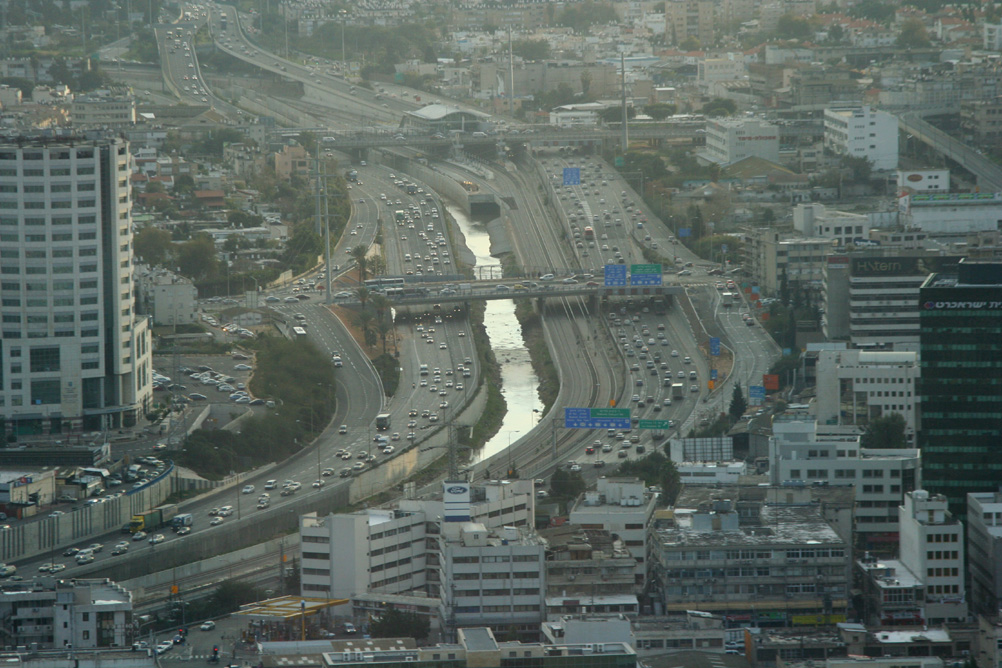
Laguardia Interchange

Before the construction of the Ayalon Highway, all the major inter-city highways leading to Tel Aviv terminated in the outskirts of the city. This created major traffic congestion at the entry and exit points and made driving through the city difficult. Moreover, before the highway, Tel Aviv had two separate railway stations, one in the north and one in the south, which were not connected. Thus, passengers who wanted to travel to the South of the country could only do so from the southern station and those who wanted to travel to the North could only do so from the northern (Central) station. Even worse, trains from the northern part of the country could not travel to the southern part of the country without bypassing Tel Aviv from the east, making train travel in Israel challenging. Finally, there was the problem of the Ayalon River, which went through parts of Tel Aviv and would sometimes cause flooding.

To solve these problems, as early as the 1950s, ideas were raised regarding using the route of the river as a transportation corridor, but it wasn't until the mid-1960s that the government began planning. In the 1970s a government-owned company, Ayalon Highways Ltd., was set up to construct the highway. The first phase included the construction of a concrete channel for the Ayalon River to alleviate the flooding problem. In 1982, the first section of the road opened, and, in 1991, the final section of the central part of the road was completed. This section connects Highway 1 in the south with Highway 5 and Highway 2 in the north through the very center of the Gush Dan metropolitan area. The Ayalon Railway section of the Coastal Railway and four stations were built in the center of the highway, which provided for the long-sought connection of Israel's railway network through Tel Aviv.

In the early 1990s, the construction of a southern section of the highway had started. This section goes from Tel Aviv HaHagana railway station through the southern Tel Aviv suburbs of Holon, Bat Yam and Rishon LeZion and connects to Highway 4 north of Yavne. After the highway splits with the Ayalon River at Highway 1, it goes on the route of a road called Heyl HaShiryon Road (דרך חיל השריון, "The Armored Corps Road"), then on the route of Yigael Yadin Road until Wolfson Interchange, where it goes on the route of Yigal Allon Road (דרך יגאל אלון).

Previously, the northern terminus of the road was in Herzliya, but in January 2019 it was extended further north to near the kibbutz of Shefayim, where it has another connection to Highway 2 built as part of the Route 531 construction project.

== Impact ==
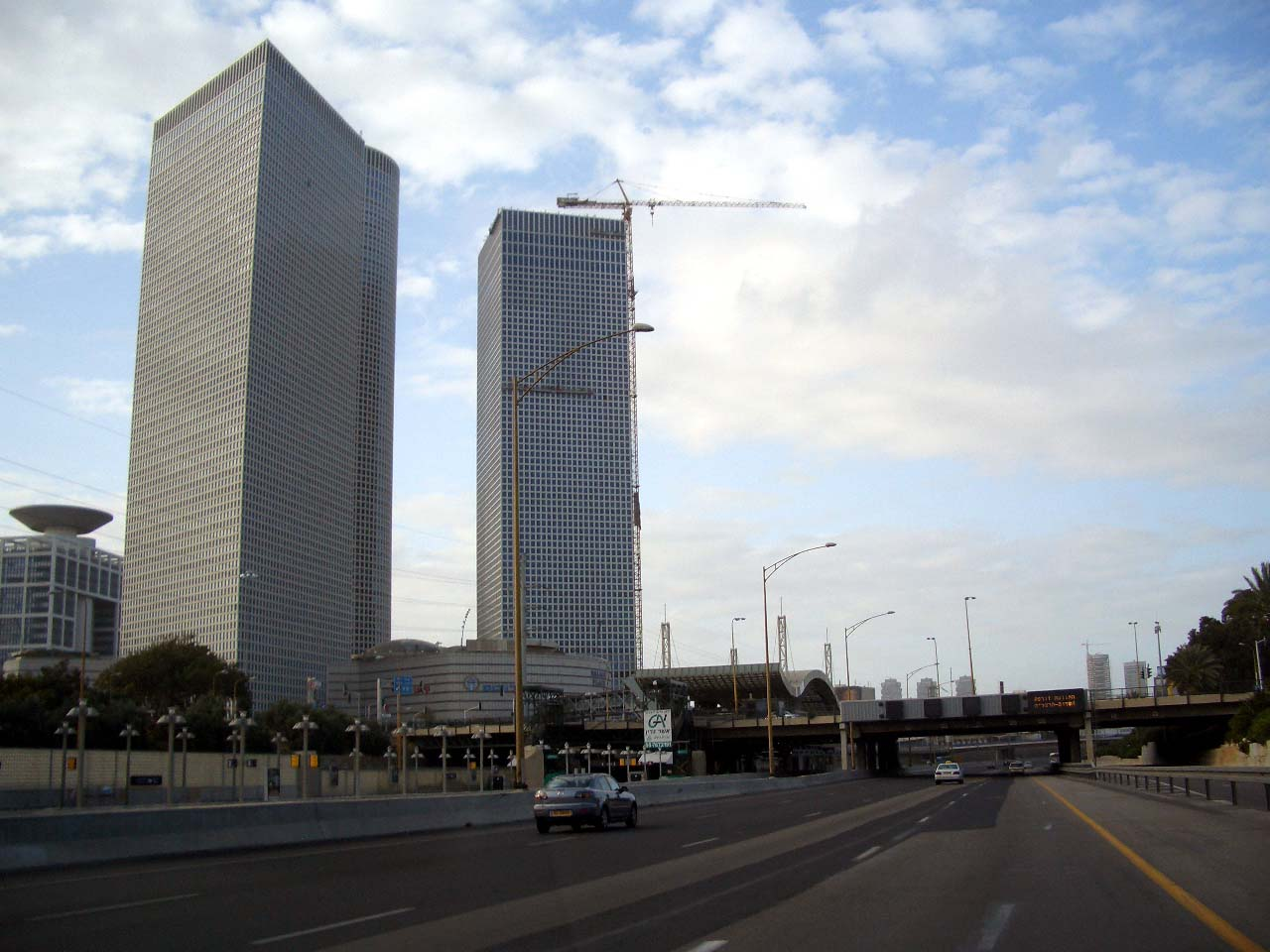
Near HaShalom Interchange

The road and railway had a major impact on the Tel Aviv region. While quite congested at times it nevertheless alleviated traveling to and through Tel Aviv. Considerable real estate development of offices, shopping, and housing occurred along the route, so much so, that Tel Aviv's Central Business District lost much of its importance as many businesses relocated to near the road. Israel Railways saw huge increases in passenger numbers now that north/south trains could travel through Tel Aviv instead of around it.

== Plans ==
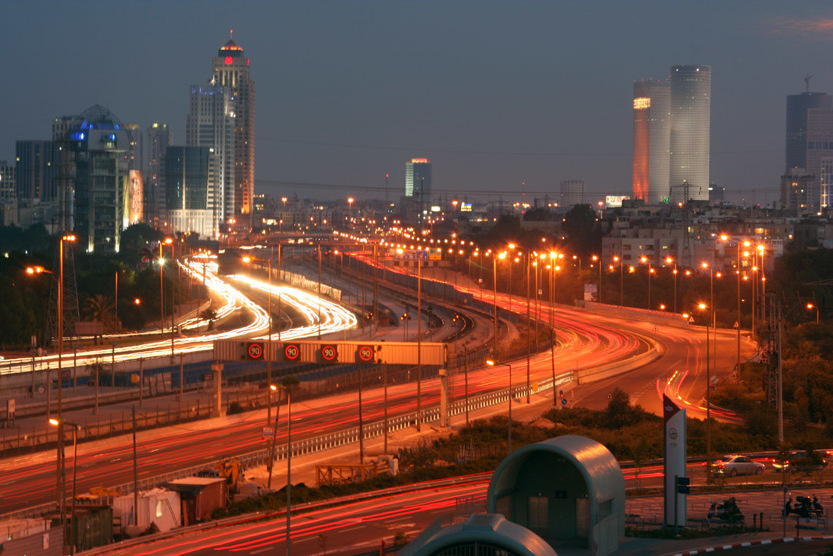
Near Rokach Interchange

The southern part of the highway (i.e., the section passing through the Holon, Bat Yam and Rishon LeZion suburbs) was completed in 2012, including a second overpass in the Holon interchange and dual track railroad and six stations in the median of the highway (as part of a project which extended the Coastal Railway to Ashdod). An east-west branch "Ayalon East", from Highway 4 to the Tel Aviv University railway station along the path of the Yarkon River has been planned, but is still not approved.

The central section of the road is built along the banks of the Ayalon River. However, Israel Railways is in desperate need of adding a fourth railroad track in that area and no space exists to do so but "on top" of the river itself. Over the decades several suggestions have been made to solve this problem, ranging from diverting the entire river through Jaffa to building an elevated highway, to creating a man-made lake for capturing flooding overflow south of the city and burying the river in a large diameter pipe and constructing the railway on top of it. In 2018 a plan was finally approved to undertake a multi-billion Shekel project to add the fourth track although construction is not expected to commence until the early 2020s decade.

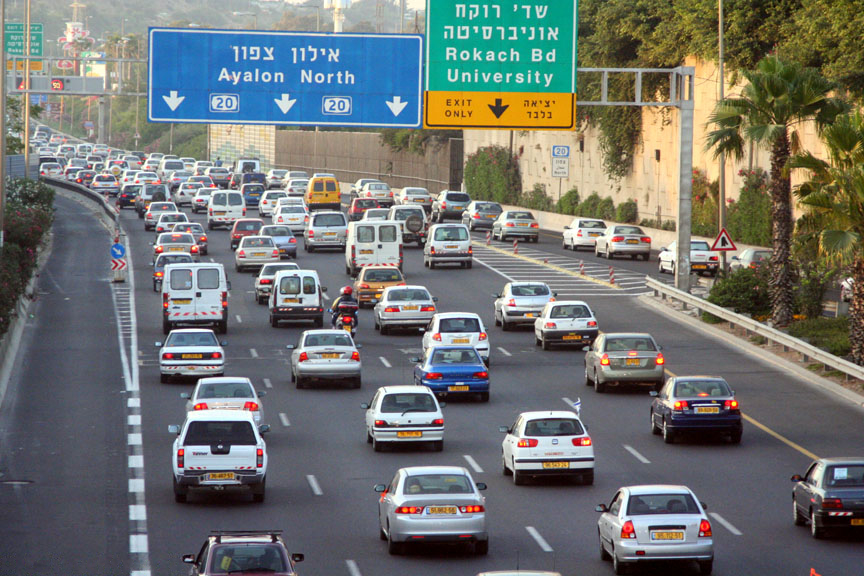
Heavy Afternoon Traffic

Under construction as of 2020 are HOV lanes extending nearly the entire length of the Highway, together with large park & ride facilities located in the approaches to the Gush Dan region. These parking facilities will be served by free express public shuttle buses which will ferry passengers from the parking lots to various locations inside the Gush Dan metropolitan area via the new HOV lanes.

The long-term projection is for Route 20 to run as far north as Hadera. However, this has garnered very strong opposition from environmental groups, since the road would have to cross a nature preserve and other sensitive environmental areas. These groups suggest widening Highway 2 (the so-called "Coastal Highway"), an existing freeway north of Tel Aviv which roughly parallels (several kilometres to the west) Route 20's future route, instead of extending Route 20 northwards.

== Interchanges (South to North) ==
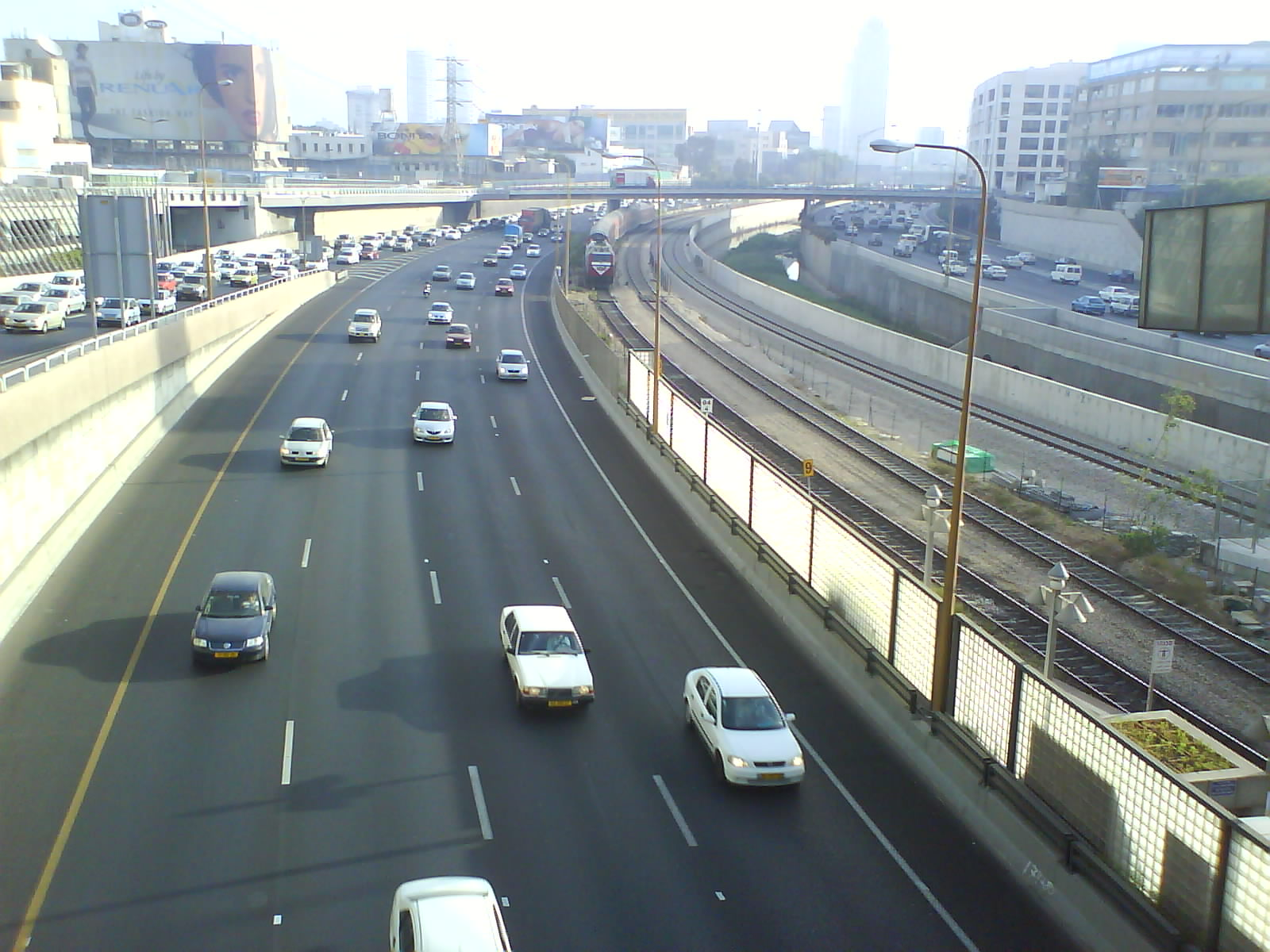
Near HaShalom railway station

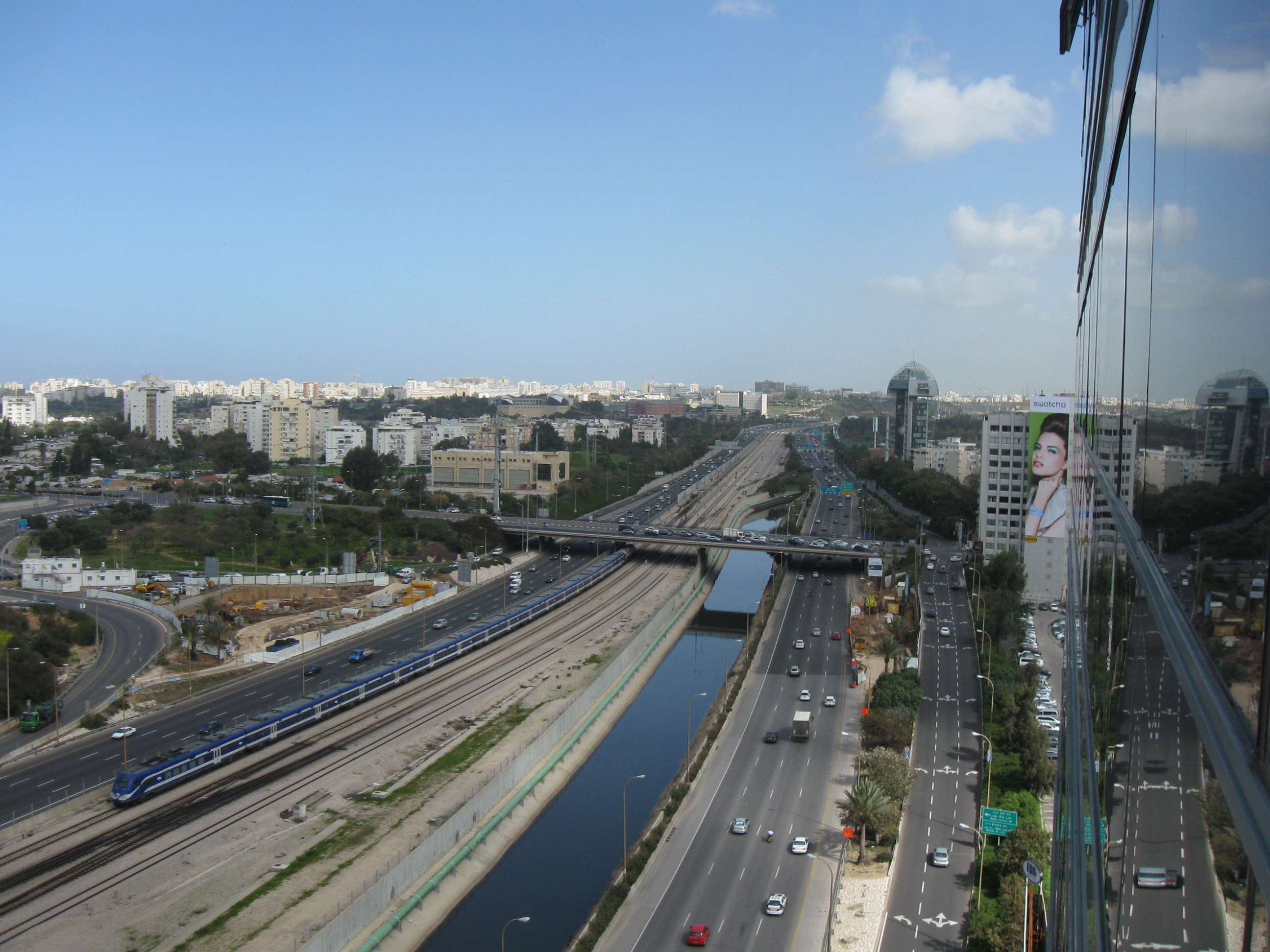
North of Arlozorov Interchange

List of interchanges in order from the southernmost at Gan Sorek to the northernmost at Ga'ash:

District	Location	km	mi	Name	Destinations	Notes
Central	Gan Sorek	0	0.0	מחלף חולות (Holot Interchange)	Highway 4	
Central	Rishon LeZion	1	0.62	מחלף מבוא איילון (Mevo Ayalon Interchange)	Route 431	
Central	Rishon LeZion	3.5	2.2	מחלף משה דיין (Moshe Dayan Interchange)	Route 441	Named after Moshe Dayan
Tel Aviv	Bat Yam; Holon	5	3.1	מחלף קוממיות (Komemiyut Interchange)	HaKomemiyut Street	
Tel Aviv	Bat Yam; Holon	6.5	4.0	מחלף יוספטל (Yoseftal Interchange)	Yoseftal Blvd.	Named after Giora Yoseftal
Tel Aviv	Bat Yam; Holon	7.5	4.7	מחלף דב הוז (Dov Hoz Interchange)	Dov Hoz Blvd.	Named after Dov Hoz
Tel Aviv	Holon; Tel Aviv	9	5.6	מחלף וולפסון (Wolfson Interchange)	Heinrich Heine Street	Named after nearby Wolfson Medical Center
Tel Aviv	Holon	12	7.5	מחלף חולון (Holon Interchange)	Highway 44	
Tel Aviv	HaTikva	13	8.1	מחלף חיל השריון (Heil HaShiryon Interchange)	Highway 2	
Tel Aviv	HaTikva	13.2	8.2	מחלף קיבוץ גלויות (Kibbutz Galuyot Interchange)	Highway 1; Highway 2; Route 461	
Tel Aviv	HaTikva	14	8.7	מחלף לה גוורדייה (LaGuardia Interchange)	Laguardia Street	Named after Fiorello LaGuardia
Tel Aviv	Nahalat Yitzhak	16	9.9	מחלף השלום (Peace Interchange)	HaShalom Road	
Tel Aviv	Nahalat Yitzhak	17	11	מחלף ארלוזורוב (Arlozorov Interchange)	Route 481; Arlozorov Street	Named after Arlozorov
Tel Aviv	Bavli	17.5	10.9	מחלף ההלכה (HaHalakha Interchange)	HaRav Shlomo Goren Street	
Tel Aviv	Shikun Lamed	19	12	מחלף רוקח (Rokach Interchange)	Rokach Blvd.	Named after Israel Rokach
Tel Aviv	Afeka	21	13	מחלף קק"ל (KKL Interchange)	Keren Kayemet LeYisrael Blvd.	
Tel Aviv	Ramat HaSharon	23	14	מחלף גלילות מזרח (East Glilot Interchange)	Highway 5 Highway 2	Named after the location of former Jewish refugee camp Glilot
Tel Aviv	Herzliya	25.5	15.8	מחלף שבעת הכוכבים (The Seven Stars Interchange)	Route 541	
Tel Aviv	Kfar Shmaryahu	29	18	מחלף המעפילים (HaMa'apailim Interchange)	Menachem Begin Blvd.	
Central	Rishpon	30.6	19.0	מחלף שמריהו מזרח (East Shmaryahu Interchange)	Route 531	
Central	Ga'ash	34.6	21.5	מחלף רשפון – געש (Rishpon – Ga'ash Interchange)	Highway 2	
1.000 mi = 1.609 km; 1.000 km = 0.621 mi

Railway stations are located nearby the following interchanges (with station name in parentheses, if differs from interchange name): Shiv'at HaKochavim (Herzliyya), Rokach (University), Arlozorov (Tel Aviv Central), HaShalom, Kibbutz Galuyot (HaHagana), Holon, Wolfson, Yoseftal, Komemiyut, Moshe Dayan.
