= Ofnidan =

Network of long-distance bicycle paths in the Tel Aviv Metropolitan Area

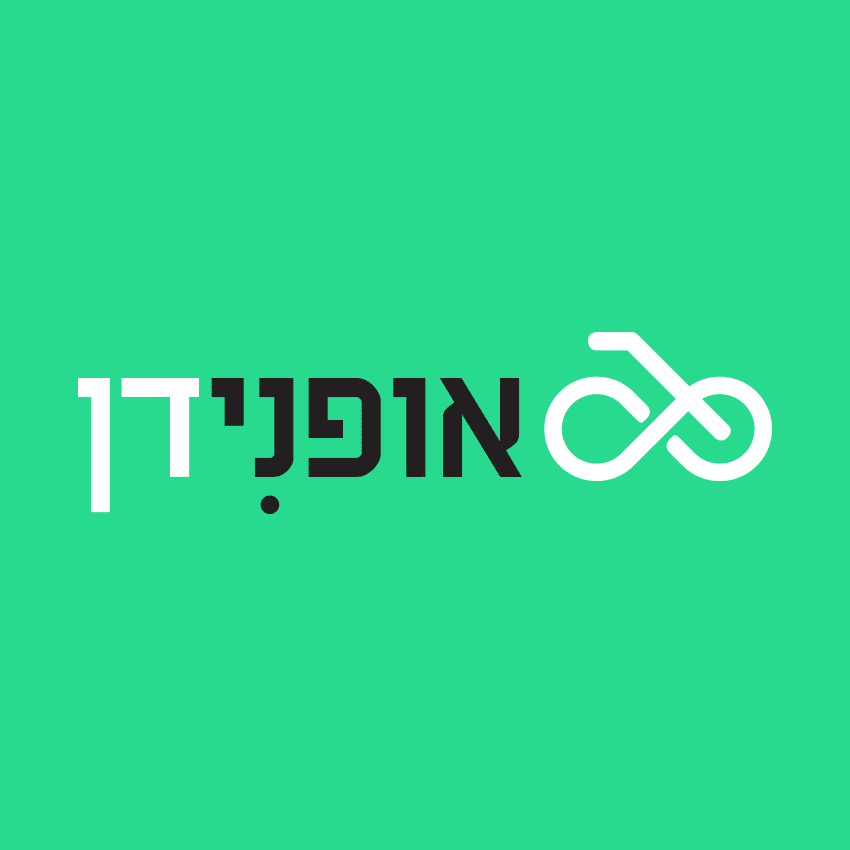
- Ofnidan logo
- Location: Gush Dan, Israel
- Proposer: Ministry of Transportation
- Status: Under construction, partially opened
- Type: Cycling infrastructure

Ofnidan (Hebrew: אופנידן), or the Greater Tel Aviv Cycle Network, and sometimes transliterated from Hebrew as Ofneidan, is an infrastructure project under construction to establish a network of long-distance bike paths in Gush Dan, Israel's largest conurbation and metropolitan area. The network will connect residential areas and employment centers and reduce the use of motorized private transport and the resulting congestion and pollution. The project was first announced in 2015, and the plan originally included more than 145 kilometers of segregated bike paths.

== Routes ==
The network consists of seven routes.

Routes of the Ofnidan Cycle Network
| Route | Colour code | Length | Areas served |
|---|---|---|---|
| Ayalon Route | Yellow | 14 km | Begins at the College of Management in Rishon LeZion and ends at Ben-Zvi Road in Tel Aviv, connecting the cities of Rishon LeZion, Holon, Bat Yam and Tel Aviv. Important locations along the route include the College of Management, Moshe Dayan railway station, the Golden Mall in Rishon LeZion, Bat Yam–Komemiyut and Bat Yam–Yoseftal railway stations, the Bat Yam and Holon Malls, the Holon–Wolfson railway station and Wolfson Medical Center. |
| Yarkon Route | Pink | 19 km | Begins at the Rosh HaAyin North railway station and ends at the Savidor railway station, connecting the cities of Rosh HaAyin, Petah Tikva, Bnei Brak, Ramat Gan and Tel Aviv. Important landmarks on the route include Park Afek in Rosh HaAyin, Savidor Central Railway Station in Tel Aviv, HaMoshava Stadium in Petah Tikva, Ayalon Mall in Ramat Gan, the Tel Aviv Stock Exchange and Shenkar College of Engineering and Design. |
| Coastal Route | Green | 14 km | Begins at Reichman University and ends at the Savidor railway station, connecting the cities of Herzliya, Ramat HaSharon and Tel Aviv. Important landmarks on the route include Herzliya railway station, Seven Stars Mall, Glilot, Levinsky College, Kibbutzim College of Education, Technology and the Arts, Tel Aviv University and the Tel Aviv Museum. |
| Holot Route | Purple | 7 km | Connects Rishon LeZion, Holon and Tel Aviv. The route starts at the Golden Mall in Rishon LeZion and reaches Ben Zvi Road in Tel Aviv. Important landmarks on the route include the Holon Institute of Technology, Design Museum Holon, Meditech Holon, Park HaHorshot and the Tel Aviv-Jaffa Academic College. |
| Ariel Sharon Park Route | Red | 14 km | Begins in the Nahalat Yehuda neighborhood of Rishon Lezion and reaches Derech HaShalom in Tel Aviv. It connects Rishon LeZion, Holon, Azor, Ariel Sharon Park, Ramat Gan and Tel Aviv. |
| Sadeh Route | Blue | 14 km | Connects Petach Tikva, Giv'at Shmuel, Kiryat Ono, Ramat Gan and Tel Aviv-Jaffa. The route begins at the interchange Amishav-Highway 471 and reaches the bridge Judith Yitzhak Sadeh Street in Tel Aviv-Jaffa. Among the important landmarks on the route are Bar-Ilan University and Yehudit Bridge. |
| Sharon Route | Orange | 16 km | Connects the Herzliya, Ramat HaSharon, Yarkon Park and Tel Aviv. The route begins at the intersection of Ra'anana Herzliya east, Highway 531 and reaches the Savidor railway station in Tel Aviv. Among the important landmarks on the route are the HaKfar HaYarok, Afeka College of Engineering, and Yarkon Park. |

== Specifications ==
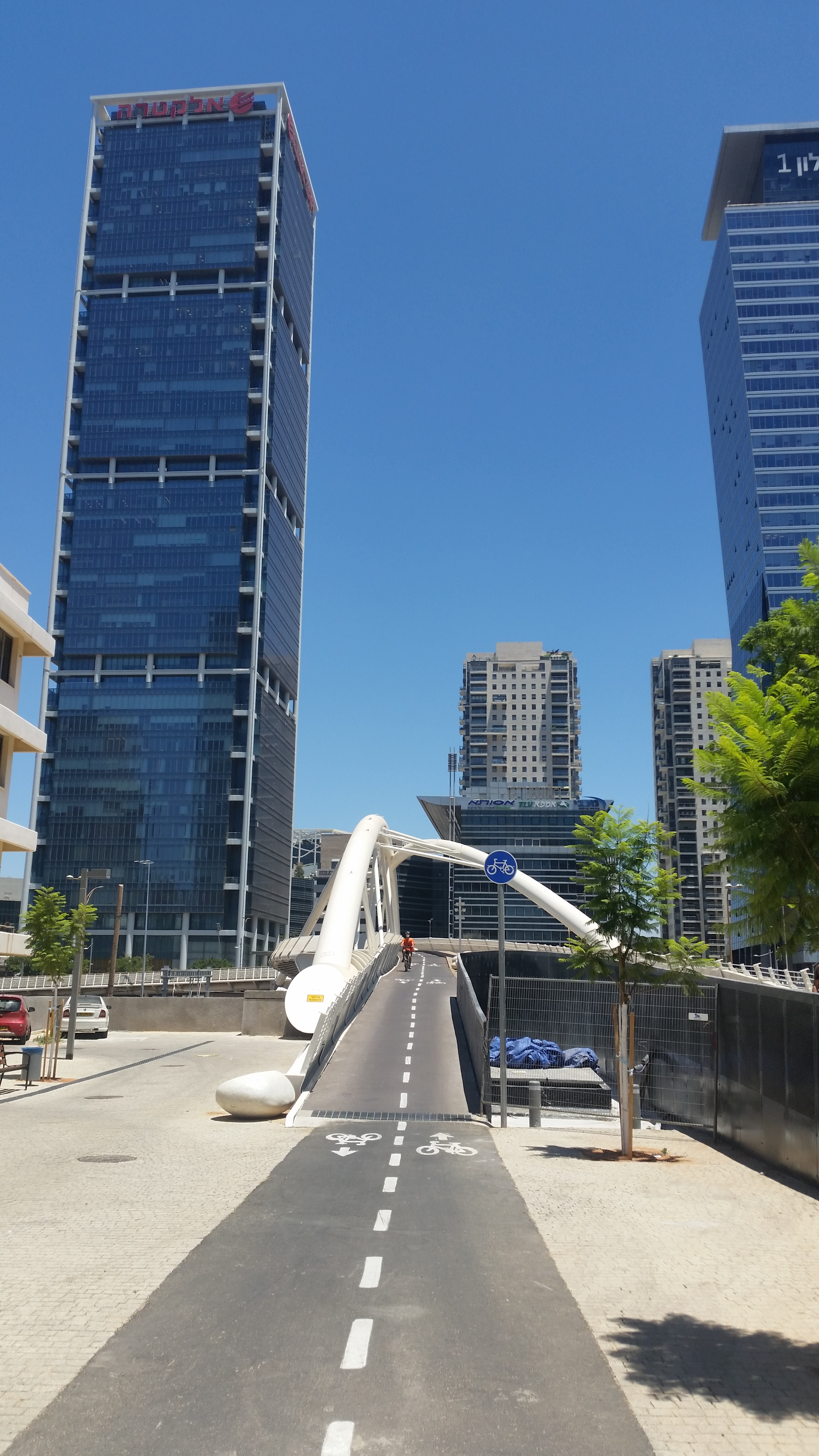
The Field Route crosses Yehudit Bridge in Tel Aviv-Jaffa

The planned bike paths will be at least three meters wide, with bridges facilitating rapid and safe crossing of high-speed roads, where necessary. There will also be resting places, water fountains, maps, and appropriate signage.

== Controversy ==
In March 2021, Ynet reported that just six months after an opening ceremony by the Minister for Transport, a section of the bikeway between the Moshe Dayan and Komemiyot highway interchanges was ripped up and closed to commuters with fences. The Ministry of Transportation claimed a detour was paved, but a visit to the site showed no such detour nor any signage indicating a detour, according to the report.
