= Tzvika Brot =

Israeli politician

- צביקה ברוט
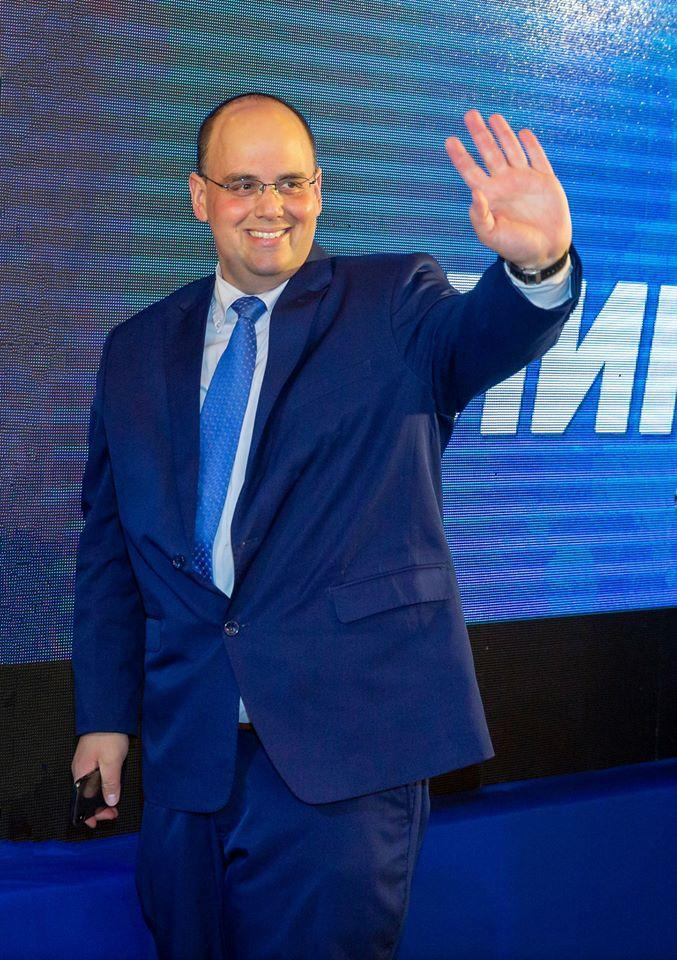
- Tzvika Brot

Mayor of Bat Yam
- Incumbent
- Assumed office 2018
- Preceded by: Yossi Bachar

Personal details
- Born: 5 May 1980 (age 46) Bat Yam, Israel
- Party: Likud
- Education: Ono Academic College

Tzvika Brot (Hebrew: צביקה ברוט; born May 5, 1980) is the mayor of Bat Yam, Israel. He is a strategic advisor and former senior correspondent for Army Radio and Yedioth Ahronoth.

== Biography ==
Tzvika Brot was born and raised in Bat Yam, the youngest son of Tova and David Brot. His father headed the Bat Yam municipal education department until his retirement. His mother was a special education teacher. He has four siblings. Brot attended local elementary schools and Aderet high school. As a teenager he was a youth counsellor for Bnei Akiva. After graduation, he joined the Hesder yeshiva of Yeshivat Har Etzion in Gush Etzion, founded by Rabbis Yehuda Amital and Aharon Lichtenstein. He served in the Israel Defense Forces as a reporter and broadcaster for Army Radio (Galei Zahal). Brot studied law, earning an LLB from Ono Academic College.

== Journalism and media career ==
Brot worked as a journalist for Army Radio and Yedioth Ahronoth, the largest circulation newspaper in Israel, covering the courts, military affairs, and the occupied West Bank. In 2005, he became the newspaper's parliamentary correspondent, reporting from the Knesset for ten years. While serving in this capacity, he exposed high-profile scandals and published investigative reports that led to the interrogation of a number of lawmakers and in some cases, to their resignation.

The strategy company he founded, BSI Public Affairs, provides services to international governments and non-governmental organizations. Together with his partners in Israel and the United States, Brot served as a strategic advisor to foreign governments and leaders.

In July 2016, Brot was hired by the U.S. Republican party to conduct an election campaign in Israel for U.S. President Donald Trump. U.S. Vice President Mike Pence called the event Brot organized in Jerusalem’s Old City, which was broadcast live to America, a “game-changer.” According to press reports, Brot ran a “disciplined and well-organized campaign targeting approximately 200,000 American citizens residing in Israel.”

== Political career ==
In December 2017, Israeli prime minister Benjamin Netanyahu asked Brot to serve as his senior advisor and director of communication. Brot is known as a supporter and close associate of Netanyahu. He turned down the offer, preferring to accept the Likud party invitation to become involved in local politics. In 2018, Brot ran for mayor of the coastal city of Bat Yam on the Likud ticket, defeating the incumbent mayor, Yossi Bachar, on the second round. Brot's vision for the city, described by Calcalist as one of Israel's largest, but also most crowded cities, is to step up development of employment hubs, commerce and hotels, while stemming the tide of residential housing construction.

In response to the 2020 COVID-19 pandemic, Brot proposed a series of measures to stop the spike in new infections, among them closing the local beaches between 10 a.m. and 5 p.m., closing synagogues, banning gatherings of more than ten people and closing schools from fifth grade and up. In an interview with Yedioth Ahronot correspondent Nahum Barnea, Brot described his city as a model in its response to the virus, taking preventive steps even before the government. In consequence, Bat Yam shifted from being defined as a “red” location, i.e., with a high incidence of infection to a “green” location, indicating that the spread of infection was under control.

== Awards and recognition ==
In 2008, Brot was listed by Forbes as one of the most influential Israelis under the age of 40.

== See also ==
- Local government in Israel
