= Al Gal =

Coordinates: 32.017246°N 34.73819°E

Al Gal is a beach area located on the west coast of Israel near the city of Bat Yam. It is an exposed beach break and reef break that has fairly consistent surf, specially during the months of summer when most of the surf comes in the form of wind waves.

Al Gal is regarded to be one of the best surf spots in the Middle East.
