= Bat Yam =

Coordinates: 32°01′N 34°45′E

Bat Yam בַּת יָם
- City
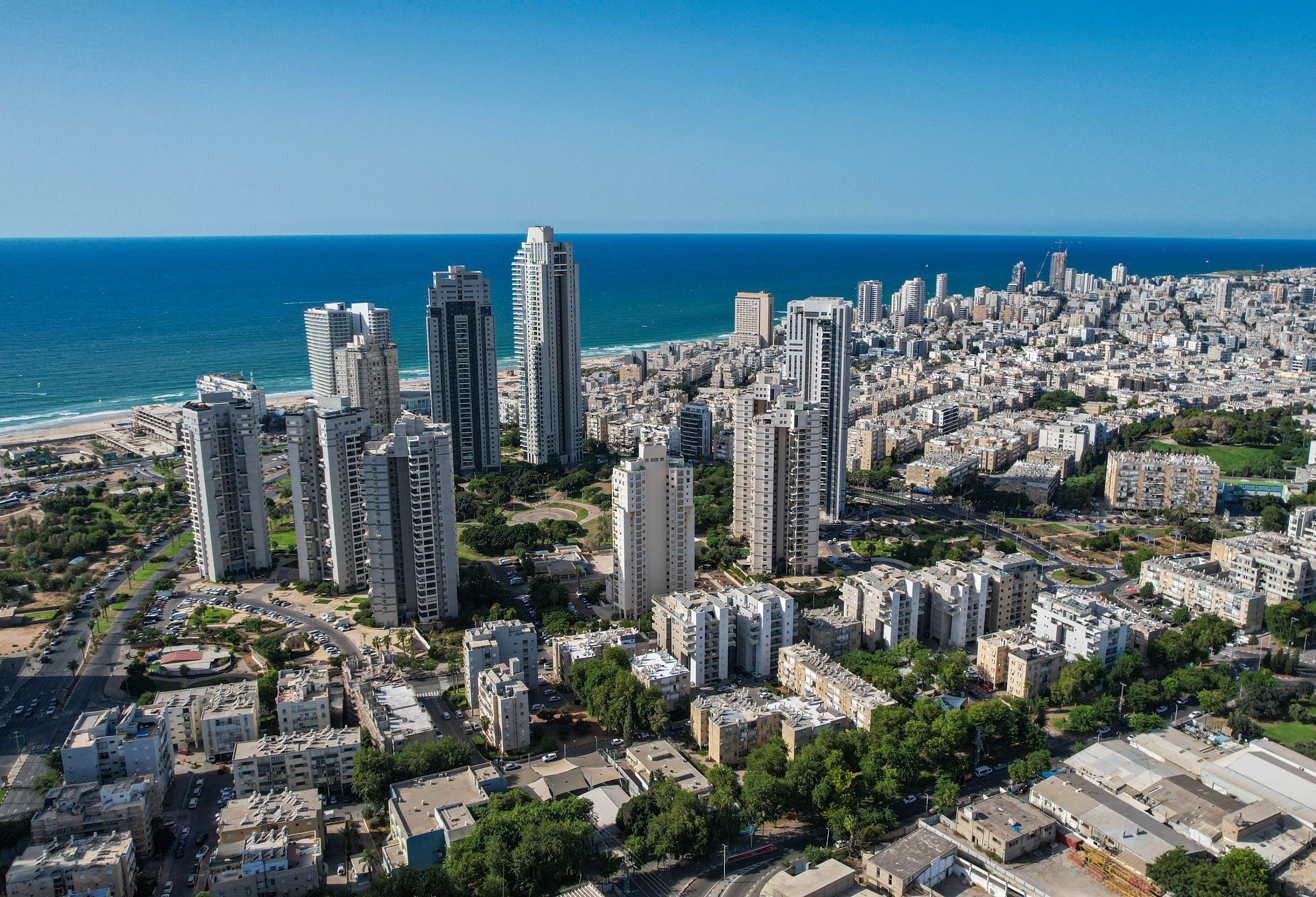
- View of Bat Yam

- Flag Coat of arms
- Interactive map of Bat Yam
- Location within Central Israel Location within Israel
- Country: Israel
- District: Tel Aviv
- Natural Region: Holon
- Founded: 1926

Government
  - Type: Mayor–council
  - Body: Municipality of Bat Yam
  - Mayor: Tzvika Brot (Likud)

Area
  - Total: 8,160 dunams (8.16 km^{2}; 3.15 sq mi)
- Elevation: 37 m (121 ft)

Population (2024)
  - Total: 129,494
  - Density: 15,900/km^{2} (41,100/sq mi)

Ethnicity
  - Jews and others: 99.1%
  - Arabs: 0.9%
- Time zone: UTC+2 (IST)
  - Summer (DST): UTC+3 (IDT)
- Name meaning: Daughter of the sea
- Website: bat-yam.muni.il

Bat Yam (Hebrew: בַּת יָם (audio)) is a city in the Tel Aviv District of Israel, on the Central Coastal Plain just south of Tel Aviv. It is part of the Gush Dan metropolitan area. In 2024, it had a population of 129,494.

== History ==
Historical population
Year	Pop.	±%
1948	2,300	—
1955	16,000	+595.7%
1961	31,700	+98.1%
1972	100,100	+215.8%
1983	128,700	+28.6%
1995	138,500	+7.6%
2008	130,300	−5.9%
2010	130,400	+0.1%
2011	128,200	−1.7%
2022	128,465	+0.2%
Source: CBS

=== British Mandate ===
Bat Yam, originally Beit VeGan ("House and Garden"), was founded in 1919 by the Beit VeGan homeowners association, affiliated with the Mizrachi movement. The association was formed to establish a religious garden suburb in Jaffa. By March 1920, it had 400 members. In 1921, 1,500 dunams (370 acres) of land were purchased, of which 1,400 were formally registered by 1923. In September 1924, an urban blueprint was approved by the association. In early 1926, the plots were divided up and a lottery was held to determine who would build first. By October 1926, roads and water supply were complete. Six families settled on the land in cabins. According to a 1927 report, ten houses were under construction. A synagogue was dedicated in October 1928. By then there were 13 families living in Bat Yam and a total of 20 houses.

In the wake of the 1929 Arab riots, the residents were evacuated by the British army and their homes turned into barracks. The soldiers left at the end of 1931. In 1932, the residents began to return and were joined by others. In November 1933, 85 families were living in the neighborhood. By early 1936, there were 300 homes and a population of 1400. Local industry began to develop, a movie theatre opened, and a hotel was established. The first school, named after Tachkemoni, was founded in 1936. The first headmaster was Haim Baruch Friedman.

In December 1936, Beit VeGan was declared a local council. It encompassed 3,500 dunams, 370 dunams of which were Arab-owned. In December 1937, the name was formally changed to Bat Yam (literally "daughter of the sea"). By 1945, 2,000 Jews were living in Bat Yam. In 1936–1939, the town was cut off from Tel Aviv because the road ran through Jaffa, leading to the construction of a new road via Holon. According to the Jewish National Fund, the population had risen to 4,000 by 1947.

Following the vote in favor of the United Nations Partition Plan for Palestine on November 29, 1947, and the fighting that accompanied the civil war in British Mandate, violent incidents, including sniping, were reported by the residents of Bat Yam.

=== State of Israel ===
After the independence of Israel in 1948, Bat Yam grew dramatically due to mass immigration. It gained city status in 1958.

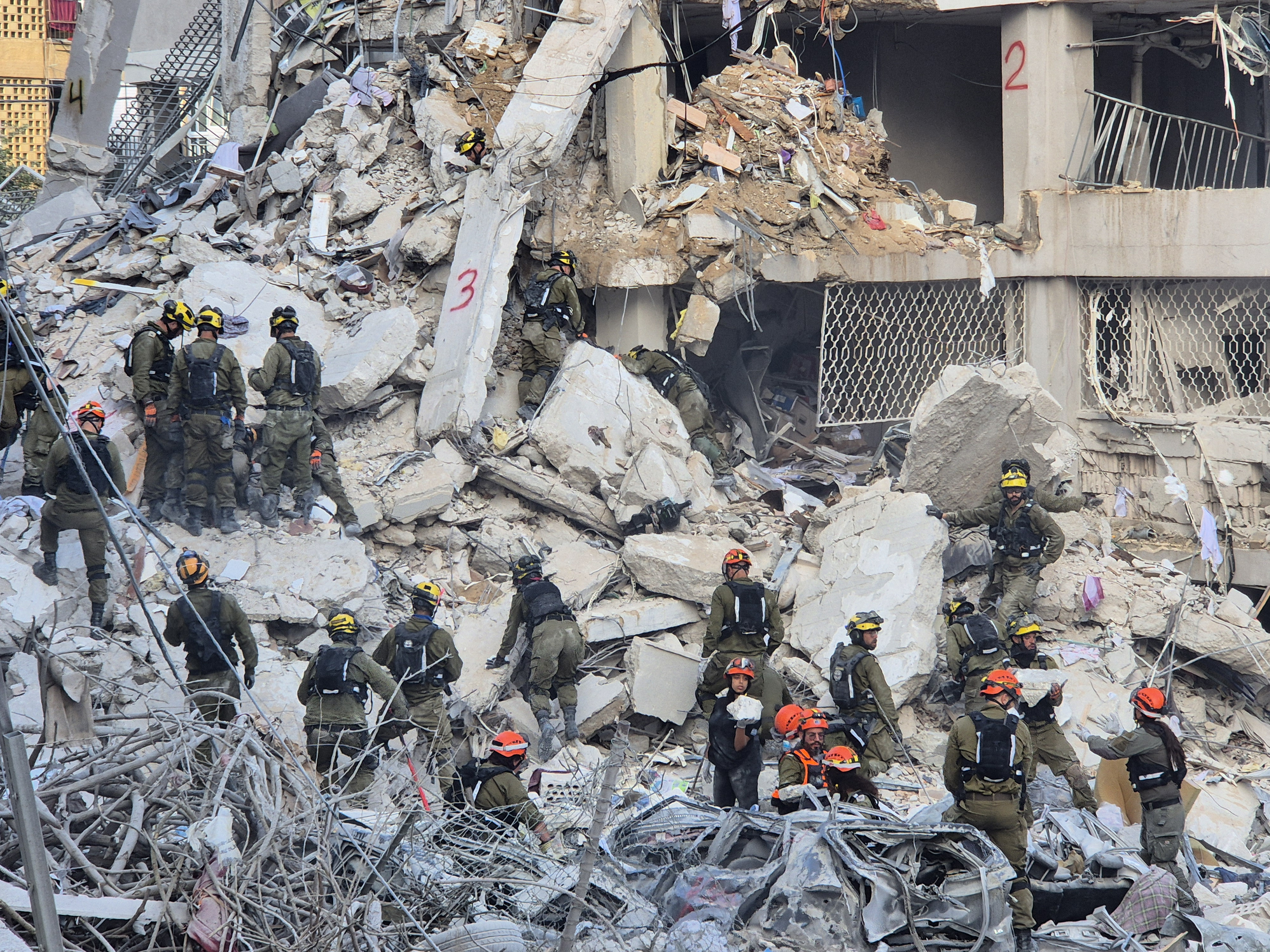
Aftermath of Iranian strikes during the Twelve-Day War

On June 15, 2025, an Iranian missile strike devastated a residential area in Bat Yam, killing at least nine people, including two children aged 8 and 10, injuring nearly 200, and leaving several still missing beneath the rubble. Bat Yam's mayor Tzvika Brot sued Iran for $70 million in damages caused to the city.

== Demographics ==
A small Hasidic enclave of Bobover Hasidim, known as Kiryat Bobov, was established in 1958.

The vast majority of Israelis of Vietnamese origin live in Bat Yam.

Since the wave of immigration of Jews from the former Soviet Union began in the 1970s, many Russian speakers settled in Bat Yam and continue to live there.

=== Health ===
The Yehuda Abarbanel Mental Health Center is a psychiatric hospital founded in 1944 by the British Mandate authorities. Since the establishment of the state, it had been administered by the Israeli Ministry of Health. The hospital, named for Judah Abravanel, a Portuguese rabbi, Jewish philosopher and physician in the Middle Ages, provides hospitalization and ambulatory services to residents of Tel Aviv, Jaffa, Holon and Bat Yam coping with mental illness.

=== Education ===
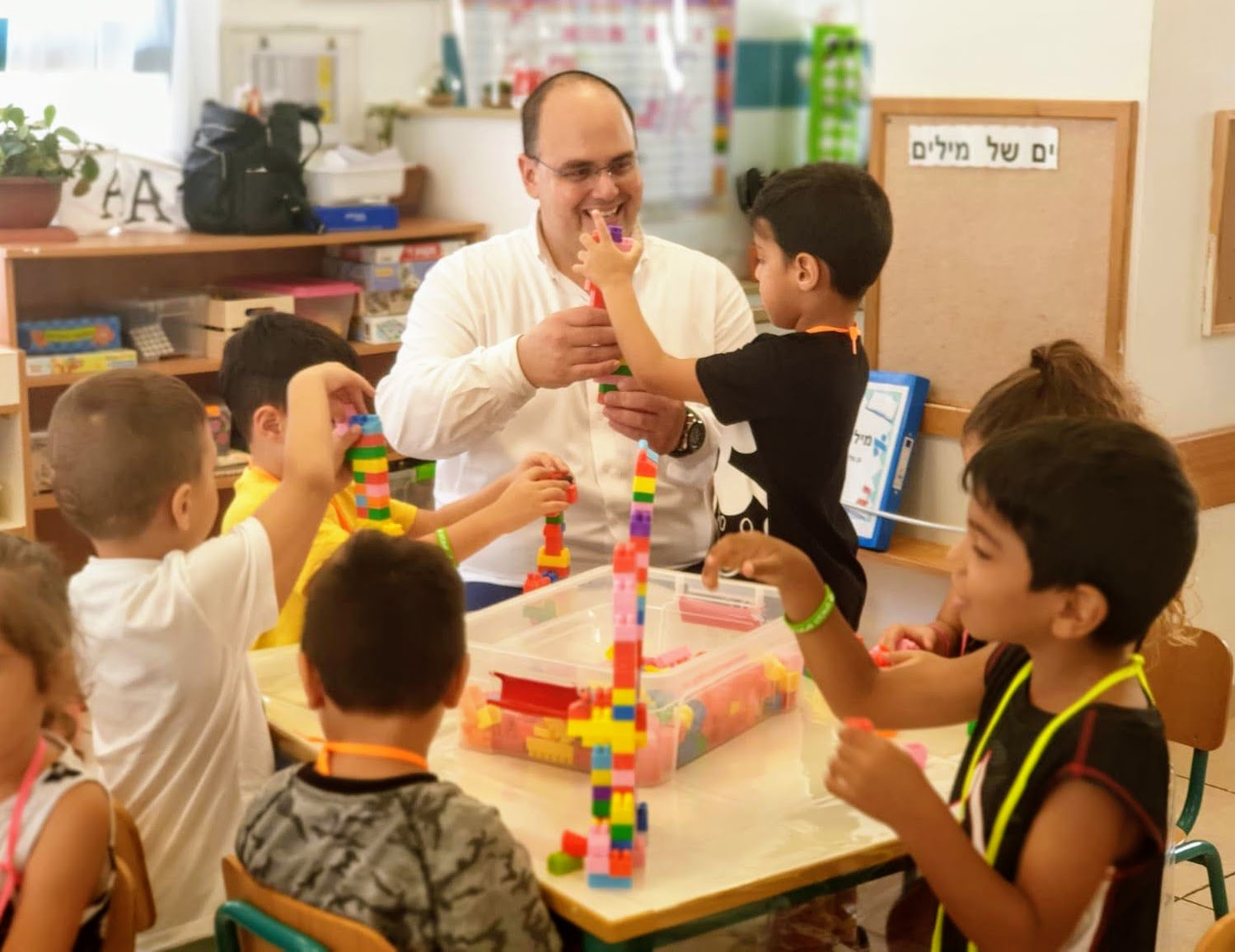
Bat Yam mayor Tzvika Brot at a local kindergarten

In 2008, the Weitzman-Albert Education Initiative headed by Jane Gershon, wife of fashion shoe designer Stuart Weitzman invested over $2 million in Bat Yam's Harel Elementary School, which received a top Education Ministry award for academic achievement and immigrant integration.

In 2017, the percentage of high school students eligible for a bagrut matriculation certificate reached 86.3%, compared to the 68.2% national average. The number of high school students doing a five-point exam in mathematics is also on the rise thanks to a program inaugurated in 2015 in cooperation with the Donald J. Trump Foundation and Alliance Israélite Universelle to encourage excellence in math.

=== Main neighborhoods ===
==== Ramat Yosef ====
Named after Yosef Sprinzak, and one of the oldest in Bat Yam, with most of its houses built in the fifties and sixties.

==== Shikun Amidar ====
A religious-traditional neighborhood. The Defenders' Square, the main commercial center of the neighborhood and the city, is in its northwest.

==== Kiryat Bobov ====
An ultra-orthodox-Chassidic neighborhood of the Bobover Hasidism, led by Rabbi Meizlish, brother-in-law of the Rebbe of Bobov. In the neighborhood there is a synagogue, a Talmud Torah, a small yeshiva, and a large yeshiva all in one building as well as Bat Yam's largest mikveh.

==== Orot HaTorah ====
Mainly home to Orot HaTorah Congregation, a religious Zionist community led by Rabbi David Chai HaCohen, among the neighborhood's institutions of the Orot HaTorah Congregation: the synagogue, the high yeshiva "Yishiva Nativot Yisrael", and Talmud Torah Orot HaTorah.

==== Chabad ====
Home to the Chabad community, which has five synagogues, a central Chabad house, a boys' kindergarten, a girls' kindergarten, Talmud Torah, a seminary for women and girls, and a Mikveh.

=== Main sites ===
==== HaMeginim (the Defenders') Square ====
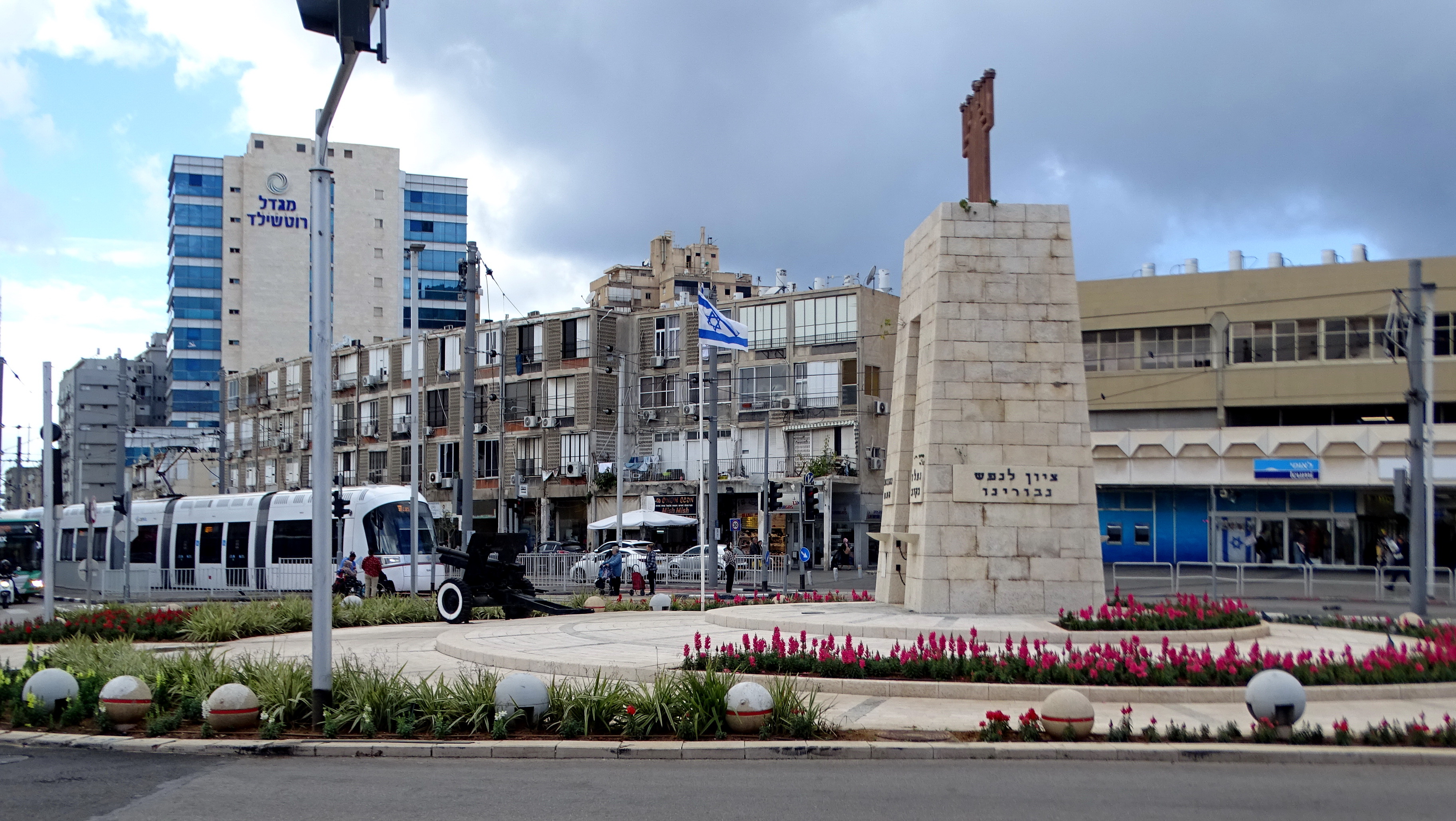
HaMeginim Square

A monument in the memory of the defenders of the city who fell in battle. Located at the entrance to Bat Yam from Tel Aviv. In the War of Independence, there was a defense post in this place called "Hashdera" or "King George's Position" (the previous name of the Independence Boulevard).

==== Bat Yam Heritage Museum ====
The museum is located in the municipal library building. The museum has photographs, documents and various exhibits on the history of Bat Yam in the years 1926–1948, including a detailed description of the city's standing in the War of Independence.

==== HaSela (the Rock) Beach ====
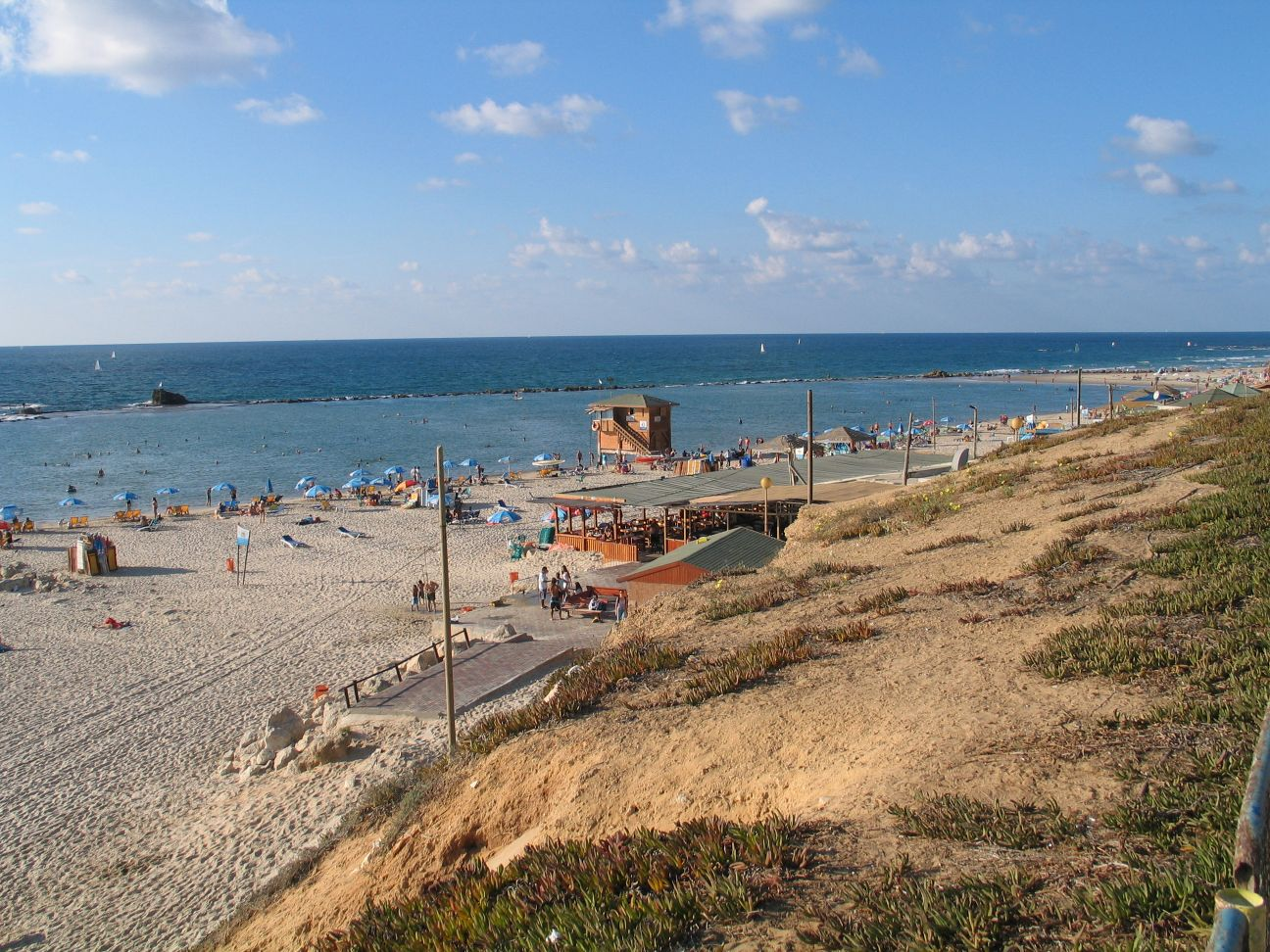
HaSela Beach

A popular beach, surrounded by a breakwater, suitable for all ages. The beach is very active and sports activities are held there in the early morning hours. In the summer season there are summer events such as street stalls, clowns and shows. The tiny island of Adam's Rock is located here.

==== Bat Yam City Hall ====
The Bat Yam City Hall was designed by the architects Zvi Hecker, Eldar Sharon and Alfred Neumann. When it was built between 1960 and 1963, the building stood alone in the heart of the dunes and was exposed to the coastline of Bat Yam. The building of reinforced concrete was designed in the form of an inverted ziggurat, in Brutalist architecture style. The design was chosen in a competition in 1959 which drew entries from the leading architectural firms in Israel.

== Government ==
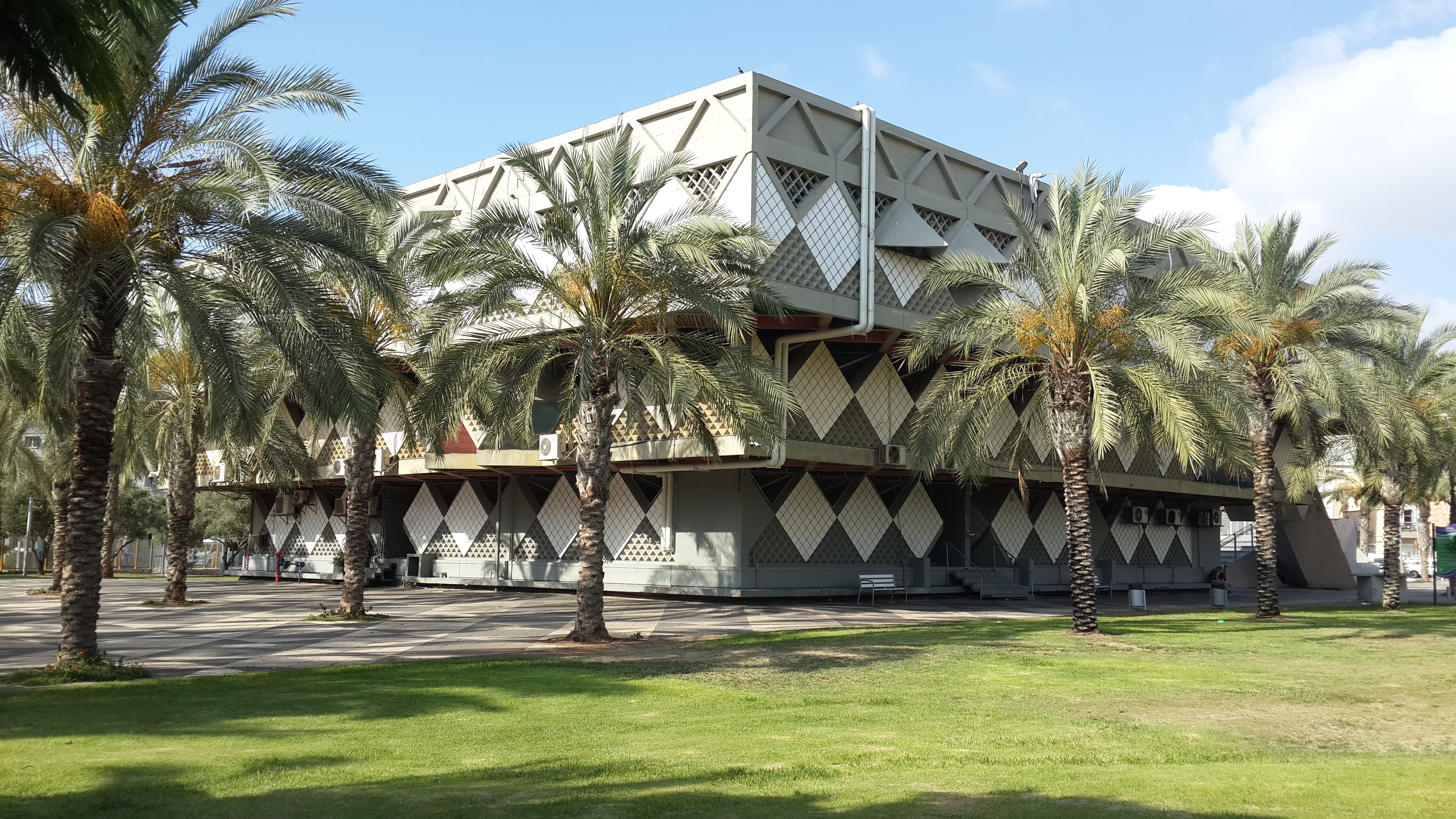
Bat Yam City Hall

In the early 2000s, after financial scandals under the leadership of Yehoshua Sagi, the city was on the brink of bankruptcy. In 2003, he was replaced by Shlomo Lahiani, founder of the Bat Yam Berosh Muram (Bat Yam Heads-Up) party. In 2008, he was re-elected with 86% of the vote. In 2014, Lahiani pleaded guilty to three counts of breach of public trust after being charged with bribery and income tax fraud. He was replaced by Yossi Bachar.

In 2014, after the Bat Yam municipality petitioned the Israeli Supreme Court, Interior Minister Gideon Saar appointed a steering committee to explore the possibility of incorporating the city as part of Tel Aviv-Yafo as a way of reviving its stagnant economy. Later that year, when Gideon Sa’ar was replaced by Gilad Erdan, a decision was reached to transfer funding to Bat Yam directly from the state budget. The plan for unification was postponed until the next municipal elections in 2023. In 2019, Bat Yam's current mayor, Tzvika Brot, said he opposed the union with Tel Aviv.

=== Council heads and mayors ===
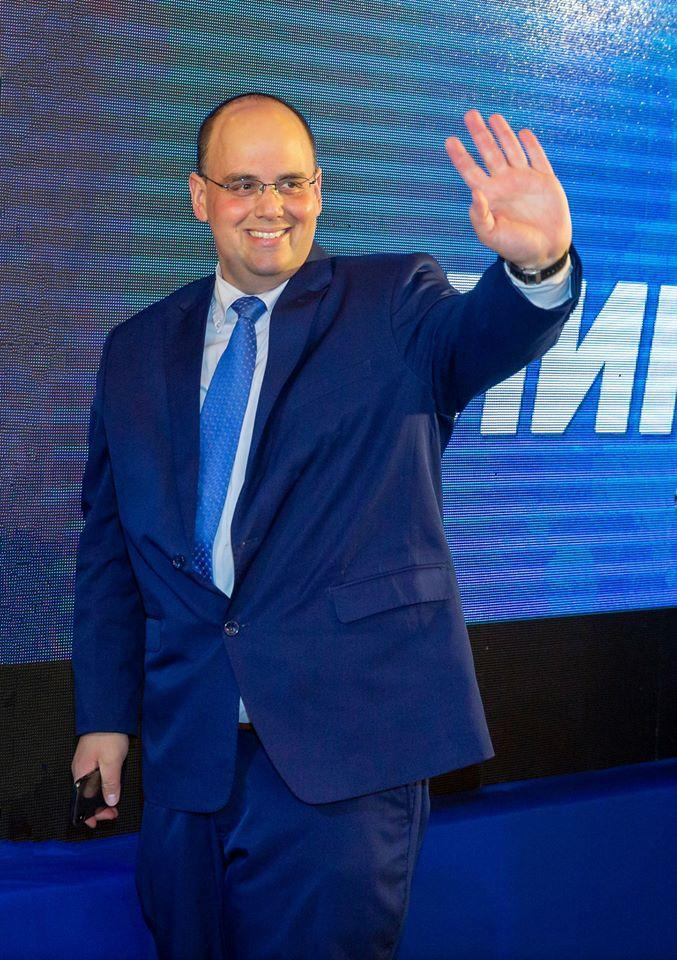
Tzvika Brot

Type	Name	Years
Head of council	Ben-Zion Mintz	1936–37
Head of council	Ben Zion Yisrael	1937–39
Head of council	Yisrael Rabinovich-Teomim	1939–43
Head of council	Eliav Levai	1943–50
Head of council	David Ben Ari	1950–58
Mayor	David Ben Ari	1958–63
Mayor	Menachem Rothschild	1963–73
Mayor	Yitzhak Walker	1973–77
Mayor	David Mesika	1977–78
Mayor	Menachem Rothschild	1978–83
Mayor	Ehud Kinamon	1983–93
Mayor	Yehoshua Sagi	1993–2003
Mayor	Shlomo Lahiani	2003–14
Mayor	Yossi Bachar	2014–18
Mayor	Tzvika Brot	2018–date

== Urban development ==
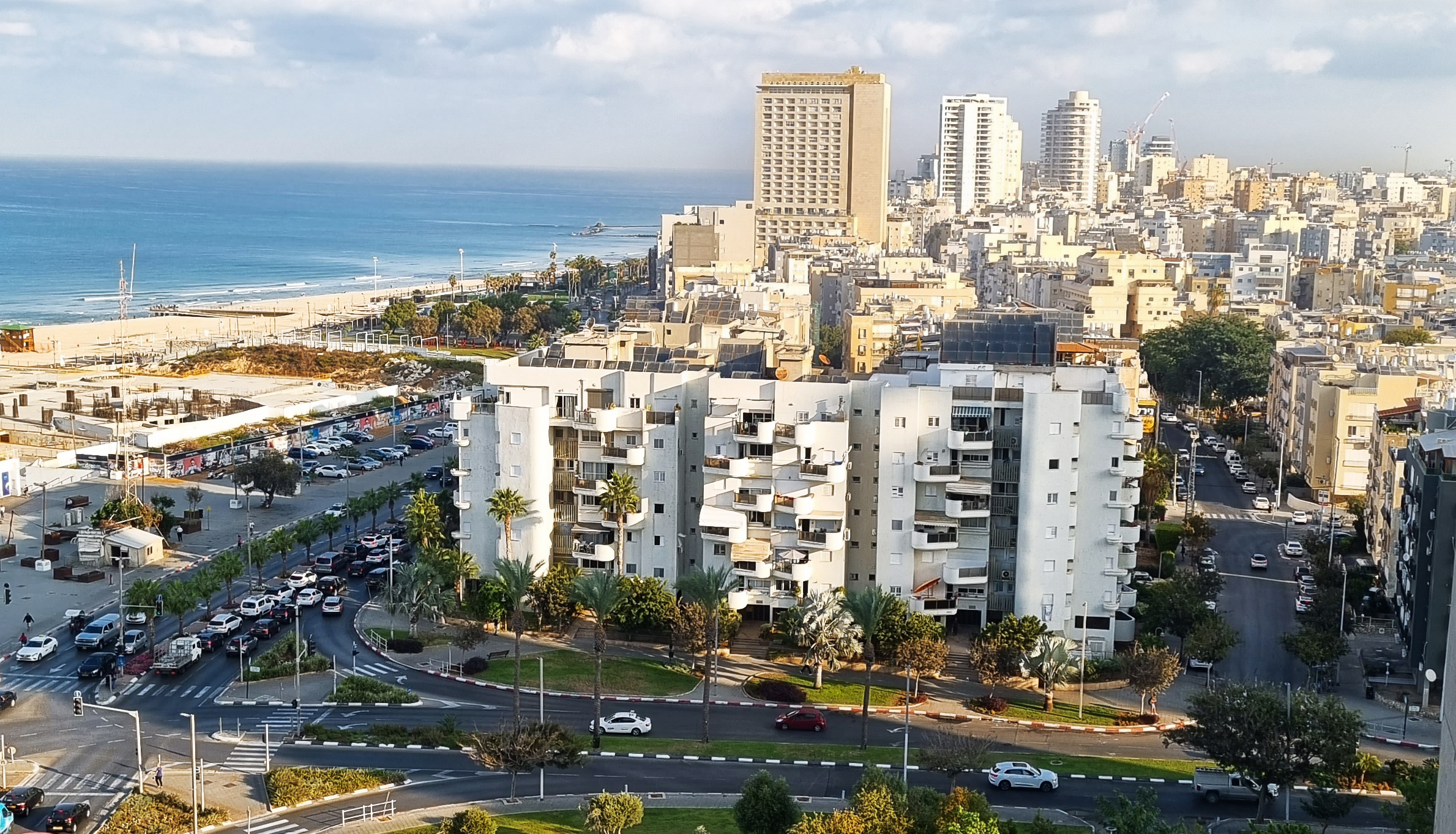
A street in Bat Yam

In 2016, the municipality approved an urban renewal plan in the Ramat HaNasi neighborhood, adding 950 high-end apartments. According to Israel Central Bureau of Statistics (CBS), residents of Bat Yam have the lowest income among the largest cities in Israel.

According to Bat Yam mayor Tzvika Brot, the city is looking for creative solutions to rebuild the city and preserve its economic independence. The city has six beaches and a 3.2 kilometer (2 mile) long promenade along the Mediterranean coast that connects to the Tel Aviv boardwalk.

According to a report in Ynet, Bat Yam has become a countrywide leader in urban renewal. Many of the city's older buildings are undergoing construction to strengthen their foundations, add floors and improve their appearance, and dozens of parks are being beautified and made accessible to visitors with disabilities.

== Culture ==
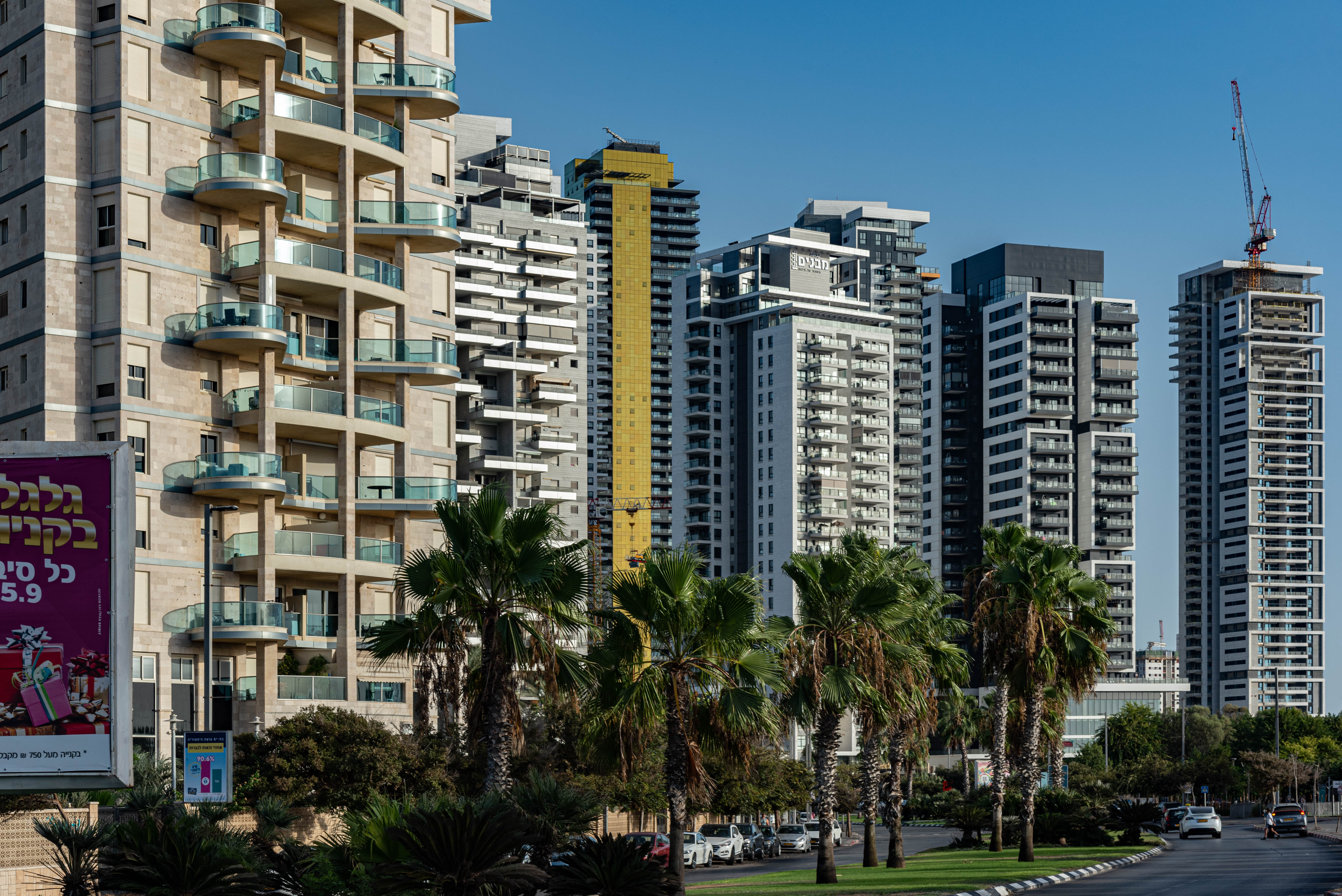
A neighborhood in Bat Yam

In the heart of Bat Yam is a three-museum complex known as MoBY. The main building, David Ben-Ari Museum for Contemporary art was established in 1961. The Rybak House and the Sholem Asch Museum house MoBY's permanent collections and offer educational programs. The Bat Yam Heritage Museum is adjacent to the municipal library. The city has two shopping malls, Bat Yam Mall, which opened in 1993, and Bat Yamon Mall.

The Bat Yam amphitheatre, also built in the 1960s near the beach, is a venue for concerts and public events. The International Street Theater Festival, the largest open-space performance art celebration in Israel, is an annual summer event in Bat Yam.

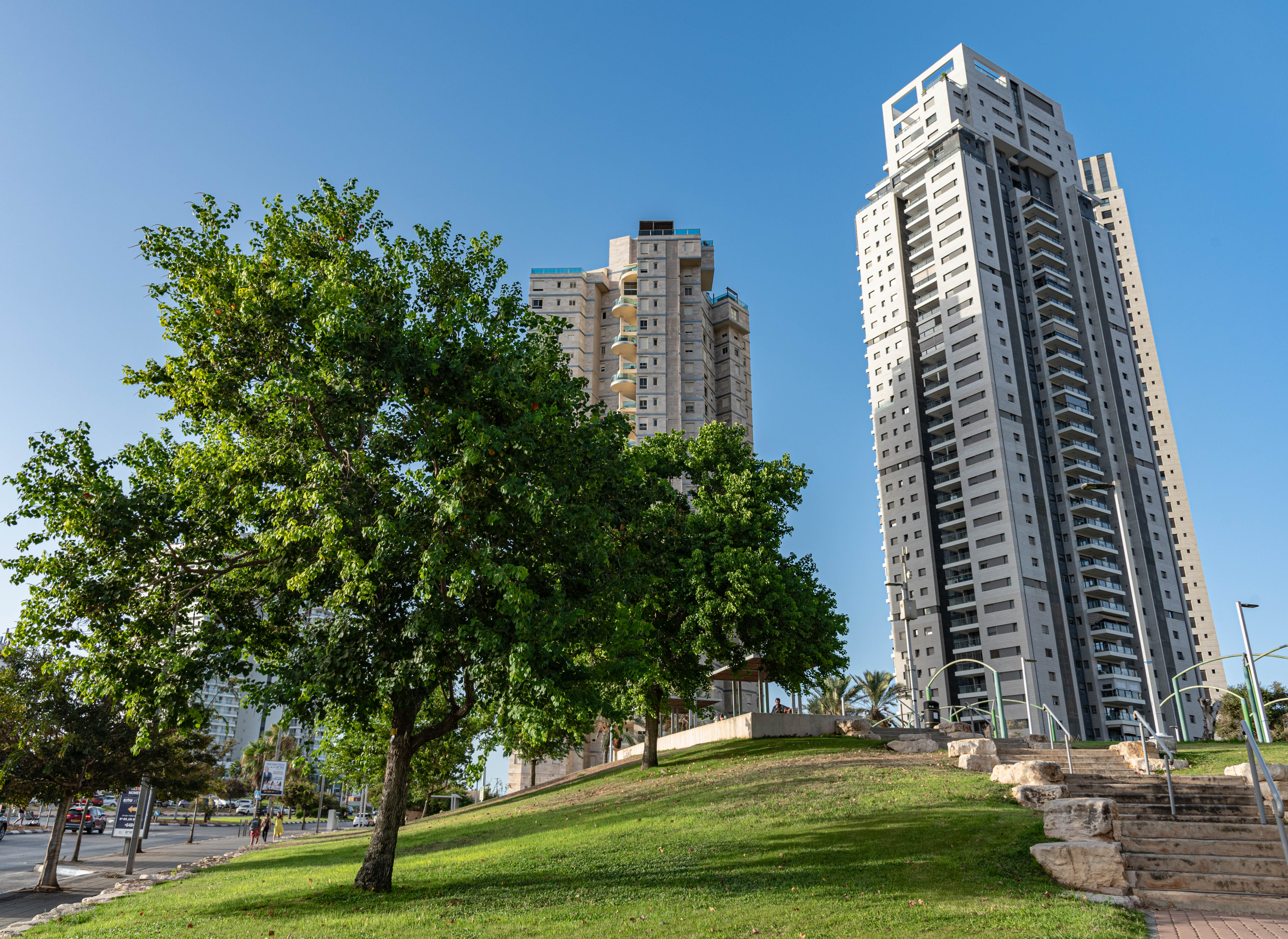
A park in Bat Yam

The Ryback House showcases the work of Issachar Ber Ryback. The Yiddish writer Sholom Asch, who lived in Bat Yam in his later years, willed his home to the Bat Yam municipality, which turned it into museum.

In 2008 the Bat-Yam International Biennale of Landscape Urbanism, which is devoted to re-examining urban spaces through art and architecture, was held in Bat Yam. In 2010, the second Biennale, "Timing" took place, which featured site-specific installations from designers and architects from around the world.

The Center for Urbanism and Mediterranean Culture is a research institute devoted to the creation of a new discourse in Israeli urban space. The head of the center is veteran Haaretz correspondent Avirama Golan.

=== Beaches ===
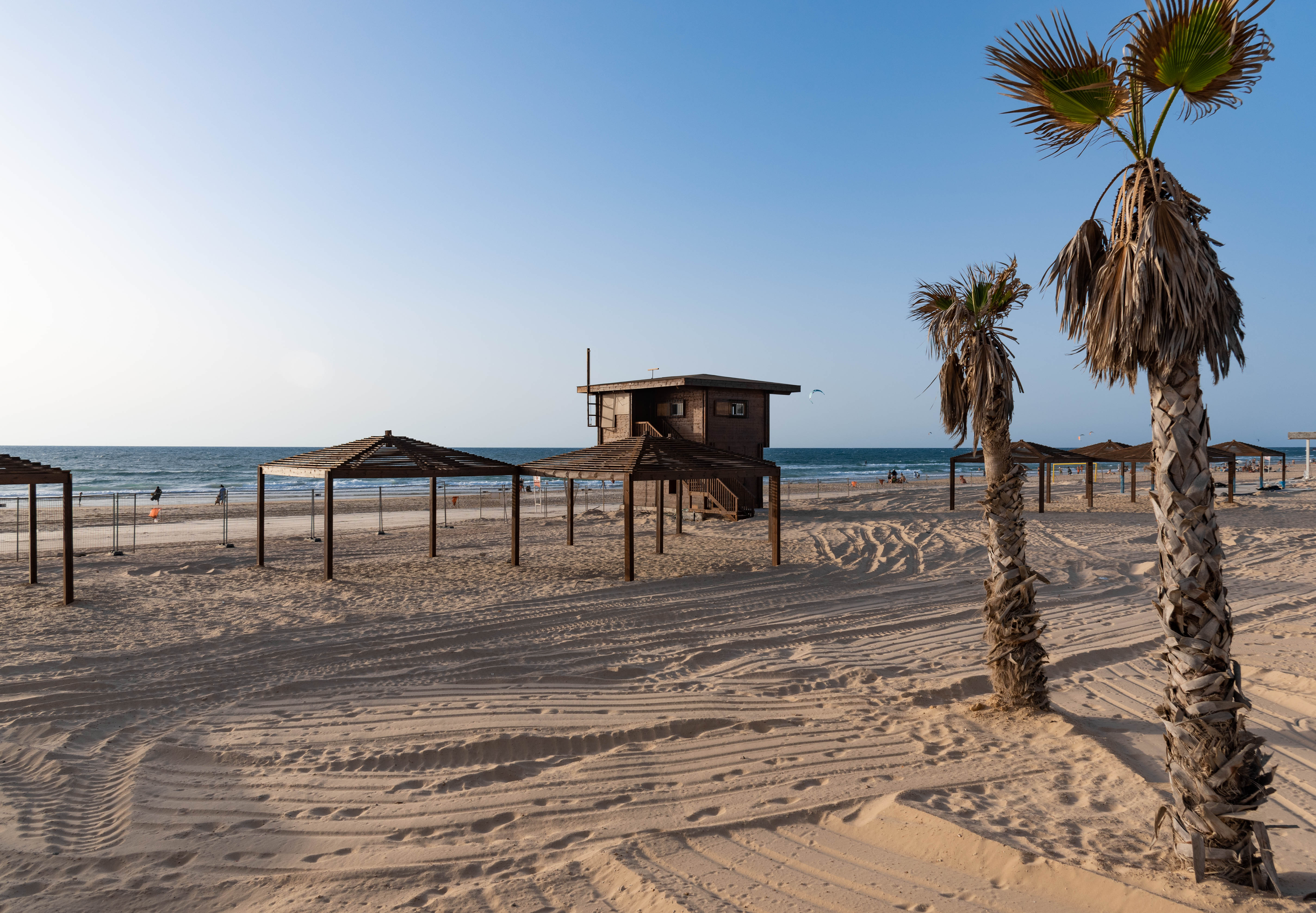
Marina Beach

The location of Bat Yam on the Mediterranean makes it popular with beach-goers. Bat Yam has a 3.2 km (2 mi) long promenade along the ocean lined with pubs and restaurants. The city has six beaches, one of which is protected by a breakwater.

Bat Yam's Al Gal beach is a popular surfing spot with fairly consistent surf conditions, especially during the summer months. Both Al Gal and Hagolshim are straight, exposed dune-backed beaches.

=== Sports ===
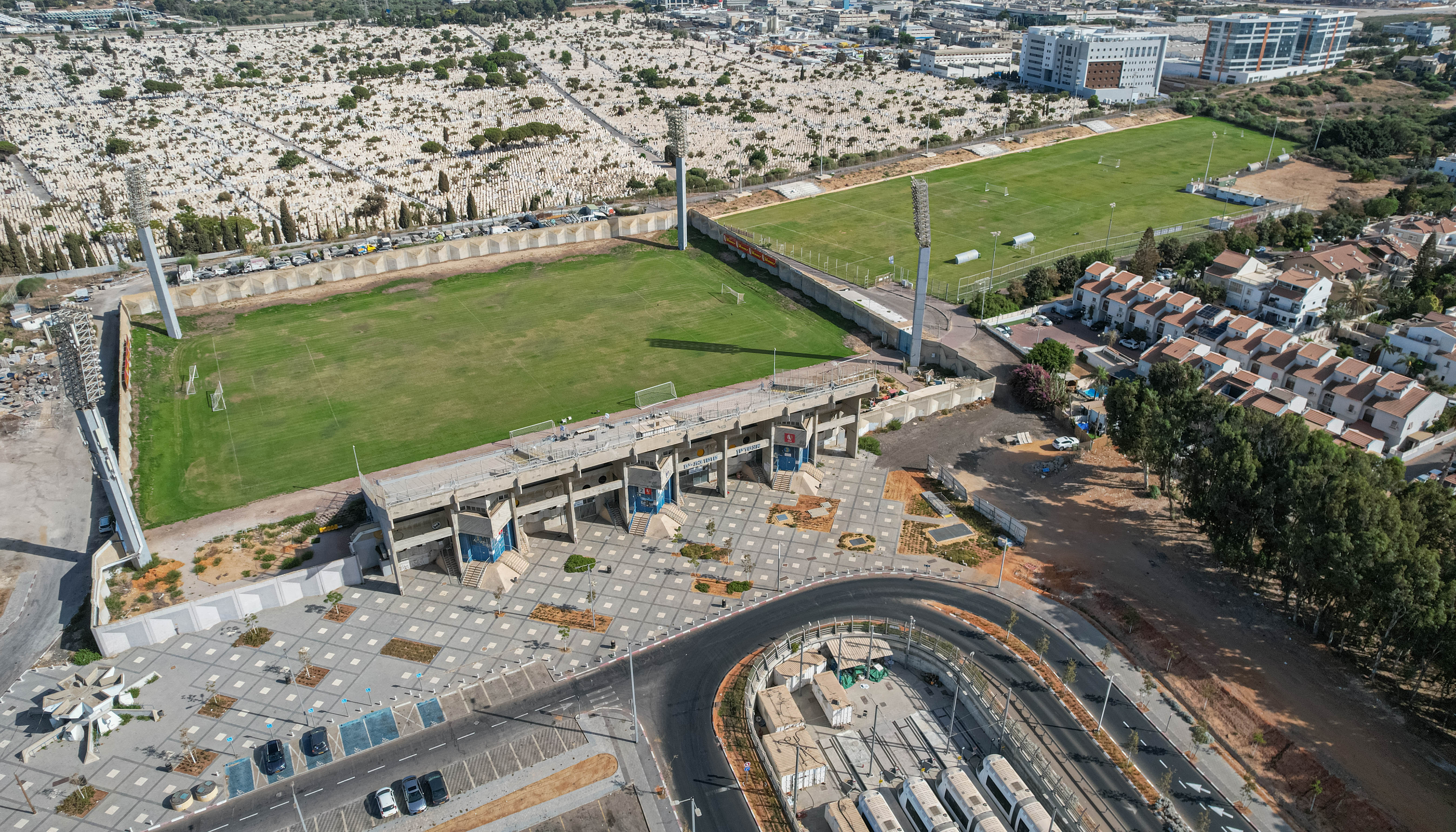
Bat Yam Municipal Stadium

The city's major football (soccer) club, Beitar Tel Aviv Bat Yam, currently plays in Liga Leumit, the second level of Israeli football.

=== Archaeology ===
In September 2011, an iron anchor dating to the Byzantine period was discovered off the coast of Bat Yam. According to the Israel Antiquities Authority, it was likely that of a boat that sank in a storm about 1,700 years ago and may be proof of an unknown ancient harbor on the coast.

== Transportation ==
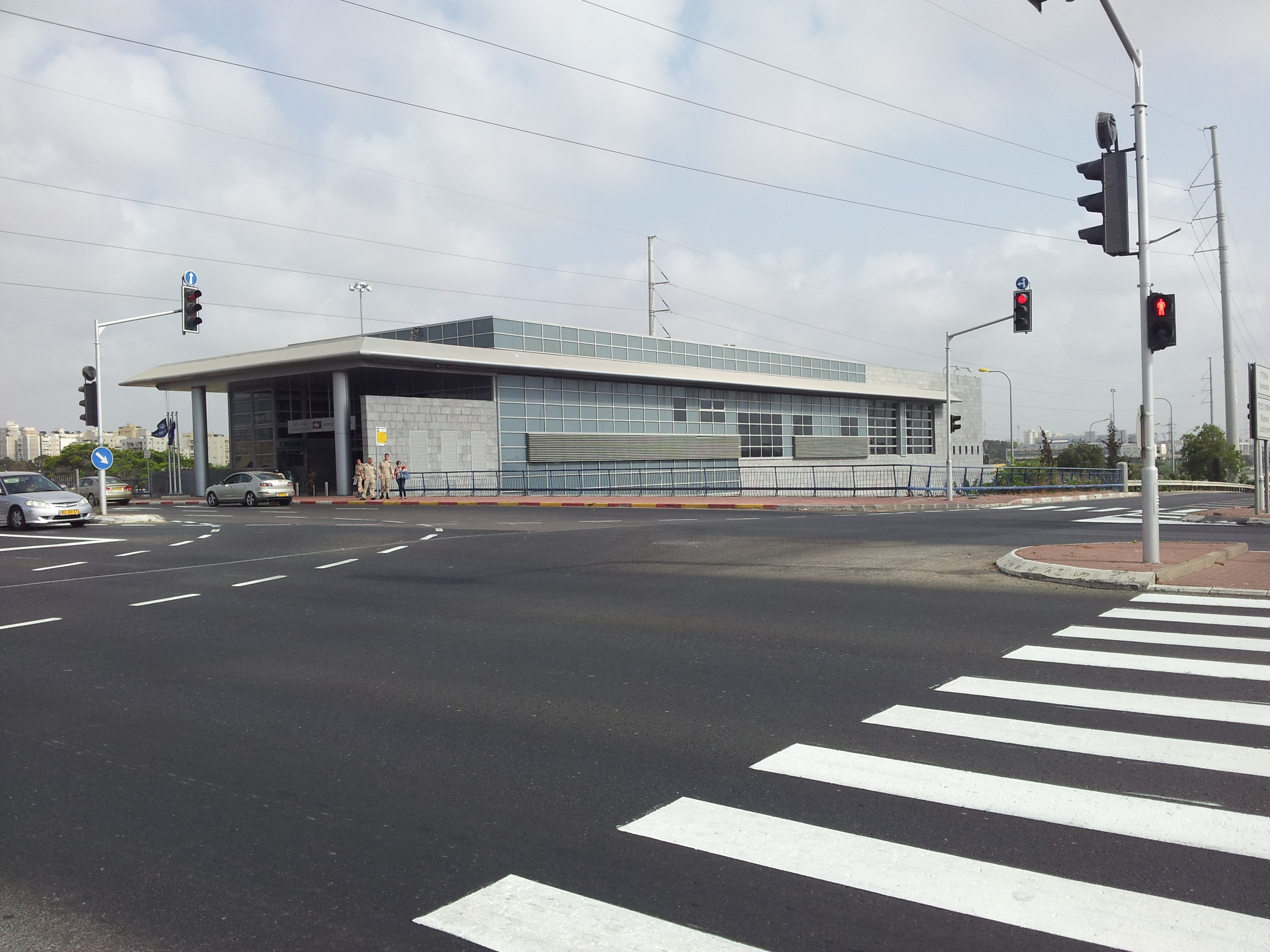
Komemiyut railway station

Two railway stations opened in the city in 2011 as part of the new Tel Aviv–Rishon LeZion West line: Bat Yam–Yoseftal railway station and Bat Yam–Komemiyut railway station. Bat Yam is served by the Red Line of the Tel Aviv Light Rail since August 18, 2023, and is planned to be served by the Metro line M3. The city will be the terminus for both lines and the lines will meet at the new Yoseftal Station.

The city will be served by the Ayalon Route of the Ofnidan bike path network.

== Voting Patterns ==
In the 2022 election, 57 percent of voters in Bat Yam voted for the parties of the right-wing coalition led by Benjamin Netanyahu, while 40 percent voted for the parties of the center-left coalition led by Yair Lapid and 0.4 percent voted for the Arab parties.

In the 2026 election, 50 percent of voters in Bat Yam voted for the parties of the right-wing coalition led by Benjamin Netanyahu, while 44 percent voted for the parties of the center-left coalition led by Gadi Eisenkot and 0.6 percent voted for the Arab parties. An additional 3.6 percent voted for the Reservists, and 1.3 percent voted for Amcha Yisrael. Voter turnout increased 13 percent from the 2022 election.

== Twin towns – sister cities ==
Bat Yam is twinned with:

- Edirne, Turkey
- Aurich, Germany
- Kostroma, Russia
- Kragujevac, Serbia
- Kutno, Poland
- Livorno, Italy
- Neukölln, Germany
- Valparaíso, Chile
- Villeurbanne, France
- Vinnytsia, Ukraine
- Manhattan, United States

== Notable people ==
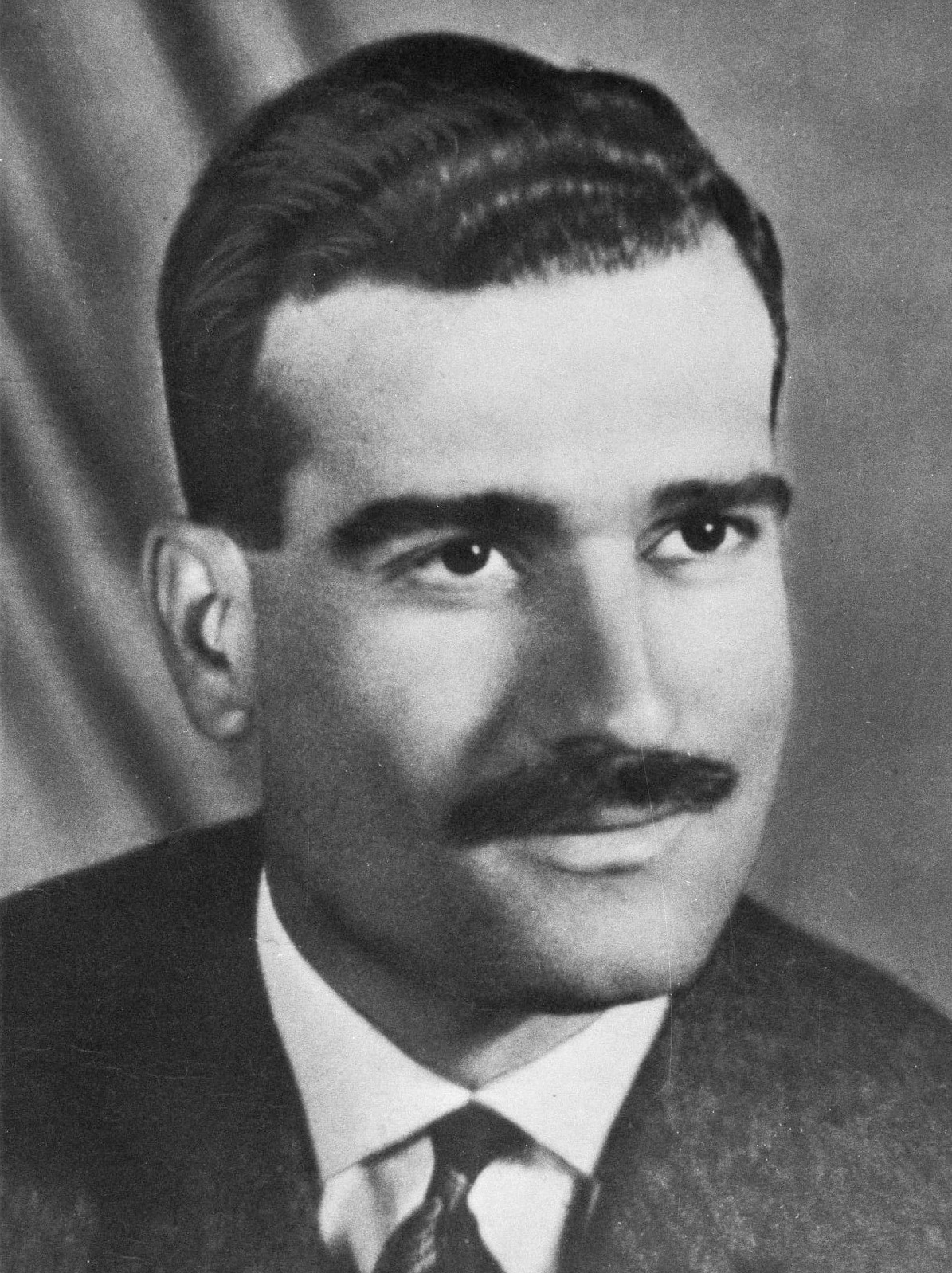
Eli Cohen

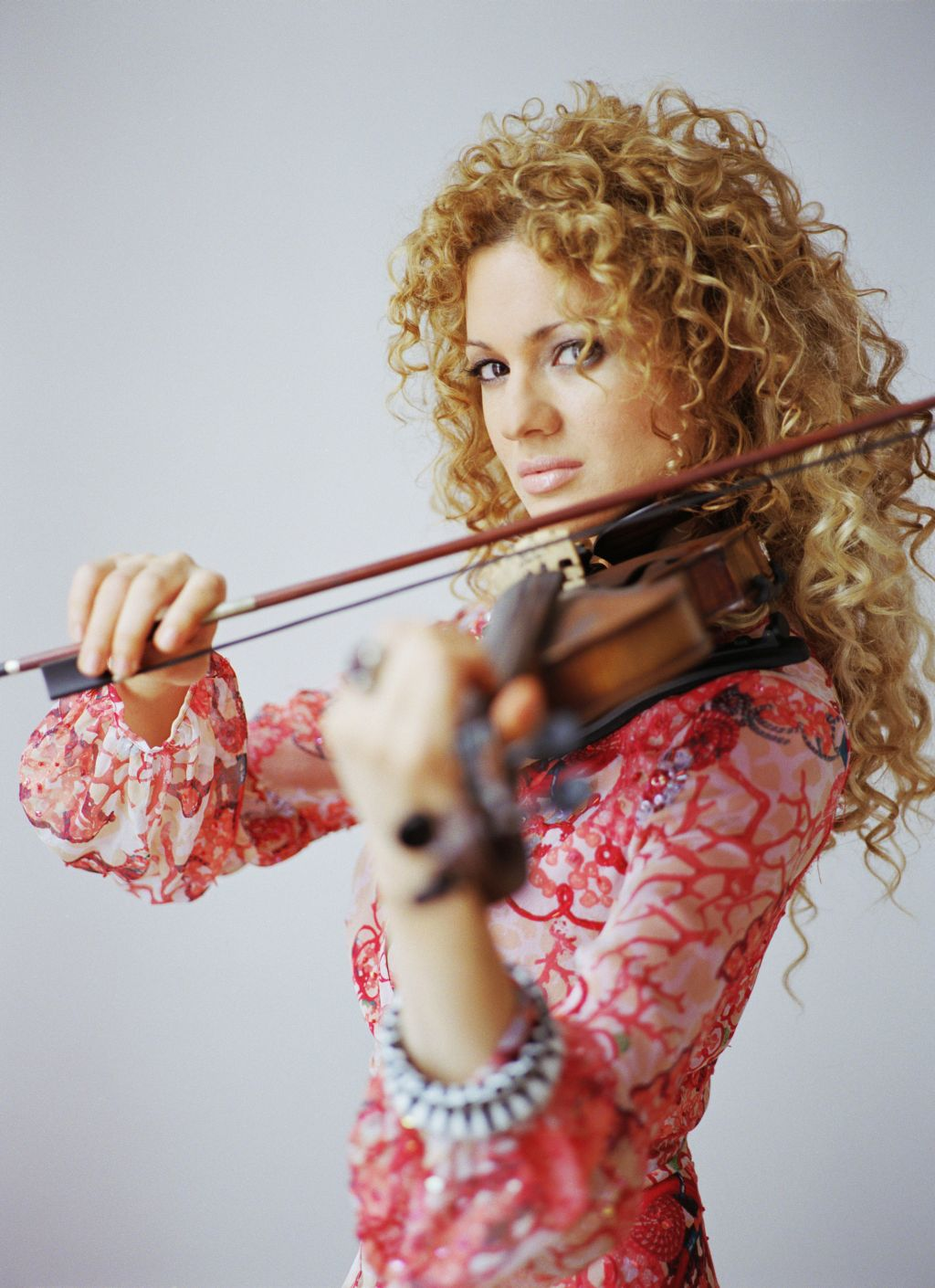
Miri Ben-Ari

- Shay Abutbul (born 1983), soccer player
- Michael Barkai (1935–1999), Commander of the Israeli Navy
- Miri Ben-Ari (born 1978), hip hop violinist
- Noa (born 1969), singer, songwriter and Israeli Eurovision Song Contest 2009 entrant
- Moshe Biton (born 1982), soccer player
- Vered Buskila (born 1983), Olympic sailor
- Tomer Chencinski (born 1984), Israeli–Canadian soccer player
- Eli Cohen (1924–1965), Israeli spy
- Meir Dagan (1945–2016), Director of the Mossad
- David D'Or (born 1965), singer, songwriter and Israeli Eurovision Song Contest 2004 entrant.
- Elana Eden (born 1940), actress
- Sharon Farber (born 1965), composer
- Haim Gozali (born 1973), mixed martial arts fighter
- Matt Haimovitz (born 1970), cellist
- Henryk Hechtkopf (1910–2004), illustrator
- Rita Katz (born 1963), terrorism analyst and co-founder of the SITE Intelligence Group
- Gili Landau (born 1958), footballer and manager
- Sergey Richter (born 1989), Olympic sport shooter
- Peter Roth (born 1974), singer, songwriter, guitarist and member of Monica Sex
- Gal Shish (born 1989), soccer player
- Itzik Zohar (born 1970), soccer player
