= Bat Yam–Yoseftal railway station =

Railway station in Israel

Bat Yam–Yoseftal בת ים – יוספטל
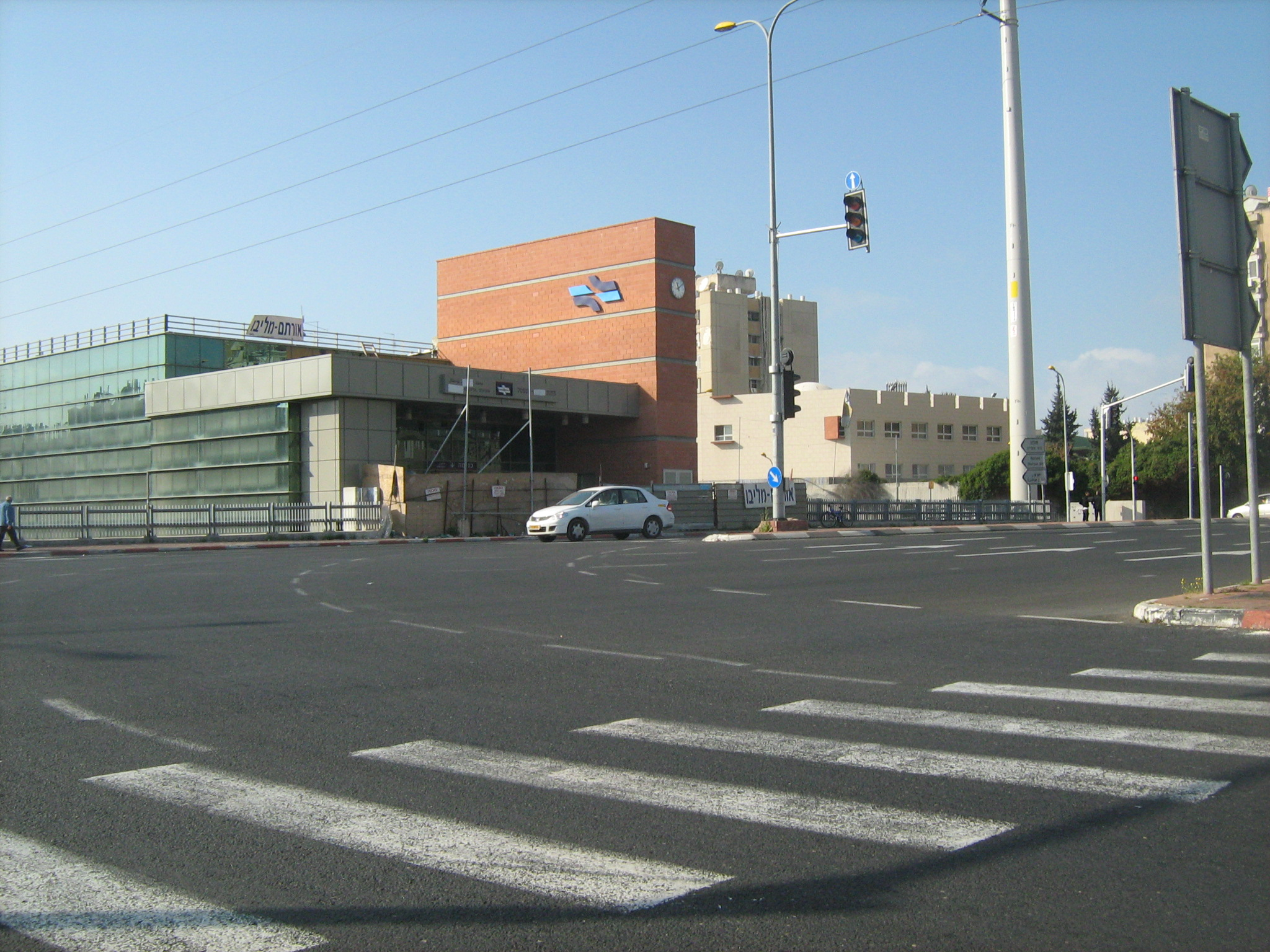
- The station as seen shortly before its opening in 2011.

General information
- Location: Yoseftal Street/Ayalon Highway; Bat Yam/Holon; Israel
- Coordinates: 32°00′54″N 34°45′43″E

Construction
- Accessible: yes

History
- Opened: 25 September 2011; 14 years ago
- Electrified: 25 December 2021; 4 years ago

Passengers
- 2019: 1,810,003
- Rank: 28 out of 68
Location

Bat Yam–Yoseftal railway station is a railway station on the Rosh HaAyin–Beersheba line. It is located at the Yoseftal interchange on the Ayalon Highway, on the border between Bat Yam and Holon, just south of Tel Aviv, Israel.

== Train service ==
All trains serving the Rosh HaAyin–Beersheba line stop at this station, as well as at all stations of the line.

On most weekday hours there is a train every 30 minutes each direction. On rush hours there is a train every 15 minutes each direction. Some of the southbound trains terminate at Rishon LeZion Moshe Dayan or Ashkelon and do not continue to Be'er Sheva.

== Public transport connections ==
Public transportation is required to access the station as there is no parking nearby the station.

The station is served by bus routes 2A, 6, 43, 87 and 99.

| Preceding station | Israel Railways | Following station |
|---|---|---|
| Holon–Wolfson towards Herzliya | Herzliya–Ashkelon | Bat Yam–Komemiyut towards Ashkelon |
