= Park HaHorshot =

Public park in Tel Aviv, Israel

- Interactive map of Park HaHorshot
- Type: Urban park
- Location: Tel Aviv, Israel
- Coordinates: 32°02′45″N 34°46′13″E
- Operator: Municipality of Tel Aviv
- Status: Open

Park HaHorshot (Hebrew: פארק החורשות, lit. 'Park of Groves'), or Park of the Groves, is a park in the Israeli city of Tel Aviv.

== History ==
Following the destruction of Abu Kabir in the 1948 Palestine war, the area of the former village became abandoned.

In 2013, restoration work began for clean up and redesign as an urban park while preserving the natural surroundings. The park has a playground for children and bike paths in addition to orchards and a botanical garden. The park also has a Russian Orthodox church named St. Peter.

During the construction of the Tel Aviv Light Rail, the park was temporarily closed to accommodate for the construction site.

== See also ==
- Biodiversity in Israel
- List of national parks and nature reserves of Israel
- Tourism in Israel
- Railway Park
- National Sport Center Tel Aviv
