= Bat Yam–Komemiyut railway station =

Railway station in Israel

Bat Yam–Komemiyut בת ים – קוממיות
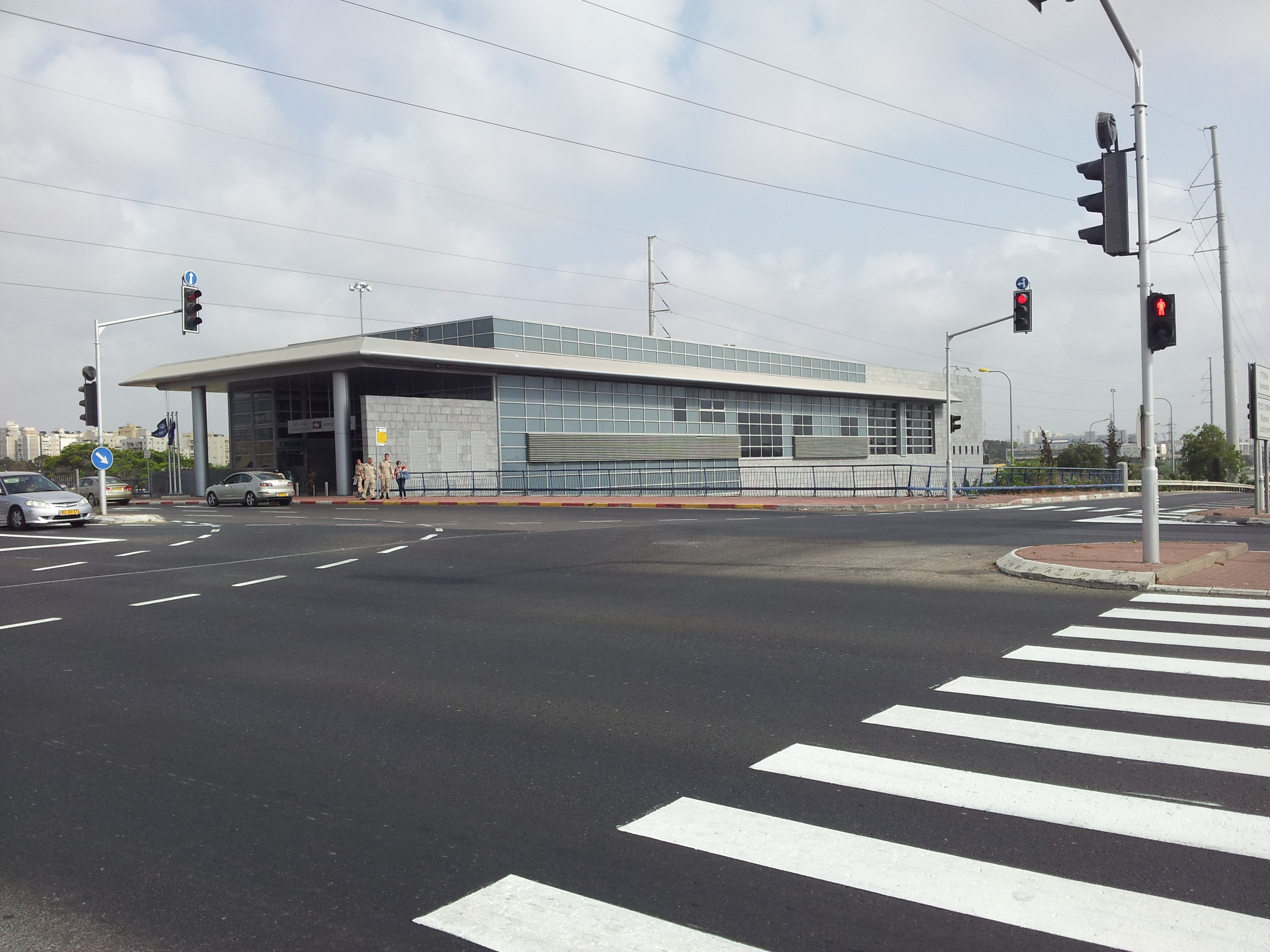

General information
- Location: Komemiyut interchange, on the border between Bat Yam and Holon
- Coordinates: 32°00′03″N 34°45′34″E

History
- Opened: 25 September 2011; 14 years ago
- Electrified: 25 December 2021; 4 years ago

Passengers
- 2019: 934,648
- Rank: 39 out of 68
Location

Bat Yam–Komemiyut railway station is a railway station on the Rosh HaAyin–Beersheba line in Israel. It is located at the Komemiyut interchange of the Ayalon Highway, on the border between Bat Yam and Holon.

== Train service ==
All trains serving the Rosh HaAyin–Beersheba line stop at this station, as well as at all stations of the line.

On most weekday hours there is a train every 30 minutes each direction. On rush hours there is a train every 15 minutes each direction. Some of the southbound trains terminate at Rishon LeZion Moshe Dayan or Ashkelon and do not continue to Beersheba.

== Public transport connections ==
The station is served by bus routes 2A, 6, 11, 14, 19, 26, 40, 85, 87, 99, 143, 240 and 425.

Preceding station	Israel Railways	Following station
Bat Yam–Yoseftal towards Herzliya	Herzliya–Ashkelon	Rishon LeZion–Moshe Dayan towards Ashkelon
