= Tel Aviv railway station =

Tel Aviv railway station may refer to:

- Tel Aviv HaHagana railway station, the southernmost station in the city
- Tel Aviv HaShalom railway station, one of the busiest stations in Israel
- Tel Aviv Savidor Central railway station, the city's main station
- Tel Aviv South railway station, two former stations in the city
- Tel Aviv University railway station, the northernmost station in the city
