= Jaffa–Jerusalem railway =

Railway line in Israel

Coordinates: 31°45′40.88″N 35°3′0.13″E

External videos
- Beit Shemesh to Jerusalem (YouTube) – Train driver's view of the line in the mountainous section of the railway in 2015

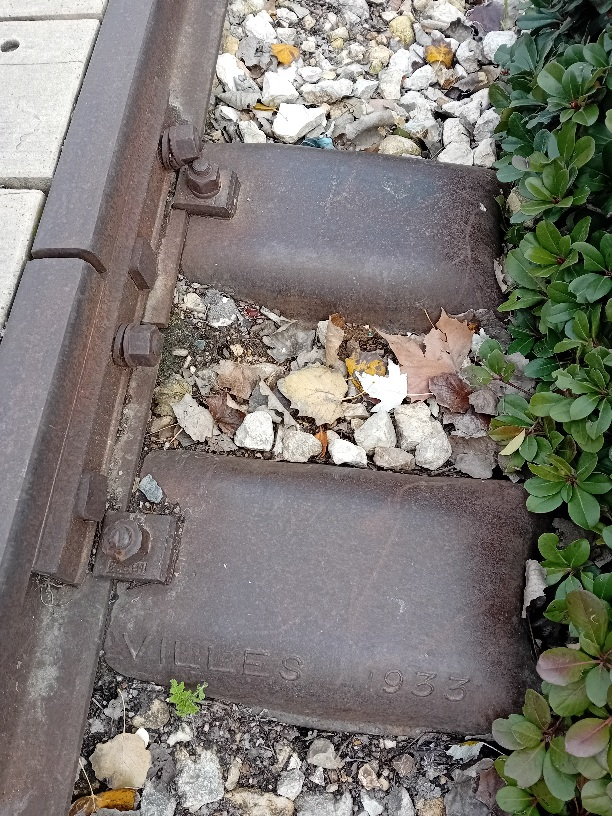
Jerusalem Rail and Ties, showing the year 1933 manufacture

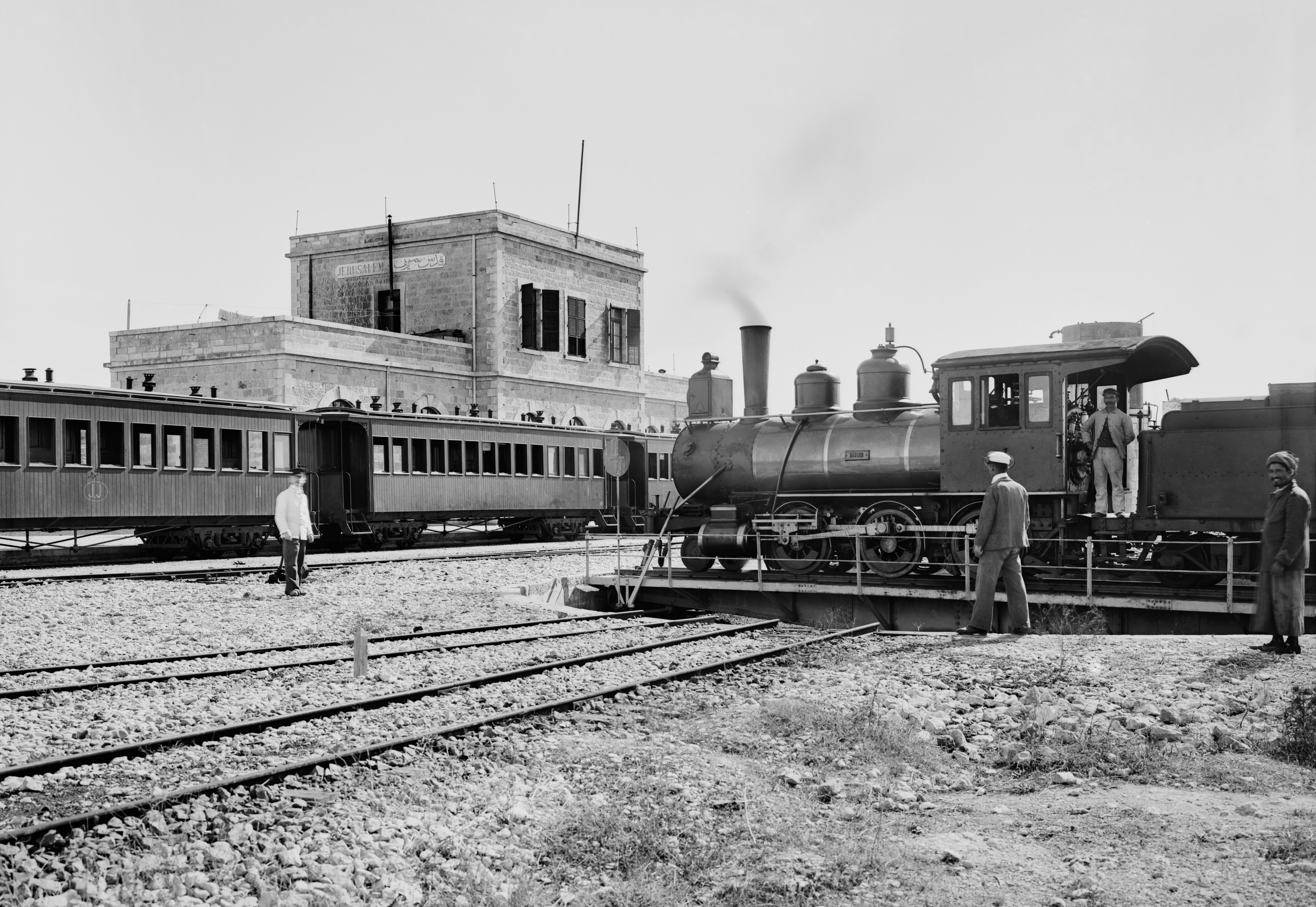
Jerusalem Railway Station c. 1900. The locomotive on the turntable is "Ramleh" (J&J #3), a 2-6-0 built by Baldwin in 1890.

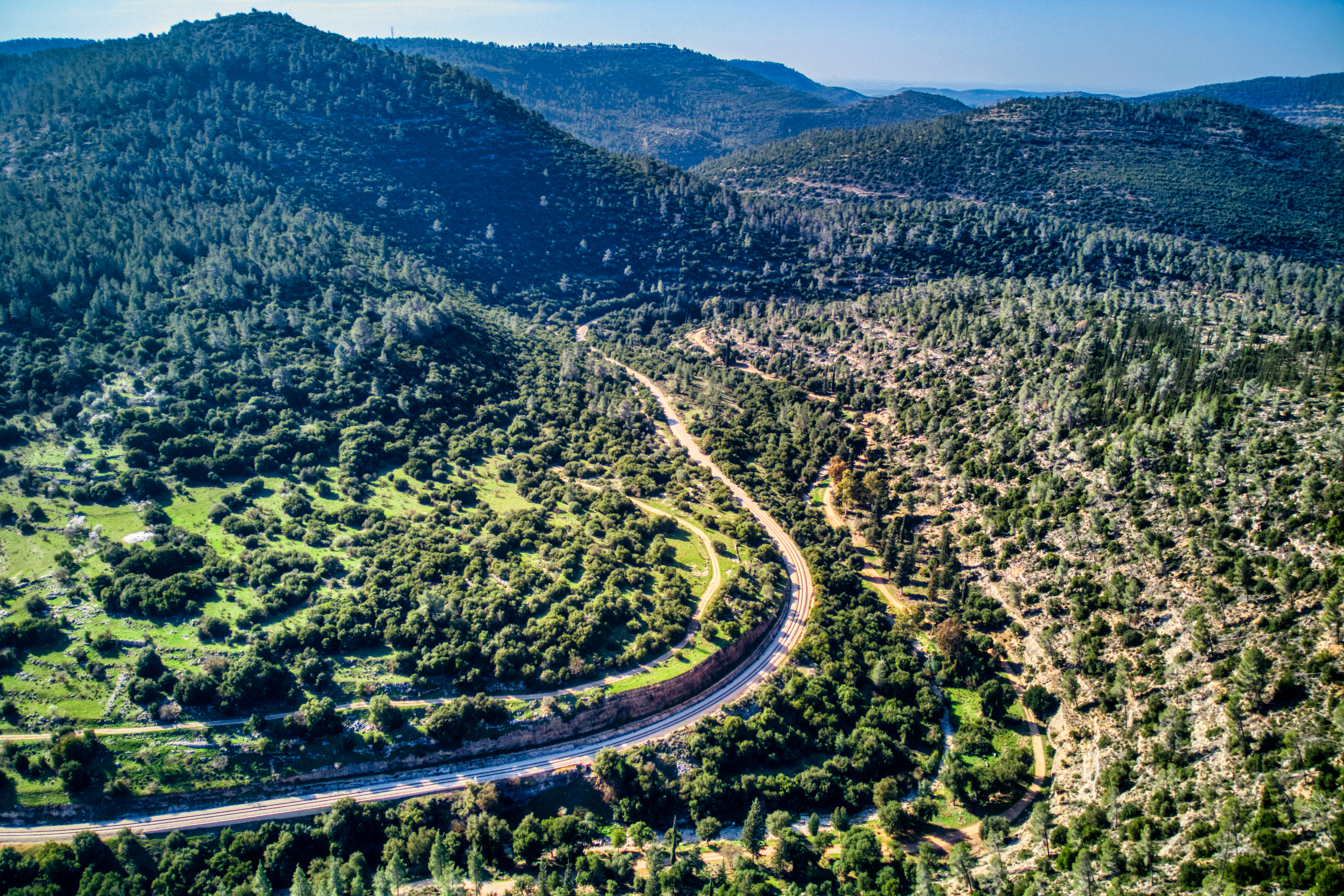
The railway in Nahal Refaim at the foot of Mount Giora

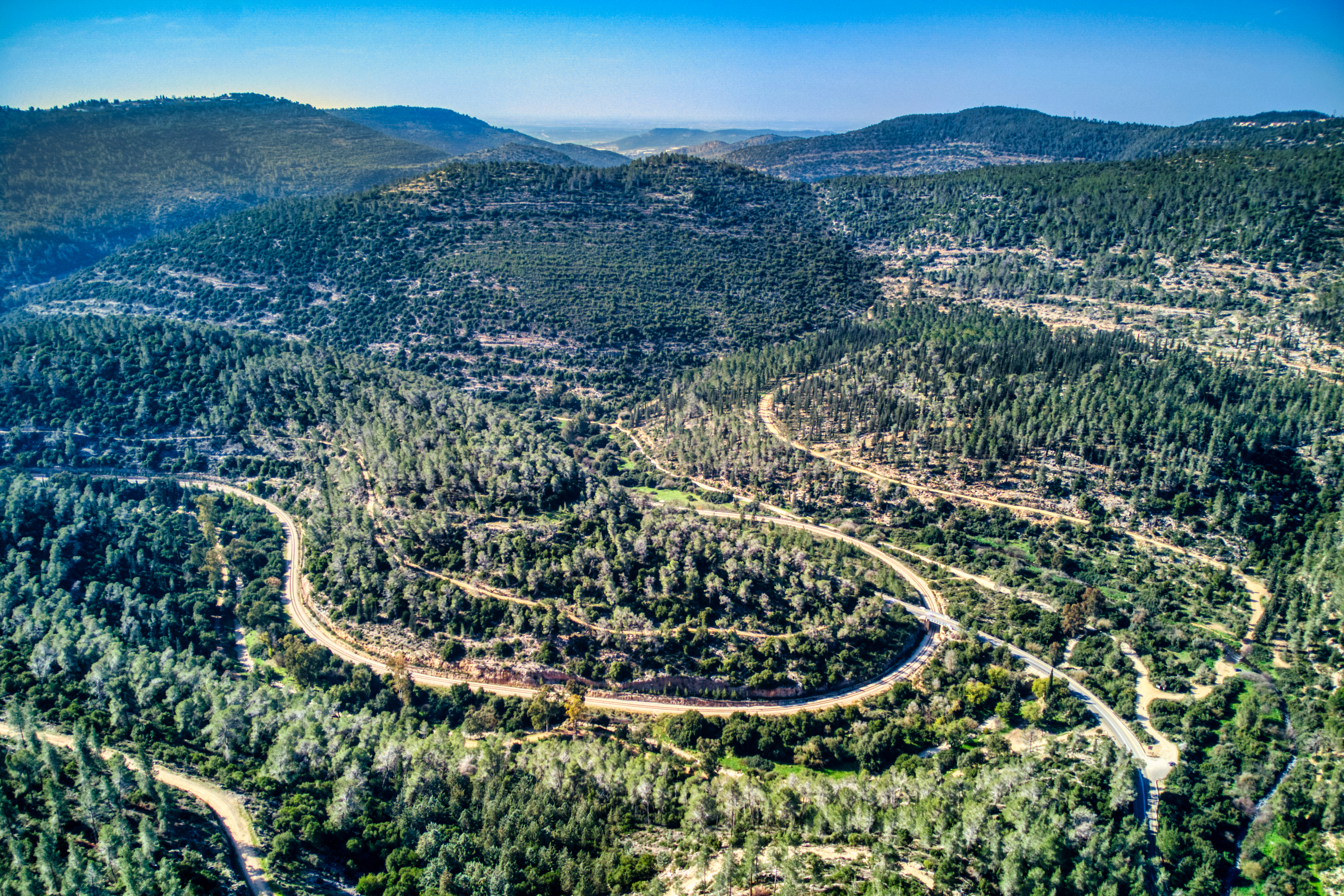
Refaim Bridge where the railroad passes under Route 386 at the place where the Valley of Rephaim flows into the Valley of Sorek

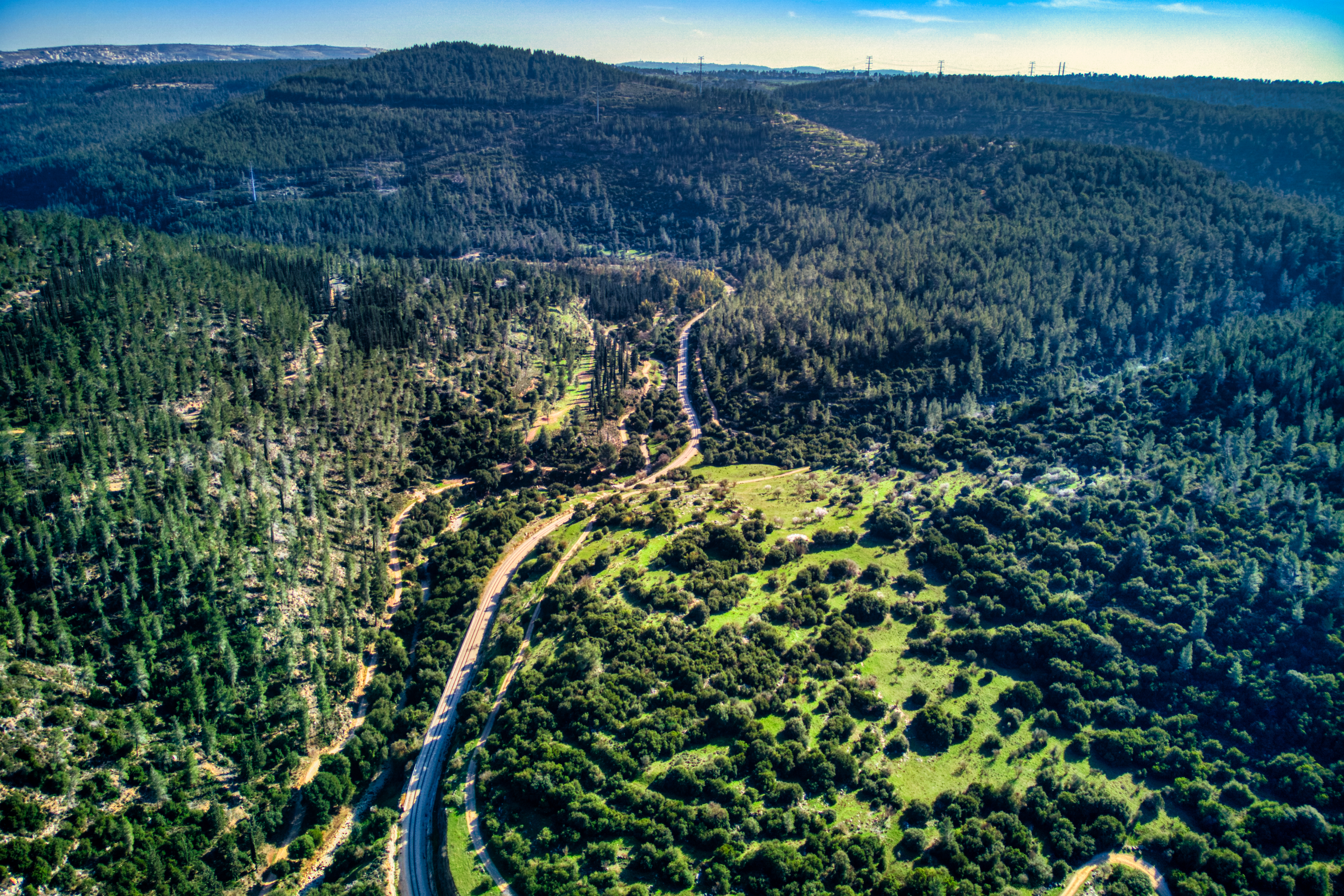
The railway in Nahal Refaim near Mount Refaim

The Jaffa–Jerusalem railway (also J & J) is a railway that connected Jaffa and Jerusalem. The line was built in the Mutasarrifate of Jerusalem (Ottoman Syria) by the French company Société du Chemin de Fer Ottoman de Jaffa à Jérusalem et Prolongements and inaugurated in 1892. The project was headed by Joseph Navon, an Ottoman Jewish entrepreneur from Jerusalem, after previous attempts by the British-Jewish philanthropist Sir Moses Montefiore failed. It is the second railway inaugurated in the Middle East after the İzmir–Aydın Railway, which opened in 1856.

The railway was originally built in 1,000 mm (3 ft 3 3/8 in) metre gauge, later rebuilt to 1,050 mm (3 ft 5 11/32 in) and then to 1,435 mm (4 ft 8 1/2 in) standard gauge. The line was operated by the French, the Ottomans and after World War I, the British. After its closure in 1948, it was re-opened by Israel Railways in 1949 as the Tel Aviv – Jerusalem railway, although since 2019 this designation is instead used to refer to the Tel Aviv–Jerusalem railway – an electrified dual-track railway line constructed during the 21st century that employs extensive bridging and tunneling along a faster, more direct route between the two cities.

== History ==
=== Early proposals ===
Sir Moses Montefiore spoke of establishing a railway between Jaffa and Jerusalem in 1838. He met with Culling Eardley, who was also interested in the project, but stated that he would not be part of it if religious institutions would be involved. In 1856, he contacted the British prime minister, Lord Palmerston, and discussed the construction of a railway. Temple supported the plan, commenting that it would benefit both Britain and Turkey. A meeting was organized with the Ottoman Grand Vizier Aali Pasha upon his visit to London on May 20, 1856, where an agreement on the principles was signed. As a result, Laurence Oliphant, an author and businessman who became a Member of Parliament in 1865, also put his force behind the project. On December 8, 1856, Count Paweł Strzelecki, also involved in the project, sent a message from Istanbul that the Ottoman government was not willing to provide land for the construction, and the project withered.

In 1856, General Francis Rawdon Chesney traveled to Palestine to survey the land for a railway in the company of Sir John McNeil, a railway expert. After examining two possible routes, he deemed a rail line to Jerusalem too expensive, estimating construction costs at 4,000–4,500 pounds per kilometer. McNeil then proposed a short line from Jaffa to Lydda only, and a macadam road from there to Jerusalem (which would cost only 150 pounds per kilometer). Chesney did not give up, contacting Sir Arthur Slade, a general in the Ottoman army, who supported the plan for a railway in what is today Iraq. Slade opposed a Jaffa–Jerusalem line, which he believed would benefit England and be against Turkey's interests. Although Montefiore was involved in it, nothing came of Chesney's initiative. According to another account, Montefiore backed out of the project when Culling Eardley reiterated during a meeting that the railway would serve Christian missionary activity.

On his fifth visit to the Holy Land in 1857, Montefiore brought with him a British railway engineer who proposed the construction of the railway along the Refa'im Stream, to reduce construction costs and to allow the railway to be close to a source of water. He lost interest in the project in 1862, however, when his wife died on Rosh HaShana. In 1864, the German-American engineer Charles Frederick Zimpel proposed building several railways in the Syrian province (including Palestine) to the Ottoman authorities, that would allow the start of construction if Zimpel would be able to gather the necessary funds within half a year. In 1865 Zimpel published a pamphlet with his own survey of the region, including a French-language map of the planned route, which was very similar to the route used today. The main differences were two sections near Jaffa and Ramla, changed from the original plan for convenience, that lengthened the line by about 6.5 km. Zimpel spent a year in Constantinople attempting to gain a concession for the railway's construction, to no avail.

The German architect and city engineer Conrad Schick, a Jerusalem resident, later published a similar booklet, where he also detailed his own proposal for a railway, which called for a line through Ramallah and Beit Horon. A route along the lines of Schick's plan was for a long time considered the most viable, and French engineers conducted an extensive survey to that end in 1874–75. The concept of a railway to Jerusalem was also thought of by the American writer James T. Barclay; he envisioned a line from el-Arish, Askalon or Gaza. Another proposal was made by the engineer Humann, who surveyed the area suggested in 1864 that it would be wise to create a railway to Jerusalem.

Because of perceived British interest in the project, France and Austro-Hungary also became interested. The Ottoman Empire rejected Montefiore's plan on the assumption that it would mainly serve Christian missionary interests. Nevertheless, the local press reported on the proposed railway in 1872 and praised the Turkish Sultan for his efforts to promote its construction. The original failure of the Western powers to construct the railway is attributed to the unwillingness of the respective Western governments to allocate funds for the project, despite their political interest.

=== Financing ===
The man principally responsible for actually constructing the railroad was Yosef Navon, a Jewish entrepreneur from Jerusalem. Navon began to investigate the possibility of constructing a railway in 1885. His advantage over earlier proposers of a railway was that as an Ottoman subject. Navon's chief partners and endorsers included his cousin Joseph Amzalak, the Greek Lebanese engineer George Franjieh, and the Swiss Protestant banker Johannes Frutiger.

Navon spent three years in Constantinople to promote the project and obtain a permit from the Ottoman Empire. On October 28, 1888, he received a 71-year concession (firman) from the Ottoman authorities that also gave him permission to extend the line to Gaza and Nablus. He also paid 5,000 Turkish lira to the Ottomans, and agreed to receive no financial guarantees. Lacking the capital to proceed, Navon went to Europe in 1889 to find a buyer for the concession, and failed to do so both in England and Germany. Bernard Camille Collas, a French lighthouse inspector, bought it for a million francs (40,000 pounds). On December 29, 1889, the Jaffa to Jerusalem Railway Company (Société du Chemin de Fer Ottoman de Jaffa à Jérusalem et Prolongements) was founded in Paris with Collas as the first director. The total share capital was four million francs in 8,000 shares.

Navon sat on the board of directors, which mostly consisted of French investors. The company raised 14 million francs, of them 9,795,000 francs (390,000 pounds) from Christian religious followers. Construction was carried out by the Parisian Company for Public Works and Construction (Société des Travaux Publiques et Constructions), at a cost of 10 million francs (400,000 pounds), and was to be completed by April 1, 1893. Gerold Eberhard, from Switzerland, was selected to be the chief engineer for the project.

While the railway was considered a rare collaboration between Jews, Catholics and Protestants (J. Frutiger), Jewish publications expressed concerns that the line was not serving Jewish interests. A prominent European Jew, H. Guedella, wrote in The Jewish Chronicle that the line was funded by "extreme orthodox Catholics", and the Hebrew newspaper Havatzelet reported a disappointment that no Jewish backers for the line had been found. When the project ran out of money, Navon secured more funds from investors in Germany, Belgium and Switzerland. However, by 1892 the line's shares dropped below their nominal value. He tried to raise more funds, including from Theodor Herzl, although the latter was not interested and wrote that it was a "wretched little line from Jaffa to Jerusalem [which] was of course quite inadequate for our needs."

=== Construction ===
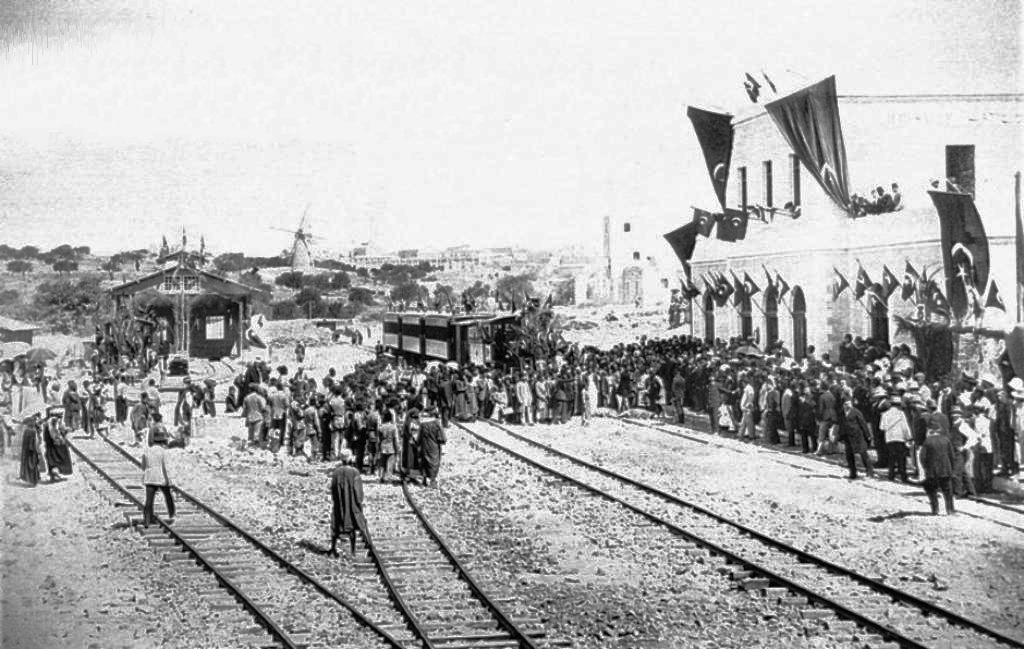
The first Jaffa–Jerusalem train arriving in Jerusalem

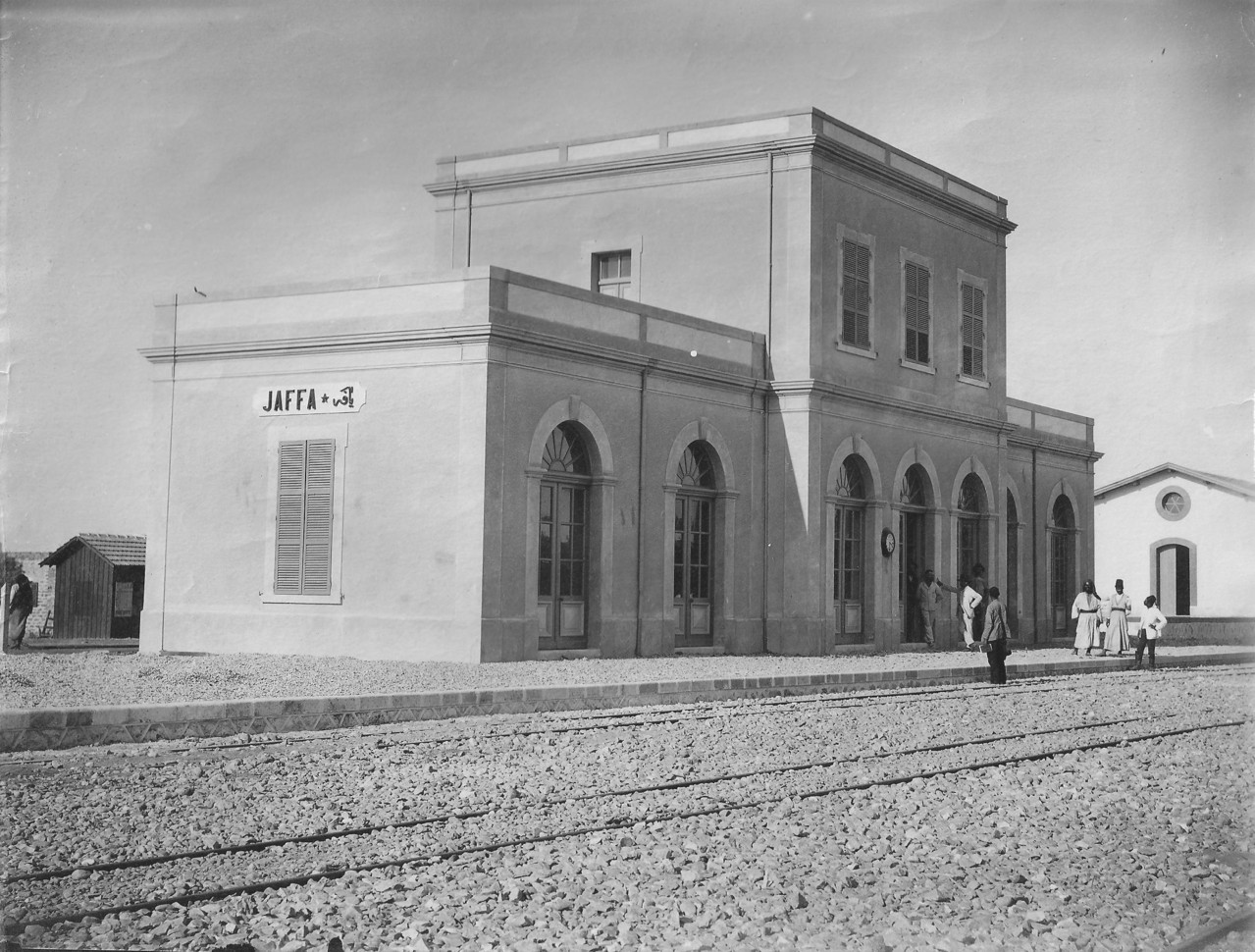
Jaffa Railway Station, 1891

The groundbreaking ceremony took place on March 31, 1890, in Yazur, attended by the governor of Palestine, Ibrahim Hakkı Pasha, the Grand Mufti of Gaza, Navon, Frutiger, etc. The track was chosen to be of 1,000 mm (3 ft 3 3/8 in) metre gauge, similarly to French minor railways, and was brought in from France and the Belgian manufacturer Angleur. According to the New York Times, the materials for the railroad, as well as the rolling stock, were bought from the Panama Canal Company owned by Ferdinand de Lesseps, although the stamps on the rails suggest that they were created in Belgium, which, according to Anthony S. Travis, disproves the Panama Canal theory. A short 600 mm (1 ft 11 5/8 in) gauge section, as well as a meter gauge section with a pier, was laid between the Port of Jaffa and the Jaffa Station to easily transport materials from the harbor to the railway.

Engineers were brought from Switzerland, Poland, Italy and Austria, while construction workers were brought mostly from Egypt, Sudan and Algiers. Native Palestinian Arabs were also heavily involved in the work, although many were farmers and worked only during certain seasons. Stonemasons from Bethlehem and Beit Jala helped construction in the Judean hills. Despite receiving medical treatment, a considerable number of workers died of malaria, scurvy, dysentery and other diseases. More died of construction accidents, including the process of cutting through rocks on the approach to Jerusalem. Numerous bridges were built along the line. The shorter ones were of stone, while six of the seven longer ones were iron, supplied by the Eiffel company. Water for the railway's operation was taken from wells in Jaffa, Ramla and Bittir, and a spring at Sejed. Bittir also supplied the Jerusalem station with water.

The first test run was made on the railway in October 1890, an event that was attended by some 10,000 onlookers—more than half of the population of Jaffa. The locomotive was a Baldwin 2-6-0, one of the first three built for the line, and carried the American and French flags. The Jaffa–Ramla section was fully opened to the public on May 24, 1891, and a further section to Dayr Aban was opened on December 4 of the same year. In Jaffa and Jerusalem, the French railway company sought to build the stations as close as possible to the old cities, while the Ottoman authorities prevented them from doing so, resulting the terminuses' relative distance (for the time) from the city centers. Despite this, the land that the stations were built on was purchased at very high prices by the railway company.

The first train reached Jerusalem on August 21, but the tracks immediately near the station had not yet been completed. The first passenger trip between the Jaffa and Jerusalem stations took place on August 27. Building the railway was a very ambitious undertaking under local conditions. Hundreds of tons of rails were brought from Belgium, coal from Britain and rolling stock from France. Unloading these materials in Jaffa's primitive harbor was an immense challenge. A report in Railway Magazine of 1902 said:

It is a wonder that all the materials for the railway were safely and without loss conveyed to their destination... Such difficulties were greatly increased when it came to dealing with articles like steel rails or heavy iron castings, which the Arabs were not accustomed to handling. Bulky, but light articles, such as boiler barrels or water tanks, were thrown into the sea and tugged ashore; all other materials had to be landed by lighters. A temporary jetty was built of wood and stone near the site of the proposed railway station for the purpose of receiving the materials (which were imported free of duty), but in one night this jetty was swept away by a particularly bad storm.

— A. Vale (1902): The Jaffa-Jerusalem Railway. In: The Railway Magazine, Vol. 10, pp. 321–332; cited in Travis, Anthony S. (2009), p. 42

Vale also wrote that the sleepers were made of oak, laid 50 cm apart, and were 22 cm-wide. The rails weighed 20 kilograms per meter and were fastened to the sleepers with spikes.

=== 1892–1914 ===
The line officially opened on September 26, 1892. The length of the journey was approximately 3.5–6 hours, about equal to the same trip on a carriage, and contrary to the original plan, which envisioned a 3-hour trip. Even so, the opening event received media coverage worldwide. Yosef Navon, who had already been awarded the French Legion of Honor for his involvement in the railway, received a Turkish medal, and in 1895 or 1896—the title of Bey.

In 1892, the railway posted a financial deficit, with daily gains being about 20% lower than the daily construction expenditures. Freight income made up for about two thirds of the total. The investors and companies involved in the project were facing difficulties, especially Frutiger's bank, which caused the elimination of Navon's investments. Tourist traffic was lower than expected, and maintenance problems arose. The trip time was often extended to 6 hours, which only allowed one train per direction per day. A Jerusalem–Jaffa train left in the morning, and returned to Jerusalem in the afternoon. In A Practical Guide to Jerusalem and its Environs, a guidebook written around that time, E. A. Reynolds-Ball wrote: "It requires only an ordinary amount of activity to jump out and pick the flowers along the line, and rejoin the train as it laboriously pants up the steep ascent — a feat I myself have occasionally performed."

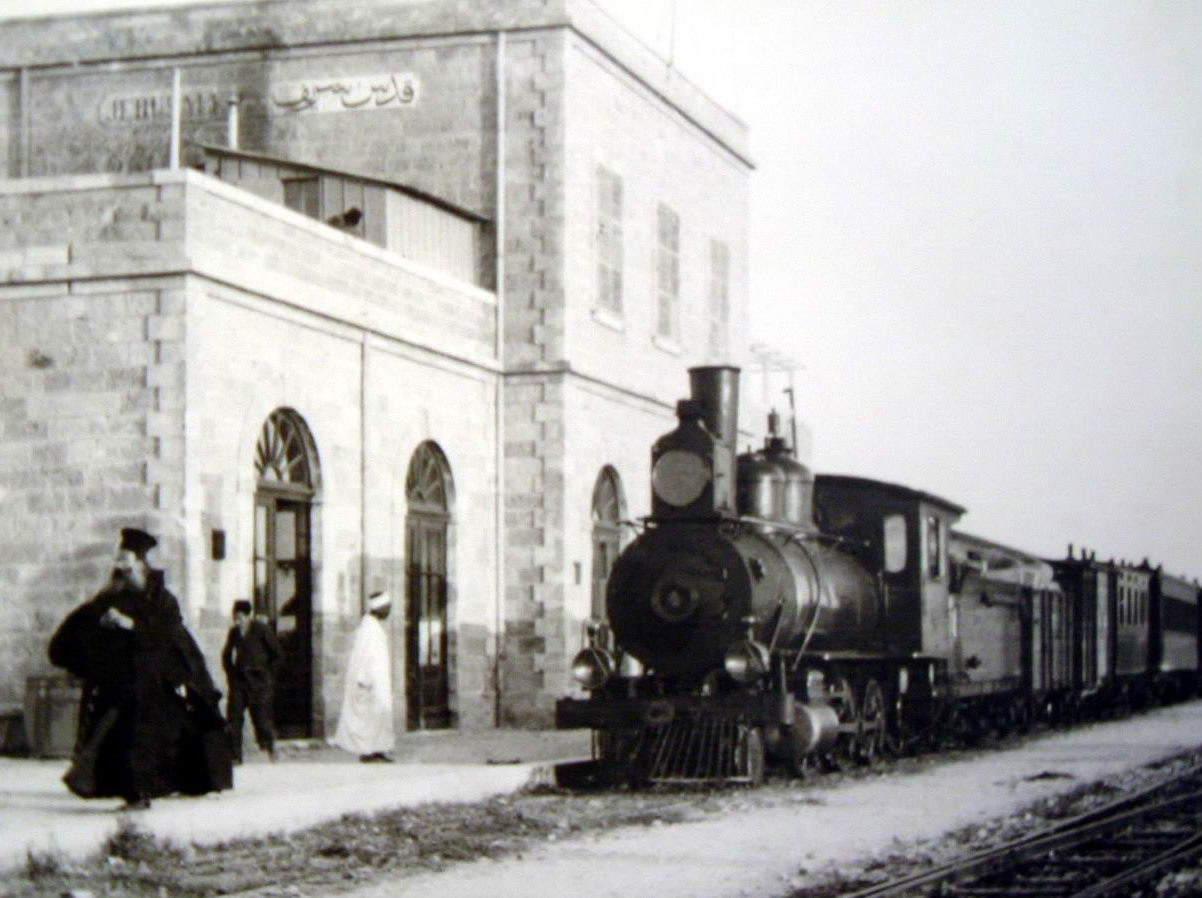
Jerusalem Station c. 1890s

In May 1894, in light of all the problems, the Société du Chemin de Fer Ottoman de Jaffa à Jérusalem et Prolongements went through a new financing initiative and attracted numerous investors. The reorganization paved way for increased efficiency on the line and tourism increased, although Ottoman restrictions on Jewish land purchase and immigration had a negative effect on traffic. There was also a cholera outbreak that hurt tourism. Freight traffic increased by about 50% between 1893 and 1894. In 1895, improvements were made to the track and a bridge was built in Jaffa that became known as the Chelouche Bridge, on the other side of which the Chelouche family helped found Neve Tzedek. The railway became profitable by 1897, however, Selah Merrill wrote in 1898 that the line was in a state of bankruptcy. Moreover, while the traffic from Jaffa to Jerusalem was high, on the way back there were very few passengers and little freight.

Theodor Herzl visited Palestine in October 1898 and was not impressed by the Jaffa–Jerusalem railway. He did not consider it important to the Zionist enterprise, although Zalman David Levontin, another Zionist leader, did, and created a plan to purchase the railway in March 1901. Jewish settlement in Palestine benefited the railroad in any case. Baron Edmond de Rothschild funded several villages along the line, which contributed to its financial development. In Jerusalem, Boris Schatz founded an arts and crafts school in 1906 to cater to the tourists' souvenir needs, which later became the prestigious Bezalel Academy of Arts and Design.

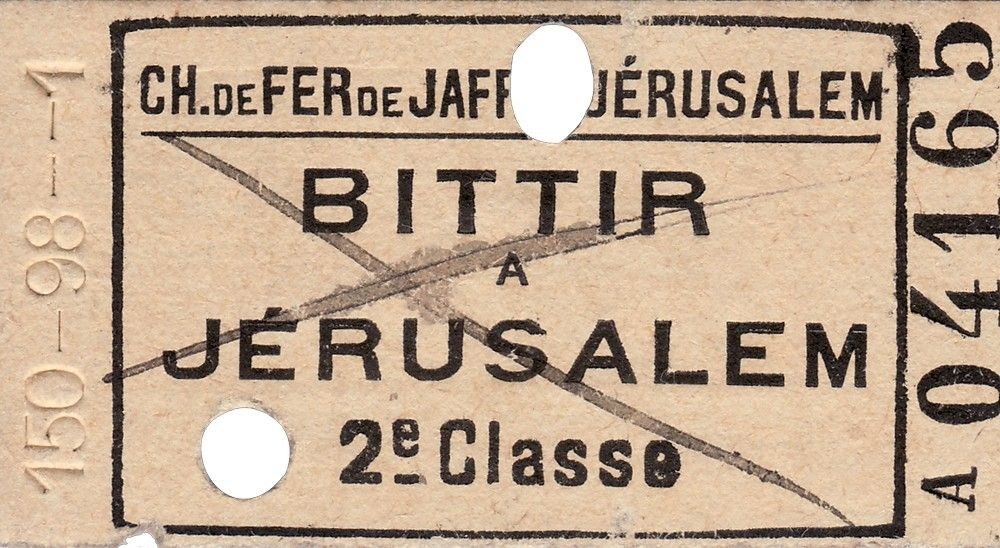
Used ticket (recto, in French)

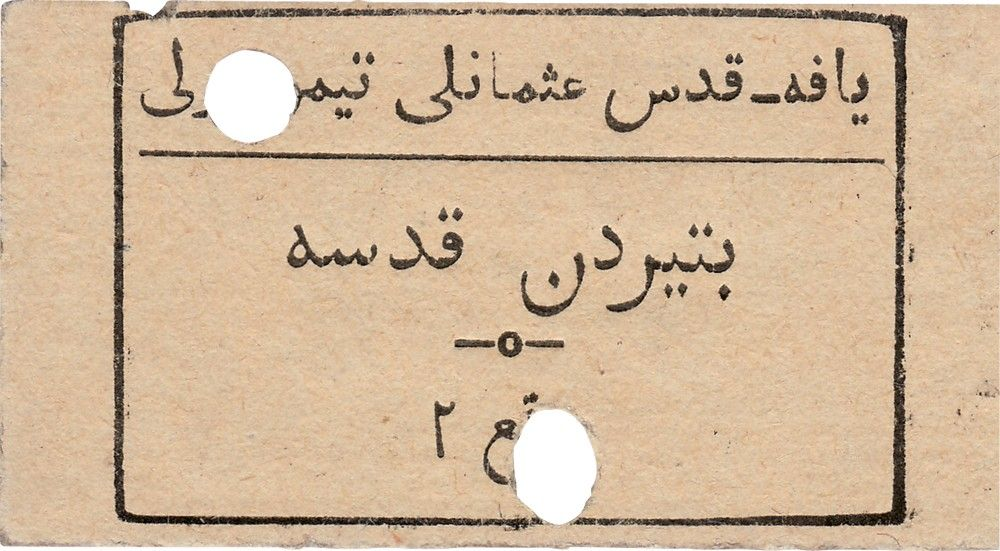
Used ticket (verso, in Ottoman Turkish)

The line showed an overall growth trend between 1896 and World War I, impeded mainly by the Sixth cholera pandemic which spread to Palestine in 1902 and again in 1912, and the increasingly nationalistic Ottoman authorities. By 1903, it became clear that more locomotives were needed for the tourist seasons. The railway company ordered a 0-4-4-0 mallet locomotive from Borsig of Germany in 1904, which entered service in 1905. Two more came in 1908. The last such engine, built in 1914, was likely captured by Britain during the war, and never made it to Palestine.

=== World War I ===
During the Sinai and Palestine Campaign of World War I, the railway was taken over by the Turkish and German armies, which adapted it to serve their needs. The German engineer Heinrich August Meissner was put in charge of its operations. While the Jaffa Railway Station served as a military headquarters during the war, the Ottomans did not want to expose the railway itself to British naval bombardment. In early 1915, most of the heavy machinery and equipment was moved to Jerusalem, and later in the same year the Jaffa–Lydda section was completely dismantled. Its rails and sleepers were used in the construction of the railway to Beersheba. The Lydda–Jerusalem section was re-laid to 1,050 mm (3 ft 5 11/32 in) gauge, and Lydda was connected to the Hejaz railway via the Eastern Railway and the Tulkarm branch of the Jezreel Valley railway.

When the British advanced northwards in November 1917, the railway was sabotaged by Austrian saboteurs from the retreating Central Powers army and most (five) of its bridges were blown up. The Turks carried away anything that was movable, from railway cars and wooden rails to parts of the stations. It was however still valuable to the British, as it provided the only viable link from Jerusalem to Egypt, as the roads were in disrepair. Trestle bridges were installed instead of the destroyed iron ones, and the first British train reached Jerusalem on December 27, 1917. In February 1918, a Decauville 600 mm (1 ft 11 5/8 in) gauge railway was built from Jaffa to Lydda, with an extension to the Auja River, the front line at the time. This extension was furthered to the Arab village al-Jalil (today the Glilot area), and continued to be used until 1922–23 mainly for transporting construction materials, without locomotives. Another extension was built from the Jaffa station to the port, which operated until 1928.

A second Decauville line was constructed in Jerusalem, winding around the mountains close to the Old City, continuing to al-Bireh in the north. This railway was initiated by General Allenby after a Turkish counter-attack on the British in Jerusalem, who had recently occupied the city. Construction began in May 1918 and completed in September of the same year, by which time it was useless because the front had moved northwards. This short line passed in today's Knesset and Biblical Zoo area. A further narrow gauge extension, at 762 mm (2 ft 6 in) gauge was built by the British from Lydda to Tira and Lubban, partly adjacent to the existing 1,050 mm (3 ft 5 11/32 in) Turkish line.

The locomotives used on the railway were converted to 1,050 mm gauge by the Turks during the war so that they could be used on the entire network in Palestine. Of them, five survived the battles—two Baldwin 2-6-0s (#3 and #5) and three Borsig 0-4-4-0s (#6–8). Locomotive #3, "Ramleh", was badly damaged, although it was repaired using spare parts of the other broken-down engines. It survived until 1930, although it likely remained unused following the end of the war.

=== Under the British Mandate ===
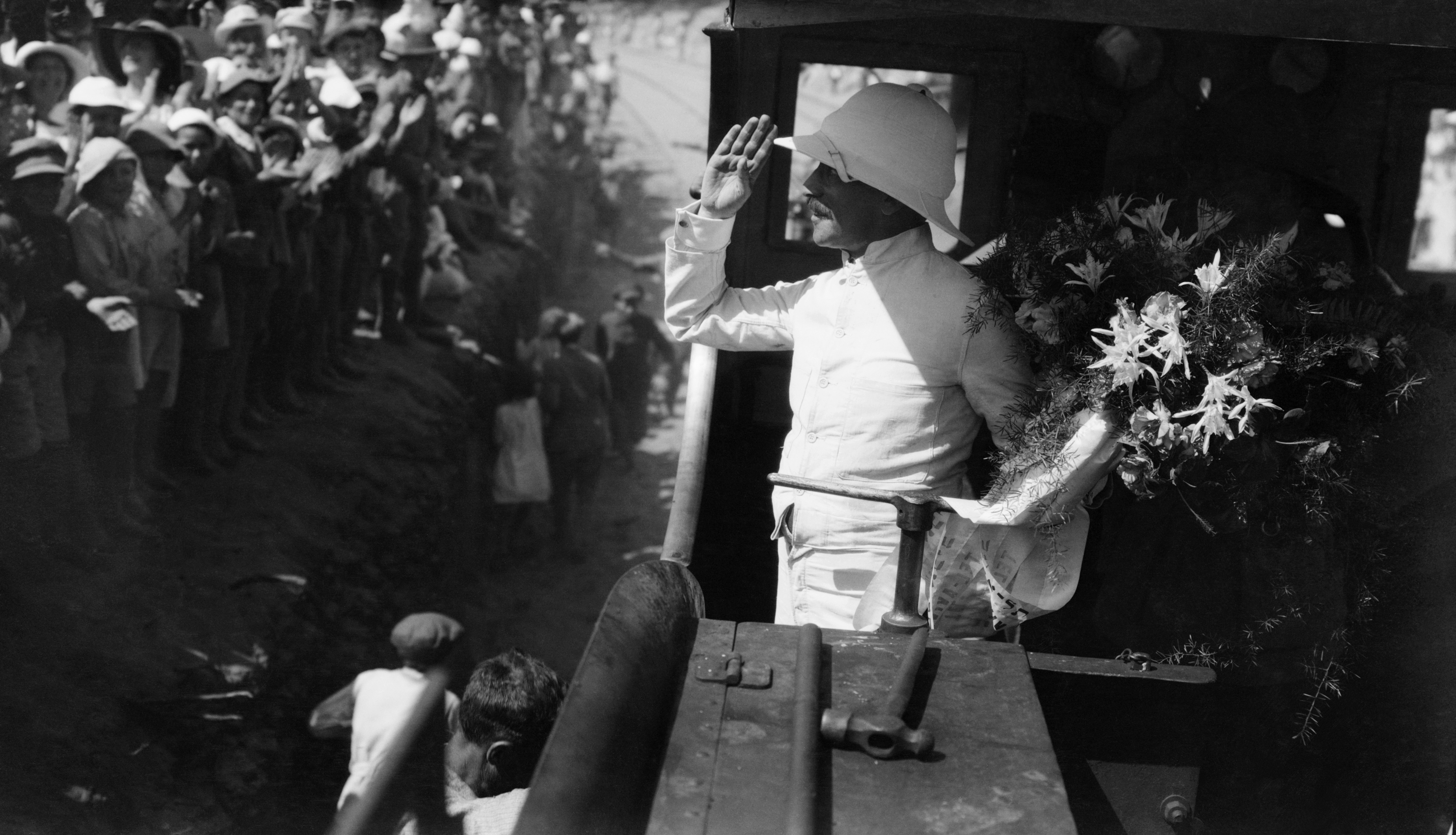
The British High Commissioner, Herbert Samuel, re-inaugurating the line on October 5, 1920

Because the line was still narrow-gauge and incompatible with other British lines, proposals were brought forward to deliver locomotives and coaches from either the Sudan or Australia. However, the Palestine Military Railways, the British operator now managing the railroad system, decided to rebuild the line to the wider 1,435 mm (4 ft 8 1/2 in) standard gauge, an operation that lasted between January 27 and June 15. The final section, between Jaffa and Lydda, was completed in September 1920, and inaugurated in a ceremony attended by Herbert Samuel, the British High Commissioner, on October 5.

Between the end of the war and 1920, the railway was used almost exclusively for military purposes. However, food was delivered to Jerusalem by the British authorities shortly after the war ended. In June 1919, a civilian passenger service began operating between Haifa and Jerusalem, and by February 1920, there was an option to travel from Jerusalem to Egypt via transfer at Lydda. During this period the Zionist movement had demanded rights to the railway from France, as it was not British property. The British countered by asserting that France was Britain's ally during the war. However all inline civilian operations met with strong French opposition; France disapproved of British civilian control of the Mandate. To the French, Britain's answer was that since the original French line was rebuilt, the line was in fact British property.

Following years of discussion, in April 1920 the civilian Palestine Railways took over the line. On October 4, 1922, the two sides signed an agreement whereby Britain would compensate the line's original French operators for £565,000, reduced from the original French demand of £1.5 million. The coastal railway now extended from El Kantara to Haifa, intersecting the Jaffa–Jerusalem line with a junction at Lydda. In 1921 a luxury on-demand service was initiated between Jerusalem and Qantara, Egypt, but it was not popular. It was superseded by a more successful luxury service between Qantara and Haifa on the coastal railway.

The Jaffa-Jerusalem line was maintained and operated by the British military until October 1921 and from then on by the internationally sanctioned British Mandate authorities of Palestine. The High Commissioner treated the line as the core artery of Palestine making an especial effort to ensure that it would remain state property, controlled and managed by the state-run Palestine Railways. However the future of the Jaffa–Jerusalem railway was linked with the prospects of its electrification. The exchanges between High Commissioner Samuel and Pinhas Rutenberg – holding the concession for the electrification of Palestine – resulted in perfect agreement: both sought to secure a London-approved government commitment to the line's electrification. Rutenberg declared that electrification of the railways was essential for the successful electrification of the country as a whole. The High Commissioner, writing to the Colonial Office, emphasized that "it is an integral part of the scheme that the Railway between Jaffa and Jerusalem should be electrified and that the electric energy for the line should be supplied by the Concessionaire." Nonetheless, the Colonial Office and the Treasury in London baulked at the prospective investment rejecting the project on grounds of economic feasibility.

On April 1, 1923, ticket costs were significantly reduced, increasing the line's daily usage from tens to hundreds of passengers. However, by the late 1920s the line declined again due to competition from the nearby road which could now be traversed by car or bus.

=== Tel Aviv – Jerusalem line ===
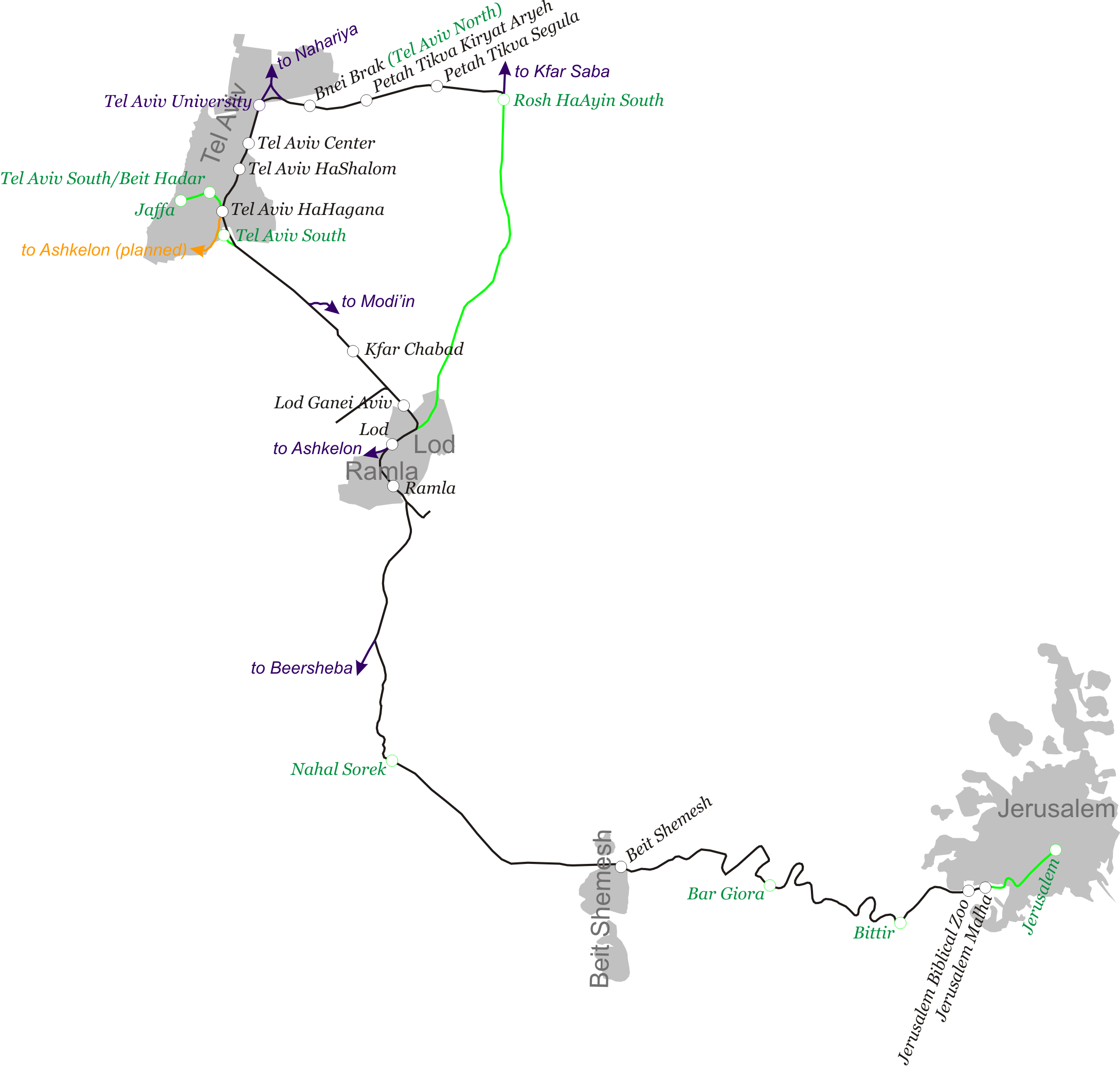
Map of the route of the line after 1949, with historical extensions in green

During the 1948 Arab–Israeli War, the service was stopped. After the war's end, many sections of the line ended up under the Jordanian Arab Legion's control. Following the 1949 Armistice Agreements, the entire route was returned to Israel, and officially restarted operations on August 7, 1949, when the first Israeli train, loaded with a symbolic shipment of flour, cement and Torah scrolls, arrived at Jerusalem. Israel Railways began regular passenger service on March 2, 1950, from Tel Aviv North Railway Station, via the Eastern Railway and Rosh HaAyin, to Jerusalem. Shortly thereafter, regular service using the railway line leading from southern Tel Aviv too was restored.

Even though in the late 1950s Israel Railways began using diesel locomotives, and repaired the line, it did not convert it to a dual-track configuration and travel time was still high. The Jaffa Railway Station was abandoned, and the final destination on the coast was changed to Tel Aviv's Beit Hadar Station (the original Tel Aviv South station), which in turn was changed to the newer Tel Aviv South station, marking the complete dismantlement of the line inside Tel Aviv's urban area. The reasons cited were the fact that the line was causing traffic jams in the city, and the high land value of the area for real estate development. Then-transportation minister Shimon Peres was a prime supporter of the cancellation of the line inside the city and worked to create a new station (Tel Aviv South) in an unused plot of land given to Israel Railways by the government in compensation for the areas inside Tel Aviv it gave up.

The railroad suffered numerous terrorist attacks during the 1960s prior to the Six-Day War, especially due to its proximity to the Green Line and the Arab village Battir. On October 27, 1966, one person was injured from a bomb that was placed along the route.

After a modern highway was constructed between Tel Aviv and Jerusalem, train use declined. In 1995, service was cut to one train a day in each direction. On July 12, 1998, the CEO of Israel Railways, Amos Uzani, decided on the complete closure of the line. The last train ran on August 14, 1998.

=== Re-opening (2003–2005) ===
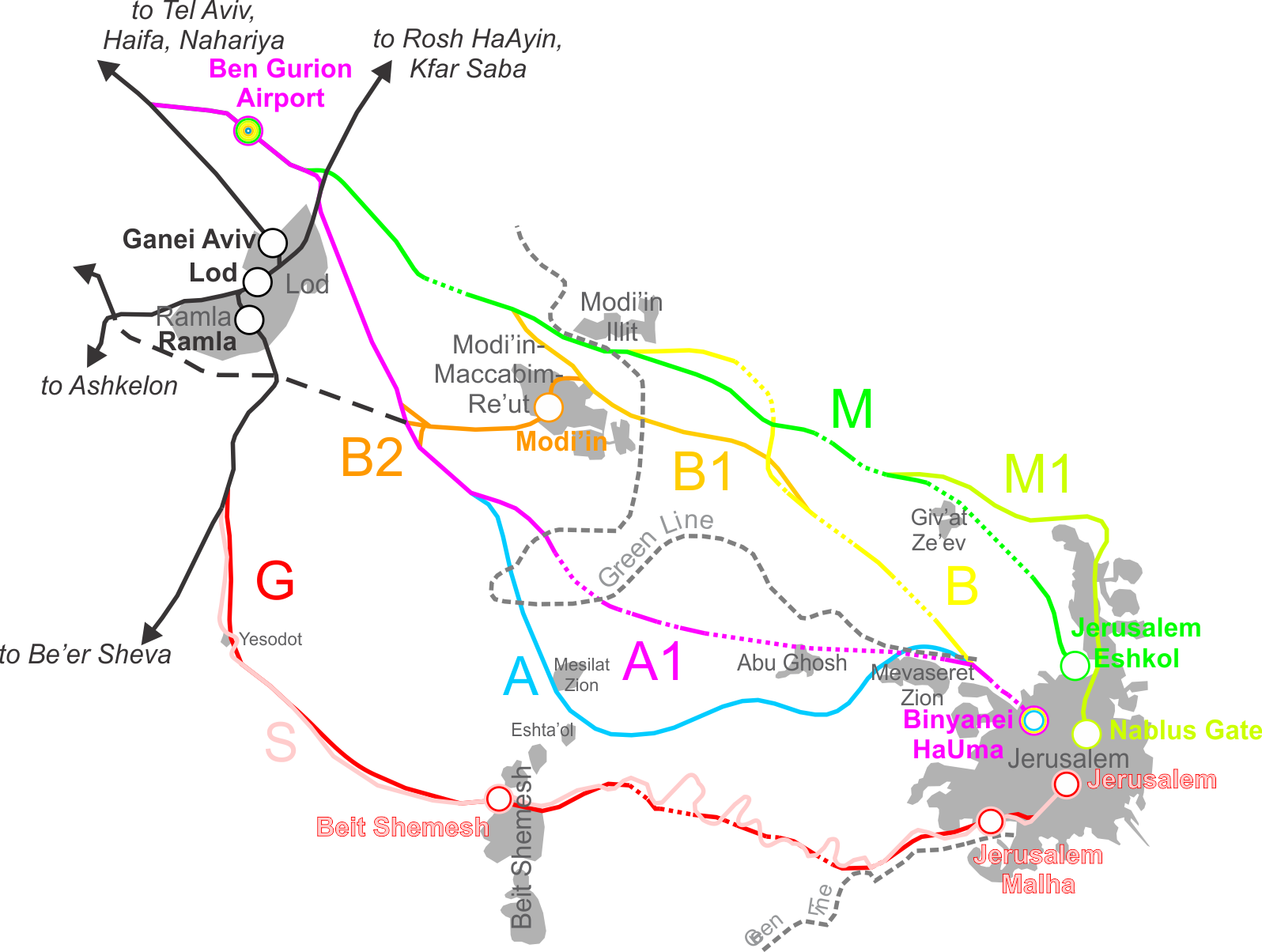
Map of proposed route alternatives between Tel Aviv and Jerusalem. Plan S uses the Jaffa–Jerusalem railway route, although was only implemented as far as Malha station which became the eastern terminus of the line. Plan A1 was eventually implemented as the "high-speed" Tel Aviv–Jerusalem railway.

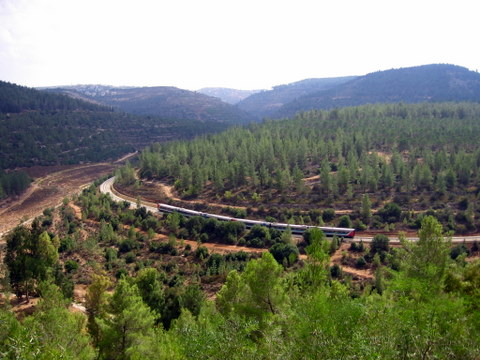
Train on the renovated Beit-Shemesh–Jerusalem section

Uzani petitioned the Minister of Infrastructure, Ariel Sharon to allocate funds for a major repair/reconstruction of the line, but instead the Tel Aviv – Beersheba line was upgraded, with a spur to a new central railway station near the city's central bus station.

Meanwhile, several alternatives were analyzed for the restoration of a railway connection between Tel Aviv and Jerusalem:

- Plans S and S1 – repair of the old route with S maintaining the same serpentine route in the mountains between Beit Shemesh and Jerusalem, with S1 including a few small tunnels and curve straightening in the mountain portion.
- Plans G and G1 – a massive repair of the old route, straightening all the curves by digging numerous long tunnels along the route.
- Plans B, B1, B2, M and M1 – construction of a new line from Tel Aviv to Jerusalem via Modi'in-Maccabim-Re'ut and along the path of Route 443.
- Plans A and A1 – construction of a new line roughly paralleling Highway 1, with a branch to Modi'in (see also: High-speed railway to Jerusalem).

Plans to build a line alongside Route 443 were shelved due to its route through the West Bank. The Municipality of Jerusalem supported Plan G1, while Israel Railways supported Plan S as a quick deployment plan, followed by A1. In June 2001, Transportation Minister Ephraim Sneh and Sharon choose to proceed with Israel Railways' proposal.

On September 13, 2003, the Tel Aviv – Beit Shemesh section and Beit Shemesh Railway Station were re-opened. In April 2005, the second section was initiated with the opening of the Malha station, while the remainder of the route to the more centrally located Khan station was effectively abandoned at the request of the Jerusalem municipality. Ariel Sharon and Benjamin Netanyahu were present in the opening ceremony.

The renovated line encountered many problems, particularly in the Beit Shemesh–Jerusalem section, and was not considered economically viable. It also cost NIS 540 million to build, instead of the planned NIS 330 mln. The winding nature of the mountainous, 19th-century era route between Beit Shemesh and Jerusalem, while scenic, restricts trains' speed and type, and Malha station's location within Jerusalem is not considered ideal, being situated in the town's southern outskirts. In late 2006, a decision was passed down to split the service on the line into two—Tel Aviv – Beit Shemesh, and Beit Shemesh – Jerusalem (taking effect on December 30). This improved conditions and timetable reliability in the first section, which a variety of train types could now traverse, but significantly increased the time between Jerusalem and destinations other than Beit Shemesh, and the line was re-united in the following seasonal schedule. The rebuilding process itself was also criticized, because a number of historic structures were destroyed, including the original Beit Shemesh and Bittir stations, and a stone bridge.

Work has continued to improve the line between Na'an and Beit Shemesh by straightening curves and replacing level crossings with bridges. In February 2009 a crossing between the railway and Highway 3, near moshav Yesodot and the former Nahal Sorek station was replaced with a long railway bridge and a sharp curve immediately following the intersection was straightened. This project may cut down travel time to Beit Shemesh by up to 10 minutes. Another level crossing several kilometers north near Hulda was also replaced by a rail bridge. A separate project to straighten and double-track the line between Lod and Na'an was completed in 2012 as part of the upgrade and reconstruction of the Lod–Beersheba line. The Tel Aviv–Lod section was completely double-tracked by the 1990s and now constitutes part of the main line of Israel Railways. This section is planned to be widened to quadruple-track in the future and besides trains to Beit Shemesh and Jerusalem, it also serves the lines to Ashkelon (via Lod and Rehovot), Ben Gurion Airport, and Beersheba.

The original termini in Jaffa and Jerusalem have been renovated as entertainment centers. The Jaffa station was renovated to such use in 2008, and the Jerusalem one in 2013. Both stations are disconnected from the rail network and no longer serve as train stations, although a portion of the first line of Tel Aviv Light Rail passes through railways laid in the same course as a short stretch of the dismantled railway between Jaffa station and Beit Hadar station. Part of the former right of way in Jerusalem has been turned into a linear park in 2012. In 2020 the same was done with part of the former right of way at the other end in Tel Aviv.

In 2020, following the COVID-19 pandemic and the reduction of train traffic, the line was shut down until further notice. Later, Israel Railways decided not to return and reactivate the line to Jerusalem as a commercial line.

In May 2023, a promotion process began to transform the route from Beit Shemesh to Jerusalem into an intercity train park that includes bike paths and walking paths).

=== New Tel Aviv–Jerusalem railway ===
In 2019, the rail service to Jerusalem was complemented by the new Tel Aviv–Jerusalem railway which was built along the planned A1 route. This new double-tracked and electrified railway terminates at a new underground terminal in central Jerusalem known as Jerusalem–Yitzhak Navon railway station, conveniently located across from the central bus station and adjacent to the Jerusalem Light Rail. Compared to about 75 minutes between Tel Aviv and southern Jerusalem on the Jaffa–Jerusalem railway, service on the new railway from Tel Aviv to central Jerusalem is much faster, taking approximately half an hour between the two cities, while making an intermediate stop at the Ben Gurion Airport railway station.

==== Future connection to Malha ====
In 2020 Israel Railways began the process of seeking approval from the governmental planning committees for a plan (National Infrastructure Plan No.108) to connect Yitzhak Navon and Malha stations along an underground route beneath Jerusalem. This involves continuing the new railway from Navon station to the southeast in the direction of the Old City, then curve to the southwest near the original Jerusalem Railway Station, heading towards Malha station. Two additional passenger stations, both of whom underground, are being considered along this route: Jerusalem–Central (located near the Davidka Square), and a station in the vicinity of the original Jerusalem railway station.

== Stations ==
Stations located on the Israel Railways main line (Nahariya-Haifa-Beersehba-Nahal Tzin) are in Bold.

=== Original stations ===
Name/Location	Other (later) names	Operation	Distance from Jaffa	Elevation	Image	Notes
Jaffa (Yafo)	Elifelet	1892–1948 (mainline rail); 2023–date (light rail)	—	—		Disconnected from the mainline network since 1948; operating as part of the Red Line of the Tel Aviv Light Rail, using new platforms within the station grounds, since 2023
**Lod (Lydda)**	—	1892–date	19.1 km (11.9 mi)	63 m (207 ft)		Rebuilt 1917–1920 and 2016–2020. Also operating as part of the Lod–Ashkelon railway and the Railway to Beersheba
**Ramla (Ramleh)**	—	1892–1998, 2003–date	22.5 km (14.0 mi)	65 m (213 ft)		Rebuilt 2003 and 2012. Also operating as part of the Railway to Beersheba
Al-Sejed (Ayn Sejed)	—	1892–1915	39.5 km (24.5 mi)	110.5–183 m (363–600 ft)		—
Dayr Aban	Artuf (1918–48), Hartuv, Beit Shemesh	1892–1998, 2003–date	50.3 km (31.3 mi)	206 m (676 ft)		Rebuilt 2003.
Battir (Bittir)	—	1892–1948	75.9 km (47.2 mi)	575 m (1,890 ft)		—
Jerusalem	Jerusalem–Khan	1892–1998	86.6 km (53.8 mi)	747 m (2,450 ft)		—
Source: Travis (2009), pp. 74, 78–79

=== Later stations ===
Name/Location	Operation	Elevation	Image	Notes
**Netanya railway station**	1953–date	~20 metres (66 ft)		Not located on the original 1892 alignment of the line Operating as part of the Coastal railway
**Netanya Sapir railway station**	2016–date	~20 metres (66 ft)		Not located on the original 1892 alignment of the line Operating as part of the Coastal railway
**Beit Yehoshua railway station**	1953–date	~20 metres (66 ft)		Not located on the original 1892 alignment of the line Operating as part of the Coastal railway
**Herzliya railway station**	1953–date	~20 metres (66 ft)		Not located on the original 1892 alignment of the line Operating as part of the Coastal railway
**Tel Aviv University railway station**	2000–date	~10 metres (33 ft)		Not located on the original 1892 alignment of the line Operating as part of the Coastal railway
**Tel Aviv Savidor Central railway station**	1993–date	~10 metres (33 ft)		Not located on the original 1892 alignment of the line Operating as part of the Ayalon Railway
**Tel Aviv HaShalom railway station**	1996–date	~10 metres (33 ft)		Not located on the original 1892 alignment of the line Operating as part of the Ayalon Railway
**Tel Aviv HaHagana railway station**	2002–date	~10 metres (33 ft)		Geographically located on the original 1892 alignment of the line, but the railways are part of a separate line Operating as part of the Ayalon Railway
Tel Aviv Beit Hadar (Customs House) Station	1920–1970 (mainline rail); 2023–date (light rail)	~10 metres (33 ft)		Disconnected from the mainline network since 1970; operating under the name Allenby station, as part of the Red Line of the Tel Aviv Light Rail, using new underground platforms under the original station's location, since 2023
Tel Aviv South Station	1970–1993	~20 m (66 ft)		Not located on the original 1892 alignment of the line Now serves as a training site for Israel Railways
**Kfar Chabad Station**	1952–date	~30 m (98 ft)		
Ben Gurion Airport railway station	2004–date	~10 m (33 ft)		Not located on the original 1892 alignment of the line Operating as part of the Ganot–Jerusalem railway, on a spur directly between Tel Aviv HaHagana and Lod
**Lod Ganei Aviv Station**	2008–date	~60 m (200 ft)		
**Na'an Station**	1920s–1992	~90 m (300 ft)		Now serves as a location of a passing loop
Wadi al Surar (Nahal Sorek) Station	1915–1998	~100 m (330 ft)		Now serves as a location of a passing loop
Dayr ash-Shaykh (Bar Giora) Station	1890s–1948	~400 m (1,300 ft)		Now serves as a location of a passing loop
Biblical Zoo railway station	1996–1998, 2005–2020	~750 m (2,460 ft)		
Jerusalem–Malha railway station	2005–2020	~750 m (2,460 ft)		
Jerusalem–Central railway station	Not yet built	~790 m (2,590 ft)		Not located on the original 1892 alignment of the line Station under construction, planned as part of the Ganot–Jerusalem railway extension to Malha; construction began in 2024
Jerusalem–Yitzhak Navon railway station	2018–date	~800 m (2,600 ft)		Not located on the original 1892 alignment of the line Operating as part of the Ganot–Jerusalem railway Connection to the Jaffa–Jerusalem railway is under construction, beginning in 2024

== Significance and impact ==
The railway was the largest civil engineering project in the Palestine region at the time, and is considered to be one of the largest such projects completed to this day. It is largely responsible for opening up Jerusalem to modern tourism, and assisted in the growth of the city beyond the Old City walls. Selah Merrill, in Scribner's Magazine, notes that the real significance of the railway's construction wasn't the 86.5 km of track laid, but the fact that it was done in the Ottoman Empire, which according to him had been attempting at all costs to keep out Western civilization. Land value increased dramatically near the route of the railway, even before its completion. Despite this, the actual area around the Jerusalem Railway Station did not develop quickly, partly because flat and high areas were preferred for construction.

The line did however assist German construction in Jerusalem in the 1890s, allowing them to bring more construction materials more quickly. By the start of the 20th century, the German Colony became an attractive spot for those seeking superior transportation. In addition, it improved public health in Jerusalem considerably, and allowed further expansion, as it allowed the import of large quantities of fresh water into the city from other aquifers. Paul Cotterell wrote that "The coming of the railway had a profound effect on Jerusalem. In the first decade of the line's existence the population of the city almost doubled, which is all the more amazing when considering that Jerusalem at this period produced hardly enough wine, vegetables or cattle for its own needs."

In Jaffa, it was a contributing factor to its population growth to 40,000 by 1900, and had a positive cultural effect. The line also affected local time arrangement, transforming the clock from oriental (where time was counted in hours from sunrise and sunset) to railway time. The line prompted Eliezer Ben Yehuda to write a poem about it, and to coin the words Rakevet (רַכֶּבֶת, "train") and Katar (קַטָּר, "locomotive") for the Hebrew language, suggested by Yehiel Michel Pines and David Yellin, respectively.

Immediately after the railway's construction, plans for similar railway projects all over Palestine were presented. On November 9, 1892, after helping build the main line, the engineer George Franjieh proposed a tramway in Jerusalem, which would connect it to Ein Kerem and Bethlehem—only six weeks after the line's official opening. Three weeks later, on November 28, he presented plans for a similar tramway in Jaffa. The plans were never realized because they were perceived not to be economic. Another plan by Franjieh that was not carried out called for a new water supply system to Jerusalem, which had an inadequate supply for the increased population.

== See also ==
- Baghdad Railway (built 1903–1940), initially a German-Ottoman project
- Narrow-gauge railway#Similar gauges
- Rail transport in Israel
