= Tel Aviv–South railway station =

Former railway station in Tel Aviv, Israel

Tel Aviv–South תל אביב – דרום
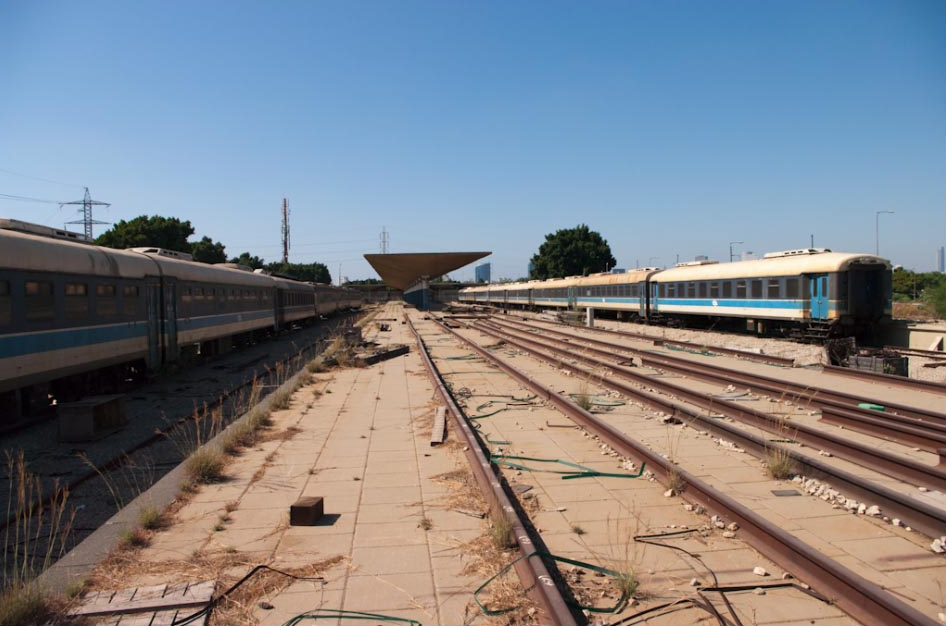
- Tel Aviv South 1970 site photographed in 2008

General information
- Location: David Remez Street, Tel Aviv
- Coordinates: 32.0452°N 34.7866°E
- Owner: Israel Railways
- Line: Tel Aviv–Jerusalem
- Platforms: 2
- Tracks: 4

History
- Opened: 1920
- Closed: First location 1970, Second 1993
- Rebuilt: 1970
- Former names: Custom House Station; Beit Hadar Station

Services
16 daily in both directions (in 1970) to:
Jerusalem railway station
Be'er Sheva North railway station
Location

Tel Aviv–South railway station was the name of two former railway stations in Tel Aviv, Israel, which were situated in two different locations. The original station opened in 1920, then in 1970 it was relocated 2.5 km south-east, and it finally closed to passengers in 1993.

Located east of the historical 1970 station location is the active Tel Aviv South rail yard and stabling point which is situated in the central reservation within the two carriageways of Highway 1, south of Tel Aviv HaHagana Station and the Kibbutz Galuyot Interchange where Highway 1 merges into the Ayalon Highway.

== History ==
=== Original location ===
The station, originally named Tel Aviv Custom House Station, was built in 1920 by the British Mandate Authorities. Its first location (32.0636°N 34.7770°E), at a distance of approximately 2.5 km from the Jaffa railway station, was facing the short Mikveh Israel Street, where the railway had followed a narrow curve between Yehuda Halevi Street and Railway (HaRakevet) Street.

The construction of the station and its adjacent custom house was part of rebuilding the whole Jaffa–Jerusalem railway, which had been damaged during World War I, in standard gauge, rather than the original 1.05 metre gauge. This was one of the first civil engineering works the British carried out, once their governing mandate was established by the League of Nations. The new station and customs house were built to replace the existing Jaffa Customs House, which was old, congested and could not cope with the growing level of cargo traffic at that time.

In 1935, an office building named Beit Hadar (in Hebrew, the "Citrus House"), the first steel frame structure in Tel Aviv, was built next to the station by architect Carl Rubin. From that point on the station was also known as Beit Hadar Station.

During the 1947–1949 Palestine war service on the Jaffa–Jerusalem railway was suspended and only resumed on August 7, 1949 following the signing of the 1949 Armistice Agreement with Jordan.

On September 20, 1949, once the Tel Aviv North railway station was opened (which was later renamed Bnei Brak railway station), the station was renamed Tel Aviv South railway station. At this time it also became a terminus, as the section of track to Jaffa railway station was lifted and the Jaffa station closed.

In 2023, the Allenby station of the Red Line (Tel Aviv Light Rail) opened at the location of the Beit Hadar station.

=== Relocation ===
By the 1960s, the movement of trains on the Jaffa–Jerusalem railway was disturbing the growing vehicle traffic along the major Tel Aviv artery of Petah Tikva Road, later renamed Begin Road, therefore it was decided to relocate the station 2 km further out of town. The new station was opened on 26 November 1970. The tracks between the New Tel Aviv South Station and the original Customs House Station were lifted; however the Station building remained in place, in the central reservation of HaRakevet Street; the station name can still be clearly seen on the building, although the structure itself is now abandoned and neglected.

Although the new station was quite spacious, with a large indoor passenger concourse, 4 platforms and additional sidings, it had only 16 rail services per day when it opened (8 in each direction). The station was poorly used due to its remote location far away from the city centre (unlike its previous location which was much more centrally located). This contributed to a significant drop in passenger traffic and in 1979 the passenger rail service to Be’er Sheva was halted and the service to Jerusalem reduced to one train a day in each direction. However, in 1990, new suburban service to Rehovot railway station was introduced.

=== Closure ===
In 1993, as part of the Ayalon Highway project the railway lines in the Tel Aviv area were re-aligned. New tracks were laid within the highway's central reservation, finally linking the coastal line from Haifa to Northern Tel Aviv with the railway line from Southern Tel Aviv to Lod and from there to Jerusalem, Be’er Sheva and Ashdod (from 2005 also to Ashkelon and Ben Gurion Airport) to the south; thus creating a continuous rail corridor from the north of Israel to the south through Tel Aviv for the first time. Previously, all rail traffic from the north of the country to and from the south had to bypass the entire Tel Aviv metropolitan area from the east. Since the new Ayalon railway bypassed the station, all passenger service to the station was discontinued and moved to the Tel Aviv Central railway station, though Tel Aviv South Station remained connected to the rail network via a short spur to the Ayalon railway. Later, additional stations were built along the Ayalon Highway, including the nearby HaHagana and Holon Junction railway stations.

Today the station is used as a training site for Israel Railways and occasionally as a stabling point.

== See also ==
- Tel Aviv Savidor Central railway station
- Tel Aviv HaShalom railway station
- Tel Aviv HaHagana railway station
- Tel Aviv University railway station
- Jaffa–Jerusalem railway
- Jerusalem railway station
- Jaffa railway station
