= Mordechai Shmuel Ashkenazi =

Orthodox rabbi

Harav Mordechai Shmuel Ashkenazi
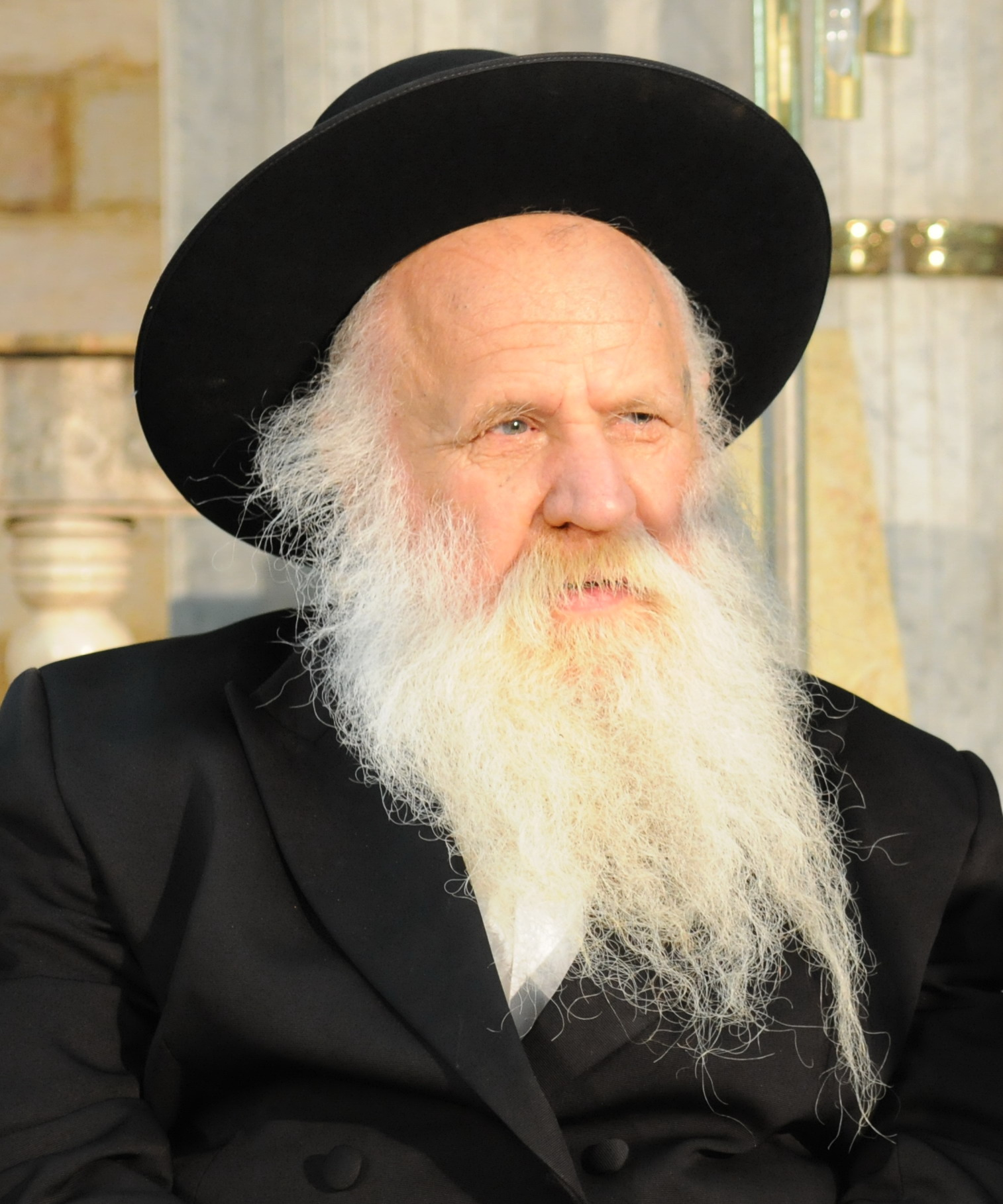

Personal life
- Children: Rabbi Schneur Ashkenazy (Chief Rabbi of Rishon L'tzion); Rabbi Meir Ashkenazy (Chief Rabbi of Kfar Chabad)

Religious life
- Religion: Judaism

Mordechai Shmuel Ashkenazi (Hebrew: מרדכי שמואל אשכנזי; 1943 – January 14, 2015) was an Orthodox rabbi and a member of the Chabad movement of Hasidic. Ashkenazi was the chief rabbi of the Kfar Chabad Chabad community in Israel from 1983 until his death and was an authority on Halakha (Jewish law).

== Halachic stances ==
Ashkenazy said that long wigs were inappropriate for use as a hair covering under the halachik definition of tzniut.

== Family ==
He was a grandson of Rabbi Meir Ashkenazi, former chief rabbi of Shanghai. His son Schneur became the chief rabbi of Rishon L'tzion, Israel.
