= Kfar Chabad =

Town in central Israel

Kfar Chabad: כפר חב״ד (Hebrew)
- Community settlement

Hebrew transcription(s)
  - Official: Kfar Habad, Kefar Habad
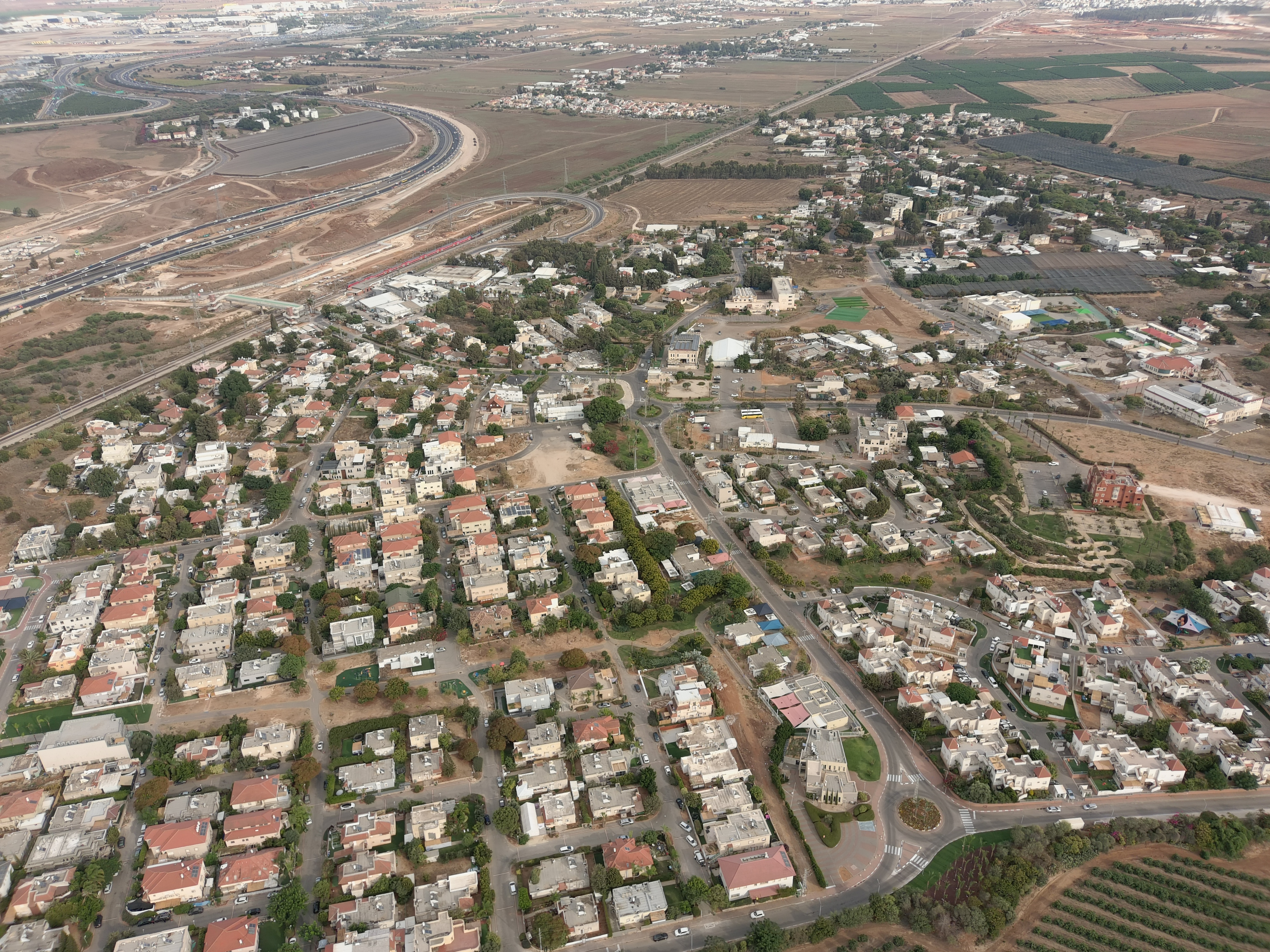
- Etymology: Chabad Village
- Location within Central Israel Location within Israel
- Coordinates: 31°59′19″N 34°51′7″E
- Country: Israel
- District: Central
- Subdistrict: Ramla
- Council: Sdot Dan
- Affiliation: Chabad
- Founded: 1949
- Population (2024): 6,391

Kfar Chabad (Hebrew: כפר חב״ד, lit. 'Chabad Village') is a Chabad-Lubavitch community settlement in the Central District of Israel. Between Beit Dagan and Lod, it falls under the jurisdiction of Sdot Dan Regional Council. In 2024 it had a population of 6,391.

== History ==
Kfar Chabad was established in 1949 by Yosef Yitzchak Schneersohn. The site of Kfar Chabad had previously contained the Palestinian village of al-Safiriyya (known to the Byzantines and Crusaders as Sapharea or Saphyria). During the 1948 Palestine war Al-Safiriyya was depopulated and destroyed as part of the 1948 Palestinian expulsion and flight and the Nakba.

The first inhabitants of Kfar Chabad were mostly recent Jewish immigrants from the Soviet Union, survivors of World War II and Stalinist oppression. Regarding their aliyah, the Jewish Observer reported: “There were several noteworthy aspect of this Aliyah. Chabad members refused all offers of help from religious and political organizations; they insisted on going on the land. Adapting themselves to modern agricultural methods ... To them it was a point of honor to live as they were taught. This meant subsisting only on what they earned by their own toil".

Kfar Chabad, which is just outside Lod and about 8 km southeast of Tel Aviv, includes agricultural lands as well as numerous educational institutions. It serves as the headquarters of the Chabad-Lubavitch Hasidic movement in Israel. Kfar Chabad is a Lubavitch community.

=== Replica of "770" ===
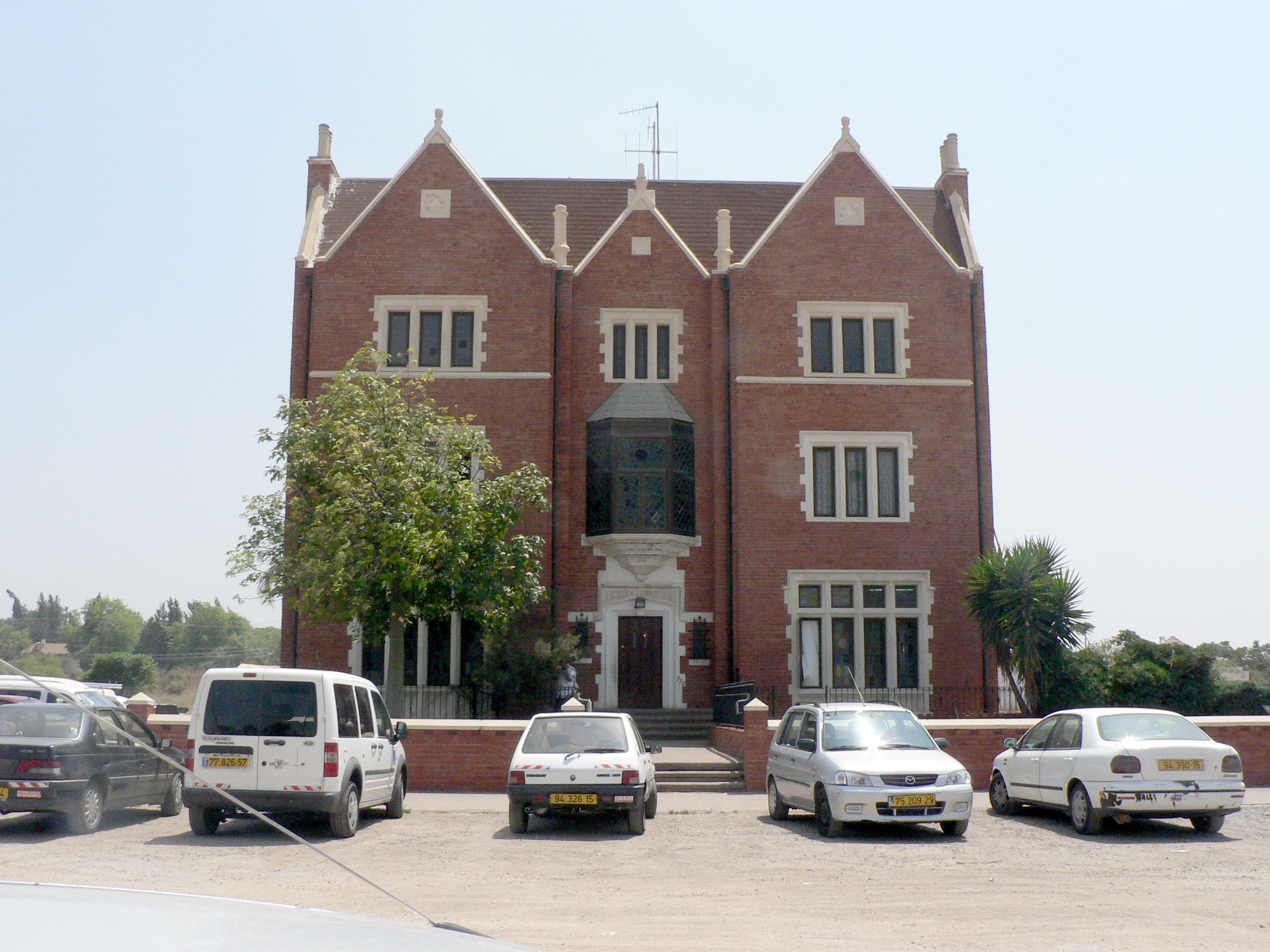
Full-scale replica of "770" in Kfar Chabad

The village features a full-scale replica of "770", the world headquarters of Chabad at 770 Eastern Parkway, Crown Heights, Brooklyn, New York, which was built in 1930's. The building, which serves as a synagogue, includes the same number of bricks as the original structure; the brickwork was produced by Teracotta Ofakim Clay Industries in Ofakim. The Lubavitcher Rebbe covered the US$700,000 building cost.

=== Terror attack at the vocational school ===
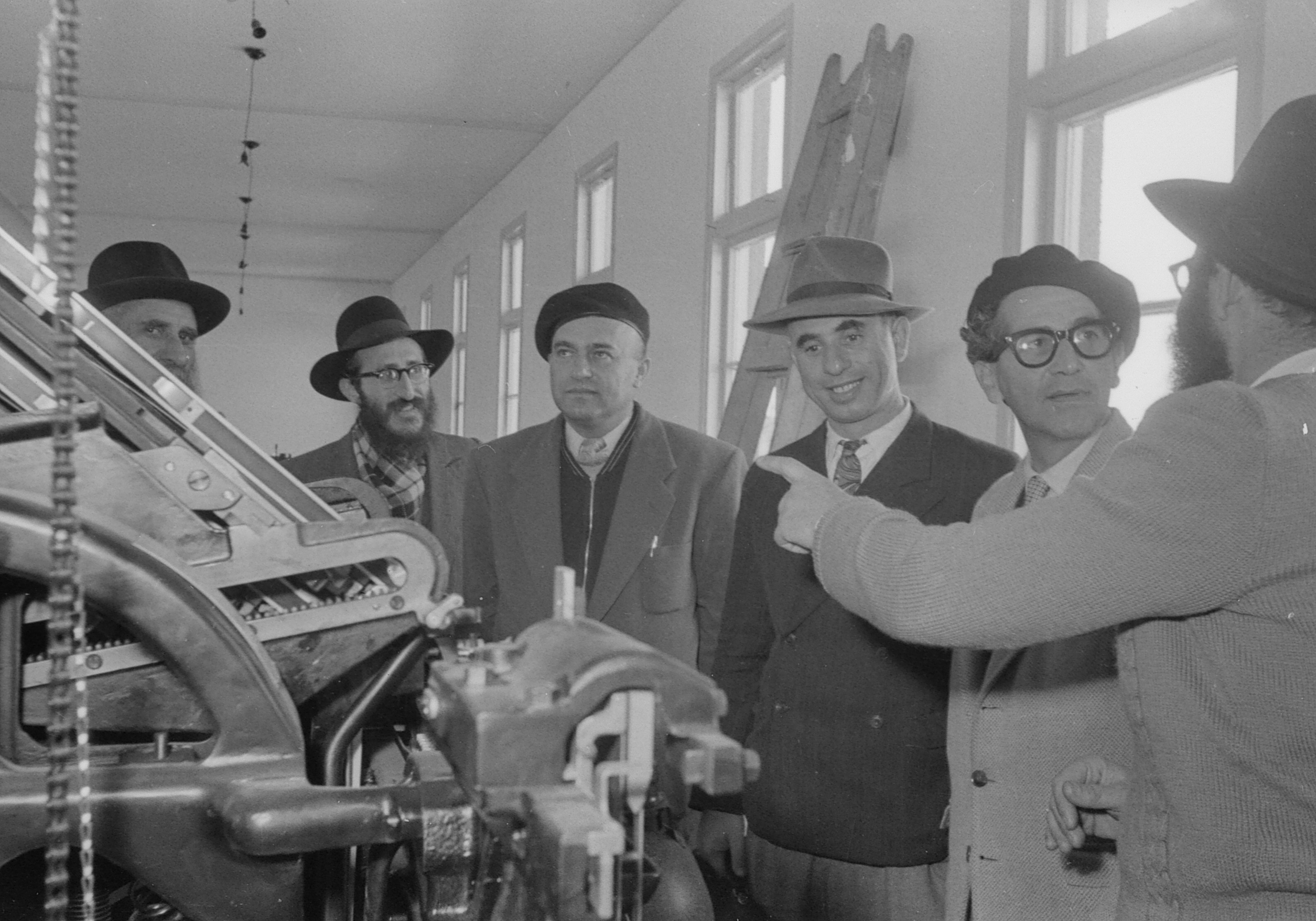

On 11 April 1956, Palestinian fedayeen entered the synagogue in a vocational school during evening prayers and started shooting indiscriminately. Five children and one teacher were killed, another ten injured.

== Railway station ==
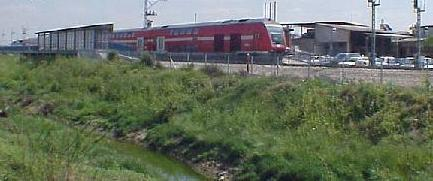
Kfar Chabad railway station

Kfar Chabad has a railway station served by trains on the line between Binyamina and Ashkelon. It was built in 1952 and rebuilt in 1999.

== Education ==
Kfar Chabad provides vocational training in printing, mechanics, carpentry, and agriculture for male students, and education for female students. The programs are combined with religious education. Most students, who come from outside the village, are not Hasidic.

== Political leadership ==
Previous mayors include Shlomo Meidanchik and Menachem Lehrer. The current mayor is Nachmen Richman.

== Religious leadership ==
The village rabbi was Mordechai Shmuel Ashkenazi from 1983 until his death in 2015. The first rabbi was Shneur Zalman Gorelik, from the town's founding until his death.

== Voting Patterns ==
In the 2022 election, 99 percent of voters in Kfar Chabad voted for the parties of the right-wing coalition led by Benjamin Netanyahu, while 1 percent voted for the parties of the center-left coalition led by Yair Lapid and 0.07 percent voted for the Arab parties. 32 percent of voters voted for the Haredi parties of Shas or UTJ, while 56 percent voted for the Religious Zionist Party/Otzma Yehudit joint list.

In the 2026 election, 96 percent of voters in Kfar Chabad voted for the parties of the right-wing coalition led by Benjamin Netanyahu, while 1 percent voted for the parties of the center-left coalition led by Gadi Eisenkot and 0.1 percent voted for the Arab parties. An additional 0.5 percent voted for the Reservists, and 0.6 percent voted for Amcha Yisrael. 55 percent of voters voted for the Otzma Yehudit list, one of its best performances in Israel. Voter turnout increased 8 percent from the 2022 election.

== See also ==
- Kfar Habad railway station
- Diamante citron
