= Jaffa railway station =

Former railway station in Tel Aviv, Israel

Jaffa railway station תחנת הרכבת יפו
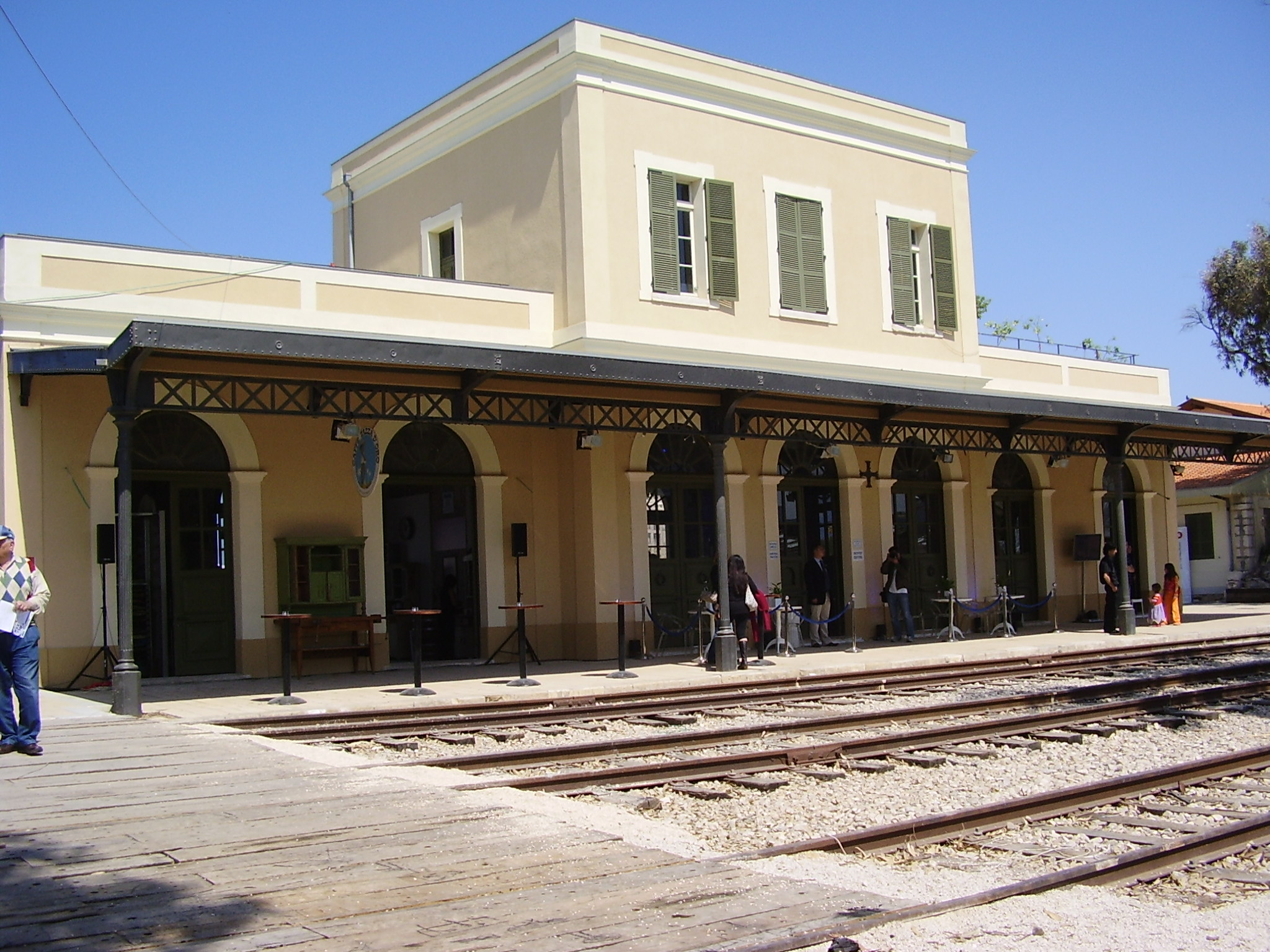
- Restored Jaffa railway station in 2009

General information
- Location: Neve Tzedek, Tel Aviv-Jaffa
- Coordinates: 32.0590°N 34.7614°E
- Lines: Jaffa - Jerusalem (Jaffa); Red Line (Elifelet)
- Platforms: 2
- Tracks: 4

History
- Opened: 24 May 1891; 135 years ago
- Closed: 15 August 1948; 78 years ago
- Rebuilt: 18 August 2023; 3 years ago
- Electrified: 18 August 2023; 3 years ago
Location

The Jaffa railway station was the first railway station in present-day Israel, serving as the terminus for the Jaffa–Jerusalem railway. The station, located in the neighbourhood of Manshiya in Jaffa, was inaugurated in 1891 and closed in 1948. Between 2005 and 2009 the station was restored and converted to an entertainment and leisure venue, branded as The Station (HaTachanah). The Elifelet light rail station in the Red Line is located within the grounds of the historical station, which until 2019 were home to the Israel Defense Forces History Museum.

== History ==
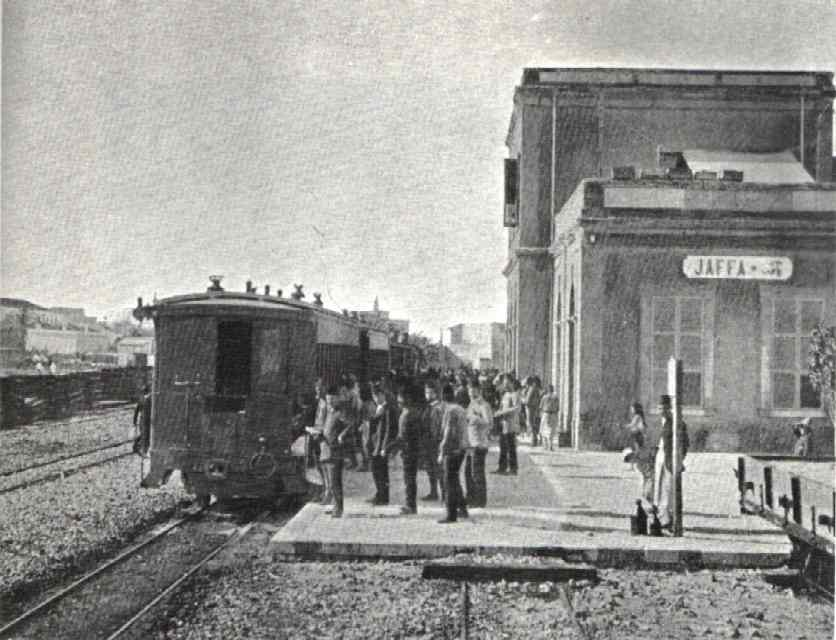
Jaffa railway station in 1892

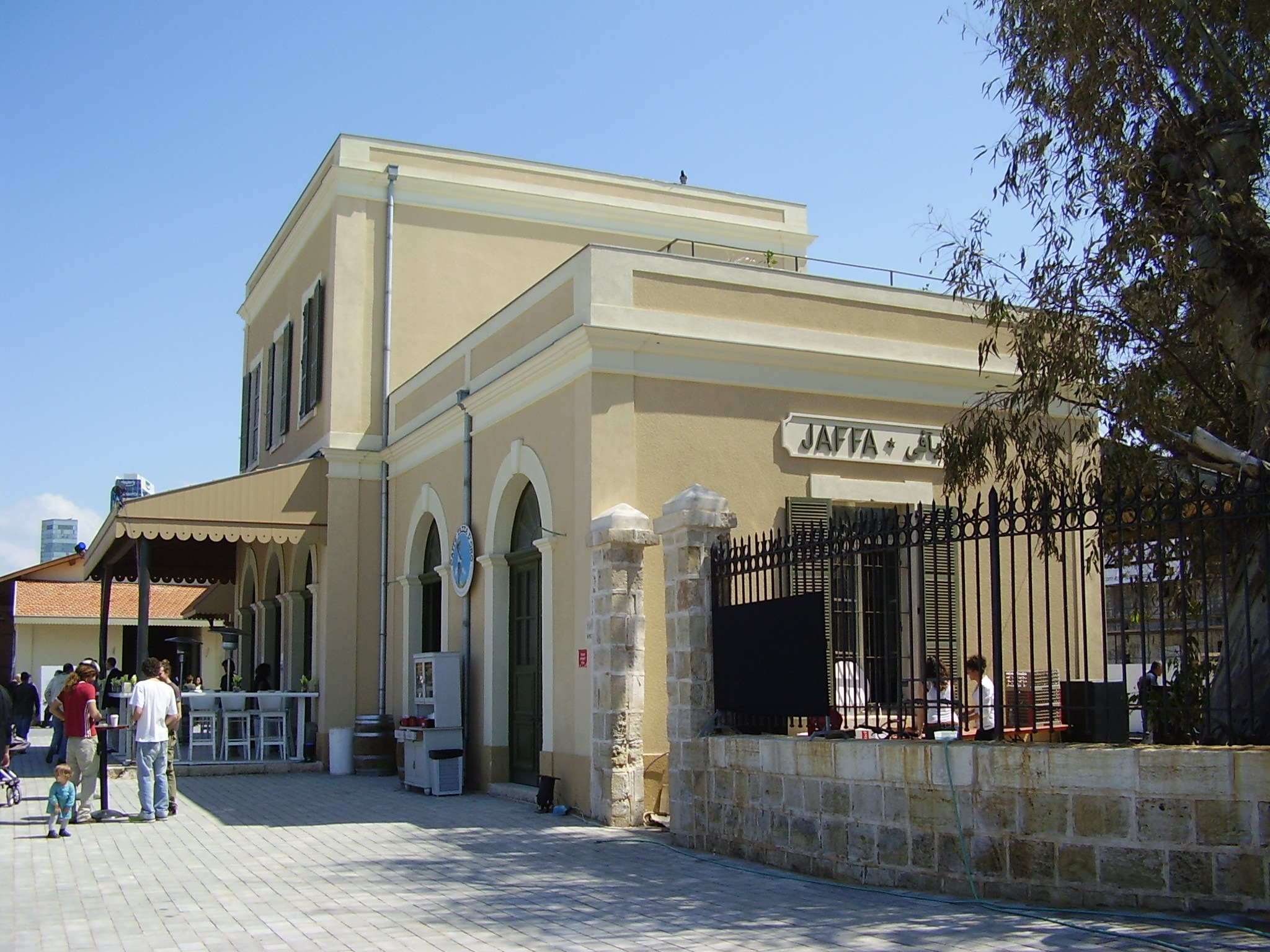
Jaffa railway station in 2009

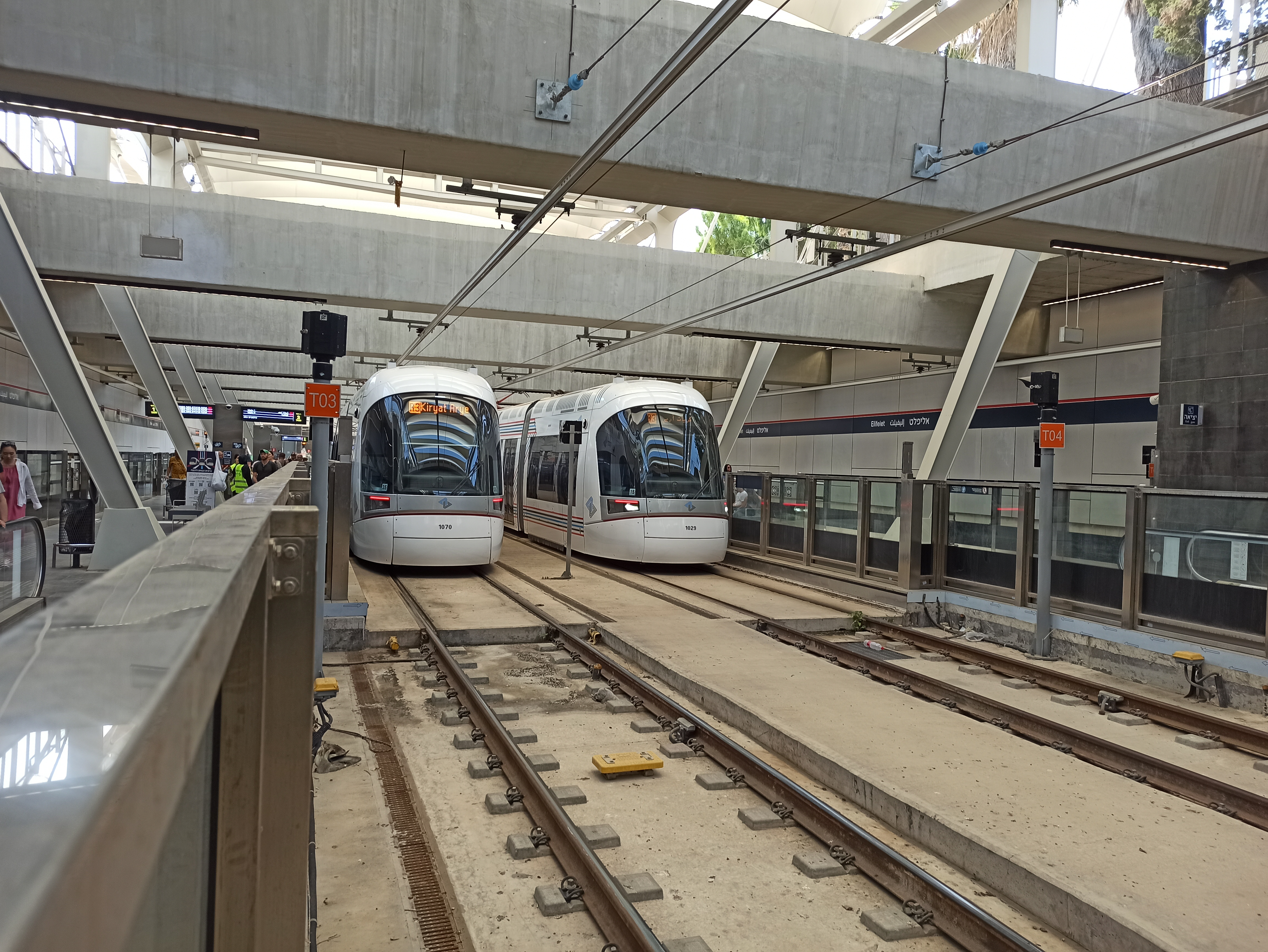
Platforms of the Elifelet Light Rail station, located in the Jaffa railway station, in 2023

=== Ottoman Empire ===
==== Construction ====
The idea to build a railway linking the coast with Jerusalem was first raised in the middle of the 19th century by Dr. Conrad Schick, Sir Moses Montefiore and others. The franchise for laying the railway was obtained from the Ottoman government by Joseph Navon, but due financial difficulties, he had to sell the franchise to a French company which was set up to build the line – the Société du Chemin de Fer Ottoman de Jaffa à Jérusalem et Prolongements.

The groundbreaking ceremony took place on March 31, 1890. The track was chosen to be of 1,000 mm (3 ft 3 3/8 in) metre gauge, similar to French minor railways, and was brought in from France and the Belgian manufacturer Angleur. A short 600 mm (1 ft 11 5/8 in) gauge section, as well as a meter gauge section with a pier, was laid between the Port of Jaffa and the Jaffa Station to easily transport materials from the harbor to the railway.

The first test run was made on the railway in October 1890, an event that was attended by some 10,000 onlookers—more than half of the population of Jaffa. The locomotive was a Baldwin 2-6-0, one of the first three built for the line, and carried the American and French flags. The section between Jaffa and Ramla railway station was fully opened to the public on May 24, 1891, and a further section to Dayr Aban was opened on December 4 of the same year. The stations were built just a short time before the track was laid in their respective areas. In Jaffa and Jerusalem, the French railway company sought to build the stations as close as possible to the old cities, while the Ottoman authorities prevented them from doing so, resulting the terminuses' relative distance (for the time) from the city centers. Despite this, the land that the stations were built on was purchased at very high prices by the railway company. The station in Jaffa was built in immediate vicinity of the German Templer colony, and even named Sarona Station on a British map from the late 1910s, to distinguish from a Jaffa Station at the seafront, the terminus of a short narrow-gauge extension.

In 1892, construction of the whole line from Jaffa to Jerusalem was completed. The length of the journey was approximately 3.5–4 hours, about equal to the same trip on a carriage, and contrary to the original plan, which envisioned a 2-hour trip. Even so, Yosef Navon was granted several high-profile awards for his efforts, and the opening event received extensive media coverage worldwide.

==== World War I ====
During World War I, the railway was taken over by the Turkish and German armies, which adapted it to serve their needs. While the Jaffa railway station served as a military headquarters during the war, the Ottomans did not want to expose the railway itself to British naval bombardment. In early 1915, most of the heavy machinery and equipment was moved to Jerusalem, and later in the same year the Jaffa–Lydda section was completely dismantled. Its rails and sleepers were used in the construction of the Railway to Beersheba.

When the British advanced northwards in November 1917, the railway was sabotaged by the retreating Turkish army and most (five) of its bridges were blown up. The Turks carried away anything that was movable, from railway cars and wooden rails to parts of the stations.

=== British Mandate ===
The station proved still valuable to the British, as it provided the only viable link from Jerusalem to Egypt, as the roads were in disrepair. Trestle bridges were installed instead of the destroyed iron ones and a 600 mm (1 ft 11 5/8 in) gauge railway was built from Jaffa to Lydda, with an extension from Mikveh Israel Street, where Tel Aviv South railway station would be built shortly thereafter, along Petah Tikva Road (now Begin Road) towards the Yarkon River, the front line at the time. The narrow-gauge railway continued to be used until 1922–23 mainly for transporting construction materials, without locomotives. Another 600 mm gauge railway extension was built from Jaffa railway station to Port of Jaffa, which operated until 1928. This extension followed Bustrus St and Howard St (now Kaufmann St and Raziel St) towards Jaffa Clock Tower, then turned west on Ruslan St towards the seafront, and continued south along the docks.

In 1918, the Palestine Military Railways of the victorious British forces rebuilt the line to the wider 1,435 mm (4 ft 8 1/2 in) standard gauge, an operation that lasted between January 27 and June 15. The final section, between Jaffa and Lydda, was completed in September 1920, and inaugurated in a ceremony attended by Sir Herbert Samuel, the British High Commissioner, on October 5.

In April 1920 the civilian Palestine Railways took over the line and Britain compensated its original French operators with £565,000, down from the original demand of £1.5 million made by the French.

=== Israel ===
Immediately following the declaration of independence by the state of Israel, services were moved to Tel Aviv South railway station 2.5 km to the east and the station was closed. (Services were then moved once again in 1970 2 km further out towards the city's outskirts, which itself became disused when a completely new railway alignment in Tel Aviv started operating in the mid-1990s.)

In 2004, after many years of neglect, the Tel Aviv–Yafo Municipality initiated a restoration project. In 2009 the restoration was completed and the station converted to an entertainment and leisure venue named "HaTachana" ("The Station").

The Elifelet station of the Red Line of the Tel Aviv Light Rail System is located just south of the historic Jaffa train station. The Red line reuses part of the original 1891 railway alignment next to the Neve Zedek neighborhood, which also includes a rail track park.
