= Kfar Chabad railway station =

Railway station in Israel

Kfar Chabad כפר חב״ד
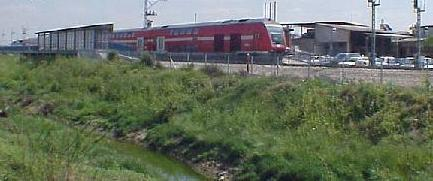

General information
- Location: Adjoining HaRakevet Quarter, Kfar Habad
- Coordinates: 31°59′35″N 34°51′11″E

Construction
- Parking: 40 spaces
- Cycle facilities: 5 spaces

History
- Opened: April 1891; 135 years ago (halt); 1952 (station)
- Closed: 1948 (halt)
- Rebuilt: 1999
- Electrified: 17 September 2022; 3 years ago
- Former names: 1891–1948: es-Safiriyya

Passengers
- 2019: 416,411
- Rank: 55 out of 68
Location

The Kfar Chabad railway station (Hebrew: כְּפַר חַבָּ״ד) is a railway station in the central Israeli village of Kfar Chabad. The station lies between Lod and Tel Aviv HaHagana. It is served by trains on the line between Binyamina and Ashkelon. The town of Kfar Chabad is a Chasidic town affiliated with the Chabad movement. The station was constructed in 1952 in place of the old Palestine Railways halt which used to serve the village of Al-Safiriyya. In 1999, as part of double-tracking the Tel-Aviv—Lod railway, Kfar Habad station had been rebuilt. The station is operated by the country's national rail operator, Israel Railways.

Preceding station	Israel Railways	Following station
Tel Aviv–HaHagana towards Binyamina	Binyamina–Beersheba	Lod–Ganei Aviv towards Be'er Sheva–Center
Tel Aviv–HaHagana towards Netanya	Netanya–Rehovot	Lod towards Rehovot
