= Tel Aviv–HaHagana railway station =

Railway station in Tel Aviv, Israel

Tel Aviv–HaHagana תל אביב – ההגנה
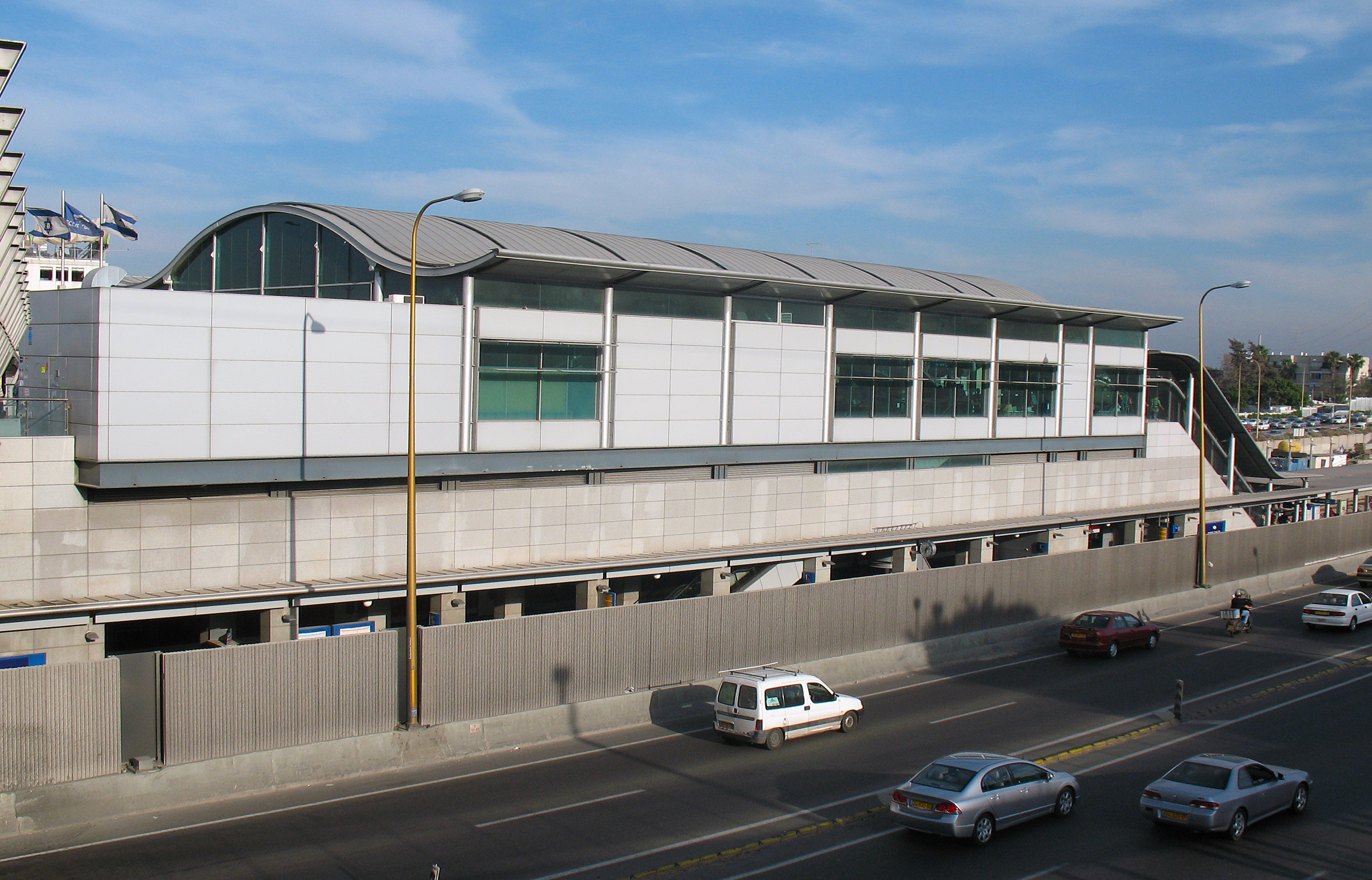

General information
- Location: 32 HaHagana Way, Tel Aviv
- Coordinates: 32°03′15″N 34°47′05″E
- Lines: Jaffa–Jerusalem railway Ayalon railway
- Platforms: 5
- Tracks: 5

Construction
- Accessible: yes

History
- Opened: 22 June 2002; 24 years ago
- Electrified: 21 December 2019; 6 years ago

Passengers
- 2019: 6,596,080
- Rank: 3 out of 68
Route map
Location

Tel Aviv–HaHagana railway station is a major railway station on the Ayalon Railway in southern Tel Aviv, Israel, serving most lines of Israel Railways. It is located in the median of the Ayalon Highway, north of Highway 1 and 400 meters (1,300 ft) east of the Tel Aviv Central Bus Station. In 2019, over six million passengers used the station, making it the third-busiest in the country after the nearby Savidor Central and HaShalom stations at the time; it was subsequently overtaken by Jerusalem–Yitzhak Navon and demoted to fourth place, but remains the third-busiest station in Tel Aviv.

The station building fronts a road bridge above the highway, connecting Lewinsky Street with HaHagana Road. The station's proximity to the central bus station makes it an important interchange.

== History ==
The station was constructed in stages. It was originally built with a single island platform and two tracks. The station building was constructed above the platform, but only half of its original design was built. Later another island platform was added to the east and the station building was expanded. Finally, another side platform was built, which serves the line to Ashdod. Those tracks cross above the older Jaffa–Jerusalem railway south of the station.

Electrification works in the station were completed in 2019. A sixth platform is expected to be added to the station in the mid-2020s as part of the project to add a fourth track to the Ayalon Railway.

== Access ==
Dan Bus Company lines 16, 46, 54, 104, 204 and 304 stop at the station's entrance and on the other side of the HaHagana road bridge. A pedestrian pass under the bridge connects the station with the latter stop. These lines mostly serve southern Tel Aviv, with lines 104 and 204 offering a frequent and fast service to Allenby Street, beach promenades and Ben Yehuda Street. A number of lines stop at HeHarash Street, stretching immediately to the west of the station, parallel to Ayalon Highway. These include Dan line 31, Egged line 26 to Bat Yam, Egged lines 71, 171 and 271 to Holon, Egged line 274 to Rehovot and a few other lines with part-time service run by Egged and Kavim. The access to the Central Bus Station is via Lewinsky Street.

== Train service ==
| Preceding station | Israel Railways | Following station |
|---|---|---|
| Tel Aviv–HaShalom towards Nahariya | Nahariya–Modi'in | Ben Gurion Airport towards Modi'in–Center |
| Tel Aviv–HaShalom towards Nahariya | Nahariya–Beersheba | Lod towards Be'er Sheva–Center |
| Tel Aviv–HaShalom towards Karmiel | Karmiel–Beersheba | Lod towards Be'er Sheva–Center |
| Tel Aviv–HaShalom towards Binyamina | Binyamina–Beersheba | Kfar Chabad towards Be'er Sheva–Center |
| Tel Aviv–HaShalom towards Netanya | Netanya–Rehovot | Kfar Chabad towards Rehovot |
| Tel Aviv–HaShalom towards Netanya | Netanya–Beit Shemesh | Lod–Ganei Aviv towards Beit Shemesh |
| Tel Aviv–HaShalom towards Herzliya | Herzliya–Ashkelon | Holon Junction towards Ashkelon |
| Tel Aviv–HaShalom towards Herzliya | Herzliya–Jerusalem | Ben Gurion Airport towards Jerusalem–Yitzhak Navon |

== Station layout ==
Platform numbers increase in a West-to-East direction

| Platform 1 | Nahariya–Modi'in and Nahariya–Beersheba trains toward Nahariya (Tel Aviv–HaShalom) → Karmiel–Beersheba trains toward Karmiel (Tel Aviv–HaShalom) → Binyamina–Beersheba trains toward Binyamina (Tel Aviv–HaShalom) → Netanya–Rehovot trains toward Netanya (Tel Aviv–HaShalom) (peak hours only) → Netanya–Beit Shemesh trains toward Netanya (Tel Aviv–HaShalom) → Herzliya–Jerusalem trains toward Herzliya (Tel Aviv–HaShalom) → Night Train toward Nahariya or Herzliya does not stop here → |
Island platform
| Platform 2 | ← Termination track – not in ordinary use → |
| Platform 3 | ← Nahariya–Modi'in trains toward Modi'in–Center (Ben Gurion Airport) ← Nahariya–Beersheba and Karmiel–Beersheba trains toward Be'er Sheva–Center (Lod) ← Binyamina–Beersheba trains toward Be'er Sheva–Center (Kfar Chabad) ← Netanya–Rehovot trains toward Rehovot (Kfar Chabad) ← Netanya–Beit Shemesh trains toward Beit Shemesh (Lod–Ganei Aviv) ← Herzliya–Jerusalem trains toward Jerusalem–Yitzhak Navon (Ben Gurion Airport) ← Night Train toward Ben Gurion Airport or Jerusalem–Yitzhak Navon does not stop here |
Island platform
| Platform 4 | Herzliya–Ashkelon trains toward Herzliya (Tel Aviv–HaShalom) → |
| Platform 5 | ← Herzliya–Ashkelon trains toward Ashkelon (Holon Junction) |
Side platform

== Ridership ==
Passengers boarding and disembarking by year
| Year | Passengers | Rank | Source |
|---|---|---|---|
| 2021 | 3,659,147 (▲1,142,574) | 3 of 66 | 2021 Freedom of Information Law Annual Report |
| 2020 | 2,516,573 (▼4,079,507) | 3 of 68 | 2020 Freedom of Information Law Annual Report |
| 2019 | 6,596,080 | 3 of 68 | 2019 Freedom of Information Law Annual Report |
