= Tel Aviv–HaShalom railway station =

Railway station in Tel Aviv, Israel

Tel Aviv–HaShalom תל אביב – השלום
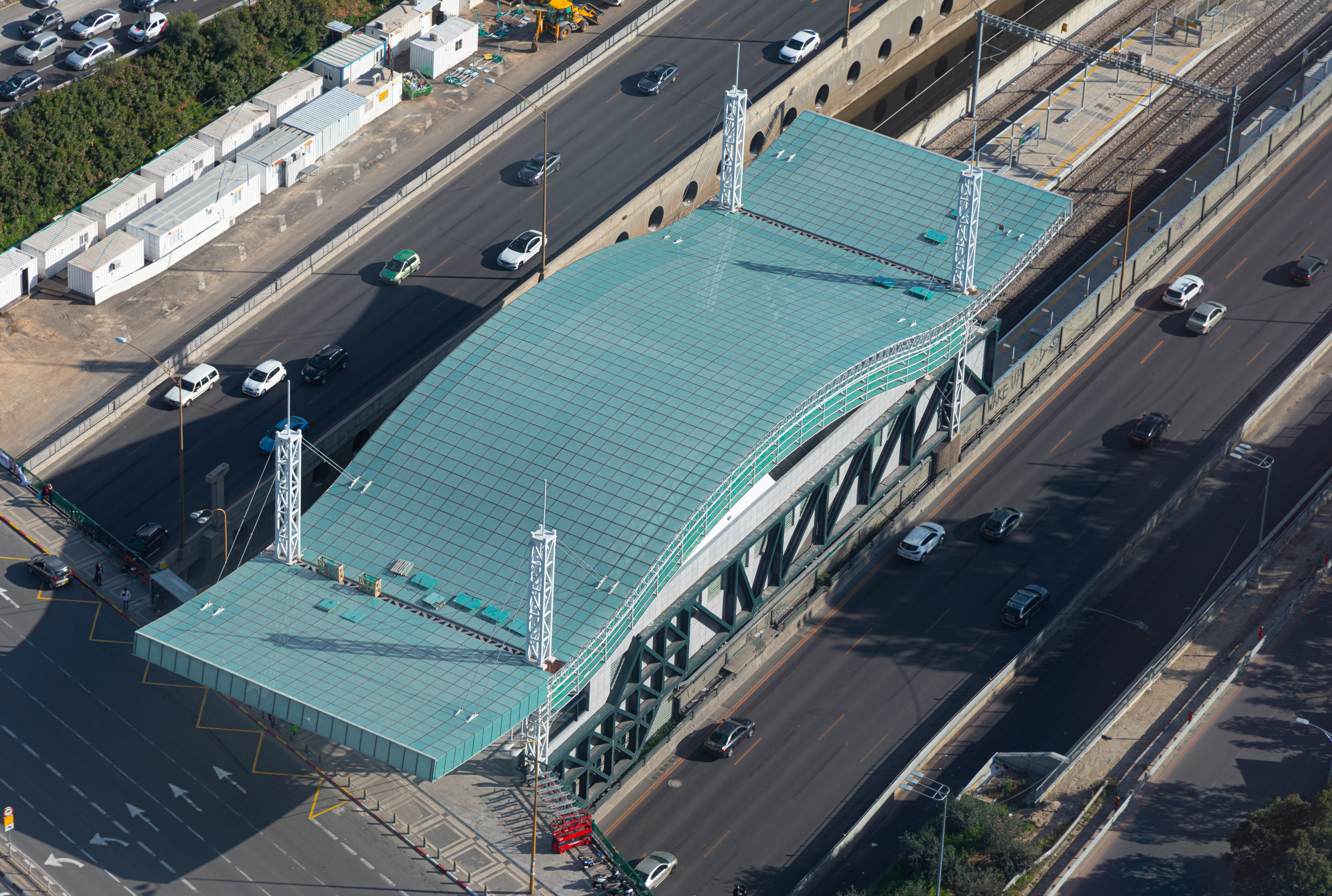
- Aerial View of the Southern Terminal

General information
- Location: 10 Givat HaTahmoshet St., Tel Aviv
- Coordinates: 32°04′24″N 34°47′35.5″E
- Line: Ayalon Railway
- Platforms: 2
- Tracks: 3

Construction
- Parking: No Parking
- Cycle facilities: 50 spaces
- Accessible: Yes

History
- Opened: 5 May 1996; 30 years ago

Passengers
- 2019: 15,352,944
- Rank: 1 out of 68
Location

Tel Aviv–HaShalom railway station (Hebrew: תַּחֲנַת תֵּל אָבִיב – הַשָּלוֹם) is a major railway station on the Ayalon Railway in central Tel Aviv, Israel, serving most lines of Israel Railways. It is located in the median of the Ayalon Highway at the HaShalom interchange, near the city's main commercial area and HaKirya IDF base. In 2019, over 15 million passengers used the station, making it the busiest in the country.

The station was built by the Polish company Mostostal Warszawa and opened in 1996 with two tracks served by two side platforms. One of the platforms was turned into an island platform when a third track was added in 2006. The station building is located above the platforms, with entrances on the north side of HaShalom Road and via a bridge connected to the Azrieli Center mall and the Shaul HaMelech light rail station.

Exit-only stairways were opened in 2008 to provide direct access to bus stops on the southern side of HaShalom Road. In February 2021 Israel Railways completed the construction of a second passenger terminal building located on the southern side of HaShalom road, opposite from the existing passenger building.

Electronic boards display the timetable in the station building, on the platforms, and in the shopping mall.

Electrification works in the station were completed in 2020. An additional side platform and fourth track are expected to be added to the station in the mid-2020s as part of the project to add a fourth track to the Ayalon Railway.

== Access ==
The station is located near several major crossroads in central Tel Aviv. HaShalom Road continues east toward Givatayim and Ramat Gan while Kaplan Street proceeds west into Tel Aviv. Dozens of bus lines pass along the parallel Begin Road on their way to and from the central bus station.

The buses serving the station area are operated primarily by Egged and Dan, as well as Kavim, Superbus, Afikim and Nateev Express.

== Gallery ==
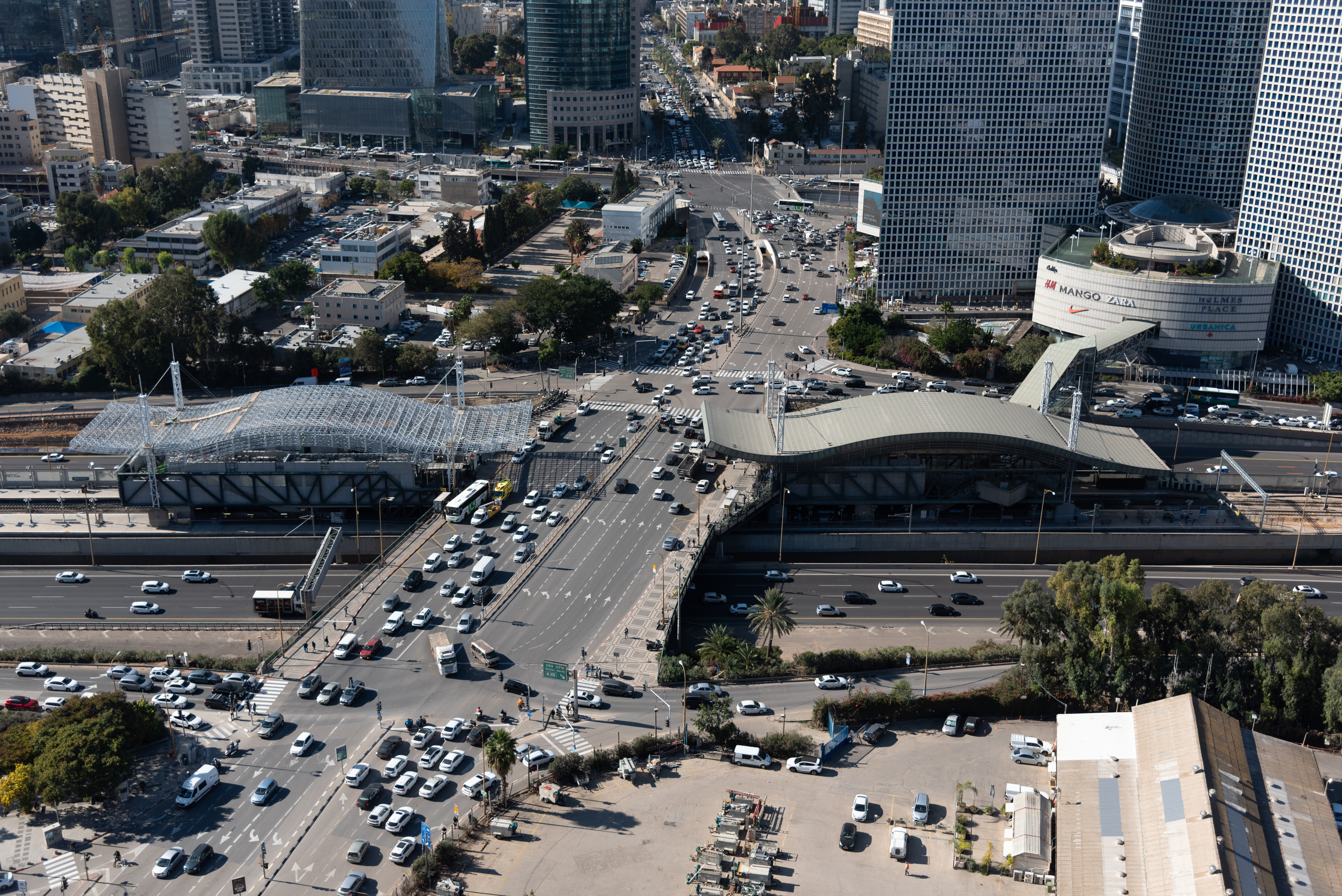
The new southern entrance under construction

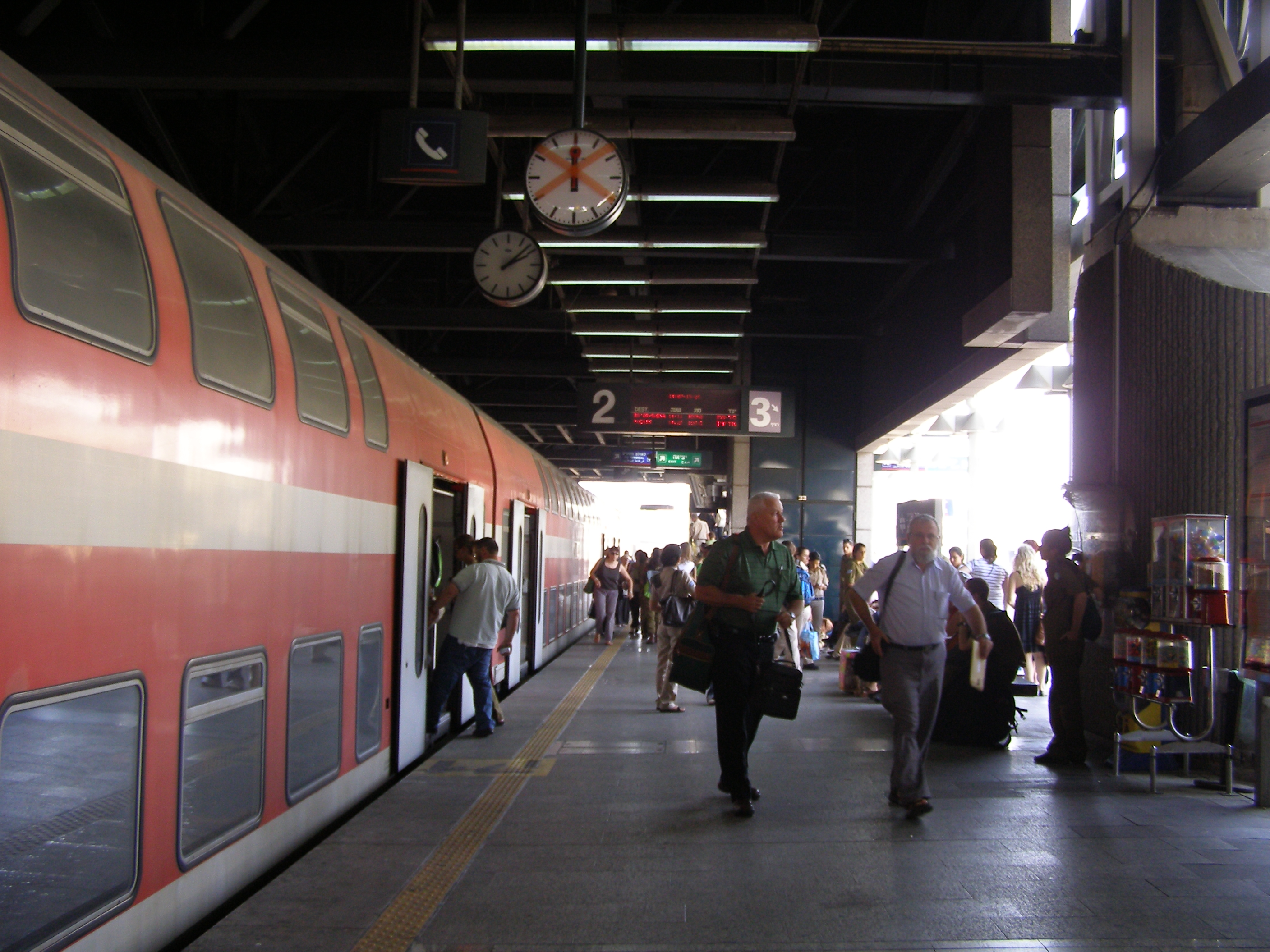
The station platform

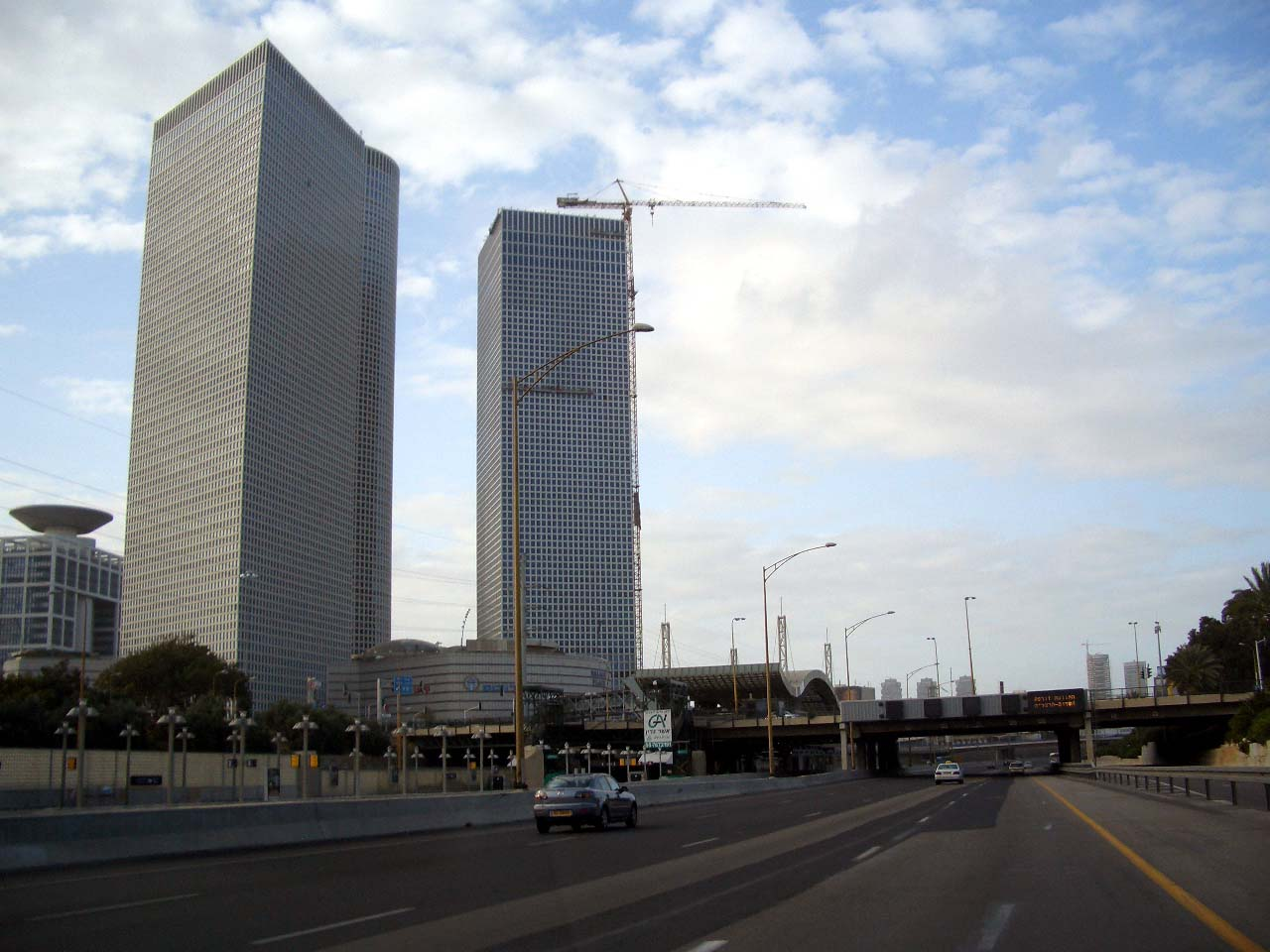
View from the Ayalon Highway in 2007

== Train service ==
Preceding station	Israel Railways	Following station
Tel Aviv–Savidor Center towards Nahariya	Nahariya–Modi'in	Tel Aviv–HaHagana towards Modi'in–Center
Tel Aviv–Savidor Center towards Nahariya	Nahariya–Beersheba	Tel Aviv–HaHagana towards Be'er Sheva–Center
Tel Aviv–Savidor Center towards Karmiel	Karmiel–Beersheba	Tel Aviv–HaHagana towards Be'er Sheva–Center
Tel Aviv–Savidor Center towards Binyamina	Binyamina–Beersheba	Tel Aviv–HaHagana towards Be'er Sheva–Center
Tel Aviv–Savidor Center towards Netanya	Netanya–Beit Shemesh	Tel Aviv–HaHagana towards Beit Shemesh
Tel Aviv–Savidor Center towards Netanya	Netanya–Rehovot	Tel Aviv–HaHagana towards Rehovot
Tel Aviv–Savidor Center towards Herzliya	Herzliya–Ashkelon	Tel Aviv–HaHagana towards Ashkelon
Tel Aviv–Savidor Center towards Herzliya	Herzliya–Jerusalem	Tel Aviv–HaHagana towards Jerusalem–Yitzhak Navon

== Station layout ==
Platform numbers increase in a West-to-East direction

Side platform
Platform 1	Nahariya–Modi'in and Nahariya–Beersheba trains toward Nahariya (Tel Aviv–Savidor Center) → Nahariya–Beersheba trains toward Tel Aviv–Savidor Center (terminus) (selected off-peak trains) → Karmiel–Beersheba trains toward Karmiel (Tel Aviv–Savidor Center) → Binyamina–Beersheba trains toward Binyamina (Tel Aviv–Savidor Center) → Netanya–Rehovot trains toward Netanya (Tel Aviv–Savidor Center) (peak hours only) → Netanya–Beit Shemesh trains toward Netanya (Tel Aviv–Savidor Center) (during peak hours) → Netanya–Beit Shemesh trains toward Tel Aviv–Savidor Center (terminus) (off-peak hours) → Herzliya–Jerusalem trains toward Herzliya (Tel Aviv–Savidor Center) → Night Train toward Herzliya or Nahariya does not stop here →
Platform 2	← Nahariya–Modi'in trains toward Modi'in–Center (Tel Aviv–HaHagana) ← Nahariya–Beersheba, Karmiel–Beersheba and Binyamina–Beersheba trains toward Be'er Sheva–Center (Tel Aviv–HaHagana) ← Netanya–Rehovot trains toward Rehovot (Tel Aviv–HaHagana) (peak hours only) ← Netanya–Beit Shemesh trains toward Beit Shemesh (Tel Aviv–HaHagana) ← Herzliya–Jerusalem trains toward Jerusalem–Yitzhak Navon (Tel Aviv–HaHagana) ← Night Train toward Ben Gurion Airport or Jerusalem–Yitzhak Navon does not stop here
Island platform
Platform 3	Herzliya–Ashkelon trains toward Herzliya (Tel Aviv–Savidor Center) → ← Herzliya–Ashkelon trains toward Ashkelon (Tel Aviv–HaHagana)

== Ridership ==
Passengers boarding and disembarking by year
Year	Passengers	Rank	Source
2021	8,425,111 (▲2,790,019)	1 of 66	2021 Freedom of Information Law Annual Report
2020	5,635,092 (▼9,717,852)	1 of 68	2020 Freedom of Information Law Annual Report
2019	15,352,944	1 of 68	2019 Freedom of Information Law Annual Report
