= Grand Canyon (disambiguation) =

The Grand Canyon is a steep-sided canyon in Arizona, United States.

Grand Canyon may also refer to:

== Places ==
=== Canada ===
- Grand Canyon of the Fraser, British Columbia
- Grand Canyon of the Nechako, British Columbia
- Grand Canyon of the Stikine, British Columbia

=== China ===
- Yarlung Tsangpo Grand Canyon

=== Denmark ===
- Grand Canyon (Greenland)

=== Ukraine ===
- Grand Canyon (Crimea)

=== United States ===
- Grand Canyon National Park, surrounding the canyon
- Grand Canyon Village, Arizona, a community within the national park
- Grand Canyon University, in Phoenix, Arizona
- Grand Canyon West, a tourism development in Arizona
- Grand Canyon of the Tuolumne, California
- Grand Canyon of the Pacific, Hawaii
- Grand Canyon (Missouri)
- Grand Canyon of Pennsylvania, or Pine Creek Gorge
- Grand Canyon of the Elwha, Washington
- Grand Canyon of the Yellowstone, Wyoming

=== Mars ===
- Valles Marineris

== Film ==
- Grand Canyon (1949 film), an American Western
- Grand Canyon (1958 film), a Disney documentary film
- Grand Canyon (1991 film), an American drama film
- Grand Canyon: The Hidden Secrets, a 1984 IMAX documentary

== Literature ==
- Grand Canyon (book), a 2017 children's picture book by Jason Chin
- Grand Canyon: A Different View, 2003 book edited by Tom Vail

== Music ==
- Grand Canyon Suite, a 1931 suite for orchestra by Ferde Grofé
- "Grand Canyon", a song by Puscifer from the 2015 album Money Shot
- "Grand Canyon", a song by The Magnetic Fields from their 1999 album 69 Love Songs

== Visual arts ==
- Grand Canyon of the Colorado River (Moran), a 1892-1908 painting by Thomas Moran
- The Grand Canyon of the Yellowstone (1872), by Thomas Moran
- The Grand Canyon of the Yellowstone (1901), by Thomas Moran

== Other uses ==
- Grand Canyon Airlines, an American airline
- Grand Canyon Beersheba, a shopping mall in Beersheba, Israel
- Grand Canyon Education, in Phoenix, Arizona
- Grand Canyon Haifa, a shopping mall in Haifa, Israel
- Grand Canyon Limited, an American train
- Grand Canyon Railway, in Arizona

== See also ==
- Grand Canyon Airport (disambiguation)
- SS Grand Canyon State (T-ACS-3), a U.S. Navy reserve ship
- Verdon Gorge, in the Provence-Alpes-Côte d'Azur region, France
