= Liard (disambiguation) =

Liard River is a river in the Yukon Territory, British Columbia and the Northwest Territories, Canada. The Liard River is an officially named Grand Canyon.

Liard may also refer to:

- Liard River First Nation, a First Nation in the southeastern Yukon Territory in Canada.

== People ==
- José Liard (born 1945), Uruguayan illustrator and musician
- Matthew Liard (1736–1782), English engraver

== Places ==
- Fort Liard, Northwest Territories, a Dehcho village located in the southwest corner of the Northwest Territories, Canada.
  - Fort Liard Airport
- Upper Liard, Yukon, a chiefly First Nation settlement immediately west of Watson Lake in Canada's Yukon Territory
- Liard River, British Columbia, a small community in the northwest of the province of British Columbia, in Canada
- British Columbia Highway 77, also called Liard Highway
  - Liard River Hot Springs Provincial Park
  - Liard River Corridor Provincial Park and Protected Area
- The Liard Plains
- Liard Formation, a stratigraphical unit of the Western Canadian Sedimentary Basin
- Fort Nelson - Liard Regional District, an earlier name of the Northern Rockies Regional District, British Columbia

== Biology ==
- Liard (animal), a Panthera hybrid (male lion and female leopard)
- Liard (tree), a variant name for the Eastern Cottonwood poplar Populus deltoides

== Numismatics ==
- Liard (coin), a coin, a subdivision of the Austrian Netherlands kronenthaler

== Economy ==
- Liard Air Ltd., an airport operator (Fort Nelson (Parker Lake) Water Aerodrome).

== See also ==
- Égliseneuve-des-Liards, a commune in the Arrondissement of Issoire, France
- Bridgeton, Missouri, earlier name : Marais des Liards (Cottonwood Swamp)
