= HaMifratz Central railway station =

Transport hub in Haifa, Israel

HaMifratz Central מרכזית המפרץ
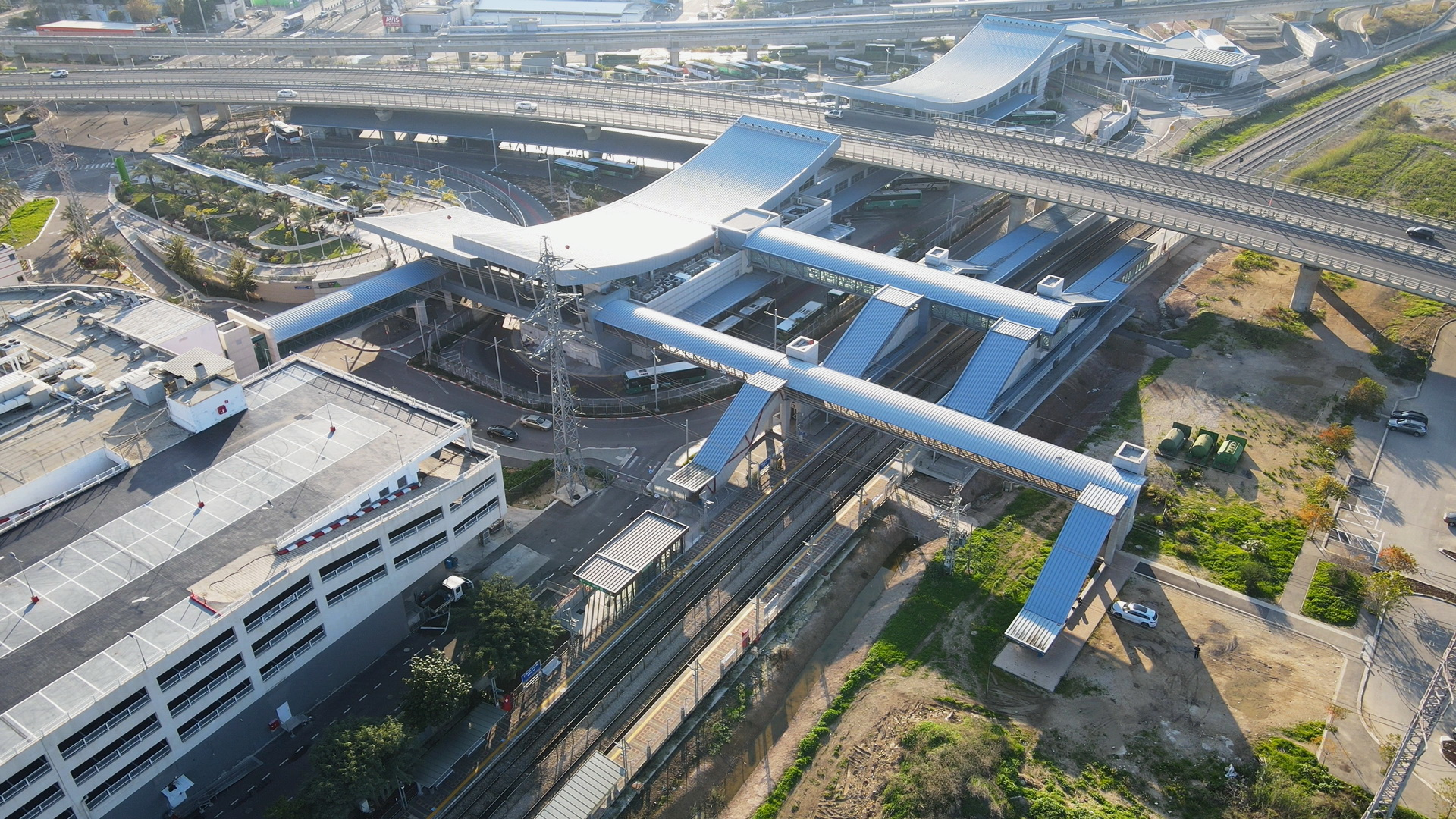
- HaMifratz Central station in 2020

General information
- Location: 55 HaHistadrut Blvd., Haifa; Israel
- Platforms: 3
- Tracks: 3
- Connections: Intercity buses City buses Metronit BRT; Rakavlit; Haifa–Nazareth Light Rail (future)

Construction
- Structure type: At-grade, Elevated
- Parking: 500 free spaces
- Accessible: Yes

History
- Opened: 8 October 2001; 25 years ago
- Former names: 2001–2018: Haifa–Lev HaMifratz

Passengers
- 2019: 2,984,821
- Rank: 15 out of 68
Location

HaMifratz Central station (Hebrew: מרכזית המפרץ, Merkazit HaMifratz, lit. [Haifa] Bay Central; Arabic: همفراتس المركزية, Hamifrāts al-Mirkazīyah) is a major public transport hub in Haifa, Israel, located near the southern end of Haifa Bay. It contains an Israel Railways station and Haifa's largest bus terminal, as well as the Rakavlit cable car and the under-construction Nofit light rail to Nazareth. The station functions as a major transfer hub for Haifa and Northern Israel. It is one of two railway stations serving Haifa Bay's industrial area, with the other one being the much smaller Hutzot HaMifratz station.

== Overview ==
HaMifratz Central is built around its railway station, which is situated where the Jezreel Valley railway splits off from the main coastal railway. Due to this, the railway station is split into two sections, with the central bus station lying in between these two sections. Both sections of the railway station are connected to each other by elevated walkways that pass over the bus station and allows for in-station transfers between trains. Another elevated walkway also connects the bus station to the adjacent Lev HaMifratz Mall, one of Haifa's largest malls.

The interior of the bus station acts as a terminal for intercity buses, while stops lining the building's exterior are used for local bus lines within Haifa and its suburbs, including the Metronit BRT and a direct shuttle to nearby Haifa Airport. The station is also served by share taxis passing through Highway 4, which runs just south of the station.

The station is also home to the Rakavlit cable car, which connects the station with the Technion and the University of Haifa. As such, the Rakavlit has become the main way of reaching the two universities by public transit, saving the need to take winding bus routes up Mount Carmel.

The station is also slated to be the terminus of the Haifa–Nazareth Light Rail, which is scheduled to open in 2029.

== Construction ==
The railway station was constructed during the summer of 2001 and officially opened on 8 October 2001 as Haifa–Lev HaMifratz Station (Hebrew: לב המפרץ, lit. Heart of [Haifa] Bay). It was the first public railway station whose construction was entirely funded by a private enterprise, the adjacent Lev HaMifratz Mall.

At the time, the station only consisted of the coastal railway section, since the New Jezreel Valley railway had not yet been built. As such, the station was located directly beside the Lev HaMifratz shopping mall—to the east of its modern location.

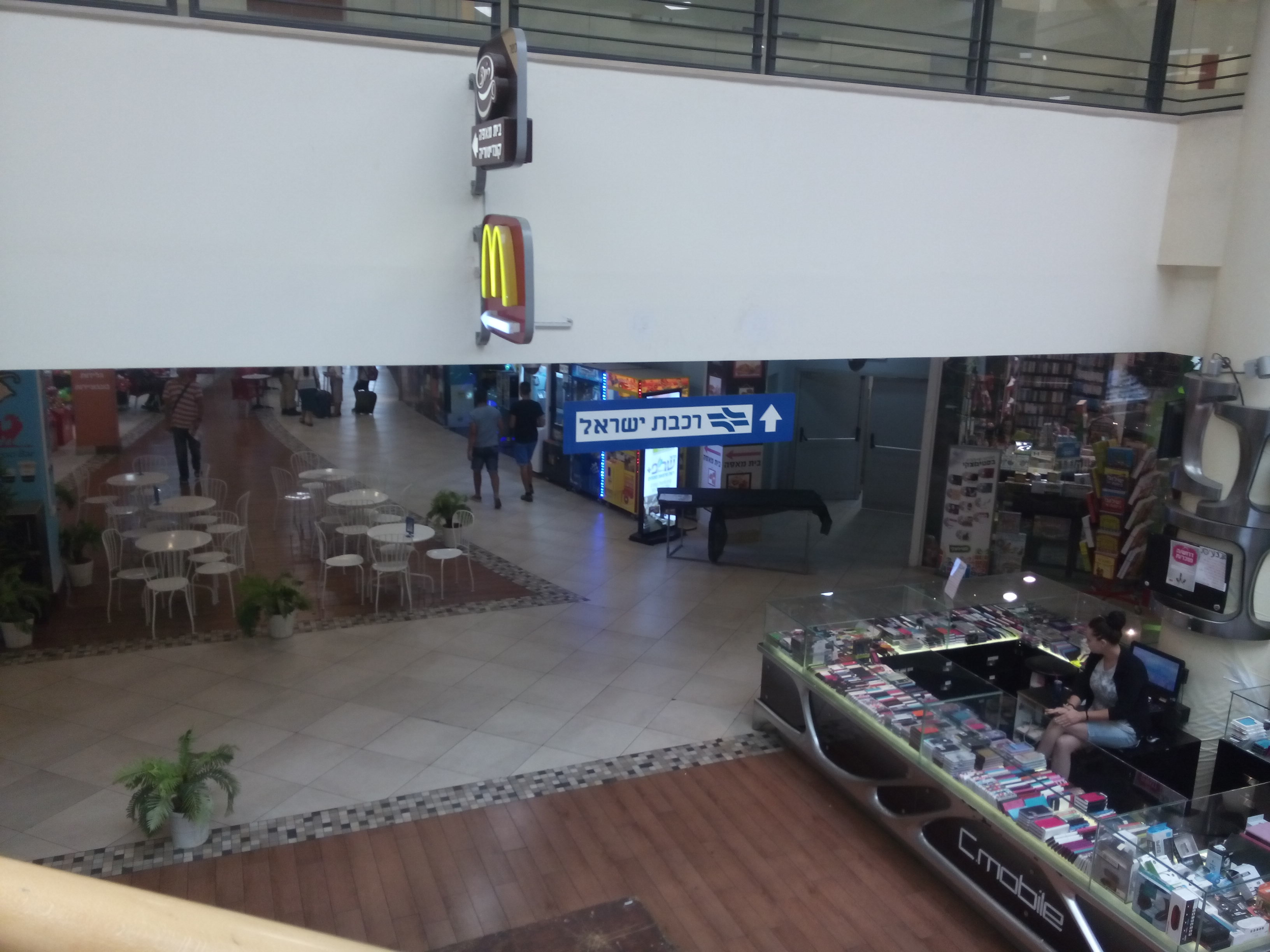
HaMifratz Central railway station entrance in Lev HaMifratz Mall, which was previously the only way to get into the railway station

The bus station opened in 2002, one year after the railway station. When first completed, the bus station only consisted of roofs and outdoor bus platforms, with no direct connection to the railway station; the only way in and out of the railway station was through the Lev HaMifratz shopping mall.

During the 2006 Lebanon War on 16 July, train service to the station was suspended after a Hezbollah Katyusha rocket hit a train depot in Haifa, killing eight Israel Railways workers. Service was restored 29 days later on 14 August, just as a ceasefire went into effect.

In 2014, an overpass for Highway 75 was built directly over the bus station, connecting the highway with Highway 22 towards downtown Haifa.

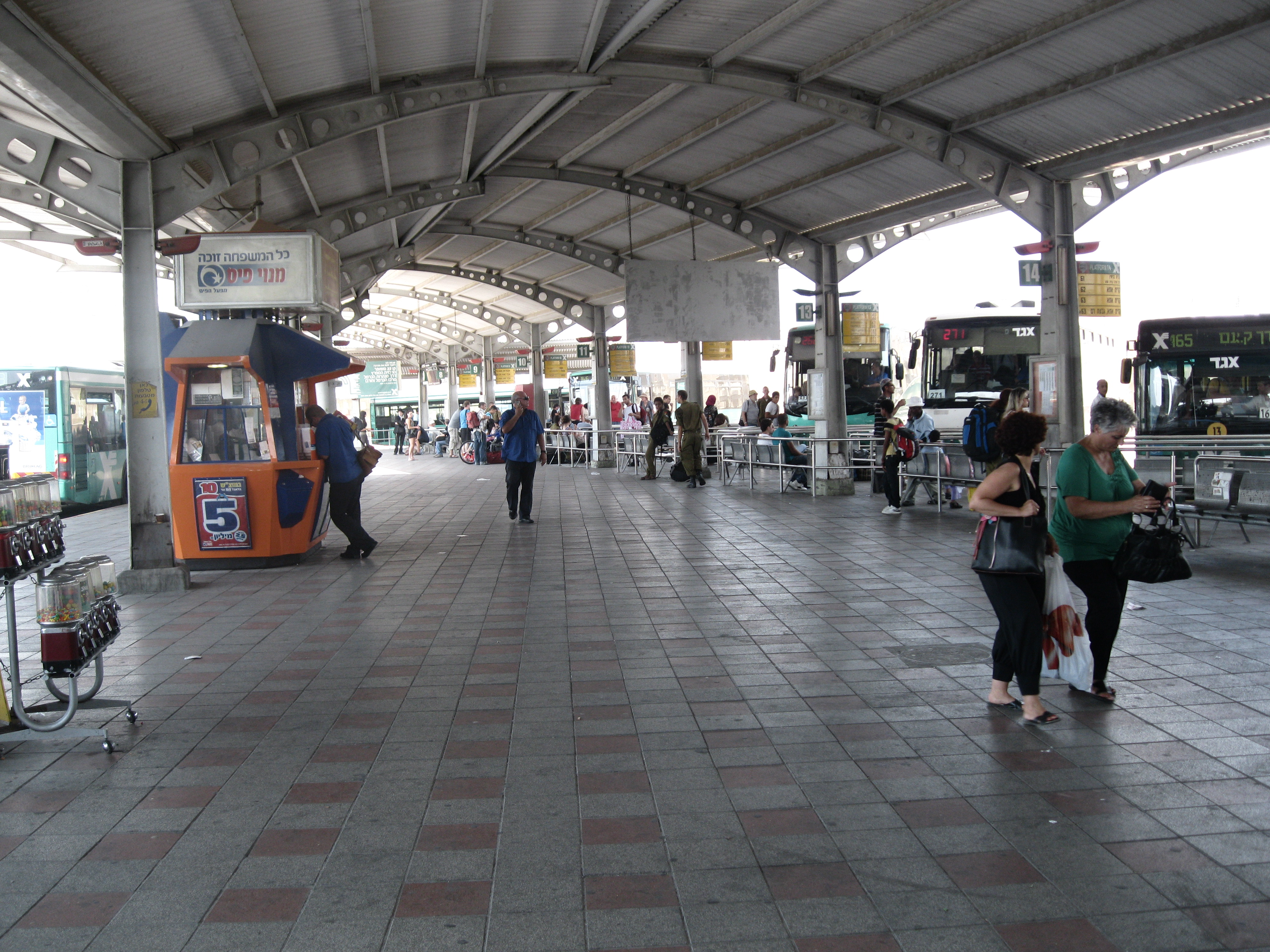
HaMifratz Central bus station prior to its renovation

Starting in the summer of 2015, work began on renovating the bus station to its modern form.

In October 2016, the New Jezreel Valley railway opened, with one of its stations being HaMifratz Central. However, initially there was only a connection to the bus station, and there was no way to directly transfer from the valley line to the coastal lines. In 2018, an elevated walkway connecting between the bus station and the mall was completed. This allowed a transfer to the coastal lines, but only by exiting the station and going through the mall.

Also in 2018, the Station was officially renamed to its current name, Merkazit HaMifratz (HaMifratz Central).

Renovations for the station were completed in late 2019. The new platforms for the coastal railway allowed a direct transfer to the rest of HaMifratz Central without going through the mall, essentially merging all three stations into one transit hub.

In 2022, the Rakavlit cable car opened, with its terminus being located at HaMifratz Central near the Jezreel Valley railway.

Future plans for this station include platforms for the Haifa–Nazareth Light Rail, building an additional platform for the Jezreel Valley railway, and additional platforms for the Coastal railway.

== Train service ==
HaMifratz Central is a station on the main north–south coastal line of Israel Railways Nahariya–Haifa–Tel-Aviv–Modi'in/Be'er Sheva Inter-City Service), the suburban line serving Haifa's northern suburbs – The Krayot (Haifa–Kiryat Motzkin Suburban Service) and the Jezreel Valley railway. The coastal railway platforms are located to the north of the central bus station building, while the platform serving the Jezreel Valley railway is located to the west of the building. Access between the two rail lines is available through the building. The station is situated between Hutzot HaMifratz railway station to the north and Haifa Center–HaShmona railway station to the south.

Preceding station	Israel Railways	Following station
Hutzot HaMifratz towards Nahariya	Nahariya–Modi'in	Haifa Center–HaShmona towards Modi'in–Center
Kiryat Motzkin towards Nahariya	Nahariya–Beersheba	Haifa Center–HaShmona towards Be'er Sheva–Center
Kiryat Motzkin towards Karmiel	Karmiel–Beersheba	Haifa Center–HaShmona towards Be'er Sheva–Center
Hutzot HaMifratz towards Karmiel	Karmiel–Haifa	Haifa Center–HaShmona towards Haifa–Hof HaCarmel
Yokneam–Kfar Yehoshua towards Beit She'an	Beit She'an–Atlit	Haifa Center–HaShmona towards Atlit

=== Platform layout ===
The coastal lines run through two at-grade platforms in the station's northeast, with platform 1 running southbound trains and platform 2 running northbound trains.
The Jezreel Valley line runs on platform 3 in the station's west. This elevated platform currently serves trains in both directions.

Coastal Line	Side platform
Coastal Line	Platform 2	Nahariya–Modi'in toward Nahariya (Hutzot HaMifratz) → Nahariya–Beersheba trains toward Nahariya (Kiryat Motzkin) → Karmiel–Beersheba trains toward Karmiel (Kiryat Motzkin) → Karmiel–Haifa trains toward Karmiel (Hutzot HaMifratz) →
Coastal Line	Platform 1	← Nahariya–Modi'in trains toward Modi'in–Center (Haifa Center–HaShmona) ← Nahariya–Beersheba toward Be'er Sheva–Center (Haifa Center–HaShmona) ← Karmiel–Beersheba toward Be'er Sheva–Center (Haifa Center–HaShmona) ← Karmiel–Haifa trains toward Haifa–Hof HaCarmel (Haifa Center–HaShmona)
Coastal Line	Side platform
Jezreel Valley Line	Platform 3	Beit She'an–Atlit toward Beit She'an–David Levy (Yokneam–Kfar Yehoshua) → ← Beit She'an–Atlit toward Atlit (Haifa Center–HaShmona)
Jezreel Valley Line	Side platform

=== Train ridership ===
Passengers boarding and disembarking by year
Year	Passengers	Rank	Source
2021	1,642,487 (▲529,425)	12 of 66 (▲1)	2021 Freedom of Information Law Annual Report
2020	1,113,062 (▼1,871,759)	13 of 68 (▲3)	2020 Freedom of Information Law Annual Report
2019	2,984,821	15 of 68	2019 Freedom of Information Law Annual Report

== Bus service ==
The bus routes originating or passing at HaMifratz Central bus station as of January 2022 are listed below:

=== Metronit ===
Line	Route	Operator	Notes
1	Krayot CBS–Carmel Beach CBS	Superbus	Wheelchair accessible line
2	Kiryat Ata–Bat Galim CBS	Superbus	Wheelchair accessible line
3	Krayot CBS–Hadar HaCarmel	Superbus	Wheelchair accessible line
4	Krayot CBS–Carmel Beach CBS	Superbus	Wheelchair accessible line

=== Local routes ===
Line	Route	Operator	Notes
7	HaMifratz CBS–Nesher	Egged	Wheelchair accessible line
16	HaMifratz CBS–Bat Galim via Neve Sha'anan	Egged	Wheelchair accessible line
40	HaMifratz CBS – Bat Galim via Neve Paz	Egged	Wheelchair accessible line
70, 71, 78, 79	HaMifratz CBS–Nesher	Egged	Wheelchair accessible line
115, 132, 133, 146	HaMifratz CBS–Carmel Beach CBS	Egged	Wheelchair accessible line
100	HaMifrats CBS – Uri Michaeli Haifa International Airport	Egged	Wheelchair accessible line
101	HaMifrats CBS – Carmel Beach CBS, express via Grand Kanyon and Carmel Tunnels	Egged	Wheelchair accessible line
123	Kiryat Ata Junction–Carmel Beach CBS or HaMifrats CBS – Carmel Beach CBS	Egged	Wheelchair accessible line
125	Grand Canyon–HaMifratz CBS	Egged	Wheelchair accessible line, one way
131	HaMifratz CBS–Carmel Hospital	Egged	Wheelchair accessible line, one way
136	Kiryat Ata Junction–Bat Galim via Carmel Tunnels	Egged	Wheelchair accessible line
141	HaMifratz CBS–Haifa University	Egged	Wheelchair accessible line
142	HaMifratz CBS–Technion	Egged	Wheelchair accessible line
225	HaMIfrats CBS – Carmel Beach CBS, express via Kiryat Shprinzak (few times a day)	Egged	Wheelchair accessible line

=== Intercity routes ===
Line	Route	Operator	Notes
72, 72א	HaMifratz CBS–Kfar Hasidim via Nesher	Egged	
73	HaMifratz CBS–Ibtin via Nesher, Kfar Hasidim	Egged	
74	HaMifratz CBS–Ras Ali via Nesher, Ibtin	Egged	
75	HaMifratz CBS–Ramat Tiv'on	Superbus	
165, 167	HaMifratz CBS–Shfar'am	Nateev Express	
166	HaMifratz CBS–I'billin	Nateev Express	
168, 170	HaMifratz CBS–Tamra	Nateev Express	
169	HaMifratz CBS–Deir Hanna	Nateev Express	
180, 181	HaMifratz CBS–Yokneam Illit	Superbus	
188	HaMifratz CBS–Yokne'am Illit	Superbus	
248	HaMifratz CBS–Umm al-Fahm	Superbus	
251	HaMifratz CBS–Akko CBS	Nateev Express	
255	HaMifratz CBS–Kabul	Nateev Express	
261, 262, 264	HaMifratz CBS–Carmiel	Egged	
265	HaMifratz CBS–Carmiel	Nateev Express	
271, 272, 371	HaMifratz CBS–Nahariya Bus & railway station	Nateev Express	
282	HaMifratz CBS–Abu Snan	Nateev Express	
284	HaMifratz CBS–Yarka	Nateev Express	
300, 301, 302	HaMifratz CBS–Afula CBS	Superbus	302 goes via Yoknea'm, 300 is express
306	HaMifratz CBS–Kfar Manda	Nateev Express	
331, 344	HaMifratz CBS–Nazareth	G.B. Tours	331 also starts near Lin Medical Center
332	HaMifratz CBS–Nazareth Illit via Nesher & Migdal HaEmek	Nazareth Tours & Tourism	also starts at the Haifa Center Railway Station
342	HaMifratz CBS–Nazareth Illit via Krayot	Nazareth Tours & Tourism	
352	HaMifratz CBS–Nazareth Illit	Nazareth Tours & Tourism	
358	HaMifratz CBS–Migdal HaEmek	G.B. Tours	
361	HaMifratz CBS–Safed CBS	Nateev Express	
380	HaMifratz CBS–Kalanit. via Maghar	Nazareth Tours & Tourism	
430, 434	HaMifratz CBS–Tiberias CBS	Egged	
432	HaMifratz CBS–Gesher	Superbus	
435	HaMifratz CBS–Golani Junction	Egged	
500, 505	HaMifratz CBS–Kiryat Shmona CBS	Egged	
503	HaMifratz CBS–Katzrin	Egged	
509	HaMifratz CBS–Hatzor HaGlilit Bus Terminal	Egged	
893	HaMifratz CBS–Eilat CBS	Egged	Seasonal line
909	HaMifratz CBS–Tel Aviv New CBS	Egged	
960	HaMifratz CBS–Jerusalem CBS	Egged	
993	HaMifratz CBS–Eilat CBS	Egged	

== Gallery ==
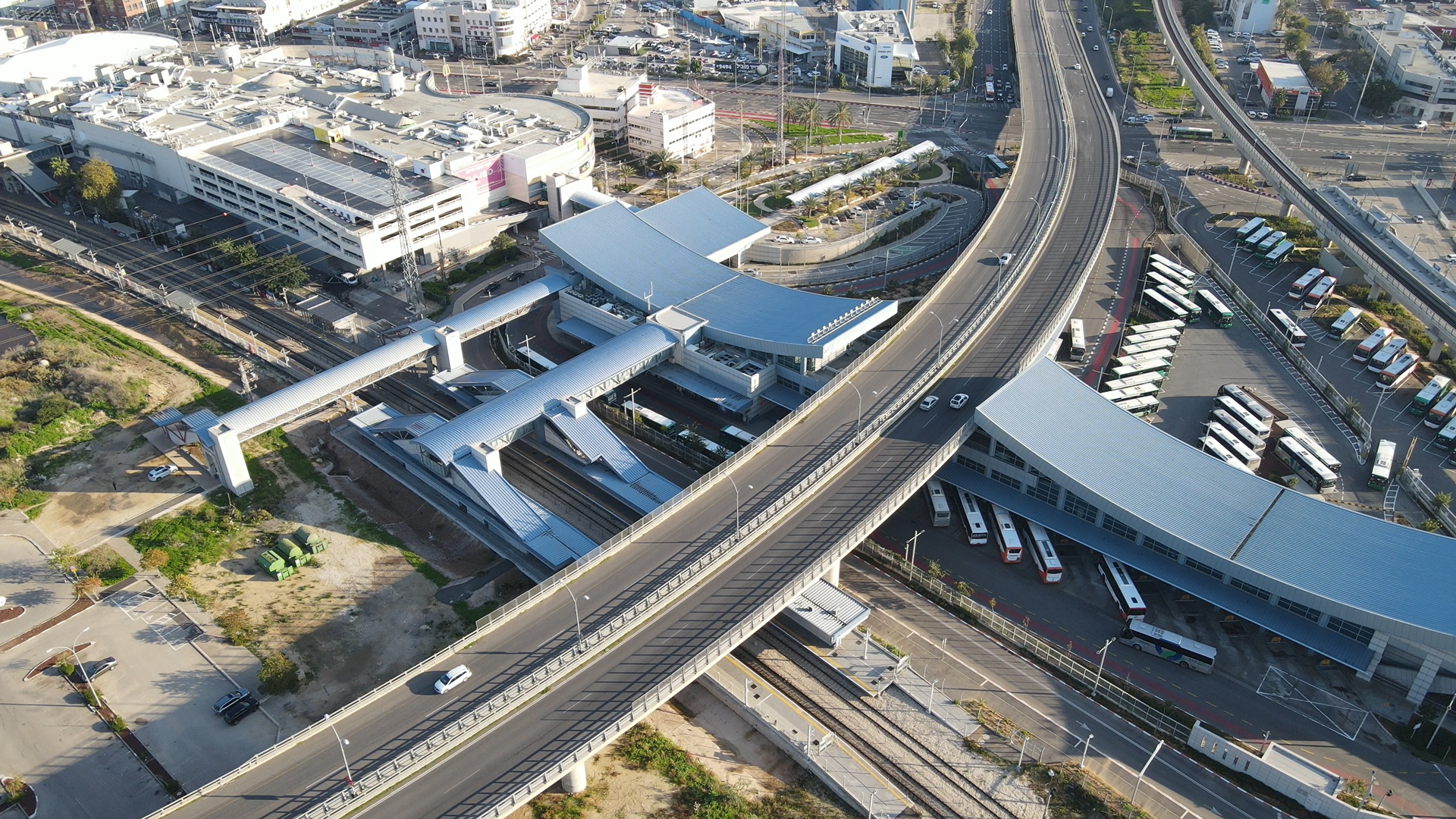
Aerial photo of HaMifratz Central bus station

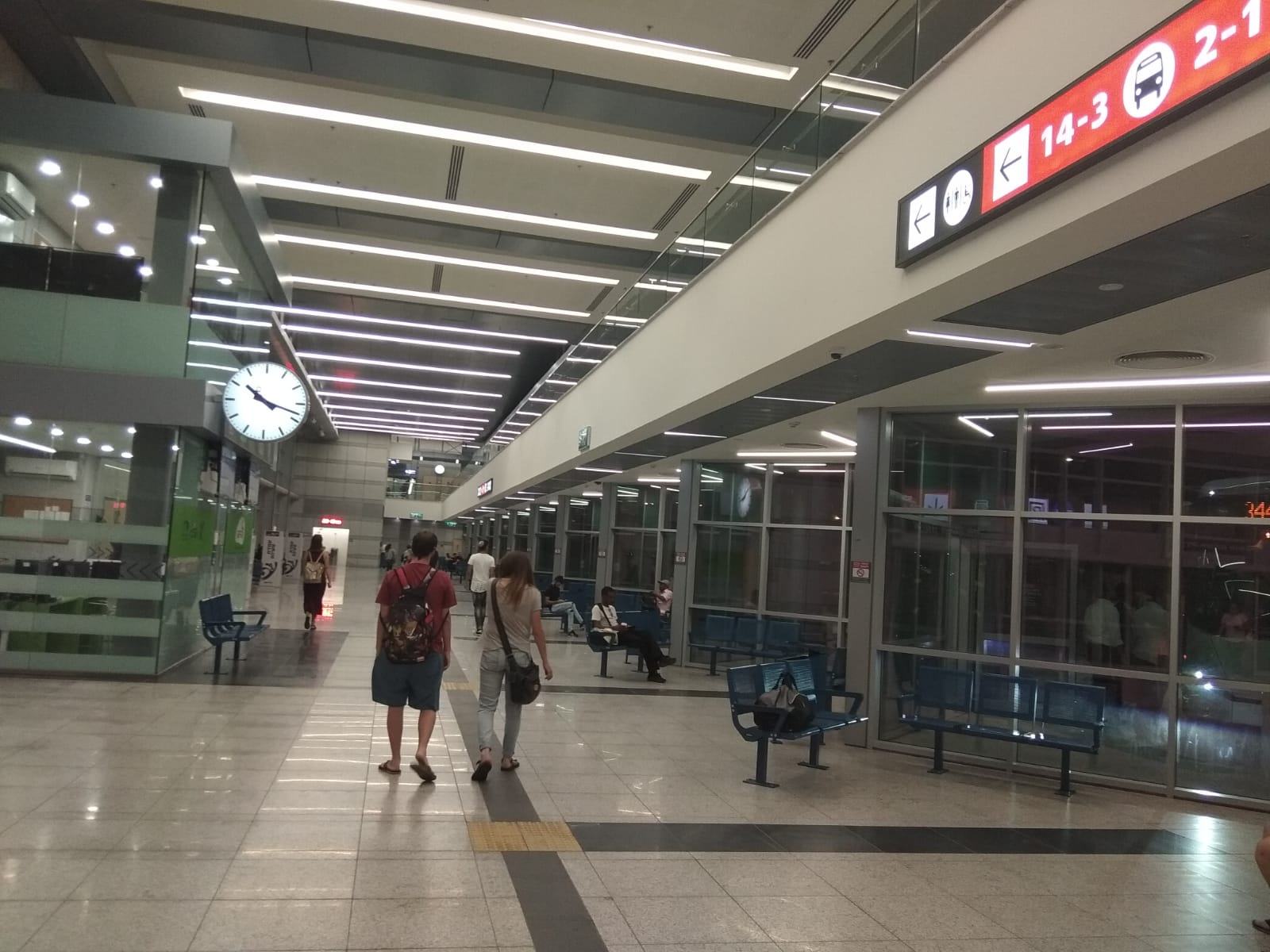
The interior of HaMifratz Central bus station after its 2015-2019 renovation

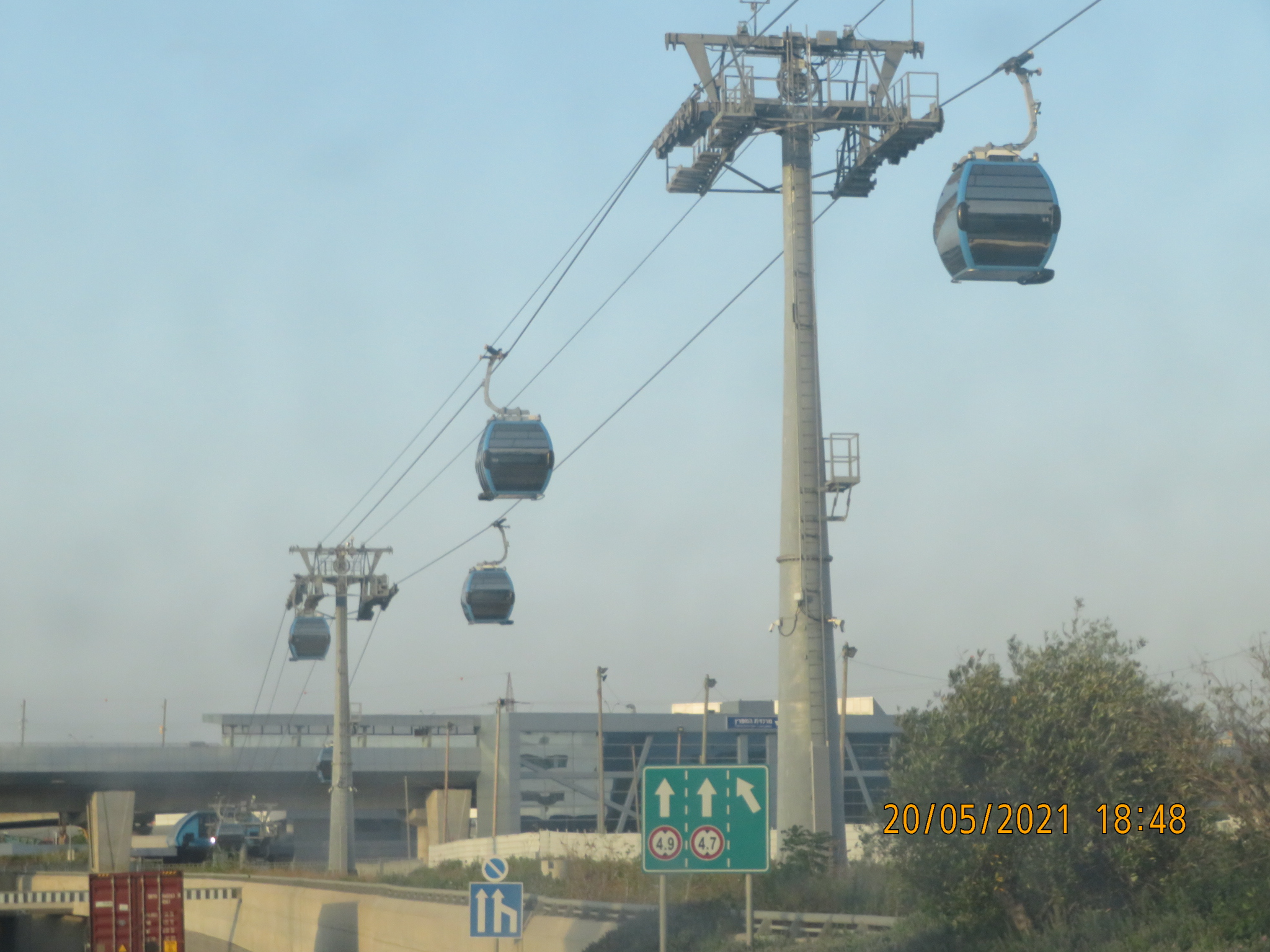
Rakavlit cable cars heading away from HaMfiratz Central Station
