= List of shopping malls in Israel =

The following is a list of shopping malls in Israel.

In Israel, use of the word kanyon is a play on the words "kne (male) / kni (female) and “liknot”, which means “buy", and "henyon ", which means "parking space" (due to the large amount of parking spaces near the mall), while at the same time sounding like the English word canyon. With the establishment of this mall, the word kanyon entered the Hebrew language. The word is now used to describe any covered shopping centre and many malls in Israel since then have been named with "kanyon" in their title.

== Tel Aviv District ==
=== Tel Aviv ===
- Azrieli Center
- Dizengoff Center
- Gan Ha'ir
- London Ministores Mall (used for small businesses)
- Mikado Center
- Ramat Aviv Mall
- TLV Fashion Mall
- Weizmann Center|Weizmann City

=== Giv'atayim ===
- Friendly Borochov
- Giv'atayim Mall

=== Herzliya ===
- Arena Mall
- Outlet Herzliya
- Seven Stars Mall (Shivat Hakokhavim)

=== Ramat Gan ===
- Ayalon Mall
- Bialik Mall
- Dan Design Center
- Marom Mall

=== Ramat HaSharon ===
- BIG Fashion Glilot
- Cinema City Glilot

=== Holon ===
- Holon Mall
- Mega Or Wolfson

=== Bat Yam ===
- Bat Yam Mall
- Bat Yamon

=== Or Yehuda ===
- Or Yehuda Outlet

=== Kiryat Ono ===
- Kiryat Ono Mall

== Central District ==
=== Rishon LeZion ===
- Azrieli Rishonim
- BIG Rishon LeZion
- G City (Cinema City)
- G Rothschild Center
- Kanyon Hazahav (Golden Mall)
- Lev Rishon

=== Netanya ===
- Alexandra Yachin Poleg Mall
- BIG Poleg
- Hadarim Mall
- HaSharon Mall
- Ir Yamim Mall
- Irusim Mall

=== Yehud ===
- Savyonim Mall

=== Petah Tikva ===
- Barukh Center
- Em Hamoshavot Mall
- Lev HaIr Mall
- Ovnat Mall (The Big Mall)
- Sirkin Mall

=== Rehovot ===
- American City
- Rehovot Mall

=== Ra'anana ===
- Azrieli Ra'anana (Park Mall)
- Renanim Mall

=== Kfar Saba ===
- Arim Mall
- G Kfar Saba
- Green Kfar Saba Mall (Kfar Saba HaYeruka)

=== Hod HaSharon ===
- Azrieli Hod HaSharon Mall (Margalit HaSharon Mall)
- Sharonim Mall

=== Giv'at Shmuel ===
- HaGiva Mall
- Rogovin Center Giv'at Shmuel

=== Ramla ===
- Kanion Ramlod (Ramlot Center)
- Kiryat Ramla Mall
- Ramla Mall

=== Lod ===
- Lod Center Mall

=== Modi'in-Maccabim-Re'ut ===
- Ispro Center Modiin
- Mega Or Modiin
- Modiin Mall

=== Yavne ===
- G Yavne Mall
- Rogovin Center Yavne

== Haifa District ==
=== Haifa ===
- Castra Mall
- Grand Canyon Haifa
- Haifa Hof HaCarmel Central Bus Station
- Haifa Mall
- Horev Center
- Hutzot HaMifratz mall
- Lev HaMifratz Mall
- Panorama Center

==== Krayot ====
- Azrieli Kiryat Ata
- BIG Kiryat Ata
- Kiryon Mall
- Sha'ar HaTzafon Mall

=== Hadera ===
- Ganei Hadarim
- Hadera Mall
- Lev Hadera Mall
- Mall Ha'Hof Village
- Mul Hakikar Mall
- Center Park

=== Pardes Hana Karkur ===
- Alon Ein Shemer Fashion

=== Or Akiva ===
- Orot Mall

== Northern District ==
=== Afula ===
- Amakim Mall

=== Tiberias ===
- BIG Fashion Danilof Mall
- BIG Tiberias
- Tiberias Central Bus Station

=== Tamra ===
- Tamra Mall

=== Yarka ===
- Canaan Mall
- City Mall
- Big Fashion Yarka Mall

=== Karmiel ===
- Ḥucot Karmiˀel Mall
- Kikkar ha ʕir Mall
- Lev Karmiel Mall

=== Nazareth ===
- Big Fashion Mall

=== Nof HaGalil ===
- Ofer Dodge Center

=== Ma'alot-Tarshiha ===
- Kochav Hatsafon

=== Kiryat Shmona ===
- Nehemya Mall

=== Nahariya ===
- Arena Nahariya Mall
- Nahariya Mall (HaTzafon Mall)

=== Rosh Pinna ===
- Galil Center

=== Akko ===
- Acre Mall
- Azrieli Akko

== Jerusalem District ==
=== Jerusalem ===
- Center One
- Central Bus Station Mall
- Clal Center
- Hadar Mall
- Lev Talpiyot
- Malha Mall
- Mamilla Mall
- Ramot Mall
- Rav Chen Mall
- Yisrael Talpiot Mall

=== Beit Shemesh ===
- BIG Beit Shemesh
- Naimi Mall
- Sha'ar HaIr Mall

=== Mevaseret Zion ===
- Harel Mall
- Mevaseret Mall

== Southern District ==
=== Arad ===
- Arad Mall

=== Ashdod ===
- Ashdod Mall
- Big Fashion Ashdod
- City Mall
- Lev Ashdod
- Sea Mall
- Star Center

=== Ashkelon ===
- Giron Mall
- Hutzot Mall
- Lev Ashkelon
- Marina Mall

=== Beersheba ===
- Avia Mall
- BIG Beersheba
- Grand Canyon Beersheba
- Ispro Planet
- Kiryat HaMemeshala Mall
- Negev Mall
- ONE Plaza
- Shaul HaMelekh Mall

=== Eilat ===
- Ice Mall
- Mall HaYam Mall

=== Kiryat Gat ===
- Gat Center
- Lev Ha'Ir Mall
- BIG Kiryat Gat

=== Mitzpe Ramon ===
- Even Derech Center

=== Sderot ===
- Lev HaIr

=== Tamar Regional Council ===
- Dead Sea Mall
- Sky Blue Mall
