= Matza restaurant suicide bombing =

2002 Palestinian militant attack in Haifa, Israel

- Part of the Second Intifada militancy campaign
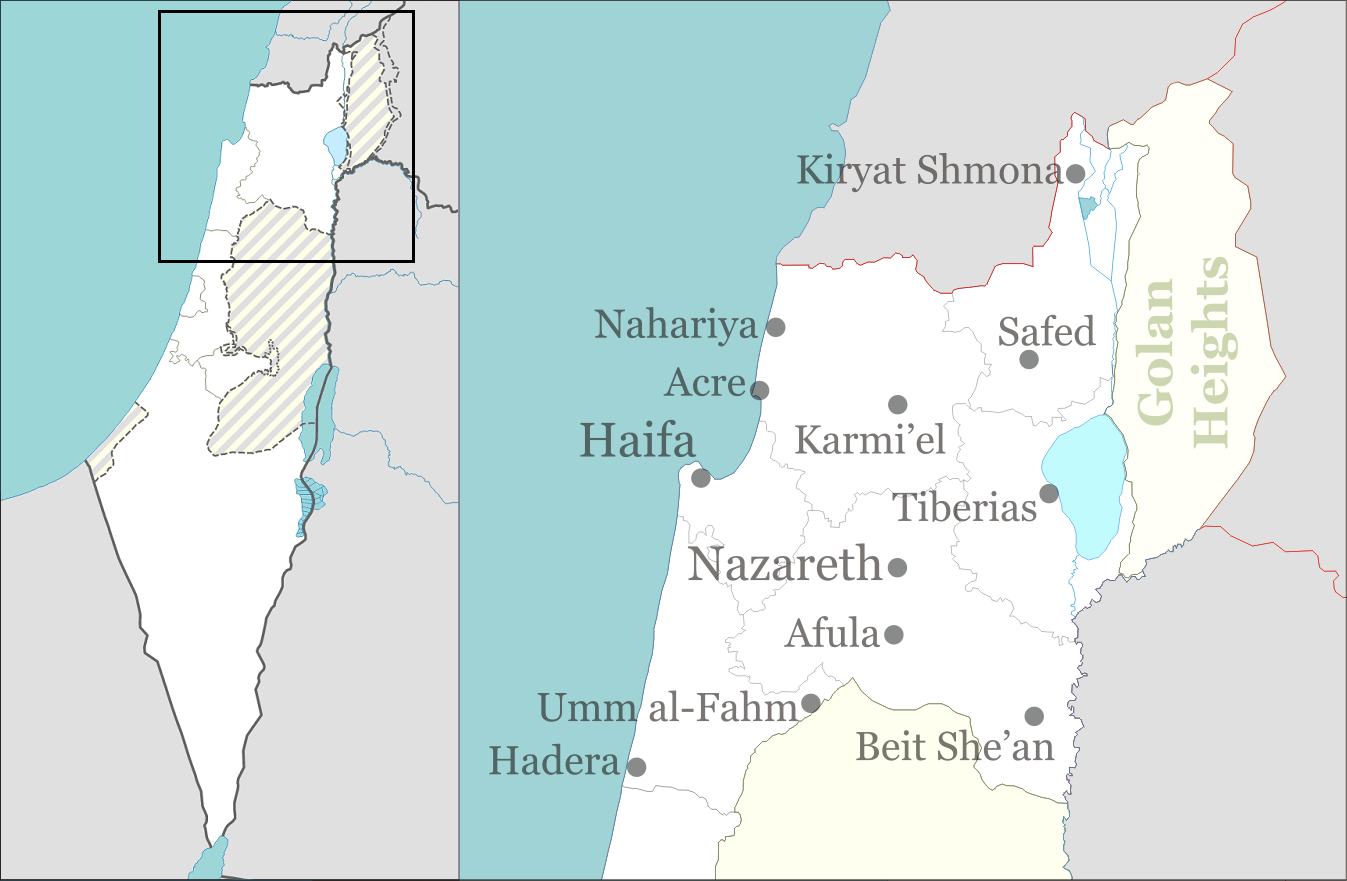
- The attack site
- Native name: הפיגוע במסעדת מצה
- Location: 32°47′19″N 35°0′9″E; Haifa, Israel
- Date: 31 March 2002; 24 years ago c. 3:00 pm (UTC+2)
- Attack type: Suicide bomber
- Deaths: 16 (+1 bomber)
- Injuries: 40+
- Perpetrator: Hamas claimed responsibility
- Assailant: Shadi Tobassi

The Matza restaurant suicide bombing occurred on 31 March 2002, when a Palestinian Hamas suicide bomber detonated his bomb inside the Matza restaurant in Haifa, Israel, near the Grand Canyon shopping mall, killing 16 people and injuring over 40. Reporting has described the cafe as both "Arab-owned" and "owned by Israeli Jews, but run by Palestinian citizens of Israel". Jews and Arabs were among those killed and injured.

== Victims ==
14 people were killed in the bombing attack, including two fathers and their children.

- Aviel Ron, 54, of Haifa (killed along with his two children)
- Anat Ron, 21, of Haifa
- Ofer Ron, 18, of Haifa
- Shimon Koren, 55, of Haifa (killed along with his two sons)
- Ran Koren, 18, of Haifa
- Gal Koren, 15, of Haifa
- Adi Shiran, 17, of Haifa (Shimon's daughter)
- Shimon Shiran, 57, of Haifa (died of his injuries years later on 11 April 2009)
- Suheil Adawi, 32, of Turan
- Dov Chernobroda, 67, of Haifa
- Moshe Levin, 52, of Haifa
- Danielle Menchel, 22, of Haifa
- Orly Ofir, 16, of Haifa
- Ya'akov Shani, 53, of Haifa
- Daniel Carlos Wegman, 50, of Haifa
- Carlos Yerushalmi, 52, of Karkur (died of his injuries the next day on 1 April 2002)

== The perpetrators ==
The military wing of Hamas claimed responsibility for the attack, stating that it was in retaliation for Israeli raids on Palestinian cities and towns, including Ramallah where the then President of the Palestinian National Authority, Yasser Arafat, was under siege. A Hamas spokesman stated that the suicide bomber was a 22-year-old Palestinian named Shadi Tubasi. Tubasi came from a refugee camp near Jenin area that had recently been invaded by Israeli forces.

== Response ==
Haifa mayor, Amram Mitzna, said : "Arabs and Jews have long coexisted peacefully in Haifa. Hopefully, the spirit of Haifa ... will become the spirit of all the region. We must find a way to live with each other and not to fight against each other" .

== See also ==
- Palestinian political violence
- Israeli casualties of war
