= New Jezreel Valley railway =

Railway line in Israel

New Jezreel Valley railway מסילת העמק

Overview
- Owner: Israel Railways
- Termini: HaMifrats Central railway station (Haifa); Beit She'an railway station
- Stations: 5

Service
- Type: Commuter Rail
- Operator: Israel Railways

History
- Opened: October 16, 2016

Technical
- Line length: 60 km (37 mi)
- Track gauge: 1435 mm

The New Jezreel Valley Railway (Hebrew: מסילת העמק) is a railway of Israel Railways (IR), which connects Haifa with Beit She'an in the Jezreel Valley. The railway line was opened to the public on October 16, 2016. It is a successor to the 1905 Ottoman Jezreel Valley railway.

== History ==
The railway passes almost identically on the old western section of the former Haifa - Dar'ā railway line which was shut down in 1951. Since the 1990s, there have been repeated attempts to re-create the Jezreel Valley railway line. On the one hand, this is one of the most productive agricultural areas of Israel; on the other hand, the traffic in the Greater Haifa area, especially by commuters, is heavily overloaded.

In 2011, the plans for the new railway line were approved. Construction of the line began in 2012, and the railway line was completed in 2016. On August 29, 2016, the route was inaugurated by the Israeli Minister of Transportation, Israel Katz. The construction cost was just over $1 billion.

The railway line was opened to the public on October 16, 2016.

An extension of the railway line to Israel's border with Jordan, and maybe into Jordan, is currently being considered.

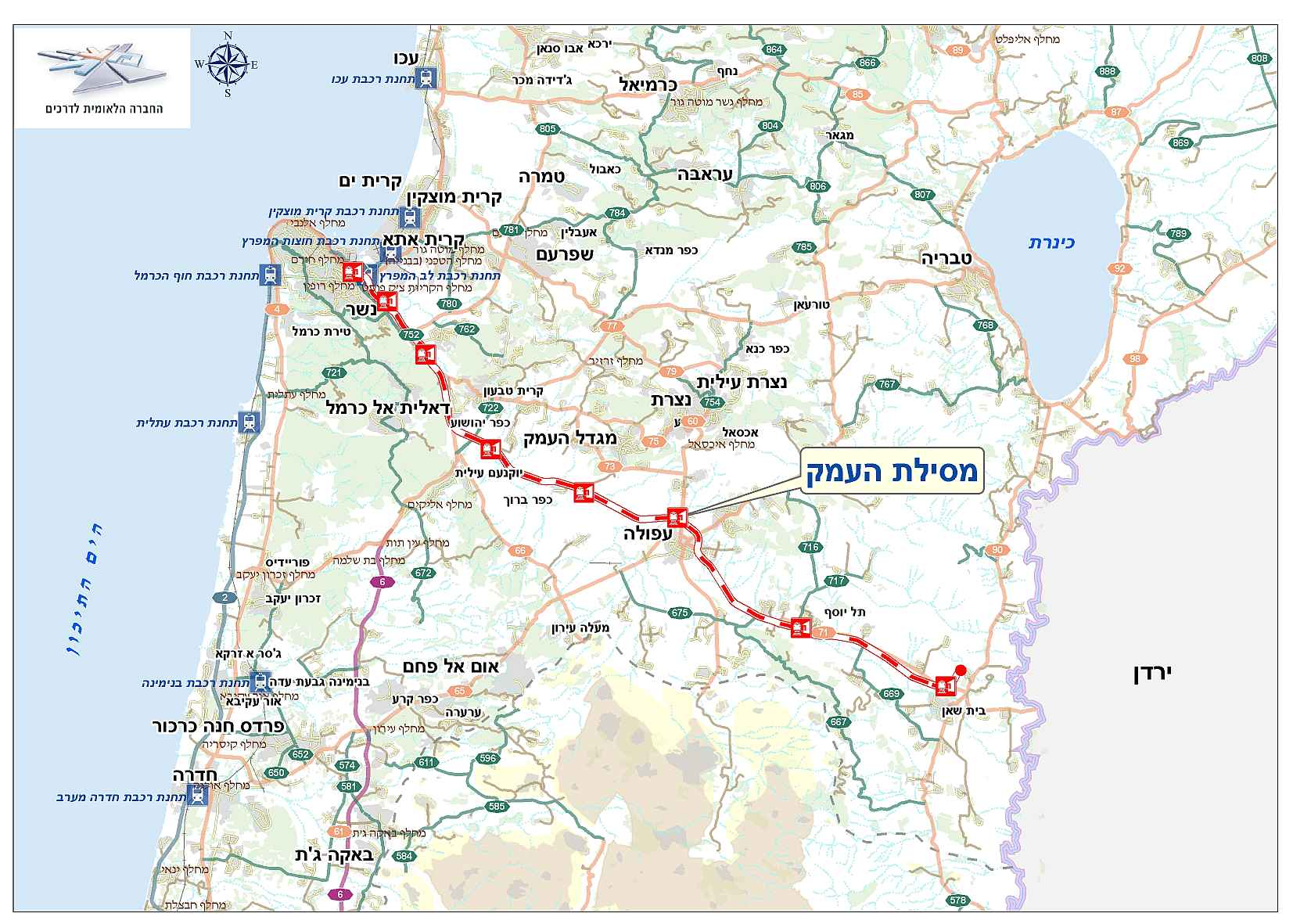
The Israel Valley Railroad Route: from Haifa to Beit She'an

== See also ==
- Jezreel Valley railway
