= Uri Michaeli Haifa International Airport =

International airport in Haifa, Israel

Haifa Airport נמל התעופה חיפה مطار حيفا
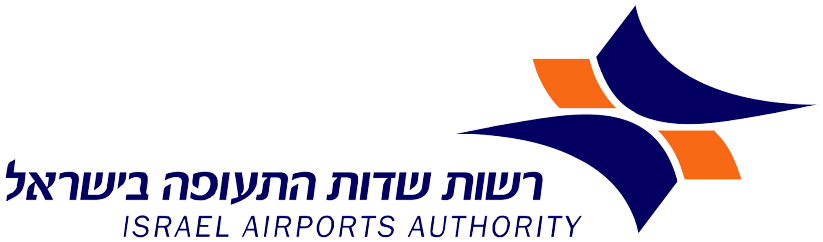

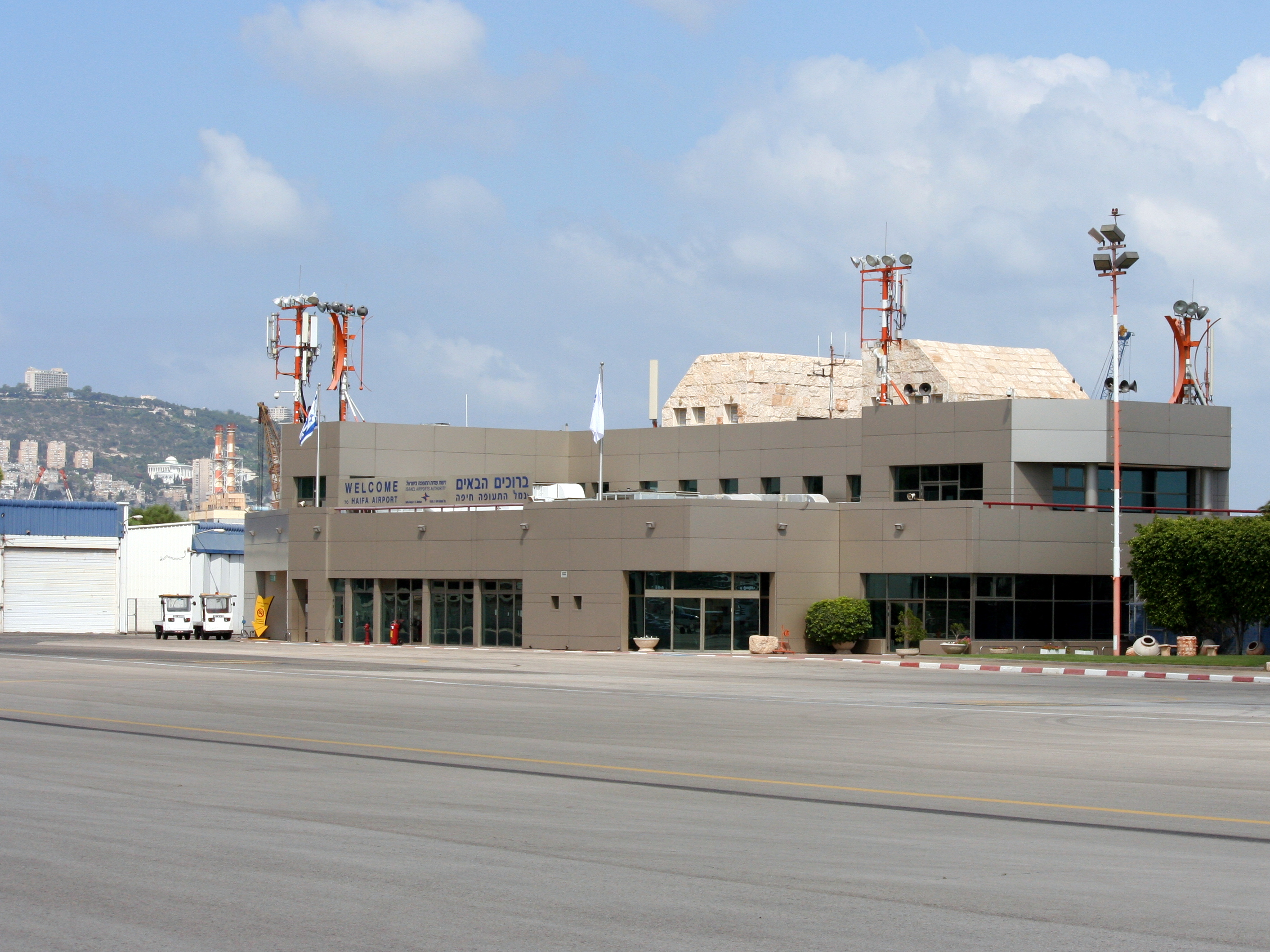
- IATA: HFA; ICAO: LLHA

Summary
- Airport type: Military/Public
- Operator: Israel Airports Authority
- Serves: Haifa, Israel
- Location: Haifa District, Israel
- Hub for: airHaifa
- Elevation AMSL: 28 ft (8.5 m)
- Coordinates: 32°48′34″N 35°02′35″E
- Website: IAA Haifa Airport

Map
- Location within Haifa region of Israel Location within Israel

Runways
Direction	Length		Surface
Direction	ft	m	Surface
15/33	4,324	1,318	Asphalt

Statistics (2025)
- Passengers: 282,227
- Passenger traffic change: ▲959.4%
- Aircraft movements: 22,216
- Aircraft movements change: ▲100.1%
- Sources: Israel Airports Authority

Haifa Airport (Hebrew: נְמַל הַתְּעוּפָה חֵיפָה, Namal HaTe'ufa Haifa; Arabic: مطار حيفا) (IATA: HFA, ICAO: LLHA), also known as Uri Michaeli Airport, is an international airport in Haifa, Israel. It is Israel's oldest international airport and the third-busiest (in terms of passenger traffic). Located to the east of the city, close to Port of Haifa and Israel Shipyards, Haifa Airport serves scheduled and charter flights as well as general aviation, with some military usage. The airport is named after Uri Michaeli, one of the pioneers of Jewish aviation and one of the founders of aviation in Israel. The airport has one short runway, 1,318 metres (4,324 ft) in length, and there are plans to extend it by 316 metres (1,037 ft).

== History ==
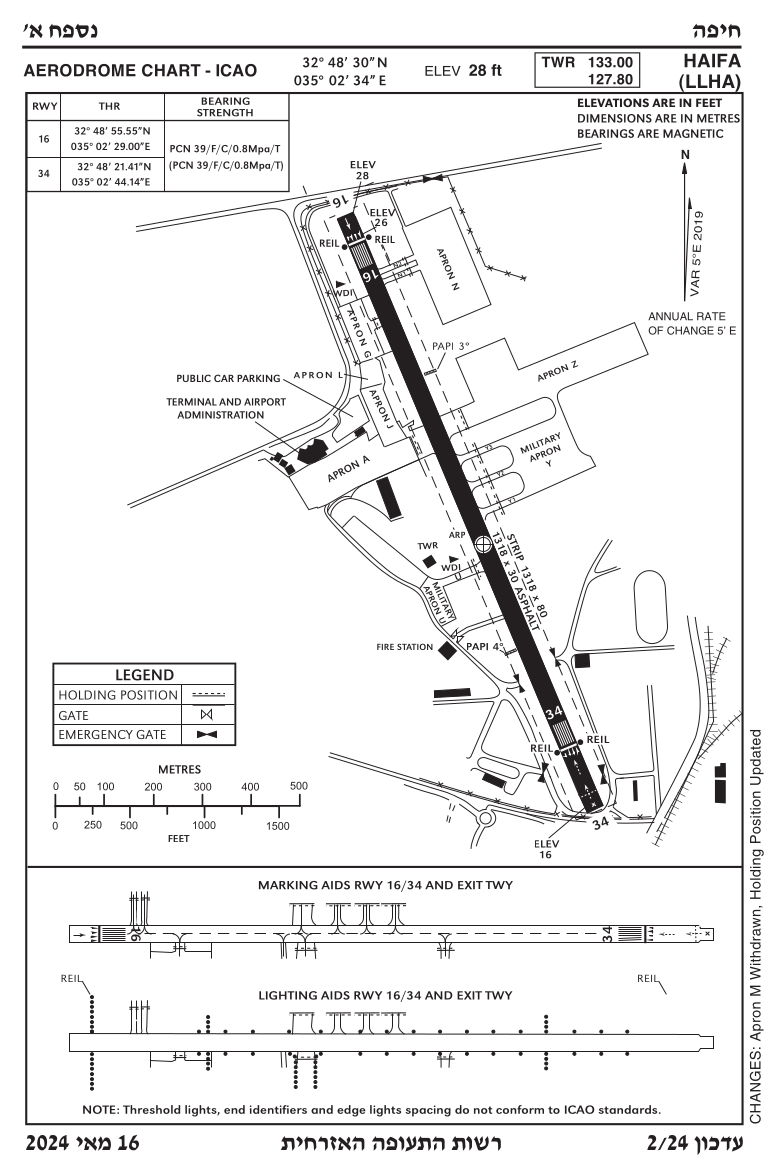
Haifa Airport chart

=== British Mandate ===
Haifa Airport was established by the British Mandate in 1934 as its first international airport at the location of RAF Haifa, which originally served the Iraq Petroleum Company and the British Army. RAF Haifa already had passenger service by Imperial Airways to Alexandria (since 1931) and Baghdad (since 1932). In 1936 passenger Misr Airwork operated flights to Baghdad, Beirut, Cyprus and Lydda. In 1937, these were joined by Palestine Airways services, as well as Ala Littoria regular services to Brindisi and Trieste via Athens. In 1938 a third of the flights into Mandatory Palestine landed in Haifa; but in 1940, civil flights were stopped due to the Second World War in which the airport served the Royal Air Force's operations in the Middle East as RAF Haifa. The RAF station closed in 1948, and the airport re-opened as Haifa Airport.

The British Royal Air Force used the Haifa airport between 1918 and 1948.

List of Operational units that flew from Haifa

- No. 6 Squadron RAF detachment (1938–1939) Hawker Hardy
- No. 30 Squadron RAF detachment (1940) Bristol Blenheim
- No. 80 Squadron RAF (1941) Hawker Hurricane I
- No. 112 Squadron RAF detachment (1941) Curtiss Tomahawk I
- No. 142 Squadron RAF detachment (1918) Royal Aircraft Factory B.E.2
- No. 144 Squadron RAF detachment (1919) de Havilland DH.9
- No. 208 Squadron RAF detachment (1941) Hawker Audax
- No. 213 Squadron RAF (1941) Hawker Hurricane I
- No. 260 Squadron RAF (1941) Hawker Hurricane I
- No. 261 Squadron RAF (1942) Hawker Hurricane I
- No. 450 Squadron RAAF (1941) Hawker Hurricane I
- No. 651 Squadron RAF (1948) Auster AOP6

=== Israel ===
==== 20th century ====
The airport reopened for passenger traffic in 1948 with flights operated by Cyprus Airways. This was followed ten years later by Arkia Israel Airlines flights. It was not until 1994, however, that the airport received international status, and at this time, it was planned that the airport would serve flights to destinations across Europe. Less than a year later, the airport was placed for sale. At this time, great interest in the site was shown by the French construction group, Bouygues, as well as British Aerospace.

In 1998, a new terminal was opened.

==== 21st century ====
In 2001, talks over the airport expanding restarted when then Finance Minister, Silvan Shalom called for an 800 million NIS upgrade to turn the airport into one of an international standard.

Since December 2024 the newly established Israeli airline airHaifa, based at Haifa Airport, operates flights to several domestic and international destinations over the Eastern Mediterranean. Further flights to other East Mediterranean destinations are also expected soon.

On 19 August 2025 Haifa Airport’s first-ever 200 m^{2} duty-free store was opened. The store opened in a ceremony with Sharon Kedmi, CEO of the Israel Airports Authority, and the co-CEOs of LAYAM — the Teddy Sagi Group company that will operate the store.

The Israel Airports Authority intends to extend the runway to 1,634 m (5,361 ft) sometime in the 2020s. This will involve extending the runway northwards, across Julius Simon Road, which will then pass in a tunnel underneath the runway.

== Airlines and destinations ==
As of December 2025, airport operates scheduled flights to Eilat (Israel), Bulgaria, Cyprus and Greece.

Airlines	Destinations
airHaifa	Athens, Eilat, Larnaca, Paphos, Thessaloniki; Seasonal: Heraklion, Karpathos, Rhodes, Mykonos, Sofia

== Ground transportation ==
=== Bus and Taxi ===
The airport is served by Egged bus lines 100 and 18/18a connecting the airport with Haifa Bay central bus station, HaMifratz Central railway station and the nearby industrial district.

=== Rail ===
The closest train stations are HaMifratz Central railway station, Hutzot HaMifratz, and Kiryat Haim.

Bus line 100 (operated by Egged) connects the airport with HaMifratz Central railway station.

=== Car ===
The airport is located close to Highway 4 (Haifa – Tel Aviv highway) and Highway 22.

A fenced parking lot is available in front of the building, with about 100 parking spaces. Parking is free of charge. Vehicles may be parked on a temporary basis for a few days. Baggage carts are available in the parking lots, free of charge.

== Statistics ==
Statistics for Haifa Airport
Year	Total passengers	Passenger change	Total operations	Operations change
1999	130,571	Steady		Steady
2000	137,858	▲5.6%		Steady
2001	120,301	▼12.7%		Steady
2002	127,200	▲5.7%	20,587	Steady
2003	93,385	▼26.6%	16,978	▼17.5%
2004	70,831	▼24.2%	16,225	▼4.4%
2005	61,334	▼13.4%	13,082	▼19.4%
2006	52,388	▼14.6%	12,614	▼3.6%
2007	65,551	▲25.1%	13,531	▲7.3%
2008	64,809	▼1.1%	13,367	▼1.2%
2009	50,677	▼21.8%	8,714	▼34.8%
2010	83,131	▲64.0%	13,602	▲56.1%
2011	74,244	▼10.7%	12,067	▼11.3%
2012	78,033	▲5.1%	12,037	▼0.2%
2013	81,804	▲4.8%	15,969	▲32.7%
2014	102,578	▲25.4%	21,271	▲33.2%
2015	110,805	▲8.0%	18,197	▼14.5%
2016	119,113	▲7.5%	17,086	▼6.1%
2017	140,222	▲17.7%	19,168	▲12.2%
2018	87,552	▼37.6%	16,624	▼13.3%
2019	92,695	▲5.9%	17,729	▲6.6%
2020	77,963	▼15.9%	21,177	▲19.4%
2021	80,337	▲3.0%	25,435	▲20.1%
2022	69,677	▼13.3%	24,062	▼5.4%
2023	61,333	▼12.0%	19,563	▼18.7%
2024	26,641	▼56.7%	11,102	▼43.3%
2025	282,227	▲959.4%	22,216	▲100.1%

== See also ==
- Transportation in Israel
- Ben Gurion Airport
- Ramon Airport
- List of the busiest airports in Asia
- List of the busiest airports in the Middle East
- List of former Royal Air Force stations
