= Grand Canyon Beersheba =

- גרנד קניון באר שבע

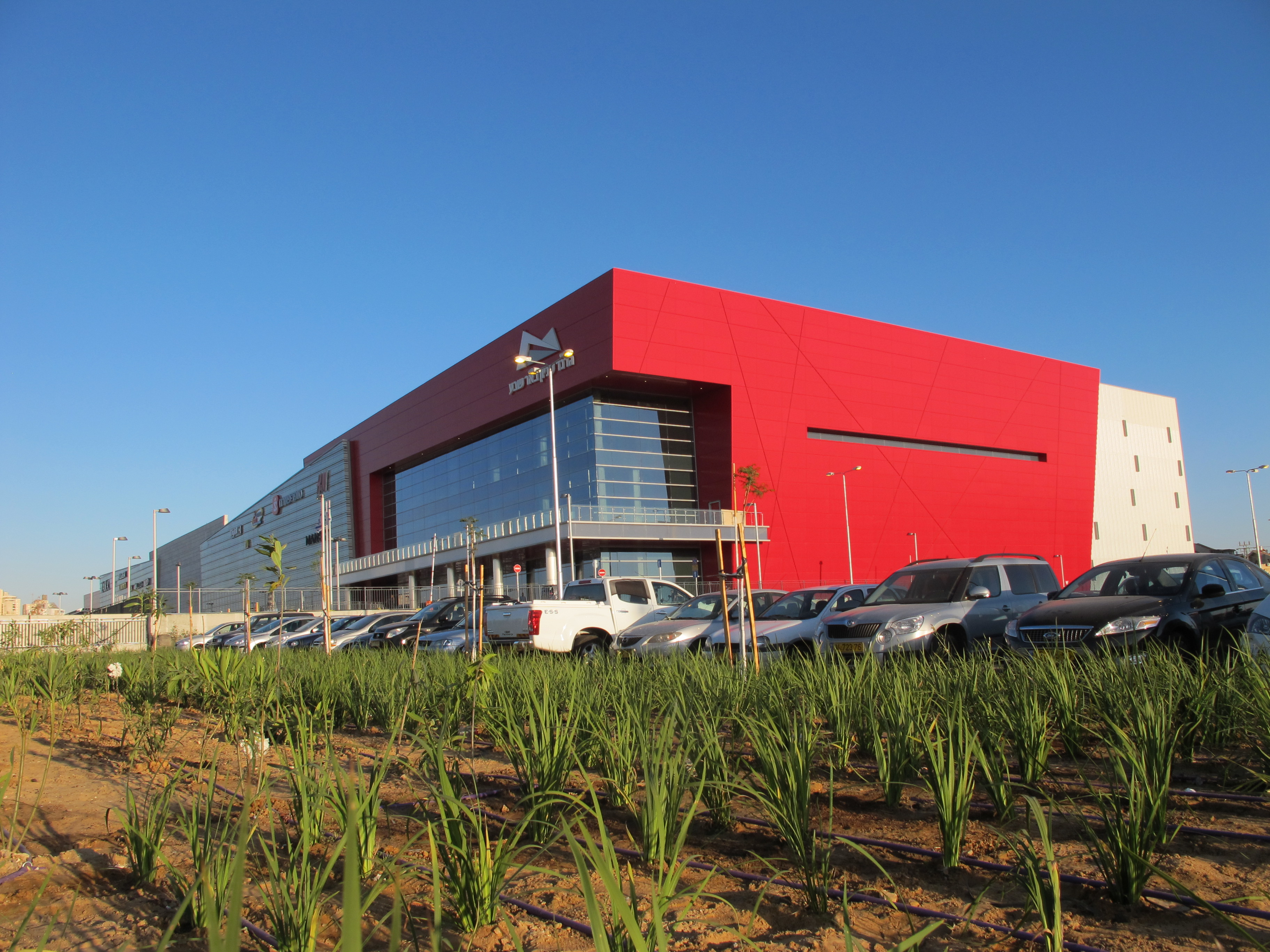
- The mall in 2013
- Location: Beersheba, Israel
- Coordinates: 31.2525°N 34.7915°E
- Address: 125 David Tuviahu Boulevard, Beersheba
- Opened: 2013
- Owner: Melisron Group
- Architect: MYS Architects (Architectural Firm)
- Num. of stores: 250
- Floors: 6
- Website: https://myofer.co.il/malls/beer-sheva/info

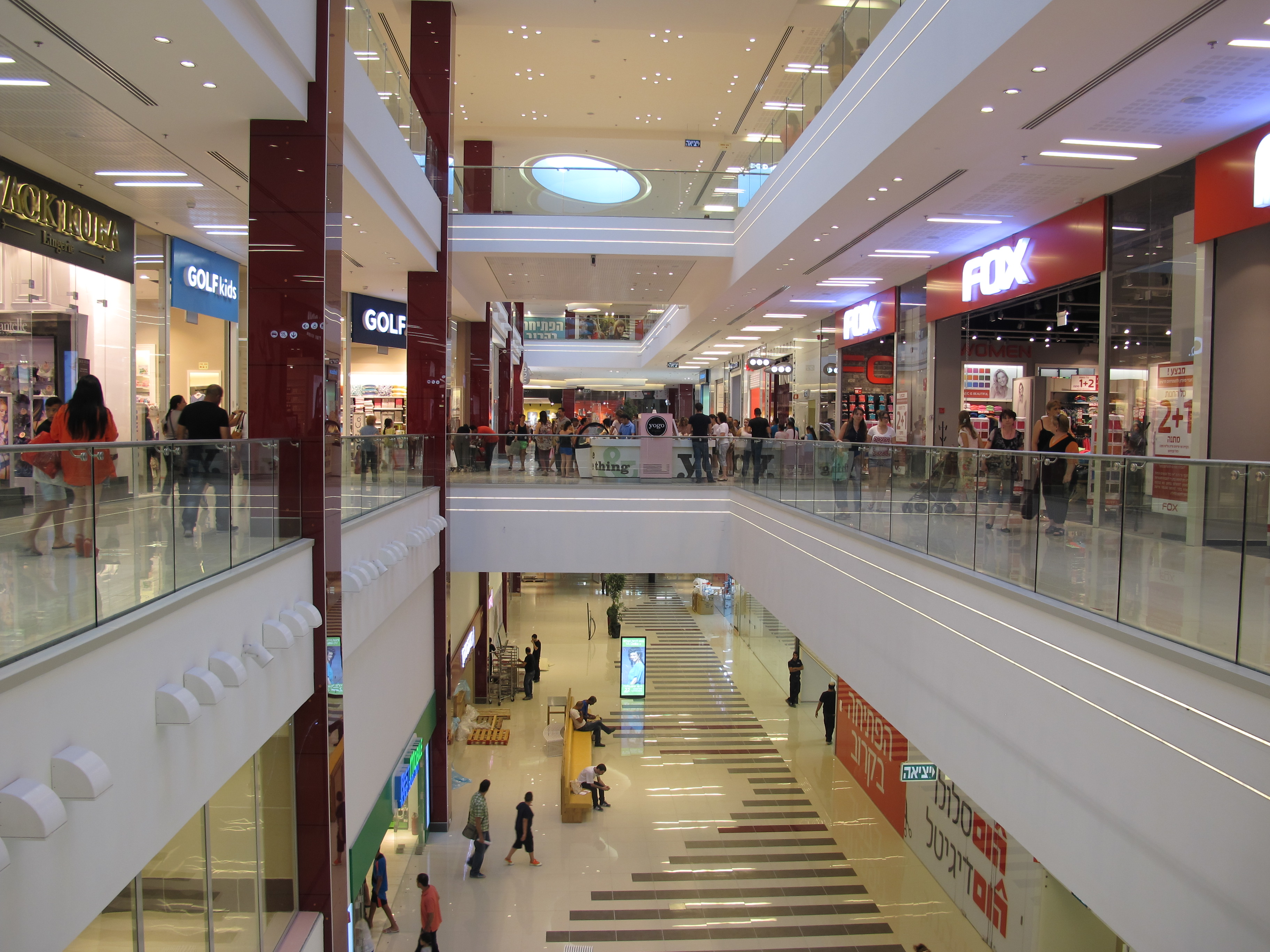
The mall during its opening week, May 2013

Grand Canyon Beersheba (also known as Grand Mall or Ofer Grand Canyon; Hebrew: גרנד קניון באר שבע) is a shopping center located on Road 25 in Beersheba, Israel. Opened on May 23, 2013, it occupies the site formerly home to the historic Neot Midbar Hotel. The center is part of the Ofer Group of shopping centers, owned by the Melisron Group.

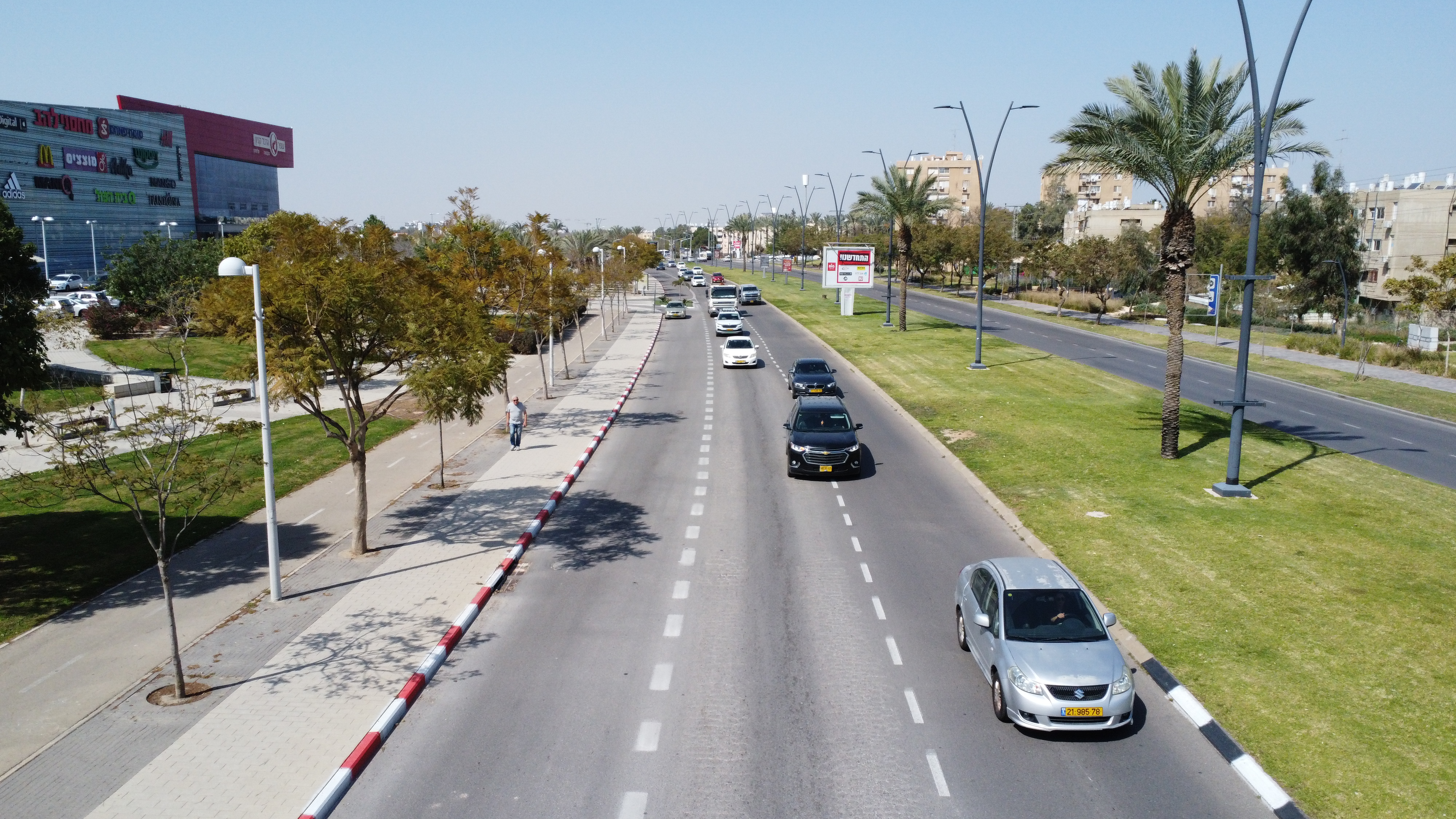
Road 25, Beersheba

The shopping center spans approximately 160,000 square meters, with 50,000 square meters allocated for commercial space, hosting around 250 stores. It is considered the largest in Israel by interior size, stretching roughly 273 meters in length. The design was executed by the architectural firm MYS Architects. It offers a diverse array of stores, including outlets for clothing, sportswear, dining, cafes, and a market. The top floor features a fast-food center, a video arcade, and a gym.

== Location and design ==
Situated in a residential area of Beersheba, Grand Canyon Beersheba was designed using modern mall architectural principles. Its oval-shaped, dual-wing layout enhances store visibility and allows for flexible interior configurations. Inspired by the upscale Ramat Aviv Mall in Tel Aviv, the center features multiple floors dedicated to business, shopping, and entertainment. The design incorporates large aluminum panels, natural stone, and ceramic glass to create a modern, open atmosphere, while skylights ensure abundant natural lighting.

== Ownership ==
Initially developed by the Sabag Group in collaboration with the Melisron Group, the shopping center became solely owned by the Melisron Group in May 2016 after Eli Lahav sold his 50% stake. The transaction valued the mall at about ₪1 billion (around $260 million).

== See also ==
- List of shopping malls in Israel
