= Air Haifa =

Israeli airline

Air Haifa אייר חיפה طيران حيفا
| IATA | ICAO | Call sign |
|---|---|---|
| E2 | HFA | AIR HAIFA |
- Founded: 2023; 3 years ago
- Operating bases: Uri Michaeli Haifa International Airport
- Hubs: Uri Michaeli Haifa International Airport
- Fleet size: 6
- Destinations: 10
- Headquarters: Haifa, Israel
- Website: airhaifa.com

Air Haifa (Hebrew: אייר חיפה, Arabic: طيران حيفا), stylized as airHaifa, is an Israeli airline operating flights from its hub Uri Michaeli Haifa International Airport.

== History ==
Air Haifa, the first new Israeli airline since the 1990s, was founded by Nir Zuk, the founder of Palo Alto Networks, and Shai Babad, the former director general of the Israeli Ministry of Finance and chief executive officer (CEO) of the Strauss Group. Among other founders are former El Al chief commercial officer Michael Strassburger, former ZIM CEO, Rafi Danieli, former vice president of operations for El Al, Lior Yavor, former CEO of El Al, Gonen Osishkin.

The company was officially registered on 20 March 2023.

The airline states that it is the first commercial airline to be established at Haifa Airport.

== Destinations ==
Air Haifa has launched operations on 30 September 2024, initially operating flights from Tel Aviv to Eilat until 11 October 2024, eventually launching flights from Haifa to Eilat and Larnaca, on 13 and 14 October 2024, respectively. Future plans include routes to Turkey.

Ticket sales on the airline's website began on 25 September 2024.

airHaifa operates following destinations:

| Country | City | Airport | Notes | Refs |
|---|---|---|---|---|
| Bulgaria | Sofia | Vasil Levski Sofia Airport | Seasonal | |
| Cyprus | Larnaca | Larnaca International Airport – Glafcos Clerides | | |
| Cyprus | Paphos | Paphos International Airport | | |
| Greece | Athens | Athens International Airport Eleftherios Venizelos | | |
| Greece | Heraklion | Heraklion International Airport "Nikos Kazantzakis" | Seasonal | |
| Greece | Karpathos | Karpathos Island National Airport | Seasonal | |
| Greece | Mykonos | Mykonos-Manto Mavrogenous Airport | Seasonal | |
| Greece | Rhodes | Rhodes International Airport "Diagoras" | Seasonal | |
| Greece | Thessaloniki | Thessaloniki Airport "Makedonia" | | |
| Israel | Eilat | Ramon Airport | | |
| Israel | Haifa | Uri Michaeli Haifa International Airport | Base | |
| Israel | Tel Aviv | David Ben Gurion International Airport | | |

In July 2026, Air Haifa said it plans to start operating flights between Ben Gurion Airport and Ramon Airport from late October, with up to 10 daily flights. It also announced its intention to expand activity from Haifa Airport by about 40% during the 2026–27 winter season.

== Fleet ==
As of September 2026, Air Haifa operates the following aircraft:

| Aircraft | In service | Orders | Passengers | Notes |
|---|---|---|---|---|
| ATR 72-600 | 4 | 2 | 72 | First aircraft was delivered on 28 July 2024, Second aircraft is ex Garuda Indonesia |
| ATR 72-600 | 2 | — | 78 | |
| Total | 6 | 2 | | |

=== Fleet development ===
In early July 2026, Air Haifa announced that it is expecting to receive two additional ATR 72-600 aircraft.
