= Haifa–Nazareth Light Rail =

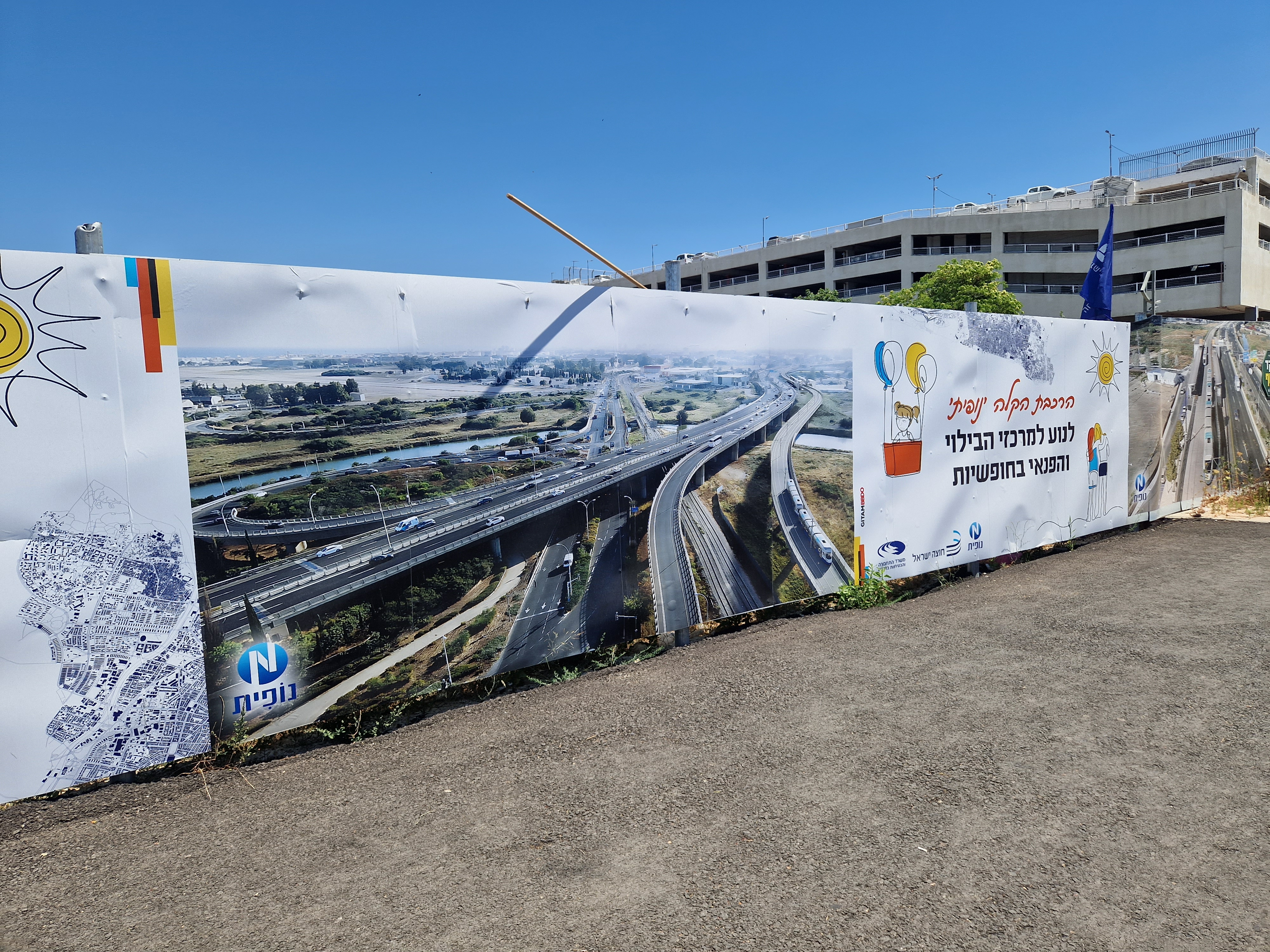
An advertisement sign for Nofit near HaMifrats Central Station

The Haifa–Nazareth Light Rail, known officially as Nofit (Hebrew: נופית), is an interurban tram line under construction in northern Israel, going from HaMifrats Central railway station in Haifa to Nazareth. The system is slated to open in 2029 and have a daily ridership of 100,000 passengers.

== History ==
The initial proposal and planning for the line were made as early as 2007. Plans were submitted by Haifa's development company Yefe Nof and approved by the National Planning Committee in February 2017. Further planning and construction will be managed by the Cross–Israel Highway company. It is to be constructed in two stages. The first stage involves civil engineering works to build the necessary infrastructure such as roads, bridges, and parking facilities, while the second stage, which will be done under a public-private partnership, will involve the installation of railway infrastructure, track laying, and the procurement of rolling stock. Construction works on the line began in January 2021. Two tenders have been published for the construction of tunnels and bridges. 6 companies have passed the pre-qualification stage for the tender to build and operate the line.

== Route ==
The inter-city route will start at the HaMifrats Central railway station in Haifa, continue through northern Kiryat Ata and go along Highway 79 from Somekh Interchange to the end of the highway in Reineh. It will end on Ma'aleh Yitzhak Street in Nof HaGalil, where the urban section will start. The urban section will continue through Nof HaGalil by way of Ma'aleh Yitzhak, and terminate in central Nazareth. Eight interurban stations will be built: two in Haifa (HaMifrats Central railway station and Vulcan Junction), three in Kiryat Ata, as well as one each in Shefa-'Amr, the Yiftachel Interchange, the northern entrance of Nazareth, and an area adjacent to Reineh and Mashhad. Two municipal stations will be built, one in Nof HaGalil and the other in Nazareth.

=== Development along the route ===
Up to nine park and ride facilities will be built along the route.

=== Possible expansions ===
An expansion to the Krayot has been proposed, going along Highway 22, to serve the neighbourhoods constructed in the 2010s in Kiryat Bialik.

== Specifications ==
The train will travel at up to 100 km/h (62 mph) on the inter-city section, and up to 50 km/h (31 mph) on the urban section. There will be 20 stations, ten inter-city and nine urban. The system's depot will be in Kiryat Ata. The line is expected to serve 12,000 daily passengers when it opens. The cost of construction is expected to be ILS 6.4 billion. The length of the line will be 41km.
