= Matthew Liard =

English engraver

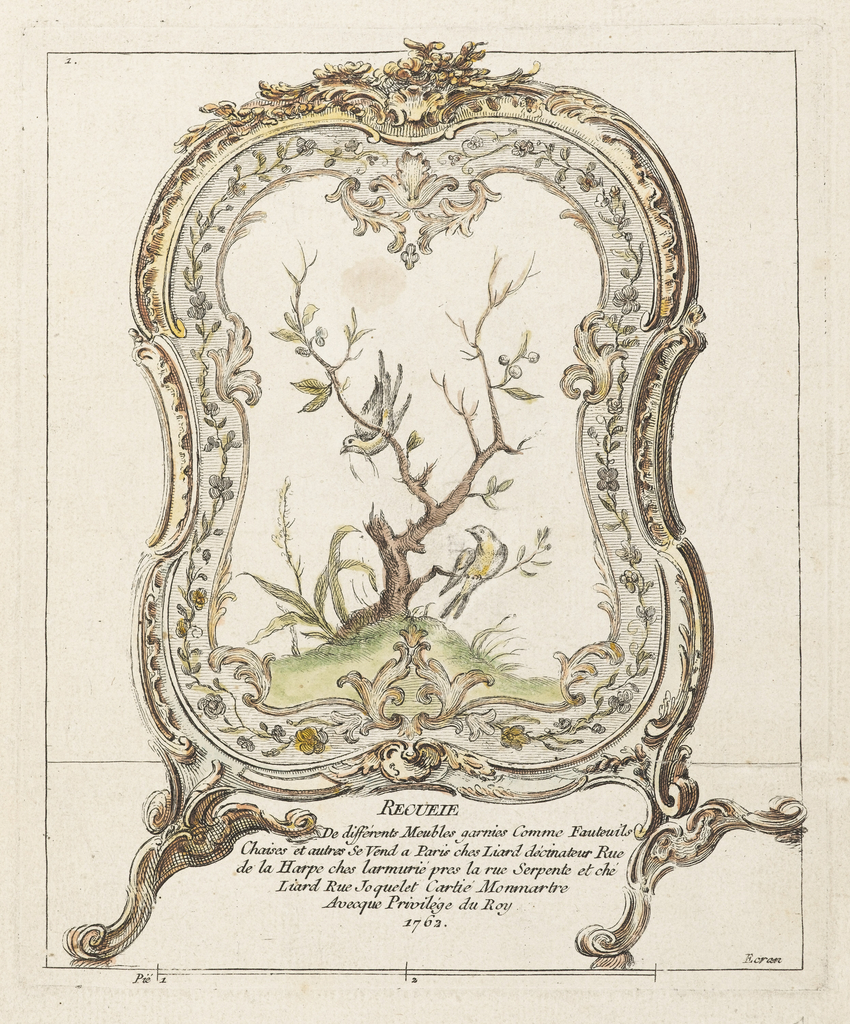
Recueil de différents Muebles garniers Comme Fauteuils/Chaises et autres... by Matthew Liard, 1762.

Matthew Liard (1736-1782) was an English engraver. His work is held in the collection of the Cooper-Hewitt, National Design Museum.
