= Grand Canyon of the Colorado River (Moran) =

1892–1908 painting by Thomas Moran

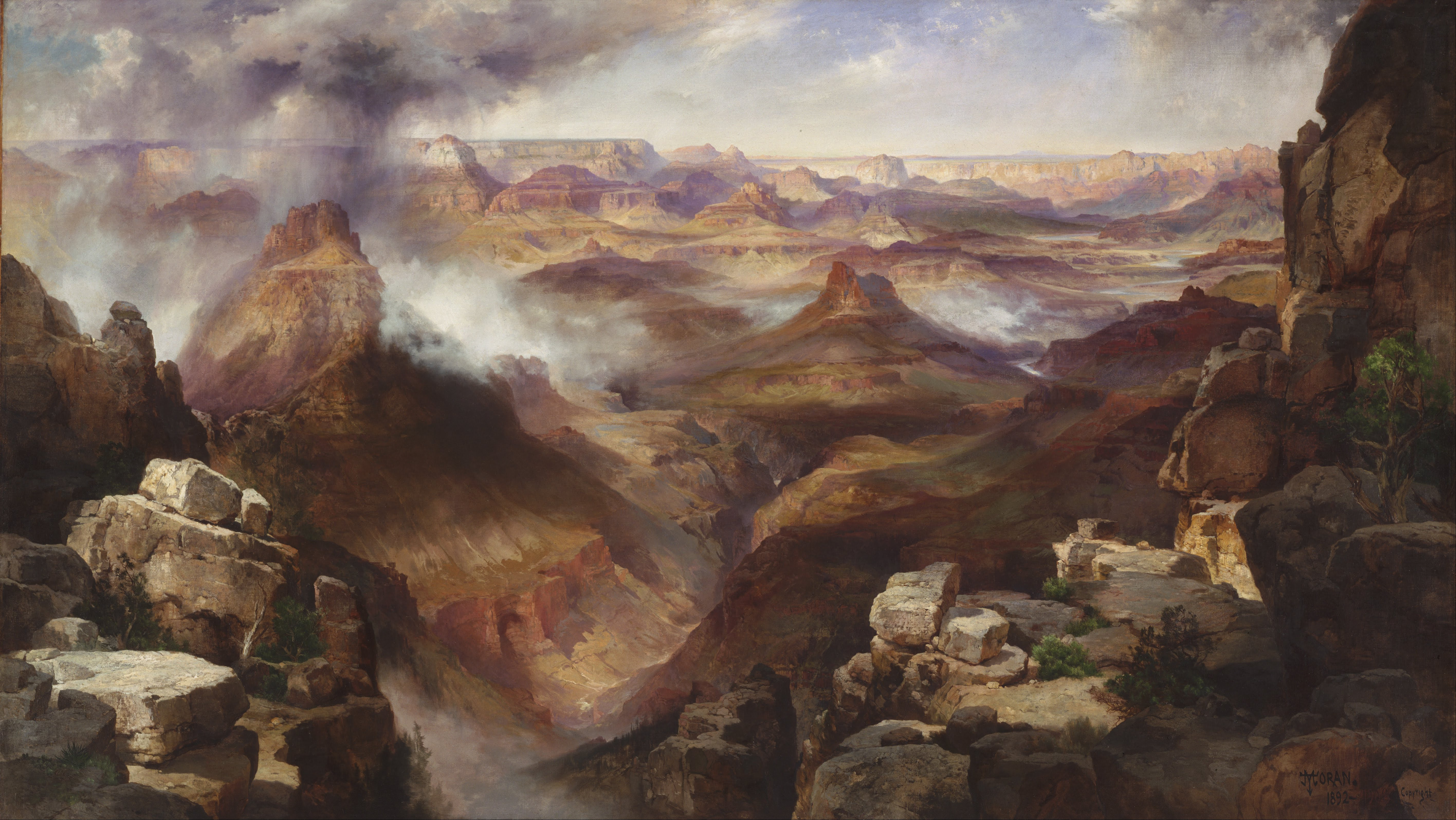
- Artist: Thomas Moran
- Year: 1892 and 1908
- Medium: Oil on canvas
- Subject: Grand Canyon
- Dimensions: 238.8 cm × 134.6 cm (94.0 in × 53.0 in)
- Location: Philadelphia Museum of Art, Philadelphia
- 39°57′57″N 75°10′53″W
- Website: philamuseum.org/collection/object/70115

Grand Canyon of the Colorado River is an oil on canvas painting by English–American artist Thomas Moran, created in 1892 and 1908. The painting is held at the Philadelphia Museum of Art.

== History and description ==
Moran had had a decades-long reputation as a leading landscape painter, especially of the American West, when he was commissioned by the Atchison, Topeka and Santa Fe Railway to create a painting of the Grand Canyon of the Colorado River with the purpose of helping to promote tourism and interest in that region. Moran created a painting with the unusually large dimensions of 238.8 cm × 134.6 cm (94 in × 53 in), in 1892. He worked on it again in 1908. It was gifted to the Philadelphia Museum of Art by Graeme Lorimer in 1975.

The painting depicts a vast, desolate landscape of the Grand Canyon of the Colorado River, mostly in gray and dark brown, extending towards the horizon, where can be seen rocky peaks, canyons and rivers, from a high point of view, while some clouds darken parts of the setting.
