= Grand Canyon (Missouri) =

Valley in the US state of Missouri

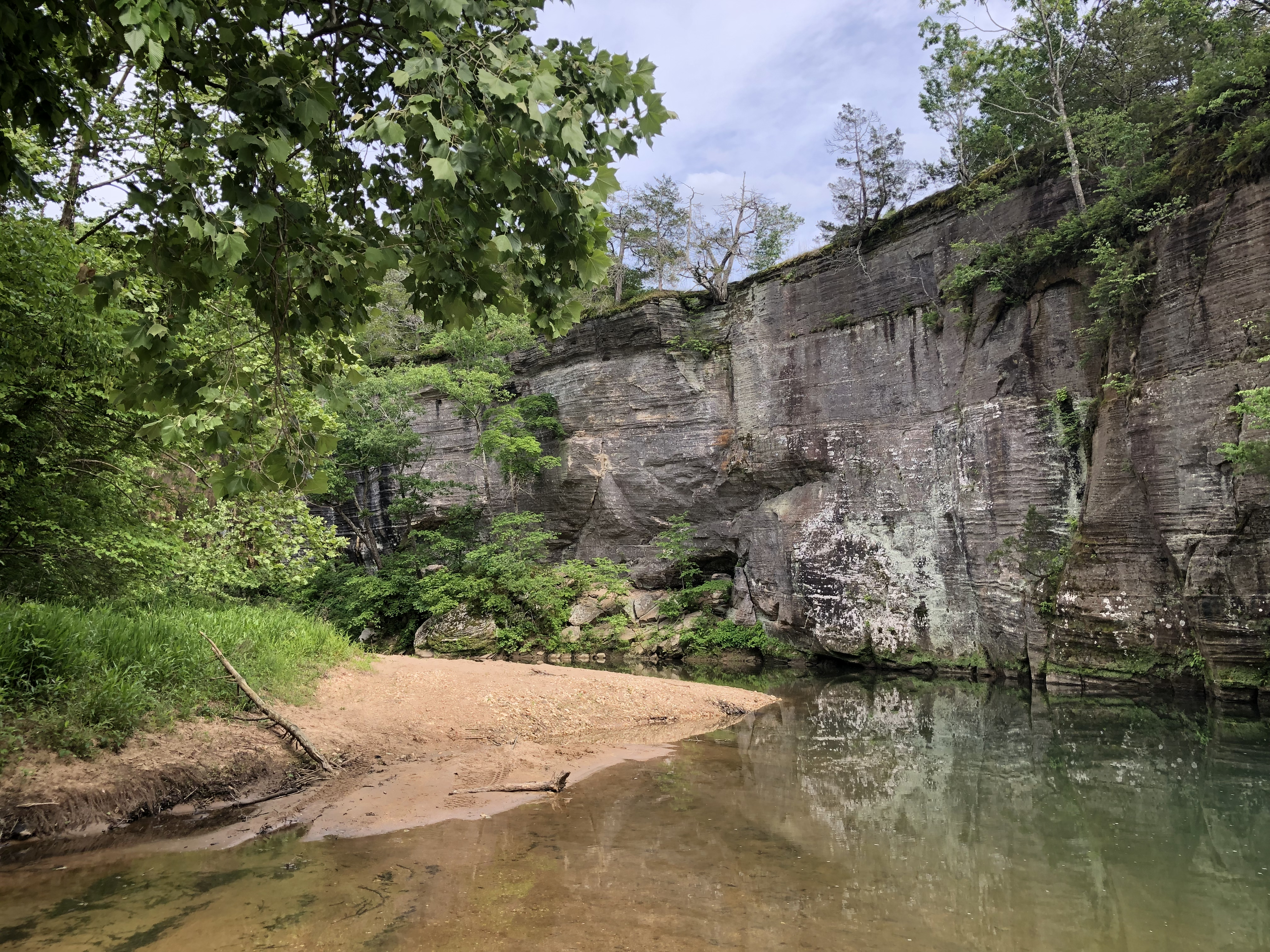
North end of Grand Canyon Missouri

Grand Canyon is a valley in Warren County in the U.S. state of Missouri. The valley is an approximately four mile section of Charrette Creek which has a relatively wide floodplain (about 0.25 mile wide) between high canyon walls (about 300 feet high). The north end of the "canyon" is at 38°43′18″N 91°05′21″W and the south or downstream end is at 38°39′32″N 91°06′14″W.

The name of the valley is an allusion to the Grand Canyon in Arizona.
