= Lev HaMifratz Mall =

Coordinates: 32°47′35.29″N 35°2′12.58″E

Lev HaMifratz Mall (Hebrew: קניון לב המפרץ, Kanyon Lev HaMifratz, lit. Heart of the Bay Mall),
- Location: Haifa, Israel
- Address: 55 HaHistadrut Ave, Lev Hamifratz Junction
- Opened: 1991
- Num. of stores: 83
- Floors: 3
- Website: www.israelmalls.net/mall.asp?mid=21

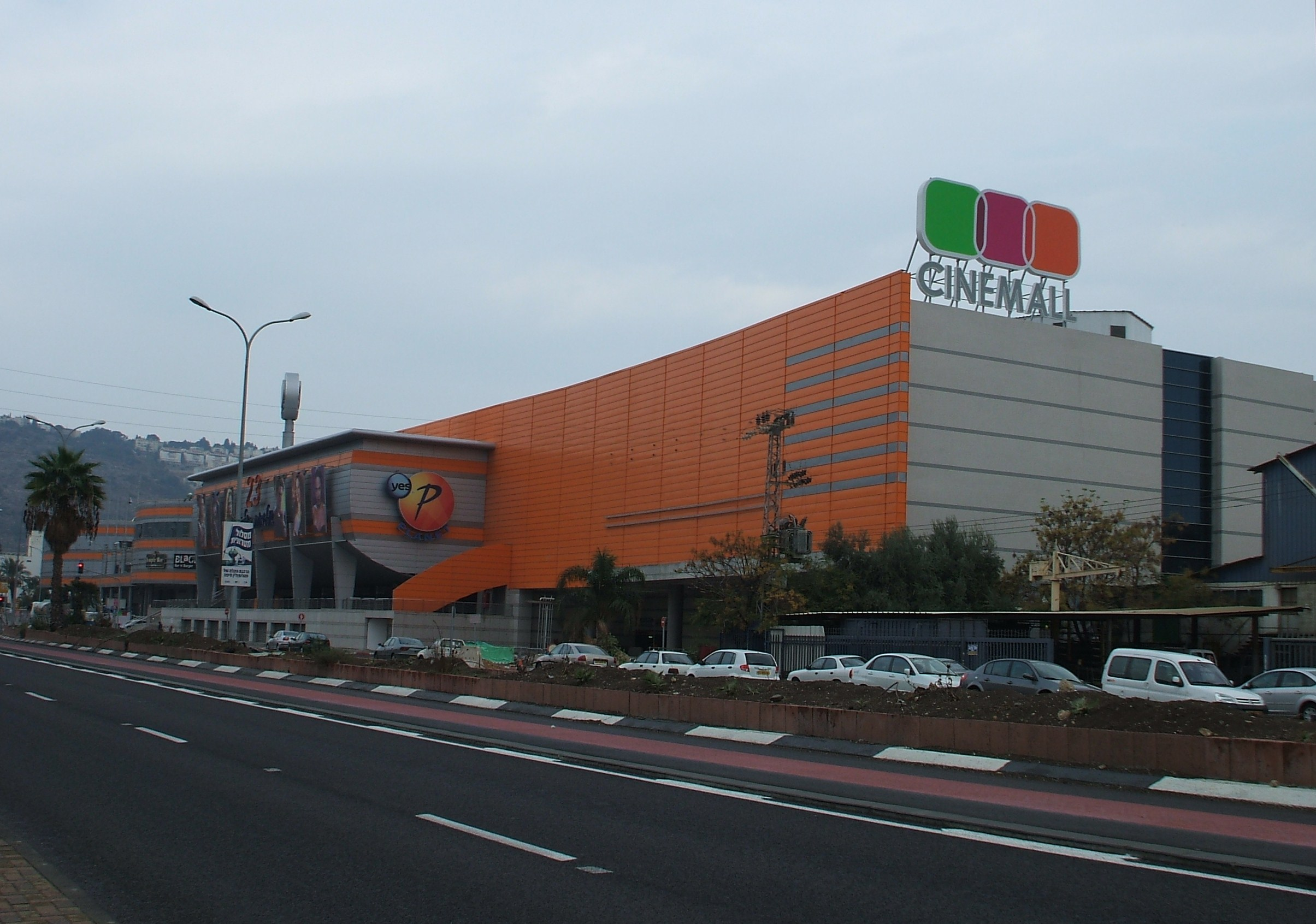
Lev Hamifratz Mall, officially known as Cinemall.

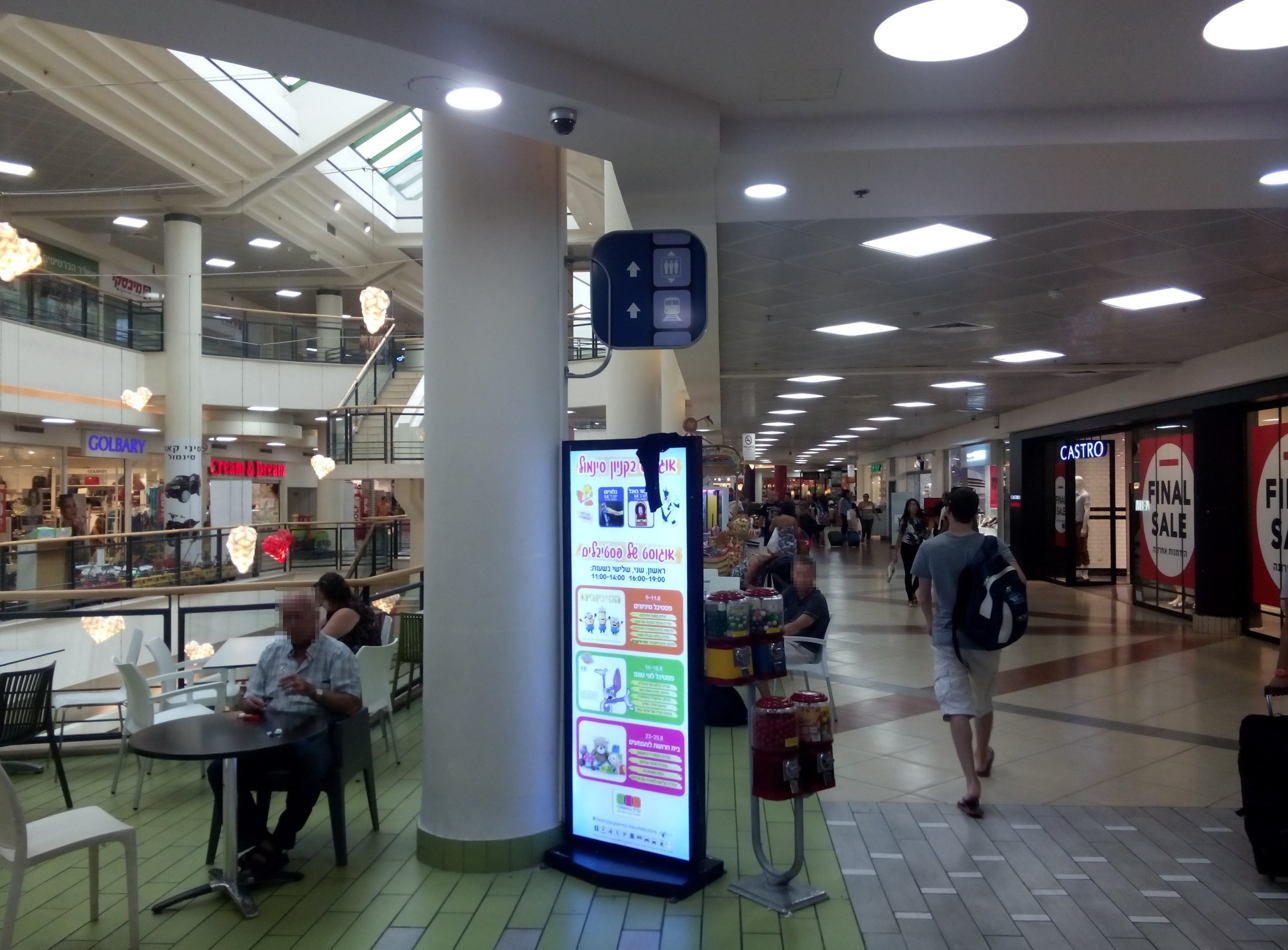
Interior of Lev HaMifratz Mall.

Lev HaMifratz Mall (Hebrew: קניון לב המפרץ, Kanyon Lev HaMifratz, lit. Heart of the Bay Mall), officially branded Cinemall, is a shopping mall located in Haifa, Israel.

Lev HaMifratz has three floors of stores, a food court, an underground parking garage, and an above ground parking garage. In the past, it included an amusement park, a miniature golf course and an ice skating rink.

The area around Lev HaMifratz is also a transportation hub. Behind it is a train station, with trains to Nahariya and Tel Aviv. The entrance to the station is from the above ground parking garage. It is also adjacent to the Haifa Bay Central Bus Station, which is the main junction between the Krayot and the city of Haifa.

During construction, the mall was hit by an Iraqi Scud missile in the course of the 1991 Gulf War.

== Attempted bombing ==
On March 21, 2009, the mall was the target of a failed terrorist bombing attack, which was thwarted when police sappers disarmed a bomb weighing at least a few dozen kilograms in a vehicle outside the mall on that Saturday night. Israeli police suspect that Hezbollah or another Iran-backed terrorist organization was attempting to perpetrate the bombing.

== See also ==
- List of shopping malls in Israel
