= Grand Canyon Airport =

Grand Canyon Airport can refer to several airports in Grand Canyon, Arizona:

- Grand Canyon Caverns Airport
- Grand Canyon National Park Airport
- Grand Canyon West Airport
- Grand Canyon Bar 10 Airport
