= José Liard =

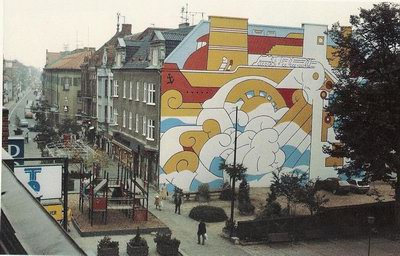
- José Liard mural; Trelleborg, 1981.
- Born: José Luis Liard; 10 September 1945 (age 81); Montevideo, Uruguay
- Known for: mural art/ fine art painting/ illustration/ Sceneography/ sculpture.

José Luis Liard (born 10 September 1945) is an artist, mural-painter, illustrator, designer and musician who works particularly in Sweden.

== Career ==
From 1966 to 1969, Liard was trained in art at the Escuela Nacional de Bellas Artes, Montevideo, Uruguay. His work has included mural and fine art painting, sculpture, and design for theatre and opera productions. His street sculptures can be seen in Buenos Aires.

Liard studied classical music, specializing in clarinet and saxophone, subsequently performing jazz, bebop, swing, and bossa nova influenced by Antonio Carlos Jobim and Latin American music genres. He has played with Montevideo Swing on Canal 4, Batuque do Samba, the Gospel Stompers, and with his own Liard Quartet and Liard/Schyman duo. Liard/Schyman performed for former Swedish Left Party leader, Gudrun Schyman.

Liard uses a variety of media in his work, particularly acrylic paint, ink, collage, and computers. He has painted large-scale murals; his 1981 mural in Trelleborg, at 400 m^{2}, is the largest in Sweden. His canvas paintings and drawings have been shown in group and solo exhibitions, particularly at the Liljevalchs Konsthall in Stockholm and the City Museum of Stockholm. He has contributed illustrations and caricatures to the journals Panorama (Argentina) and Kommentar (Sweden) and, in 1985, illustrations for a book of short stories by August Strindberg: Distress. In 2009 he illustrated 10 reasons to love Freud, a book in which various authors express their appreciation of Sigmund Freud.

Liard has worked in schools as a teacher and mentor, and has involved school students in the creation of murals. His engagement with young people and graffiti artists in multi-cultural areas of Malmo has been shown on Swedish Television.
