= Grand Canyon Haifa =

Grand Canyon Grand Kanyon
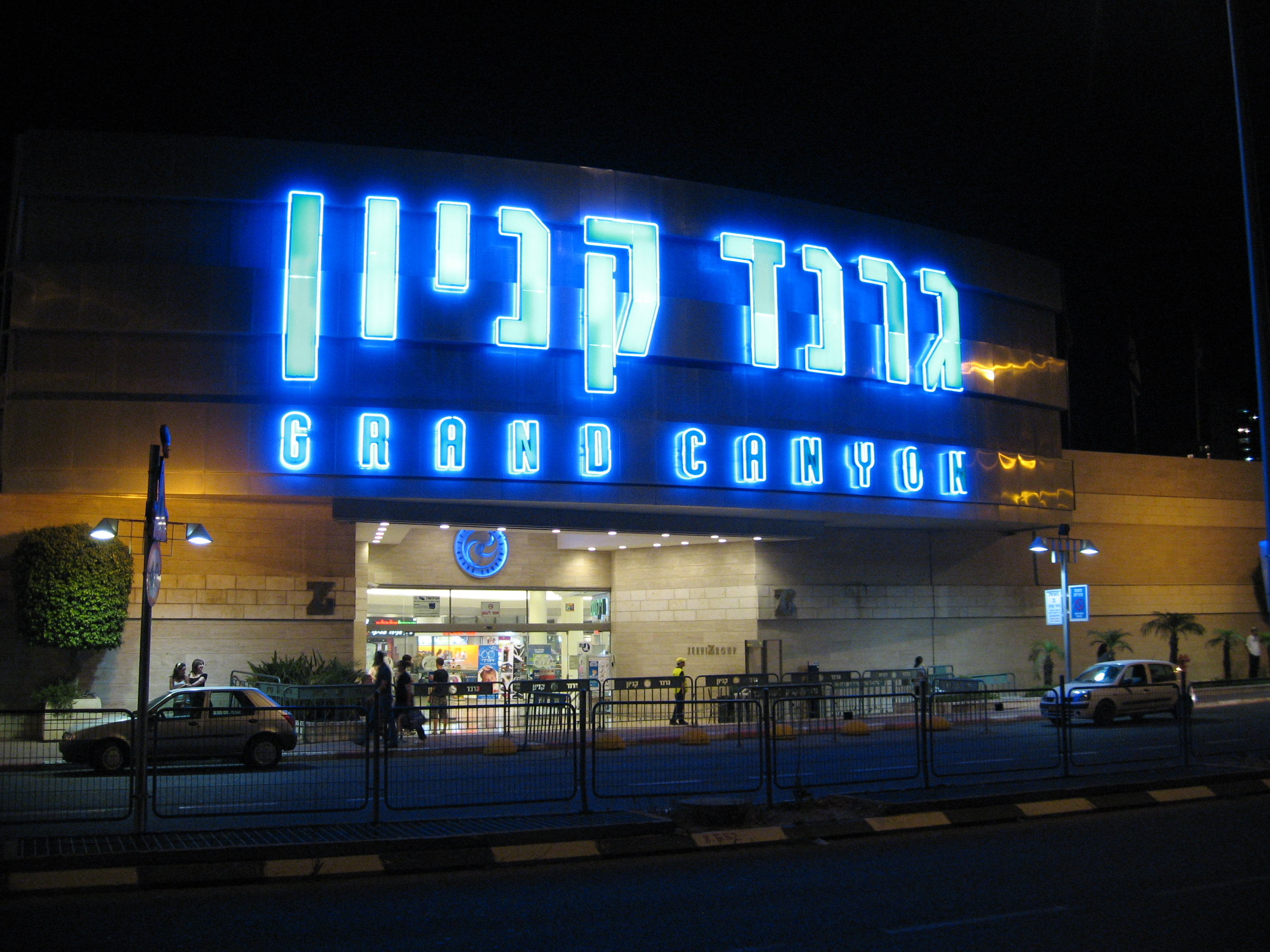
- The main entrance to the Grand Canyon at night in 2008
- Location: Haifa, Israel
- Coordinates: 32°47′22.89″N 35°0′28.18″E
- Opened: August 1999
- Num. of stores: 220
- Floor area: 200,000 m^{2} (2,200,000 sq ft)
- Floors: 3 (Retail floor), 7 total (Retail + Other Services)
- Parking: 3000 spaces
- Website: www.grandcanyon.co.il

The Grand Canyon (Hebrew: גרנד קניון, literally "Grand Mall," a play on words with the actual Grand Canyon) is the largest shopping mall in northern Israel, located in the northern city of Haifa.

It features 220 stores, of which approximately 80% are chain stores. Inside the mall there is also a 4,000 m^{2} (43,000 sq ft) spa, and a children's amusement park which closed in April 2014.

The mall opens half an hour after sunset on Saturday out of respect for the Jewish Sabbath. However, some stores and restaurants are open on Saturdays.

== Incidents ==
- On March 31, 2002, a Palestinian Hamas suicide bomber attacked the Matza restaurant located near the shopping mall, killing 16 people including children and injuring over 40.

== See also ==
- List of shopping malls in Israel
- Lev HaMifratz Mall
