= Ramat Aviv Mall =

Shopping mall in Tel Aviv, Israel

- קניון רמת אביב
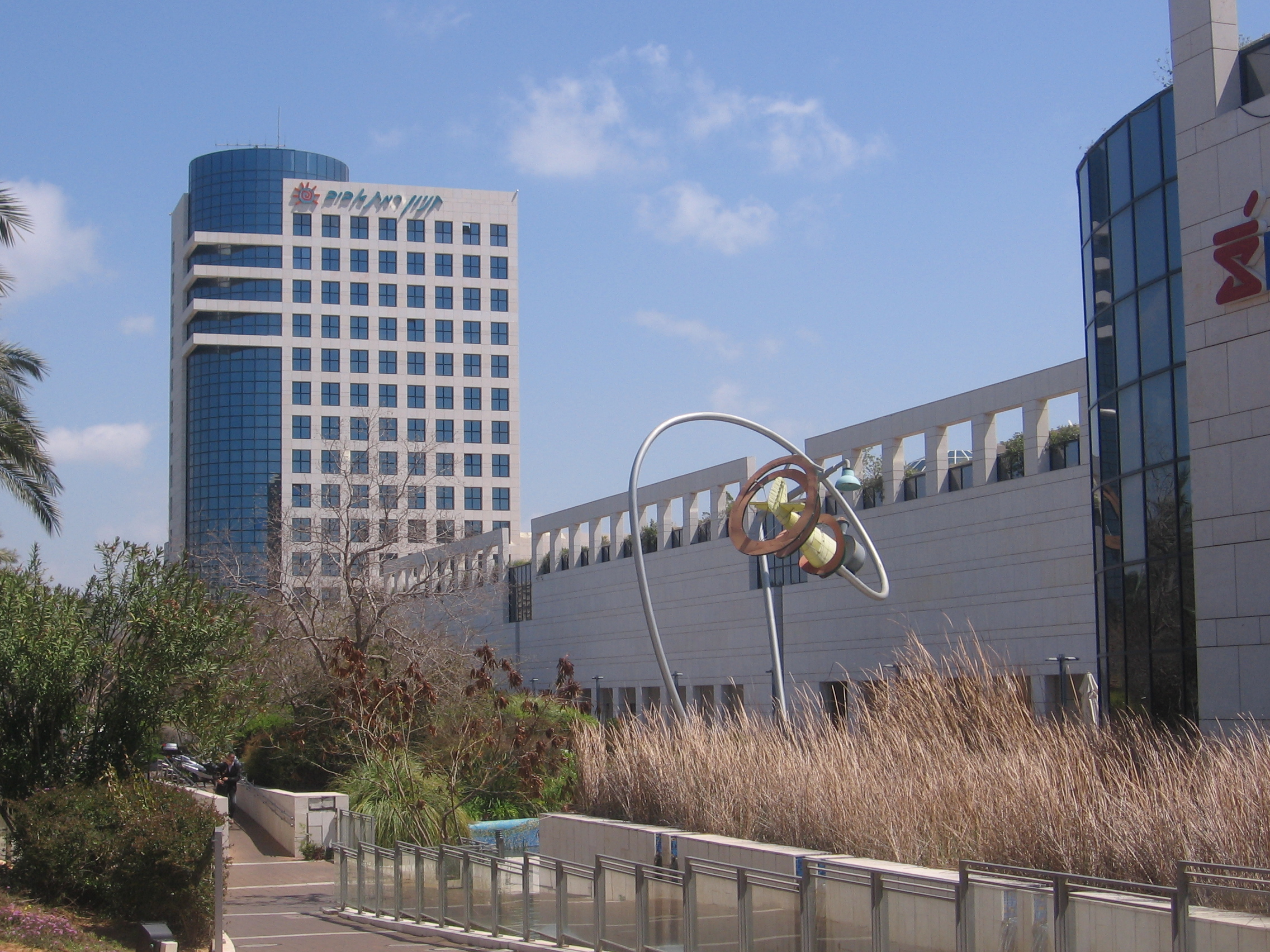
- Ramat Aviv Mall and the office building above i
- Location: Ramat Aviv, Tel Aviv, Israel
- Coordinates: 32°06′44″N 34°47′45″E
- Address: Einstein Street 40
- Opened: September 5, 1997
- Manager: David Ben Moshe
- Owner: Melisron, owned by Ofer Brothers Group (73.4%), Migdal (26.6%)
- Num. of stores: 140
- Num. of anchor tenants: 3
- Floor area: 17,800 square metres (192,000 ft^{2})
- Floors: 2
- Parking: 1550
- Website: www.ramat-aviv-mall.co.il

Ramat Aviv Mall (Hebrew: קניון רמת אביב) is an upscale shopping mall at 40 Einstein Street, in the Ramat Aviv neighborhood of Tel Aviv, Israel. At a rent of $1,804 per square meter, it is Israel's most expensive mall and the 35th most expensive mall in the world. It houses many renowned international fashion brands including Louis Vuitton, Emporio Armani, Montblanc, H. Stern, Michael Kors, Calvin Klein, Tommy Hilfiger, Tumi, Longchamp, Tag heuer, Ralph Lauren, Carolina Herrera, Giorgio Armani, Chanel, Rolex, Nespresso, Hugo Boss and many others. Its gross leasable area is 17,800 square meters (192,000 sq ft) and it has 140 stores in two retail floors. Above the shopping is an office building called Ramat Aviv Mall Tower. The entire project—tower and mall—has a gross area of about 80,900 square meters (871,000 sq ft) The mall is valued at 1.699 billion shekels, or 470 million dollars.

== History ==
The plan to construct the mall was announced in 1989. This plan was met with hostility by the residents of Ramat Aviv, who feared that the mall would damage their quality of life. Betsy Winer, of the Jerusalem Post, wrote, "I was opposed to its [the mall's] construction in the first place, citing it as an ugly, unnecessary eyesore - the product of greedy, rapacious entrepreneurs, and having no place in a residential area." Therefore, in 1992, some 30 residents submitted an appeal to the Supreme Court of Israel to prevent Meqarqee Mercaz Ltd., the company which was going to build the mall, from receiving a license to build a shopping mall in Ramat Aviv. This caused a delay of more than a year in constructing the mall and Meqarqee Mercaz sued the residents, claiming damages of approximately $3–5 million from them. Construction of the mall began on October 11, 1993.

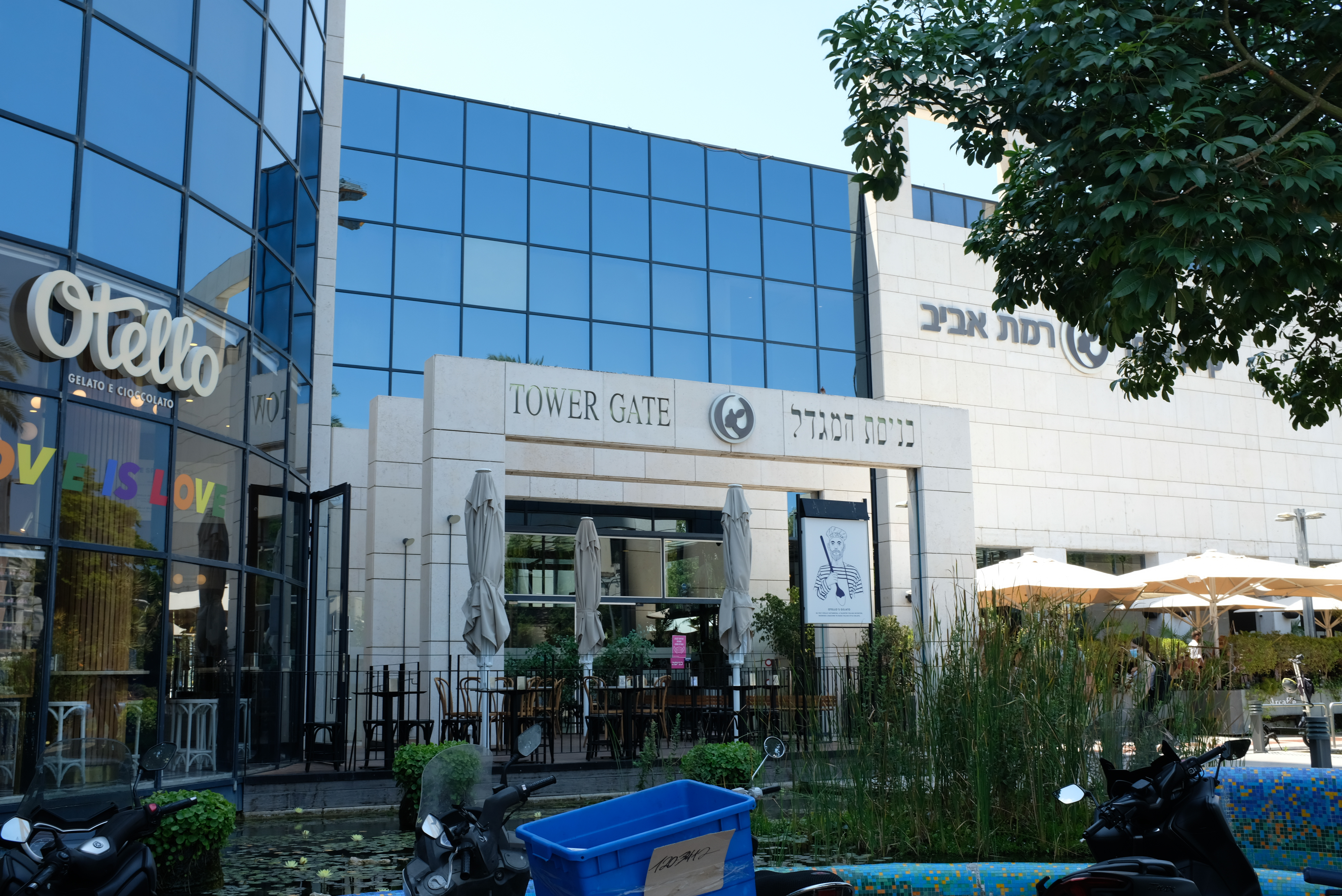
Tower Gate entrance of Ramat Aviv Mall

In November 1996, Lev Leviev, an Orthodox Jewish diamond merchant, became the controlling shareholder of Africa Israel, which owned 74% of Meqarqee Mercaz. Although he first said that "he would not let religious considerations influence the management of the company", in March 1997 he declared that the mall would be closed on Sabbath and he required the restaurants in it to be kosher. This caused a major controversy and led to protests from Omri Padan, head of McDonald's Israel, from Israel Theaters, and from the residents of Ramat Aviv. Padan's and Israel Theaters' contracts allowed them to operate on weekends and the residents claimed that Leviev's decision violated the secular character of their neighborhood. Roni Milo, the mayor of Tel Aviv, even called for a boycott of the shopping mall and Dan Darin, the deputy mayor, stated that the city would not grant Africa Israel new building permits if they were to close the mall on weekends. This caused Africa Israel's stock to drop by 20 percent. On May 7, 1997, Africa Israel decided to allow the McDonald's restaurant in the mall to be non-kosher. The mall and the office building above it opened on September 5, 1997. An arbitrator, Dov Levin, a retired Israeli Supreme Court Justice, was given the right to decide whether or not the cinemas and the restaurants would open on Sabbath. He ruled that they would remain closed because the Tel Aviv bylaws, although rarely enforced, state that entertainment spots and eateries must close on Sabbath. The controversy actually pleased the other store owners, who, because of the mass exposure of the mall, profited more than they expected.

In 2006, the McDonald's branch in the mall became kosher. The decision was initiated by McDonald's itself. In late 2007, the administration of the mall announced that it was going to close down the Lev Cinema. This led to some protests. On its place some stores were built, including the first Apple store in Israel. In April 2009, Africa Israel, which owned 73.4% of the mall, sold its part to Melisron, a company owned by the Ofer Brothers Group, for 1.5 billion shekels. The insurance company Migdal owns the remaining 26.6%.

== Description of the mall ==
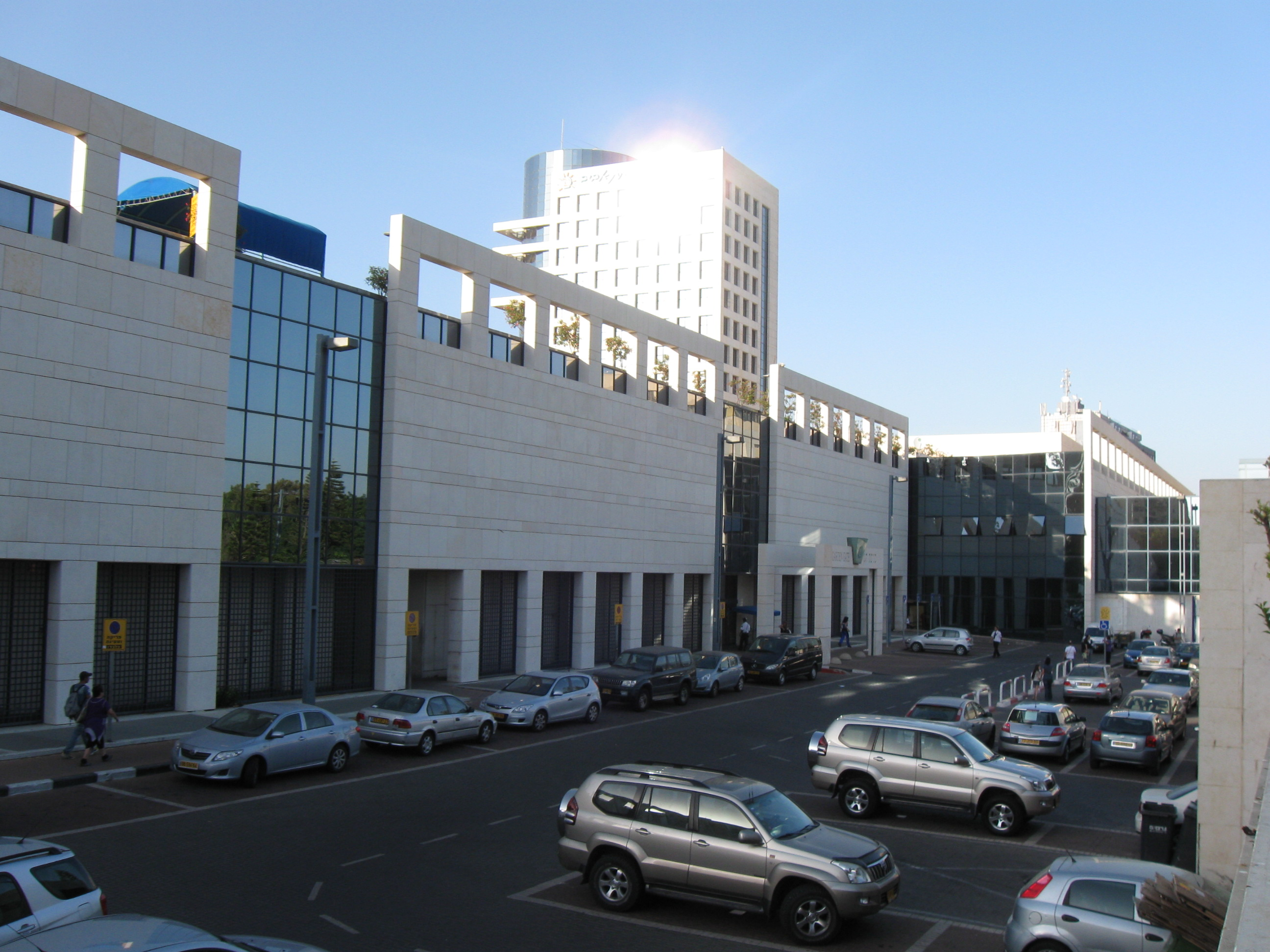
Entrance of the mall through Brazil Street

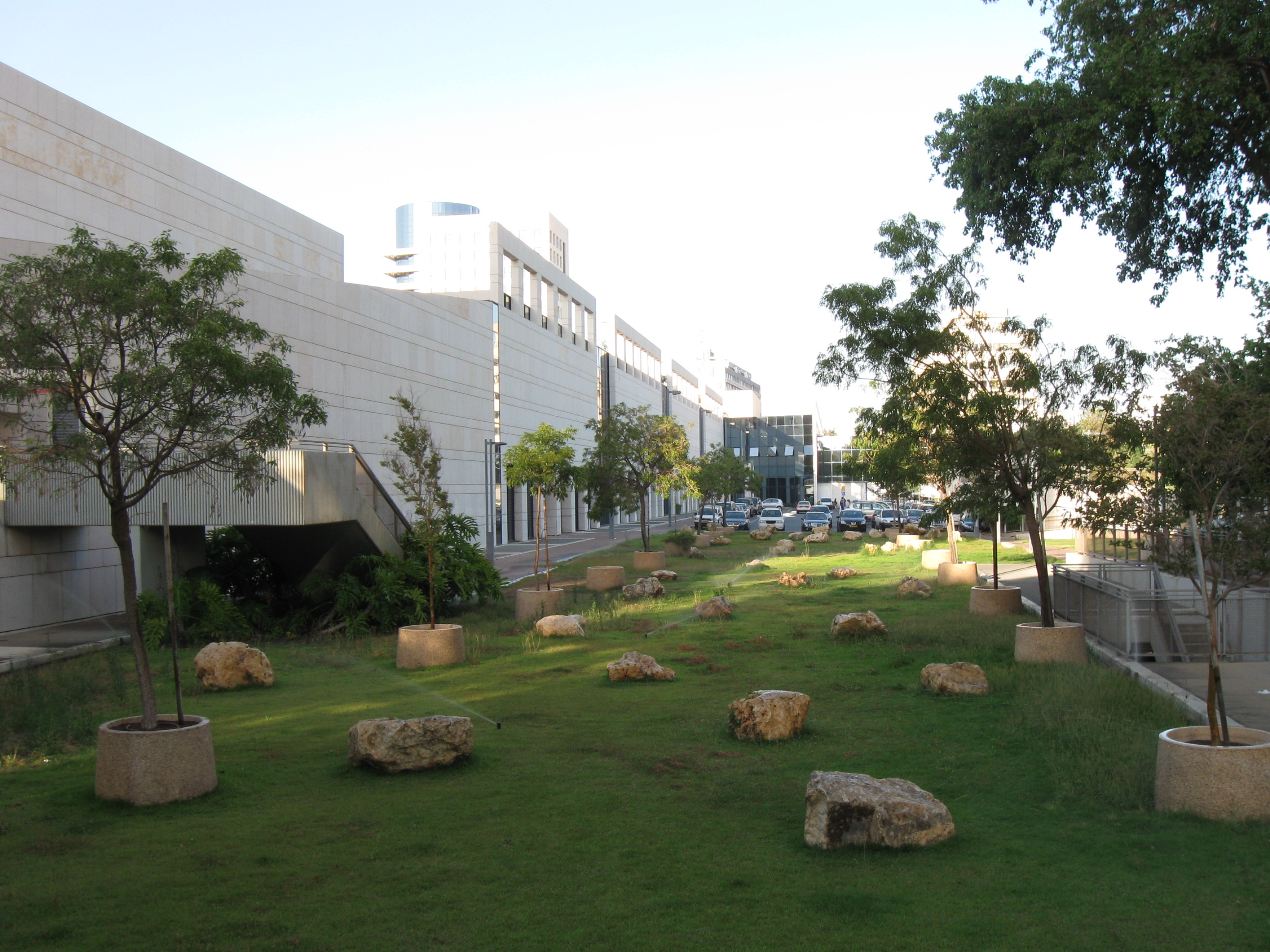
The RocksGarden adjacent to the mall

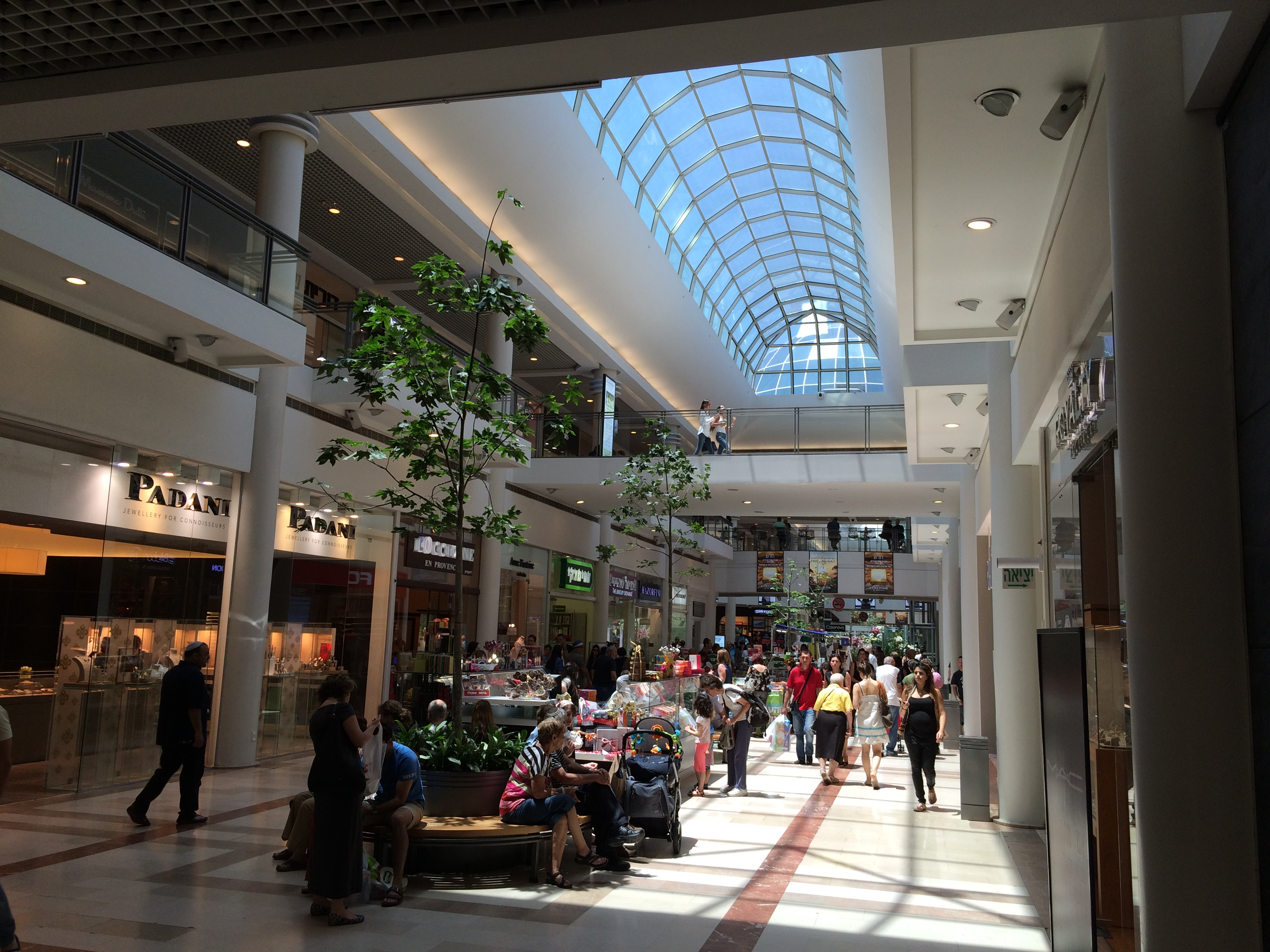
Interior, first floor

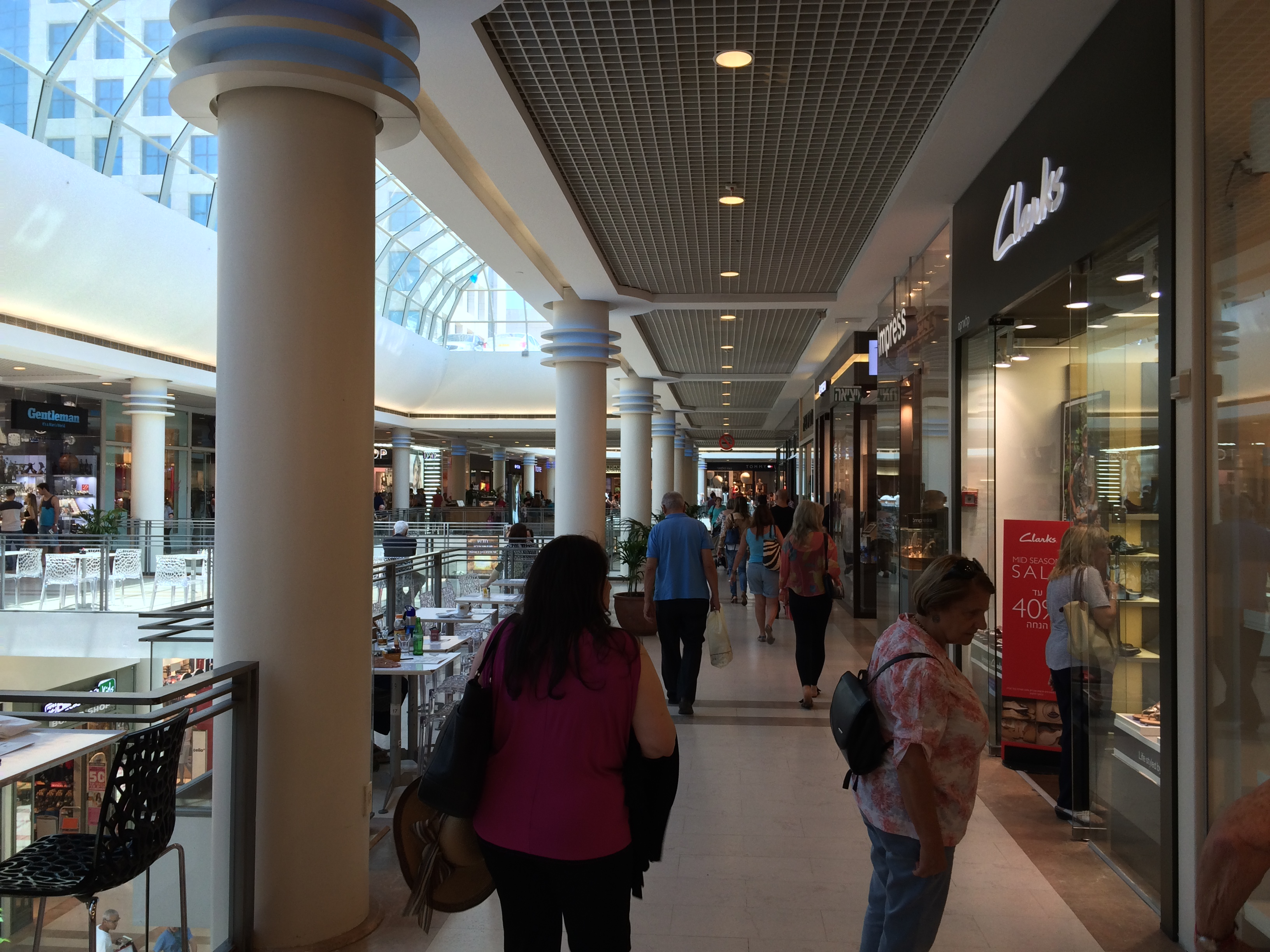
Interior, second floor

Ramat Aviv Mall stretches on an area of 80,876 square meters (870,542 sq ft). This area includes the retail areas, the office areas, the underground and upper parking lots, and the public spaces and parks surrounding the mall. The main entrance of the mall is in Einstein Street 40, and there are two other entrances in Brazil Street and in Brodetsky Street. Approximately 24,000 people visit the mall each day and it is considered one of the most successful shopping malls in Israel, if not the most successful.

About 140 stores operate in the shopping mall. There are a few anchor stores— including Super-Pharm, and Zara and more. The fashion stores Ralph Lauren, Calvin Klein and Lululemon Athletica opened their first stores in Israel in Ramat Aviv Mall. Food companies in the mall include Grand Café, Arcaffe, Café Albert, Mimi Su and McDonald's.

The parking lot contains about 1,550 parking spaces. There are also about 200 parking spaces on the roof of the mall. About 7,200 people use the parking lot each day. Ramat Aviv Mall also has an area of about 7,970 m^{2} (85,788 sq ft) of offices, located primarily in the medical center and in the office building above the mall. The medical center is located on the third floor of the mall and has an area of about 2,100 m^{2} (22,604 sq ft). It includes therapy rooms, surgery rooms and resting rooms. The office building, with 15 floors and a height of 58 meters (190 ft 3 in), comprises an area of about 5,300 m^{2} (57,049 sq ft). The embassies of Norway, Finland, and Croatia are situated in the building, along with law firms.
