= Haifa Center–HaShmona railway station =

Israel Railways passenger station

Coordinates: 32°49′19.82″N 34°59′49.36″E

Haifa Center–HaShmona חיפה מרכז – השמונה
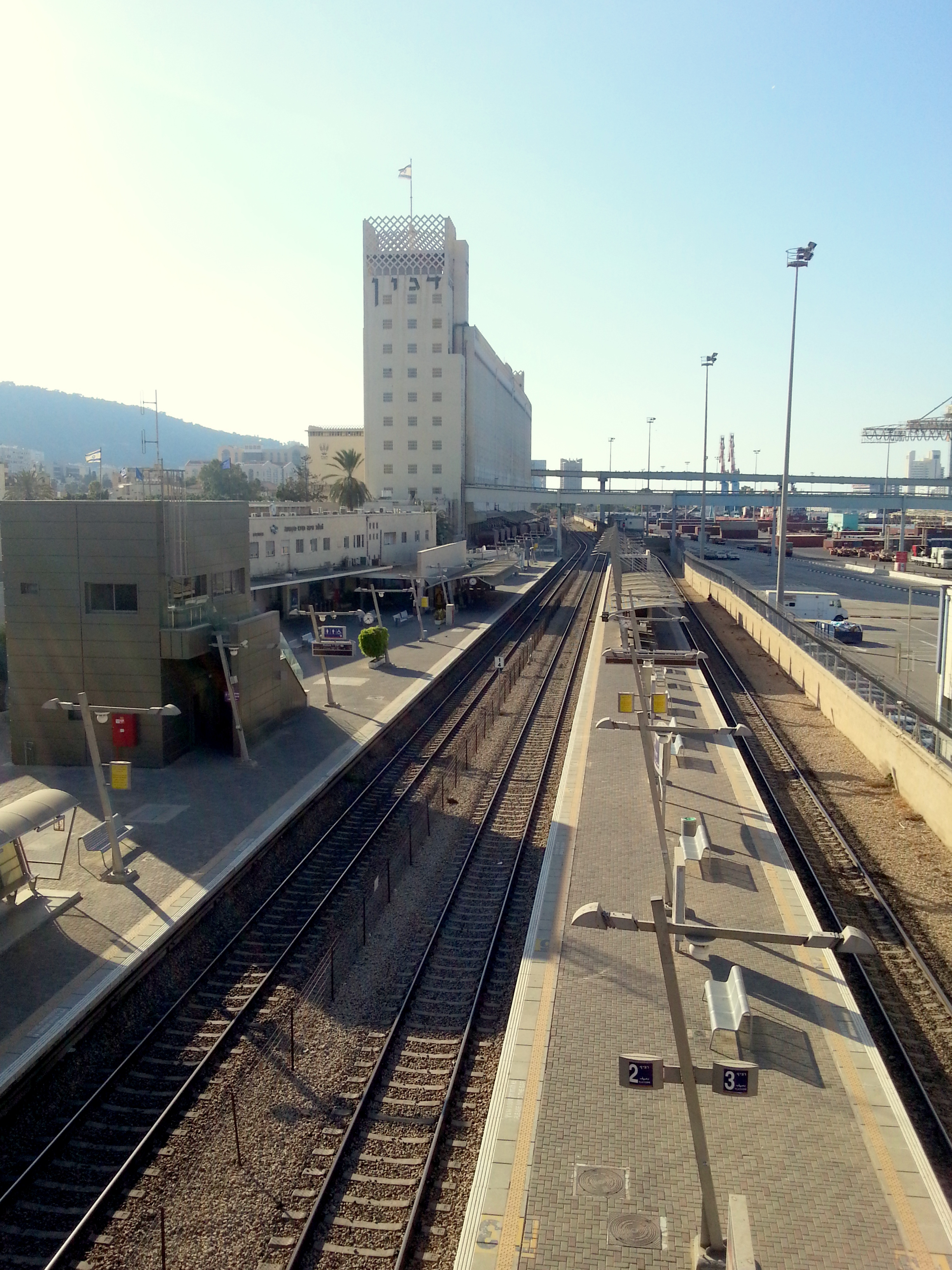
- View of the track and platforms of Haifa Center HaShmona

General information
- Location: 67 Haatzmaut St., Haifa; Israel
- Platforms: 3
- Tracks: 3

Construction
- Parking: 300 free spaces
- Accessible: Yes

History
- Opened: 1937; 89 years ago
- Rebuilt: 2003–2004; 22 years ago

Passengers
- 2019: 2,242,279
- Rank: 22 out of 68
Location

Haifa Center–HaShmona railway station (Hebrew: תחנת הרכבת חיפה מרכז – השמונה, Taḥanat HaRakevet Ḥeifa Merkaz HaShmona, Arabic: محطة حيفا مركز - هشمونه) is an Israel Railways passenger station situated on the coastal railway main line and serves the City of Haifa.

== Location ==
The station is situated on the north–south coastal line and is located on Plumer Square (Hebrew: כיכר פלומר, Kikar Plumer) along Independence Road (Hebrew: דרך העצמאות, Derekh HaAtzma'ut) in Haifa's downtown (or Lower-Town). The station is one of three railway stations serving the city of Haifa directly and also one of six railway stations within Haifa's municipal borders. However, despite ostensibly being the city's central station, it is significantly less busy than Hof HaCarmel station on the city's southwestern outskirts.

== History ==
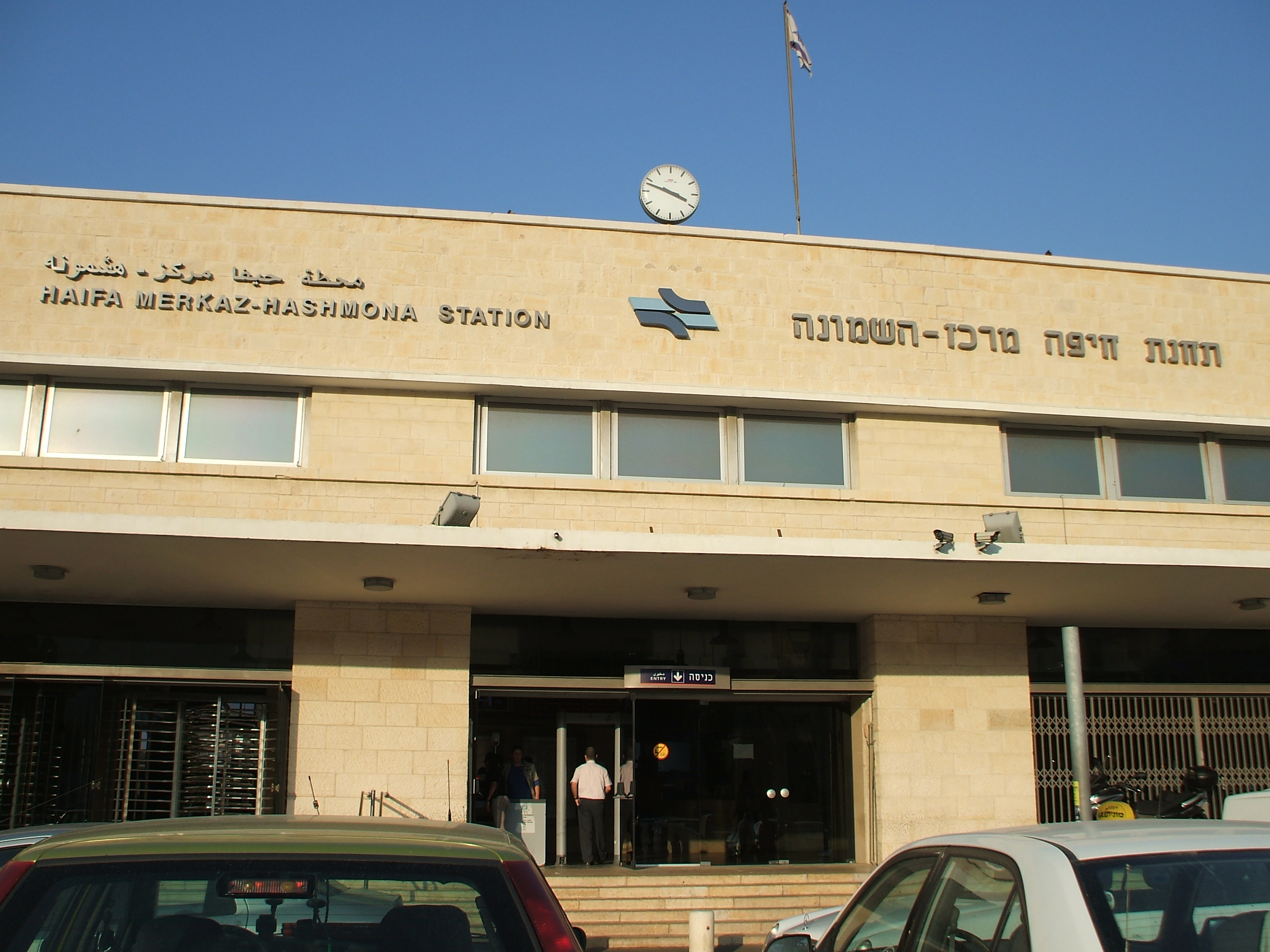
Entrance to Haifa Center HaShmona station

Haifa Center railway station was built by the British during their Mandate for Palestine and was opened in 1937. The station was built on territory reclaimed from the Mediterranean Sea during the construction of Haifa Port in the 1930s. The station building was built in the Bauhaus style and was aligned with the buildings that stood on HaAtzmaut Road (then Kingsway), thus it is not parallel to the rail tracks and platforms at the station.

At first the station was constructed with two side platforms, but over time a third rail track was added along the far-side platform, thus making it an island platform.

Several years later a second story was added to the station building to increase its office capacity (this was possible because the building was designed to have up to four stories).

During the 1950s and 1960s Plumer Square housed one of Haifa's Central Bus Stations, until it was relocated to Haifa Bat Galim Central Bus Station in the 1970s. The adjacent Haifa Bat Galim Train Station, which was built and opened concurrently, replaced Haifa Central as Haifa's de facto central train station (a title it, too, would lose to Hof HaCarmel station in the early 2000s, simultaneously with the replacement of the Bat Galim bus station with the Hof HaCarmel Central Bus Station).

Until 1980 the head office of Israel Railways was located at Haifa Central Station. Tzvi Tzafriry, the general manager of Israel Railways, decided to move the head office to Tel Aviv Savidor Station.

In the years 2003-2004 the station underwent extensive upgrading and renovation. The station has been made accessible for the disabled. The low bridge connecting the two platforms was replaced by a tunnel with elevators (the bridge was too low for the planned overhead electrical lines). During the upgrade both the interior and exterior of the station were renovated and updated to the present passenger station standard of Israel Railways.

During the 2006 Israel-Lebanon conflict train service to the station was suspended after a Hezbollah Katyusha rocket hit a nearby train depot on 16 July 2006, killing eight Israel Railways workers. It was restored 29 days later, on 14 August, two days after the ceasefire went into effect.

On 16 July 2007, one year after the incident, the station was renamed "Haifa Merkaz Hashemona" (Haifa Center of the Eight) to commemorate the eight victims.

On 16 December 2021, National Infrastructure Plan 65-Bet was approved. Under this plan, the station would be relocated underground and renamed Haifa Government District (Hebrew: חיפה קריית הממשלה), while an expanded Hof HaCarmel would become Haifa's official central train station.

== Train service ==
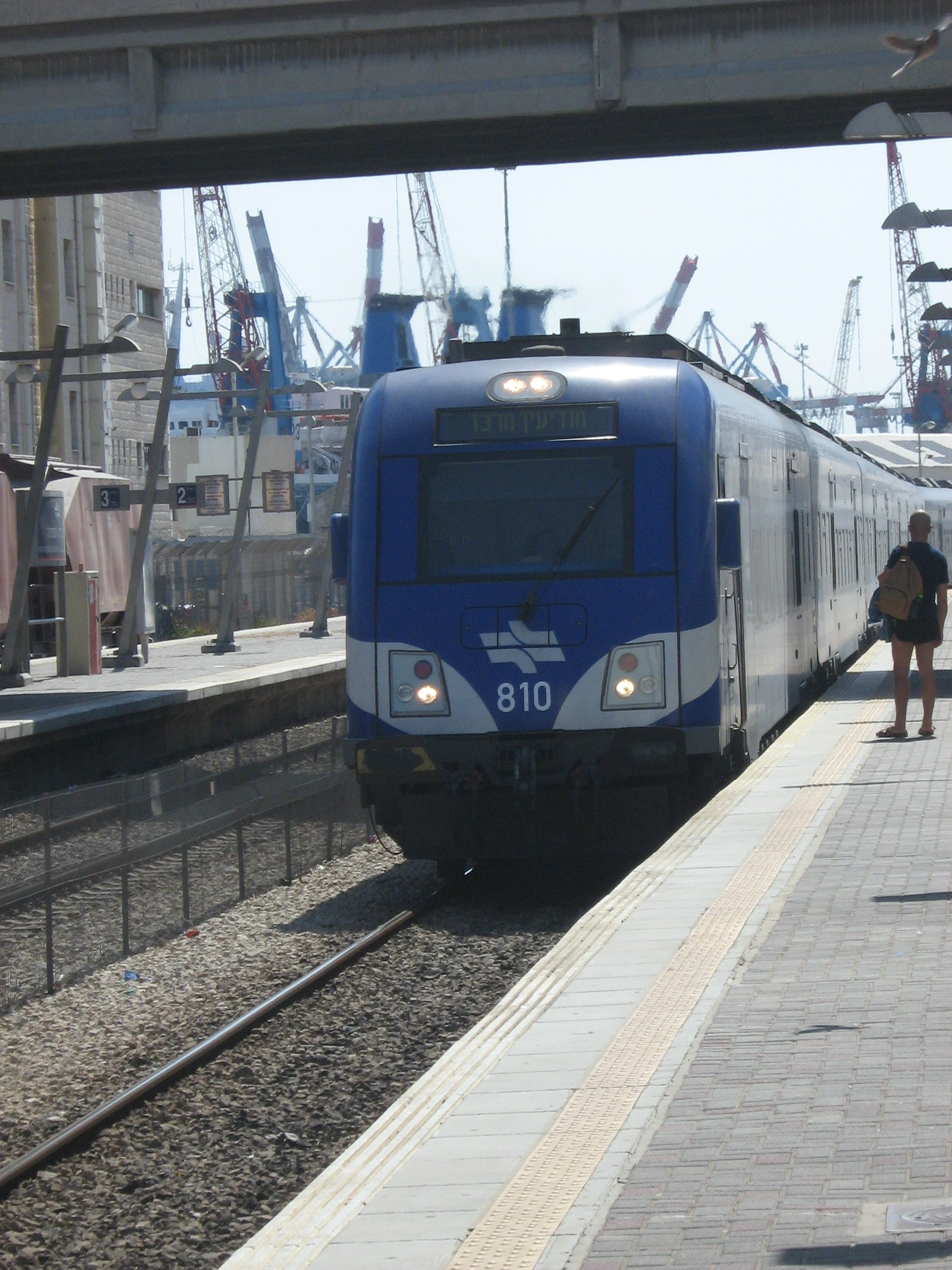
Siemens Viaggio Light DVT at Haifa Center HaShmona

Haifa Center is a station on both the main north–south coastal line of Israel Railways (which serves parts of the Nahariya–Haifa–Tel Aviv–Ben-Gurion Airport–Modi'in, the Nahariya–Haifa–Tel Aviv–Lod–Beersheba, and in the future the Haifa–Tel Aviv–Jerusalem Intercity Lines) and the suburban line serving Haifa's northern suburbs–The Qrayot, Akko (Acre), and Nahariya (Haifa–Akko/Nahariya Suburban Service). It also serves trains operating on the Jezreel Valley railway. The station is situated between Merkazit HaMifratz railway station to the north and Haifa Bat-Galim railway station to the south. Train service at the station is very frequent. For example, on weekdays during peak times (7:00-11:00 and 15:00-20:00) there are four trains per hour to and from Tel Aviv Central with a journey time of about one hour.

- Inter-City Service:
  - On weekdays the station is served by 61 southbound and 62 northbound trains 24 hours a day, with additional trains offered on peak travel days (Sundays and Thursdays).
  - On Fridays and holiday eves the station is served by 21 southbound and 21 northbound trains. The last train departs at 15:59 and the last train arrives at 17:48.
  - On Saturdays and holidays the station is served by 6 southbound and 5 northbound trains. The first train arrives at 22:23 and the first train departs 21:03.
- Suburban Service:
  - On weekdays the station is served by 32 southbound and 35 northbound suburban trains traveling from Haifa to Akko or Nahariya.

Preceding station	Israel Railways	Following station
HaMifratz Central towards Nahariya	Nahariya–Modi'in	Haifa–Bat Galim towards Modi'in–Center
HaMifratz Central towards Nahariya	Nahariya–Beersheba	Haifa–Bat Galim towards Be'er Sheva–Center
HaMifratz Central towards Karmiel	Karmiel–Beersheba	Haifa–Bat Galim towards Be'er Sheva–Center
HaMifratz Central towards Karmiel	Karmiel–Haifa	Haifa–Bat Galim towards Haifa–Hof HaCarmel
HaMifratz Central towards Beit She'an	Beit She'an–Atlit	Haifa–Bat Galim towards Atlit
Kiryat Motzkin towards Nahariya	Night Train Nahariya–Ben Gurion Airport	Haifa–Hof HaCarmel towards Ben Gurion Airport

== Station layout ==
Platform numbers increase in an East-to-West direction

Side platform
Platform 1	Nahariya–Modi'in trains toward Modi'in–Center (Haifa–Bat Galim) → Nahariya–Beersheba and Karmiel–Beersheba trains toward Be'er Sheva–Center (Haifa–Bat Galim) → Karmiel–Haifa trains toward Haifa–Hof HaCarmel (Haifa–Bat Galim) → Beit She'an–Atlit trains toward Atlit (Haifa–Bat Galim) →
Platform 2	← Nahariya–Modi'in and Nahariya–Beersheba trains toward Nahariya (HaMifratz Central) ← Karmiel–Beersheba and Karmiel–Haifa trains toward Karmiel (HaMifratz Central) ← Beit She'an–Atlit trains toward Beit She'an–David Levy (HaMifratz Central)
Island platform
Platform 3	← Termination track – not in ordinary use →

== Ridership ==
Passengers boarding and disembarking by year
Year	Passengers	Rank	Source
2021	1,066,835 (▲292,973)	23 of 66 (▼1)	2021 Freedom of Information Law Annual Report
2020	773,862 (▼1,468,417)	22 of 68	2020 Freedom of Information Law Annual Report
2019	2,242,279	22 of 68	2019 Freedom of Information Law Annual Report

== Public transport connections ==
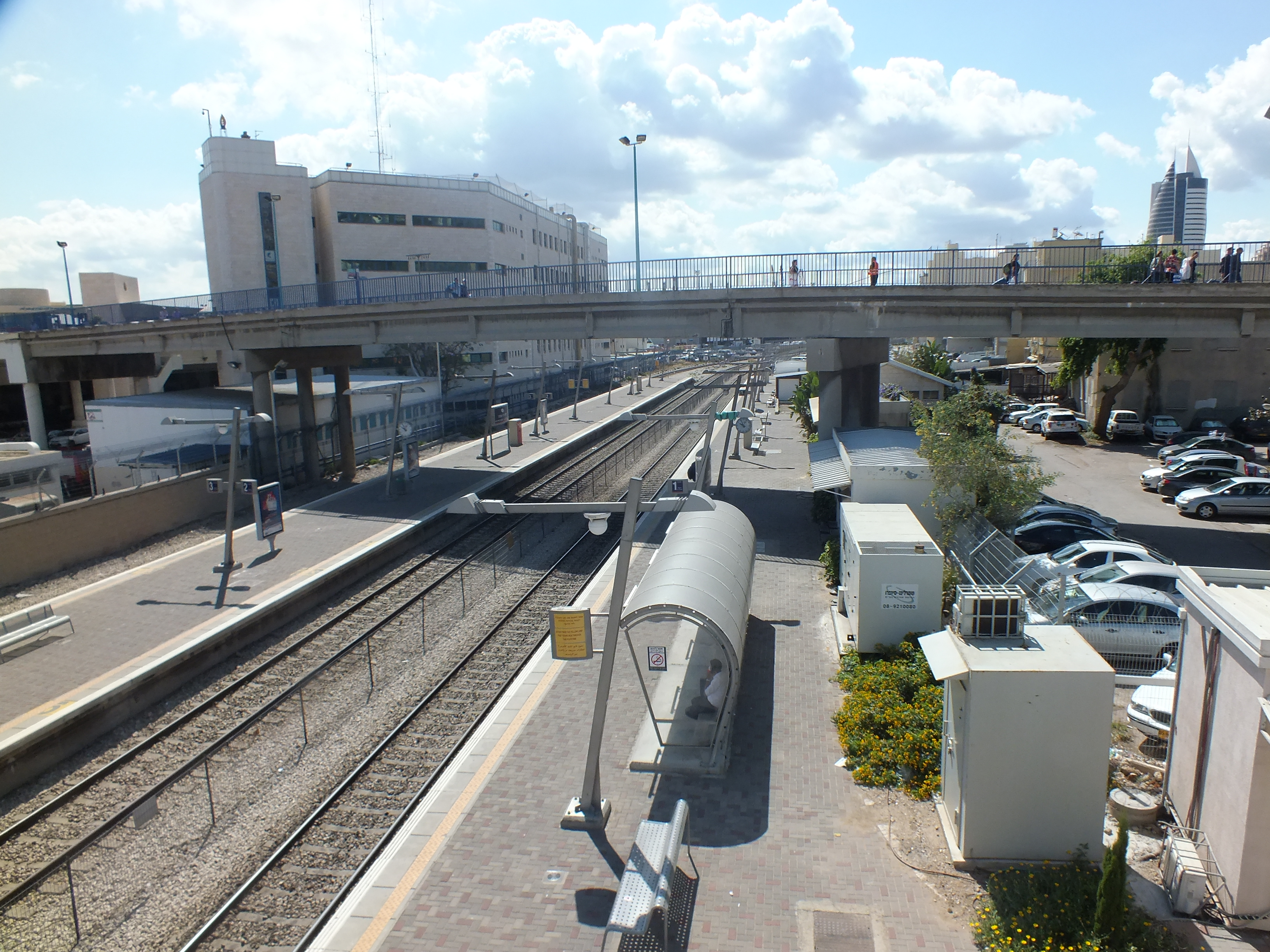
Pedestrians on the bridge connecting the port of Haifa's passenger terminal with Ha'Atzma'ut Road and Haifa Center railway station.

Haifa Center Railway Station is located next to HaAtzmaut Road, a major public transport artery, thus easily accessible from both bus and Sherut Taxi (share taxi). Bus lines include:

- Metronit line 1: Haifa Hof HaCarmel Central Bus Station–Krayot Central Bus Station via Down-Town and Mifratz Central Bus Station.
- Metronit line 2: Bat Galim Railway Station–Kiryat Ata via Down-Town and Mifratz Central Bus Station.
- 14: Bat Galim neighborhood (Circular) (Operated on Saturdays only).
- 17: Carmel Beach CBS–Technion.
- 18: Bat Galim railway station–Neve Sha'anan neighborhood.
- 19/19א: Bat Galim neighborhood–Technion (Evenings and nights only).
- 36: Bat Galim railway station–University
- 200: Haifa Bay CBS - Dado Beach (Nights only).
- 205: Haifa Central railway station–Tirat Carmel (Weekend nights only).
- 236: Haifa Central railway station–Central Carmel.
- 331 and 332: Suburban lines to Nazareth.

The station is also within a short walking distance from the Port of Haifa's passenger terminal and is near Kikar Pariz (Hebrew: כיכר פריז, Paris Square) – a Carmelit (Haifa's subway) station.

== Facilities ==
- Payphone
- Ticket cashier
- Ticket machine
- Buffet
- Parking lot
- Toilet
- Taxi station
