= Haifa–Bat Galim railway station =

Railway station in Haifa, Israel

Coordinates: 32°49′50″N 34°58′54″E

Haifa–Bat Galim חיפה – בת גלים
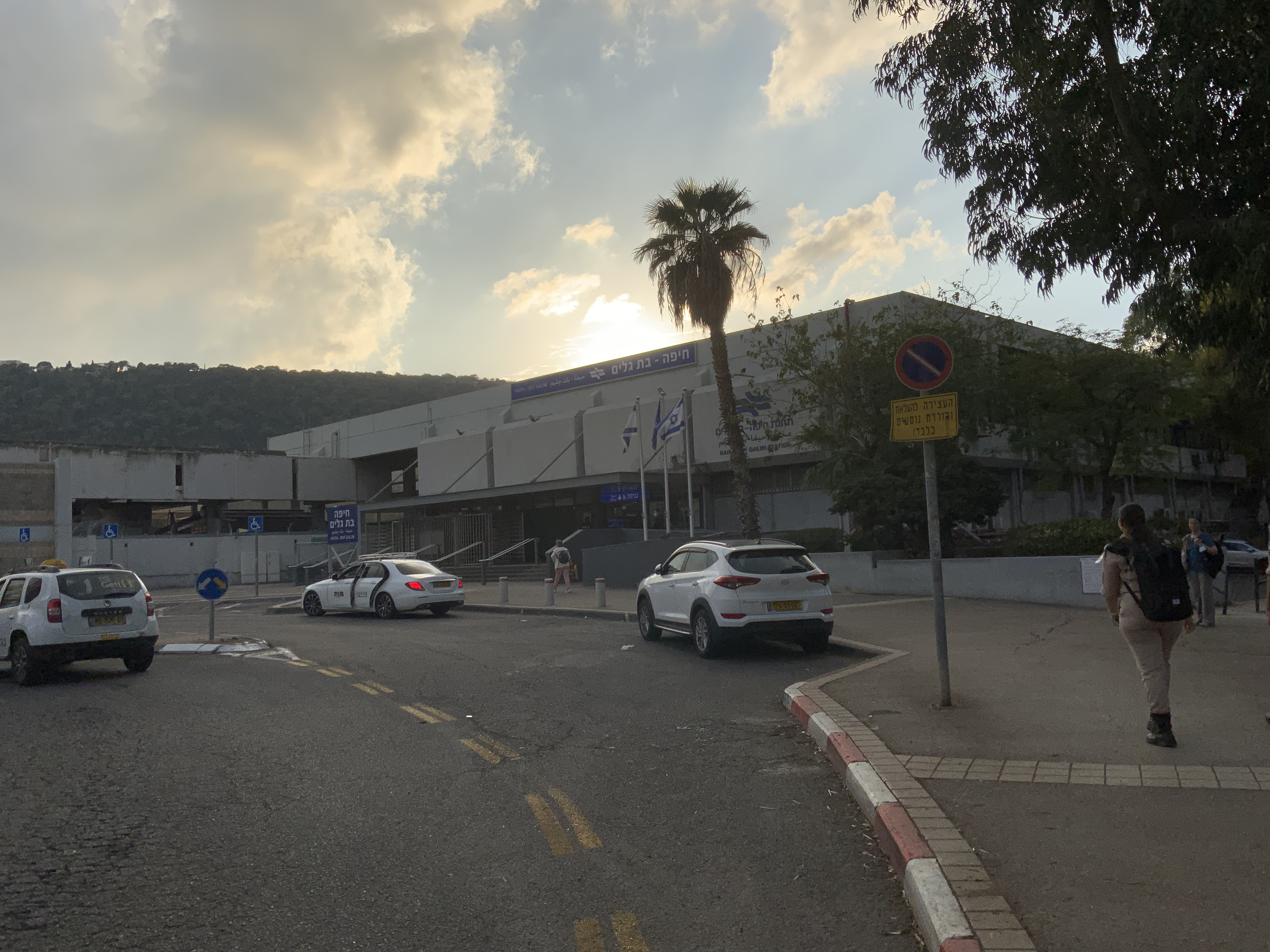
- Bat Galim railway station entrance

General information
- Location: HaHagana Ave., Haifa; Israel
- Platforms: 2
- Tracks: 3

Construction
- Parking: 250 free spaces
- Accessible: No

History
- Opened: 1975; 51 years ago

Passengers
- 2019: 2,282,213
- Rank: 21 out of 68
Location

Haifa–Bat Galim railway station (Hebrew: תחנת הרכבת חיפה – בת גלים, Taḥanat HaRakevet Ḥeifa Bat Gailm) is an Israel Railways passenger station situated on the coastal railway line and serves the city of Haifa. The station takes its name from the neighborhood of Bat Galim, where it is located. The station was Haifa's main train station from its construction in 1975 until the early 2000s.

== Location ==
The station is situated on the North-South coastal line and is located in on the southern edges of Bat Galim neighborhood. It is adjacent to the Haifa Bat Galim Central Bus Station and within walking distance of the eastern end of the Haifa Port and the Rambam Health Care Campus. The station is one of three railway stations serving the city of Haifa directly and one of six railway stations within Haifa's municipal borders.

== History ==
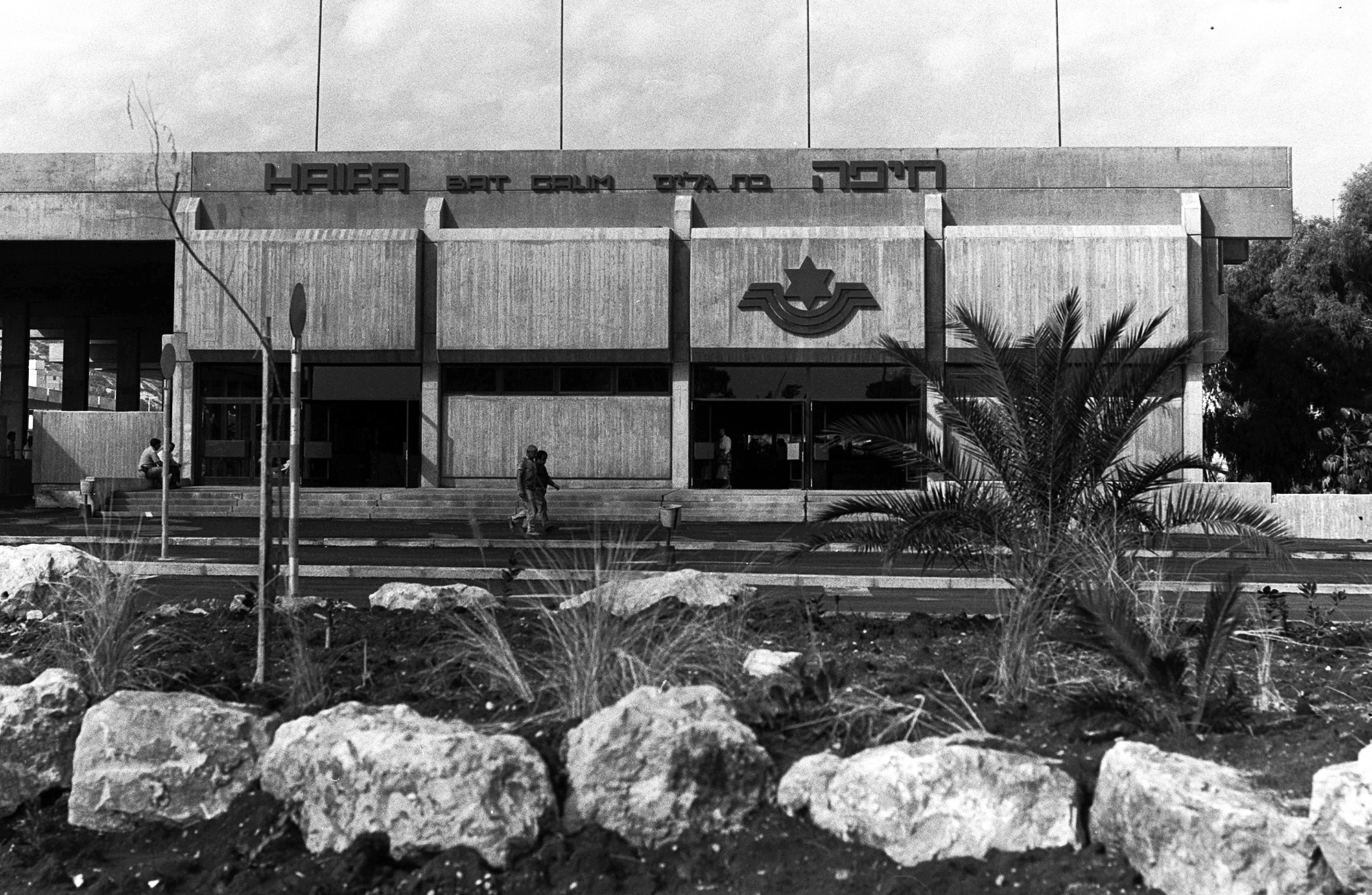
Bat Galim train station in 1975.

Haifa Bat Galim station was built in 1975, along with Haifa Bat Galim Central Bus Station as part of a large public transport center between the main highway which runs through the city (Highway 4) and the Bat Galim neighborhood. The station soon became Haifa's main railway station, largely thanks to its vicinity to the central bus station.

The station was constructed with a fairly large station hall, two side platforms and three parallel rail tracks (the middle one used for freight trains bypassing passenger trains stopped at the station). The station also has a pedestrian tunnel connection the two platforms and extending to the central bus station and then to the other side of HaHagana Boulevard (some 220 m).

During the late 1990s the Haifa - Kiryat Motzkin Suburban Service was established and Haifa Bat Galim station was its southern terminus. In order to accommodate the suburban trains a new short bay platform named '1A' was built. With the construction of Hof HaCarmel railway station, which replaced Haifa Bat Galim station as the southern terminus, platform 1A became unused.

In the early 2000s the station was updated to the present passenger station format of Israel Railways and was superficially renovated, leaving much of the 30-year-old wear-and-tear in place.

The station's decline, as did its ascent, is attributed to the adjacent central bus station. In a plan to ease traffic congestion in downtown Haifa most of the regular bus traffic was rerouted so that it starts and ends at the newly constructed central bus stations at the outskirts of the city (northbound buses terminate at Mifratz Central Bus Station as of January 1, 2001 and southbound buses terminate at the Haifa Hof HaCarmel Central Bus Station as of fall 2003). This plan made the Haifa Bat Galim Central Bus Station virtually deserted, with only a few city bus lines passing through it. The sharp decline in passenger number at the central bus station greatly affected passenger traffic at Haifa Bat Galim station as well, making it a large station with very few passengers.

During the 2006 Israel-Lebanon conflict train service to the station was suspended after a Hezbollah Katyusha rocket hit a train depot in Haifa on July 16, 2006, killing eight Israel Railways workers. It was restored 29 days later, on August 14, two days after the ceasefire went into effect.

On December 16, 2021, National Infrastructure Plan 65-Bet was approved. Under this plan, the station would be relocated underground and renamed Haifa Bat Galim-Kiryat Eliezer (Hebrew: חיפה בת גלים-קריית אליעזר).

== Train service ==
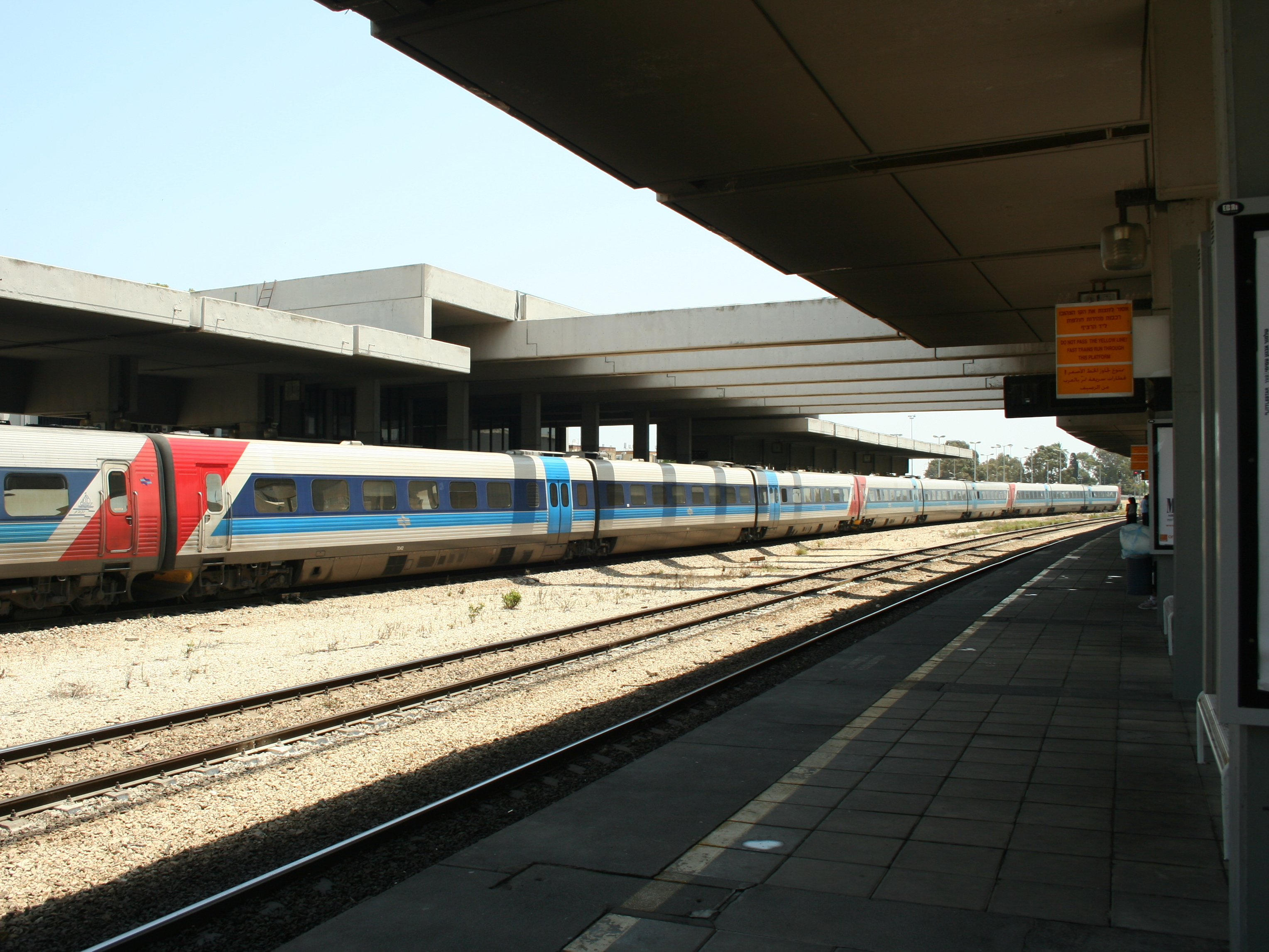
Inside view from the west

Haifa Bat Galim is a station on both the main north–south coastal line of Israel Railways (Nahariya–Haifa–Tel-Aviv–Ben-Gurion Airport Inter-City Service) and the suburban line serving Haifa's northern suburbs – the Krayot (Haifa–Kiryat Motzkin Suburban Service). The station is situated between Haifa Center Railway Station to the north and Hof HaCarmel railway station to the south.

- Inter-City Service:
  - On weekdays the station is served by 40 southbound and 44 northbound trains. First train departs at 04:58 and last train arrives at 00:52.
  - On Fridays and holiday eves the station is served by 19 southbound and 19 northbound trains. First train departs at 05:01 and last train arrives at 15:38.
  - On Saturdays and holidays the station is served by 6 southbound and 5 northbound trains. First train departs at 18:50 and last train arrives at 22:16.
- Suburban Service:
  - On weekdays the station is served by 14 southbound and 12 northbound suburban trains to and from the Krayot. First train departs at 07:00 and last train arrives at 19:07.

| Preceding station | Israel Railways | Following station |
|---|---|---|
| Haifa Center–HaShmona towards Nahariya | Nahariya–Modi'in | Haifa–Hof HaCarmel towards Modi'in–Center |
| Haifa Center–HaShmona towards Nahariya | Nahariya–Beersheba | Haifa–Hof HaCarmel towards Be'er Sheva–Center |
| Haifa Center–HaShmona towards Karmiel | Karmiel–Beersheba | Haifa–Hof HaCarmel towards Be'er Sheva–Center |
| Haifa Center–HaShmona towards Karmiel | Karmiel–Haifa | Haifa–Hof HaCarmel Terminus |
| Haifa Center–HaShmona towards Beit She'an | Beit She'an–Atlit | Haifa–Hof HaCarmel towards Atlit |

== Station layout ==
Platform numbers increase in a West-to-East direction

Side platform
| Platform 1 | Nahariya–Modi'in and Nahariya–Beersheba trains toward Nahariya (Haifa Center–HaShmona) → Karmiel–Beersheba and Karmiel–Haifa trains toward Karmiel (Haifa Center–HaShmona) → Beit She'an–Atlit trains toward Beit She'an–David Levy (Haifa Center–HaShmona) → |
| Platform 2 | ← Nahariya–Modi'in trains toward Modi'in–Center (Haifa–Hof HaCarmel) ← Nahariya–Beersheba and Karmiel–Beersheba trains toward Be'er Sheva–Center (Haifa–Hof HaCarmel) ← Karmiel–Haifa trains toward Haifa–Hof HaCarmel (terminus) ← Beit She'an–Atlit trains toward Atlit (Haifa–Hof HaCarmel) |
Side platform

== Ridership ==
Passengers boarding and disembarking by year
| Year | Passengers | Rank | Source |
|---|---|---|---|
| 2021 | 1,480,565 (▲605,646) | 15 of 66 (▲4) | 2021 Freedom of Information Law Annual Report |
| 2020 | 874,919 (▼1,407,294) | 19 of 68 (▲2) | 2020 Freedom of Information Law Annual Report |
| 2019 | 2,282,213 | 21 of 68 | 2019 Freedom of Information Law Annual Report |

== Public transport connections ==
Haifa Bat Galim station is adjacent to Haifa Bat Galim Central Bus Station, and is connected to it via a pedestrian tunnel. Although the central bus station has ceased to be Haifa's main central bus station, it is still served by some 14 city bus lines and is fairly easily accessible from any part of the city.

Line 2 of the Metronit, Haifa's Phileas-based bus rapid transport system, terminates outside Bat Galim.
