= Central Bus Station =

Central Bus Station can refer to:

- Cardiff Central bus station
- Haifa Bat Galim Central Bus Station
- Haifa Hof HaCarmel Central Bus Station
- HaMifratz Central Bus Station
- Jerusalem Central Bus Station
- Kiryat Malakhi Central Bus Station
- Montreal Central Bus Station
- Ottawa Central Bus Station
- Petah Tikva Central Bus Station
- Central Bus Station Sofia
- Tel Aviv Central Bus Station
- Central Bus Station, Tiruchirappalli
- Central Bus Station Thiruvananthapuram
- Carmel Beach Central Bus Station
- Kyiv Central Bus Station
- Hamburg Central Bus Station
- Bratislava Central Bus Station
- Zentraler Omnibusbahnhof München
- Heathrow Central bus station
