= Metronit =

Israeli transport company

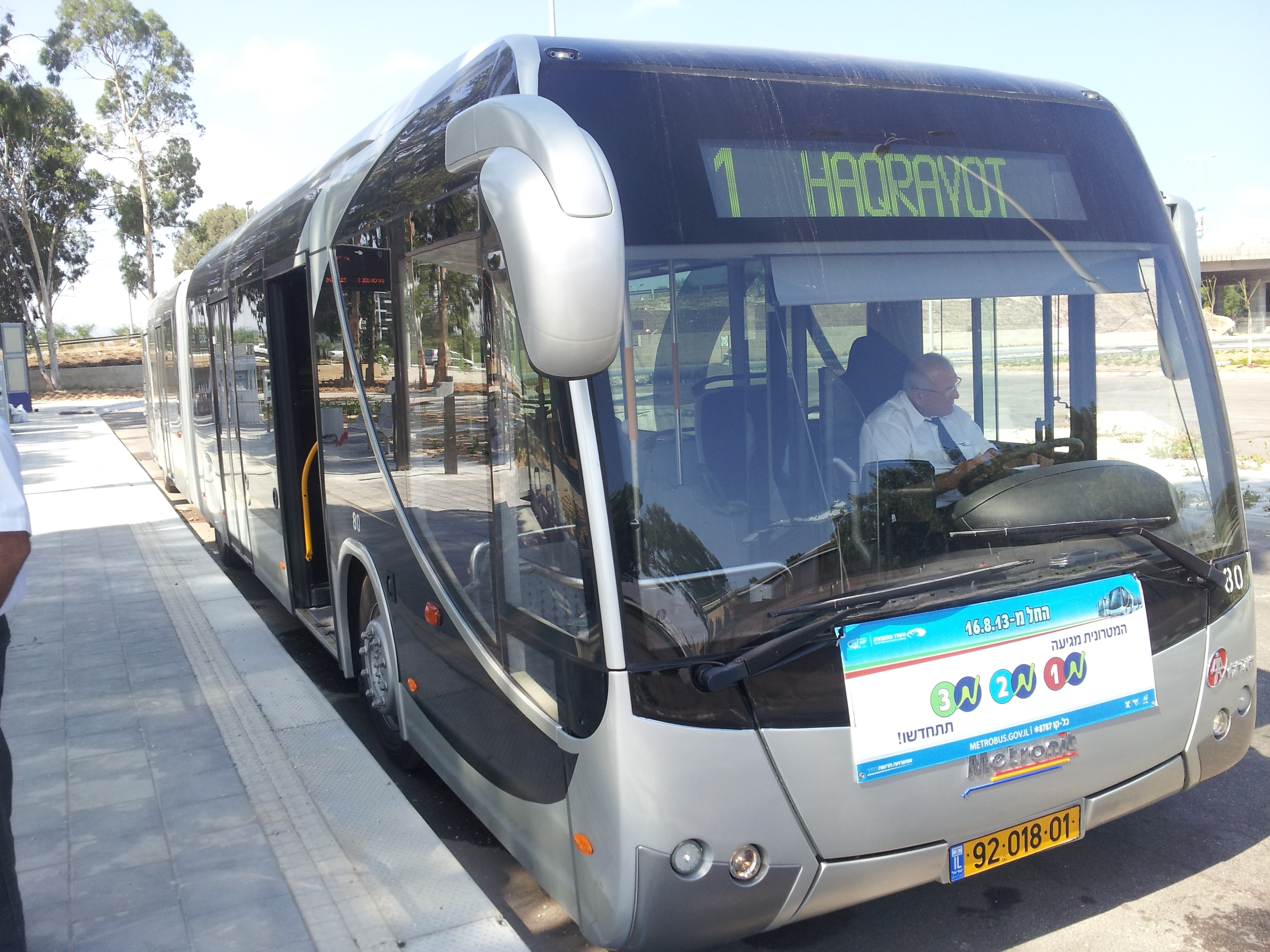

Overview
- Native name: מטרונית, مترونيت
- Locale: Haifa and the Krayot
- Transit type: Bus rapid transit
- Number of lines: 5
- Number of stations: 152
- Daily ridership: 92,000 (May 2015)
- Annual ridership: 30 million (2014–2015 year)
- Website: http://www.metronit.co.il

Operation
- Began operation: August 2013
- Operator(s): Dan North (2013–2021), Superbus (2021–current)
- Number of vehicles: 120

Technical
- System length: 60 km (37 mi)

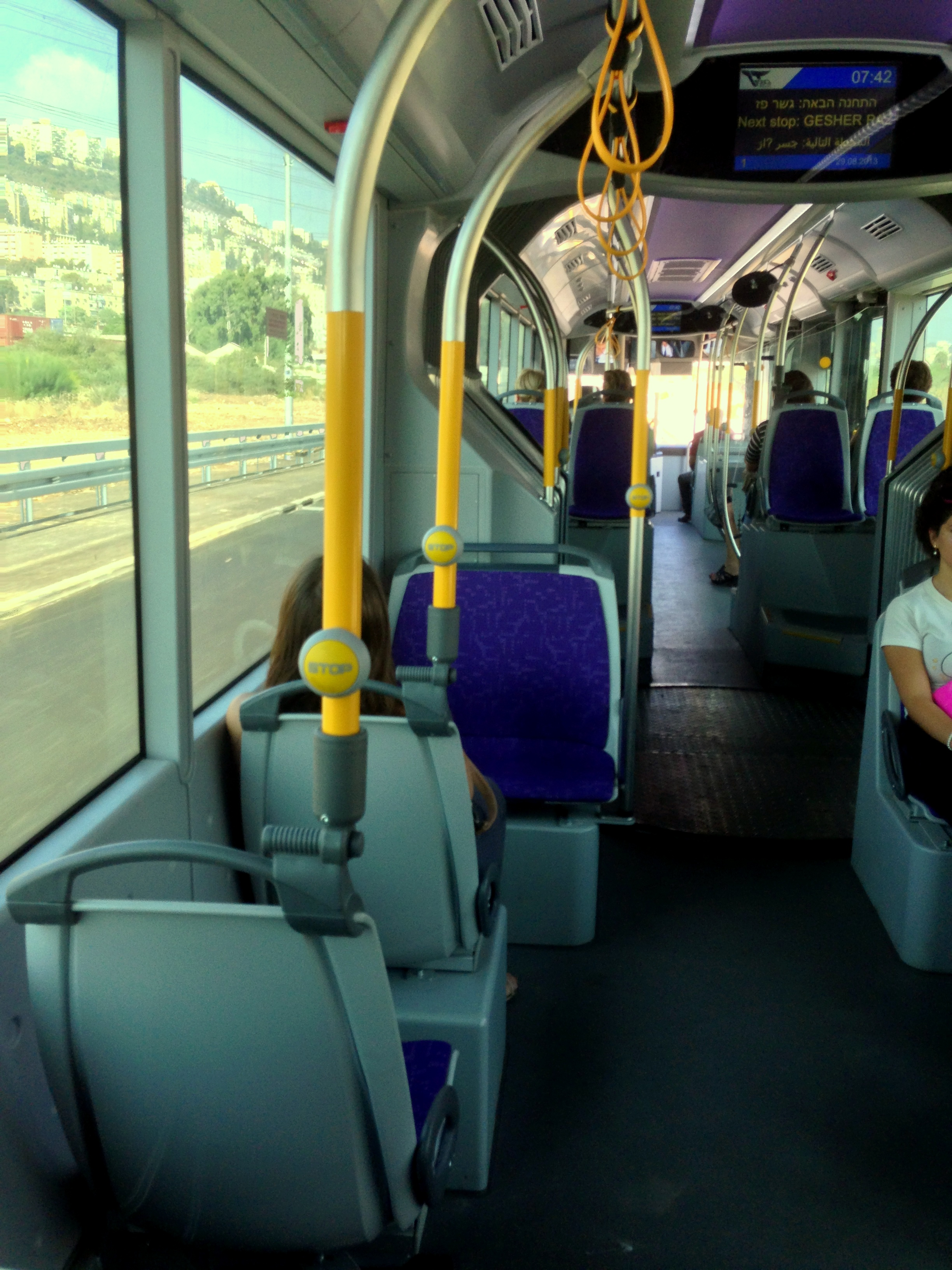
Inside the old Metronit

The Metronit (Hebrew: מטרונית, Arabic: مترونيت), also spelled Matronit, is a bus rapid transit (BRT) system in Haifa, Israel.

Two Metronit lines, 1 and 5א, operate during the weekend, or Sabbath, i.e. on Friday night and Saturday, which is almost unique in Israel – as of 2022, only in a handful of cities in Israel, Haifa among them, do public buses also offer service on Sabbath.

== Overview ==
=== Name ===
The name, Metronit, was among some 500 suggestions submitted by the public in a prize-winning competition. Metronit was chosen for several reasons. The name itself was deemed to be easily expressed, catchy and unique. The Hebrew word, "Matronit" - meaning "respectable woman" or "lady" in Hebrew - was felt to convey a feeling of elegance and respectability. The prefix "Metro-" implies an efficient metropolitan rapid transportation system; the suffix "-it" aligns with Haifa's existing Carmelit funicular subway, the Rakvalit cable cars, and the Shkhunatit internal neighbourhood minibus system.

=== Vehicles ===
The Metronit consists of 120 18.75-meter long high-capacity buses on three routes, with a capacity of 120-140 passengers per bus. Some of the buses operate with hybrid engines (six Phileas buses manufactured by APTS) and are currently being evaluated for more widespread use. The rest of the buses are conventional MAN Lion's City GL Diesel powered buses. The network is a total of 60 km (37 mi) in length - of which 40 km (25 mi) are dedicated roadways.

The Metronit is unique in Israel in that it uses bi-articulated buses on specific routes. The choice of this mode of transport was due to the advantage of limited damage to the environment during construction, increased capacity on existing roads, and reduced operating costs compared to a standard bus or light rail line.

=== Construction ===
The Metronit project was developed by Yefe Nof, a company owned by the City of Haifa which is involved in planning public transportation, infrastructure, and other building projects in the Haifa metropolitan area. A tender for its operation was published in September 2009 with the original intention that the system be completed by Fall 2012. On August 4, 2010, it was announced that Dan won the tender to operate the system for 12 years. The cost of the system is estimated at 1.5 billion NIS (approximately $400 million US).

=== Commencement of operations ===
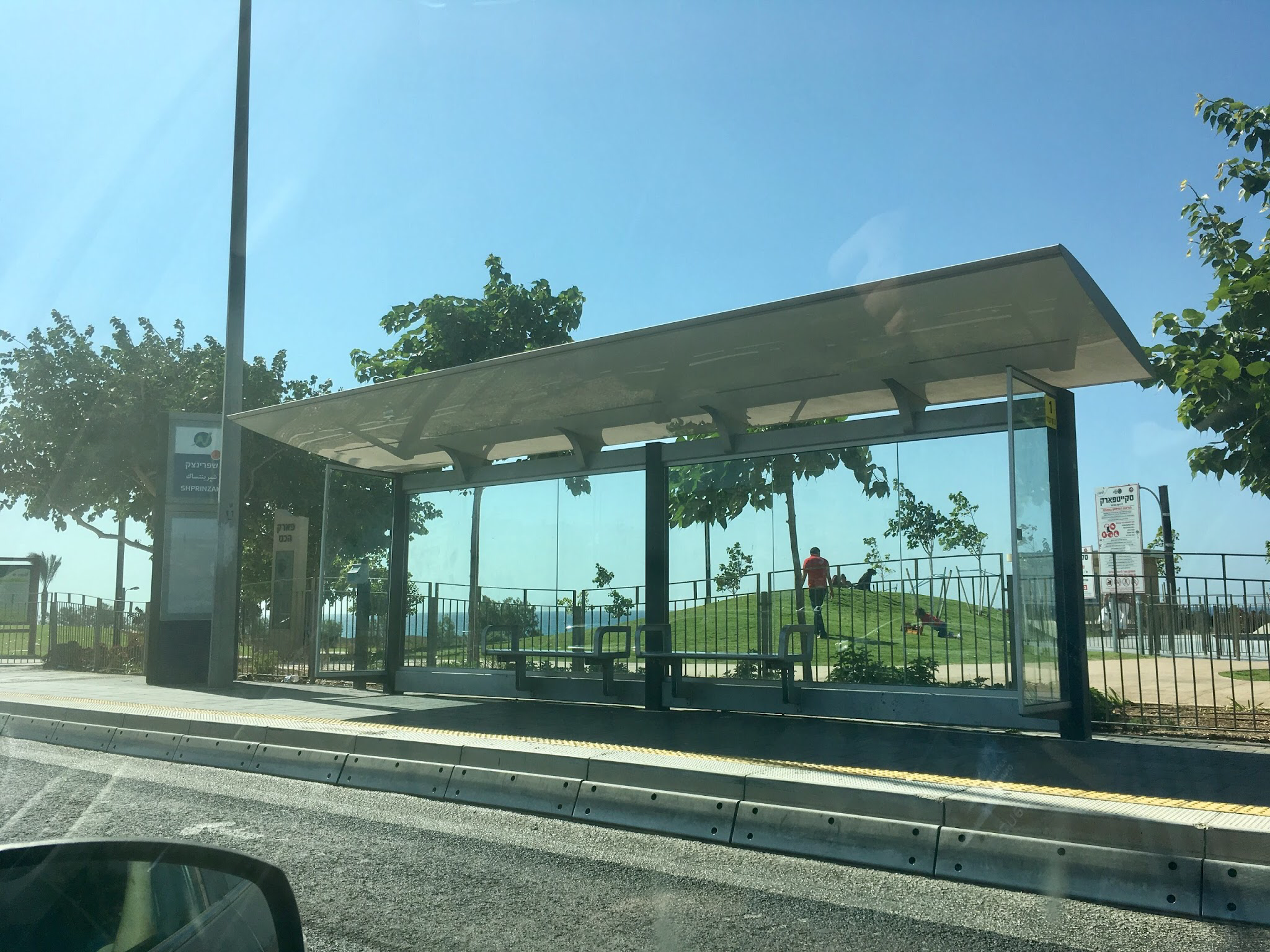
Metronit station in Sprinzak neighborhood

The Metronit began testing on August 2, 2013, and passenger operations commenced on August 16, 2013. As the first BRT system in Israel, there were initially many operational problems, caused mainly by a lack of priority at traffic lights, insufficient bus drivers and more passengers than anticipated. To promote the service, there was initially a period of free ridership that ended on December 23, 2013.

In May 2015, the daily ridership on the Metronit was 92,000 – with a total of 30 million passengers using the system in the first year.

In October 2021, Superbus took over operations of Metronit from Dan North.

== Lines ==
There are currently five Metronit lines. The first operates from the Krayot Central Bus Station to Hof HaCarmel. The second from Kiryat Ata to Bat Galim. The third from Krayot Central Bus Station to Hadar HaCarmel. The fourth operates like the first line, but runs via the Carmel Tunnels instead of HaHagana boulevard unlike the first line. And the fifth operates from Yagur to Hadar HaCarmel, on weekends, a different route labeled 5א operates to Bat Galim instead.

Line	Length	Towns served	Route description	Number of stations	Frequency	Approx. journey time (end to end)	Average speed
Red Line (Line 1)	25 km (16 mi)	Kiryat Motzkin, Haifa	From Krayot Central (in north Kiryat Motzkin), via Route 4, Histradrut Way, HaMifratz Central, and Downtown Haifa to Hof HaCarmel	38	Every 4–8 minutes (06:00–20:00), every 10–20 minutes (20:00–05:00 and on Shabbat). Operates 24/7.	65 minutes	23.1 km/h (14.4 mph)
Blue Line (Line 2)	18 km (11 mi)	Kiryat Ata, Haifa	From Kiryat Ata to Bat Galim via Route 4, Histradrut Way, HaMifratz Central, and Downtown Haifa	33	Every 6–10 minutes (peak hours), every 12–30 minutes (off-peak) (no night or Shabbat service)	52 minutes	20.8 km/h (12.9 mph)
Green Line (Line 3)	16 km (9.9 mi)	Kiryat Yam, Kiryat Haim, Kiryat Shmuel, Haifa	From Krayot Central, via Kiryat Yam, Kiryat Haim, Kiryat Shmuel, Histradrut Way, HaMifratz Central to HaNev'im Street in Hadar HaCarmel	30	Every 10 minutes (peak hours), every 12–60 (off-peak) (no night or Shabbat service)	50 minutes	19.2 km/h (11.9 mph)
Purple Line (Line 4)	21 km (13 mi)	Kiryat Motzkin, Haifa	From Krayot Central, via HaMifratz Central, Carmel Tunnels to Hof HaCarmel	23	Every 6–10 minutes (no night or Shabbat service)	28 minutes	45 km/h (28 mph)
Orange Line (Line 5/5א)	22 km (14 mi)/ 14 km (8.7 mi)	Yagur, Nesher, Haifa	5: From Yagur Terminal, via Nesher, to Hadar HaCarmel; 5א: From Yagur Terminal, via Nesher, Downtown Haifa, to Bat Galim	15/23	5: Every 7–12 minutes (no night or Shabbat service); 5א: Every 20–30 minutes (on weekends instead of route 5)	45/32 minutes	29.3 km/h (18.2 mph)/26.25 km/h (16.31 mph)

== See also ==
- Carmelit
- Haifa Cable Car
