= Hof HaCarmel =

Hof HaCarmel may refer to:

- Hof HaCarmel central bus station — another name for Carmel Beach Central Bus Station, the main bus station in Haifa, Israel, replacing the Haifa Bat Galim Central Bus Station.
- Hof HaCarmel Regional Council — a regional council located in the northern Israeli coastal plain.
- Hof HaCarmel Train Station — another name for Carmel Beach Railway Station, an Israel Railways passenger station serving the city of Haifa, Israel.
