= Kiryat Shmuel =

Kiryat Shmuel may refer to:

- Kiryat Shmuel, Jerusalem - Neighborhood in central Jerusalem, Israel
- Kiryat Shmuel, Haifa - Neighborhood in Haifa, Israel
