= Krayot central bus station =

Bus station in Haifa District, Israel

Coordinates: 32.8597°N 35.0892°E

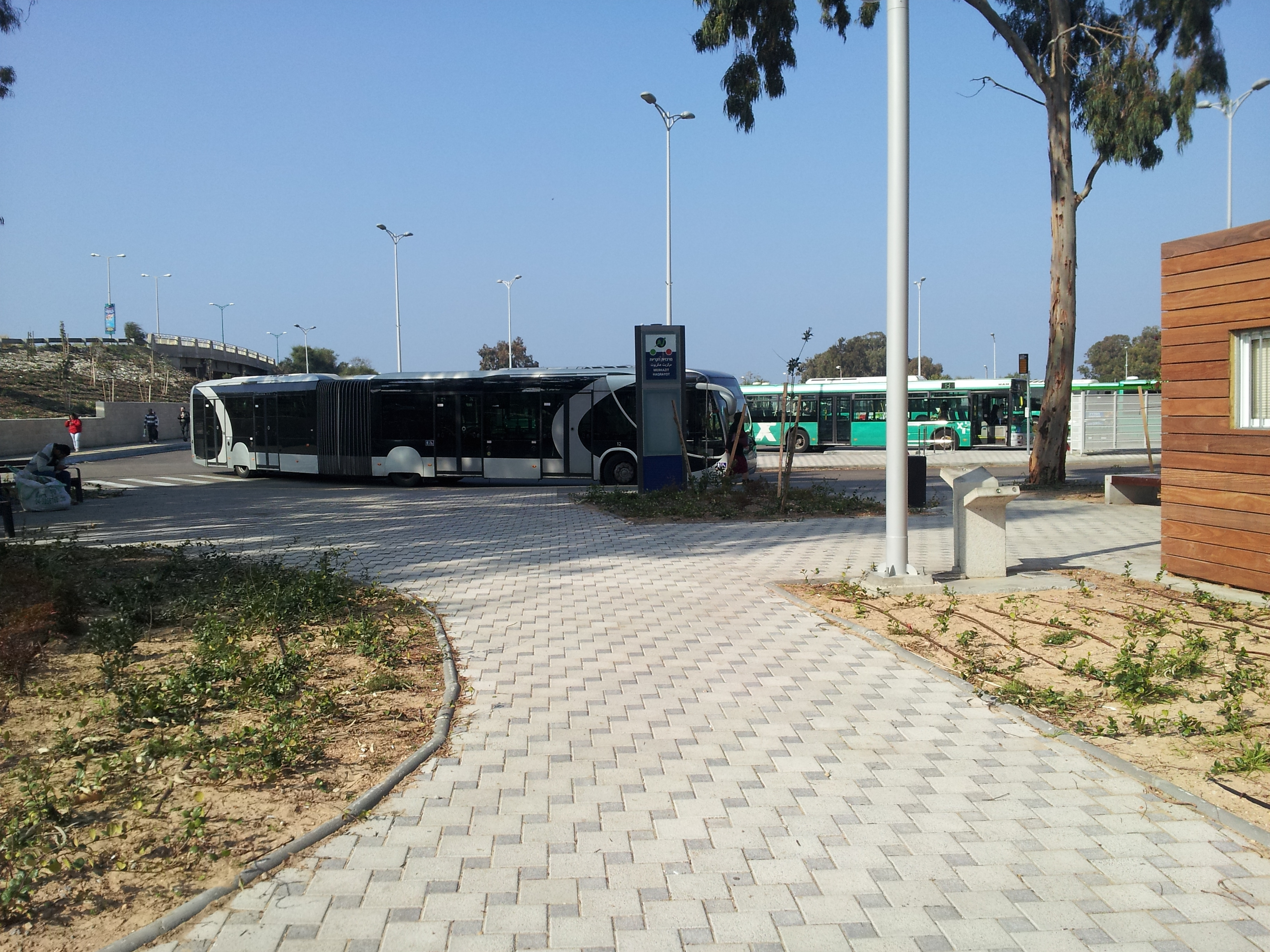
Krayot central bus station

The Krayot central bus station (Hebrew: מרכזית הקריות: Merkazit HaKrayot) is a public transport terminal serving as a terminus for the Metronit bus rapid transit system, and as a station for local bus routes serving the Krayot suburbs of Haifa, Israel.

Despite its name, the station is not located in the center of the Krayot but is located on the northern edge within the municipal boundaries of Kiryat Motzkin. Operations began in August 2013, coinciding with the commencement of the new Metronit system in the region. Since early 2014, the terminal has served as a terminus for three Metronit lines and some Egged bus routes. The Metronit lines currently departing from the terminal are Line 1 to Hof HaCarmel central bus station, that operates 24 hours, and Line 3, that travels through Kiryat Yam to the Hadar HaCarmel neighbourhood in Haifa, And Line 4 that travels like line 1 to Merkazit Hamifratz and then to Hof HaCarmel central bus station via the Carmel Tunnels and the Grand Canyon mall. When the Metronit began, local bus routes were modified to account for the service, with several extended or rerouted to terminate at the Krayot central bus station.

The Krayot central bus station includes car parking facilities and bus shelters. In late 2013, a small shopping mall was opened nearby. The Ministry of Transportation has plans to eventually construct a future second Kiryat Motzkin railway station near the site.

Bus lines from Haifa to destinations north of the Krayot route via the Haifa-Acre Road (Route 4), some 500 meters east of the station, and do not enter the Krayot central bus station. Some do not even stop at the station adjacent to it.
