= Haifa–Hof HaCarmel railway station =

Railway station in Haifa, Israel

Haifa–Hof HaCarmel חיפה – חוף הכרמל
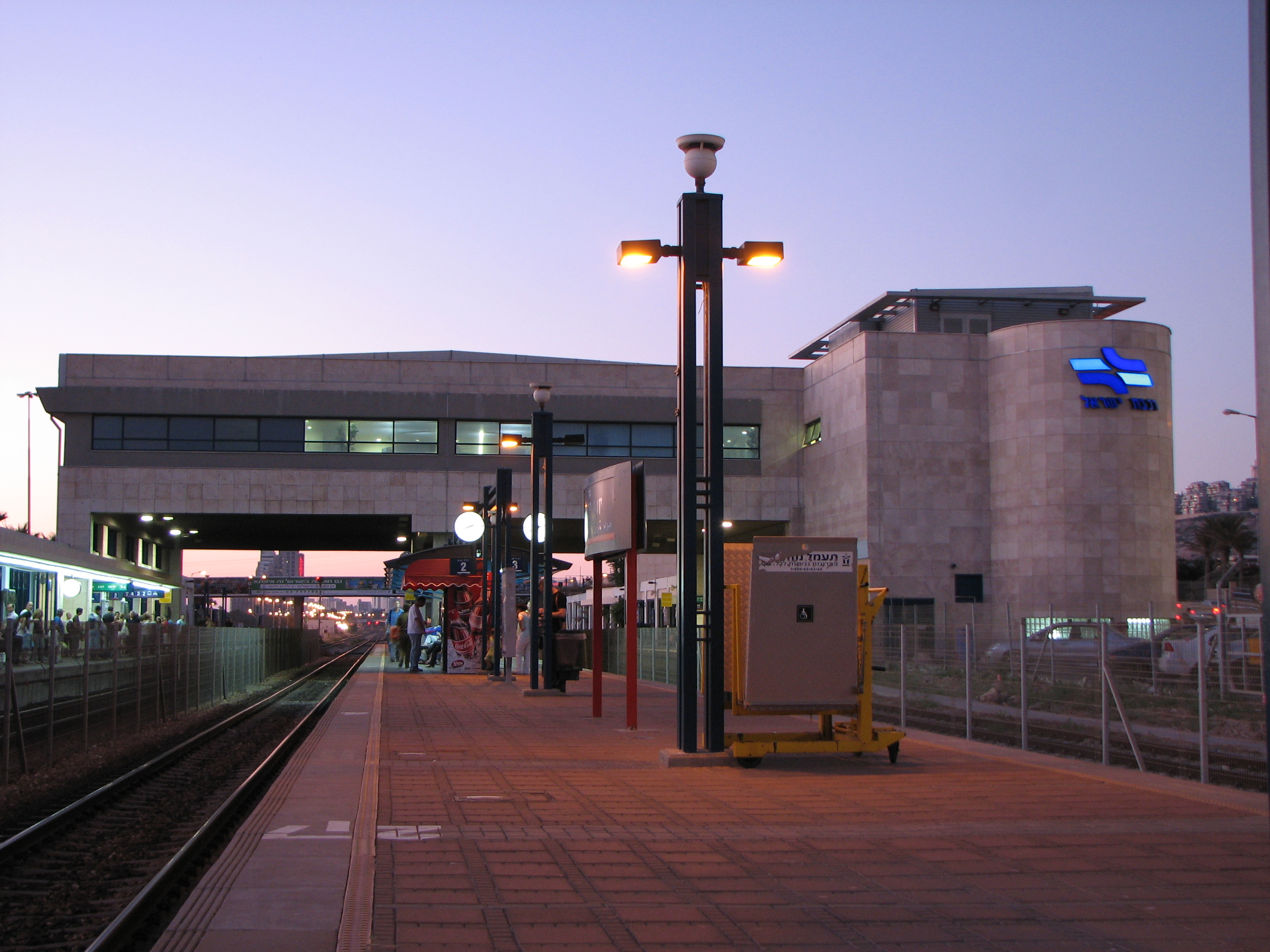
- Looking up from the centre platform, with Israel Railways' control centre situated above.

General information
- Coordinates: 32°47′36.5″N 34°57′26.38″E

History
- Opened: 10 July 1999; 27 years ago

Passengers
- 2020: 1,630,110
- Rank: 6 out of 68
Location

Haifa–Hof HaCarmel railway station (Hebrew: תחנת הרכבת חיפה – חוף הכרמל, Taḥanat HaRakevet Haifa Ḥof HaCarmel, lit. Carmel Coast or Carmel Beach, sometimes spelled Haifa–Hof HaKarmel; Arabic: محطة قطار حيفا – حوف هكرمل or محطة قطار حيفا – شاطئ الكرمل) is an Israel Railways station serving the city of Haifa, Israel.

Although it is not Haifa's official central railway station, its location next to the Carmel Beach central bus station makes it the busiest in the city, and in the country outside of Gush Dan and Jerusalem. Furthermore, it has the most platforms out of any Haifa station, effectively making it the central railway station de facto.

== Location ==
The station is situated on the north-south Coastal line in southwest Haifa. It is located on Sakharov street adjacent to the Hof HaCarmel bus station and the Haifa South interchange, where the Coastal Highway (Highway 2) splits into Highway 4 and the Carmel Tunnels. The station is within walking distance of two shopping malls (Haifa Mall and Castra Mall), Haifa's Congressional Center and the MATAM hi-tech park.

== History ==
During the British Mandate, the station was known as Kfar Samir. Carmel Beach railway station was built during the first half of 1999 as part of the Carmel Beach Transport complex on the southern outskirts of Haifa. It opened on July 10, 1999. In the spring of 2006, work began on a second story to house a modern control and supervision center. The construction was completed by the end of 2007.

During the 2006 Israel-Lebanon conflict train service to the station was suspended after a Hezbollah Katyusha rocket hit a train depot in Haifa on July 16, 2006, killing 8 Israel Railways workers. This suspension meant that Haifa, in addition to the rest of northern Israel, was cut off from the train network. The service was reinstated several days later, after Israel Railways gave in to heavy public pressure led by Haifa's mayor, Yona Yahav. This made it the northernmost station to operate during the war, providing the only train link to the whole of northern Israel.

For most of its operation, Haifa Hof HaCarmel was the busiest station in Israel outside Tel Aviv. However, it lost the title to Jerusalem–Yitzhak Navon in 2020, and was also surpassed in passenger numbers by Herzliya and Ben Gurion Airport in 2023.

On December 16, 2021, National Infrastructure Plan 65-Bet was approved. Under this plan, the station would become Haifa's official central railway station in lieu of Haifa Center HaShmona. Accordingly, four new underground platforms would be built for intercity services, while the current above-ground platforms would service suburban trains exclusively.

== Design ==
The station consists of two side platforms and one island platform, numbered from west to east (1 to 4), between each side platform and the island platform there are two rail tracks – four in total. The length of western platform (platform 1) and the two platforms on the island platform (platforms 2 and 3) is 250 meters, while the eastern platform (platform 4) is only 70 meters in length.

The main station hall is located to the east of the rail tracks. Several meters north of the entrance to the station there is a pedestrian tunnel connecting the railway station with the adjacent Carmel Beach Central Bus Station. In addition, a small station building is located to the west of the rail tracks, allowing access to the beach and the parking lot outside the station.

The two side platforms and the island platform are interconnected by a pedestrian tunnel equipped with lifts allowing access for the disabled. A second tunnel connects the station's eastern and western sides, running alongside but separated by a glass brick wall from the platform-access tunnel, this tunnel was constructed after Haifa's city council demanded that a free access to the beach, west of the station, would be provided, bypassing any station territory where train tickets are required.

Carmel Beach railway station is the only railway station in Israel with a reinforced concrete roof spanning from the eastern station hall to the western station building covering all the rail tracks and platforms, this roof eventually became the floor of the second story of the station, housing Israel Railways' computerized centralized traffic control center. Platform 1 is used for northbound Inter-City trains, platform 2 for southbound Inter-City trains. Platform 3 is used only for suburban trains requiring the relocation of the locomotive from one end of the train to the other and platform 4 is the primary platform used by suburban trains.

== Train service ==
Carmel Beach railway station is a station on the main North-South Coastal line of Israel Railways and serves intercity trains (Nahariya–Haifa–Tel-Aviv–Ben-Gurion Airport Inter-City Service) operating on it and is a terminus for the suburban line serving Haifa's northern suburbs–The Qrayot, Akko, and Naharyia, as well as being an important interchange station between the two railway lines. It also serves trains operating on the Jezreel Valley railway. The station is situated between Haifa Bat Galim railway station to the north and Atlit railway station.

Preceding station	Israel Railways	Following station
Haifa–Bat Galim towards Nahariya	Nahariya–Modi'in	Atlit towards Modi'in–Center
Haifa–Bat Galim towards Nahariya	Nahariya–Beersheba	Herzliya towards Be'er Sheva–Center
Haifa–Bat Galim towards Karmiel	Karmiel–Beersheba	Hadera–West towards Be'er Sheva–Center
Haifa–Bat Galim towards Karmiel	Karmiel–Haifa	Terminus
Haifa–Bat Galim towards Beit She'an	Beit She'an–Atlit	Atlit Terminus
Haifa Center–HaShmona towards Nahariya	Night Train Nahariya–Ben Gurion Airport	Binyamina towards Ben Gurion Airport

== Station layout ==
Platform numbers increase in a West-to-East direction

Side platform
Platform 1	Nahariya–Modi'in trains toward Nahariya (Haifa–Bat Galim) → Nahariya–Beersheba trains toward Nahariya (Haifa–Bat Galim) → Karmiel–Beersheba trains toward Karmiel (Haifa–Bat Galim) → Beit She'an–Atlit trains toward Beit She'an–David Levy (Haifa–Bat Galim) →
Platform 2	← Nahariya–Modi'in trains toward Modi'in–Center (Binyamina or Atlit, alternating every half hour) ← Nahariya–Beersheba trains toward Be'er Sheva–Center (Herzliya during peak hours; Tel Aviv–University during off-peak hours) ← Karmiel–Beersheba trains toward Be'er Sheva–Center (Hadera–West) ← Beit She'an–Atlit trains toward Atlit (terminus)
Island platform
Platform 3	Karmiel–Haifa trains toward Karmiel (Haifa–Bat Galim) →
Platform 4	Karmiel–Haifa trains toward Karmiel (Haifa–Bat Galim) (night services only) →
Side platform

== Ridership ==
Passengers boarding and disembarking by year
Year	Passengers	Rank	Source
2021	2,425,278 (▲795,168)	6 of 66	2021 Freedom of Information Law Annual Report
2020	1,630,110 (▼3,018,656)	6 of 68 (▼1)	2020 Freedom of Information Law Annual Report
2019	4,648,766	5 of 68	2019 Freedom of Information Law Annual Report
