= Rakavlit =

Cable car system in Haifa, Israel

Coordinates: 32.79323°N 35.03313°E

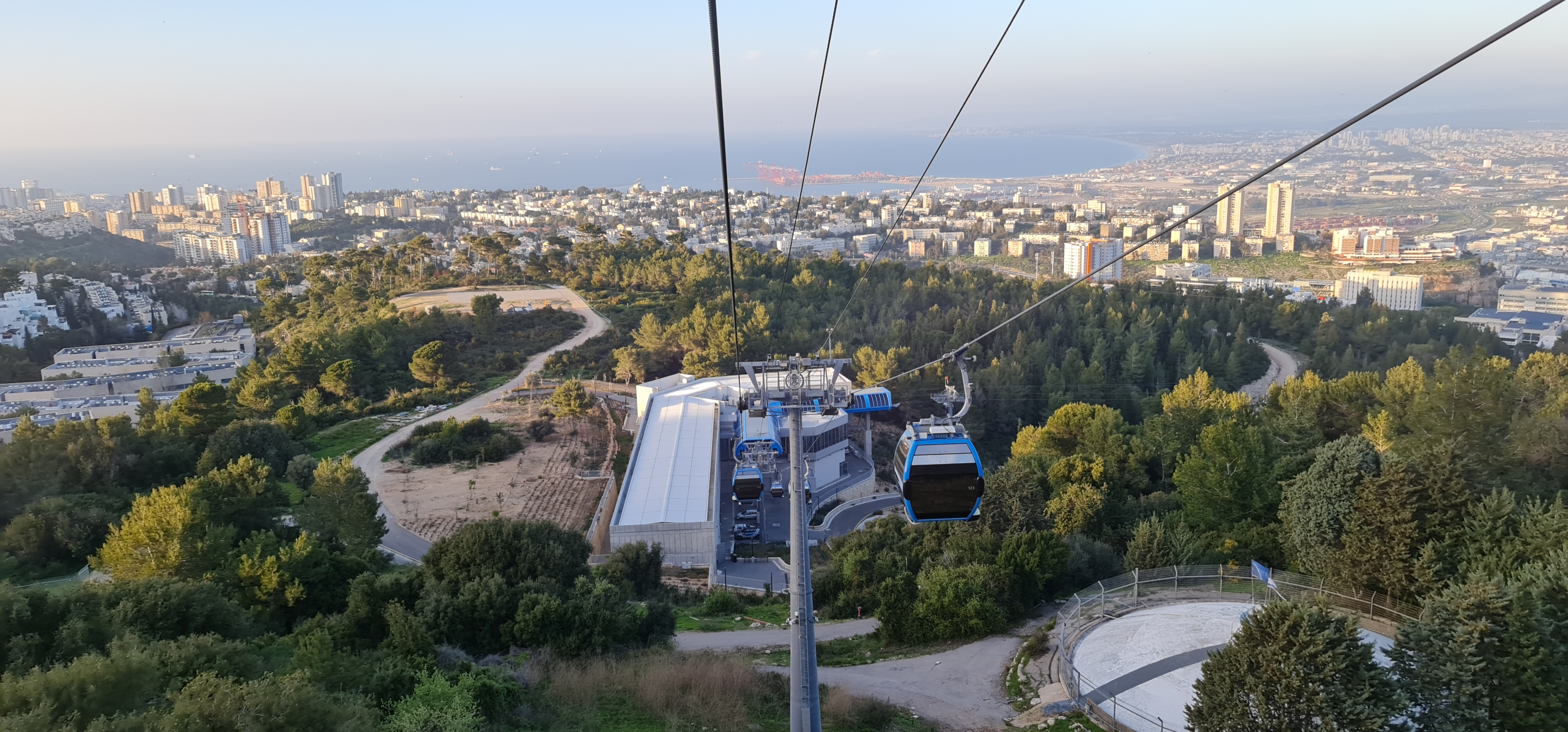
- Interactive map of Rakavlit

Overview
- Status: Operating
- Location: Haifa, Israel
- Termini: HaMifratz Central Bus Station; University of Haifa
- No. of stations: 6
- Open: 2022

Operation
- Operator: Cable Express

Technical features
- Line length: 4.4 km

The Rakavlit (Hebrew: רַכַּבְלִית), is a gondola lift in Haifa, Israel that was opened in 2022 as part of the city's expanded public transport system, complementing the existing city bus and Metronit BRT lines.

The cable car serves 6 stations, only three of which are open for passenger use. Its route runs from the transit hub of HaMifratz Central Station at the foot of Mount Carmel to the Technion and then onto the University of Haifa, and most of its passengers are students of these two universities. The line has a total distance of 4.4 kilometres and an elevation gain of 460m, with the total travel time from HaMifratz Central to the University of Haifa is around 19 minutes.

The name Rakavlit is a diminutive of רַכֶּבֶל, the Hebrew word for 'cable car', which itself is a portmanteau of רַכֶּבֶת ('train') and כַּבֵּל ('cable'). The cable car was named through a competition open to schools in the Haifa municipality. A similar contest was held in 2010 to choose the name of Haifa's Metronit lines.

The Yefeh Nof municipal development company began work on the system in June 2017. Original estimates indicated that the project would cost an estimated 280 million NIS. It is part of a wider plan to address traffic congestion in Haifa, and in particular, on the two university campuses. All discounts presently available on other transit systems are available on the cable car, which is also fully accessible to individuals with disabilities. Non-discounted tickets cost ₪8 for a one-way trip.

The system is served by 148 fully-accessible cable cars that each hold up to ten passengers; 8 sitting and 2 standing. The cable cars depart from the stations every 15 seconds. The total passenger capacity is up to 2,400 passengers per hour in each direction. Announcements are made in Hebrew, English, and Arabic before entry into each of the 3 passenger-served stations. While in passenger-served stations, doors automatically open. The cars do not have air conditioning, although they do have windows that can be opened from the inside. The journey from the HaMifratz Central to the Technion takes about 10 minutes, and another 9 minutes from the Technion to the University of Haifa.

Test runs began on the cable car line in April 2021, with a planned opening date of October 10, 2021. However, media reports the following day indicated that while all infrastructure was complete, a dispute had arisen with Doppelmayr Cable Car, the Austrian cable car manufacturer which was delaying the inauguration of the service. According to official statements from the Israeli Ministry of Transport and Road Safety, the dispute was contractual in nature, while inside sources believed the dispute was financial in nature, with Doppelmayr demanding a further 20 million Euros in payment before they activate the system. The cable car line was finally opened in April 2022.

== See also ==
- Cable cars in Haifa
- Metronit
- Carmelit
