= Haifa Bay central bus station =

Israeli bus station

Coordinates: 32°47′32″N 35°2′2″E

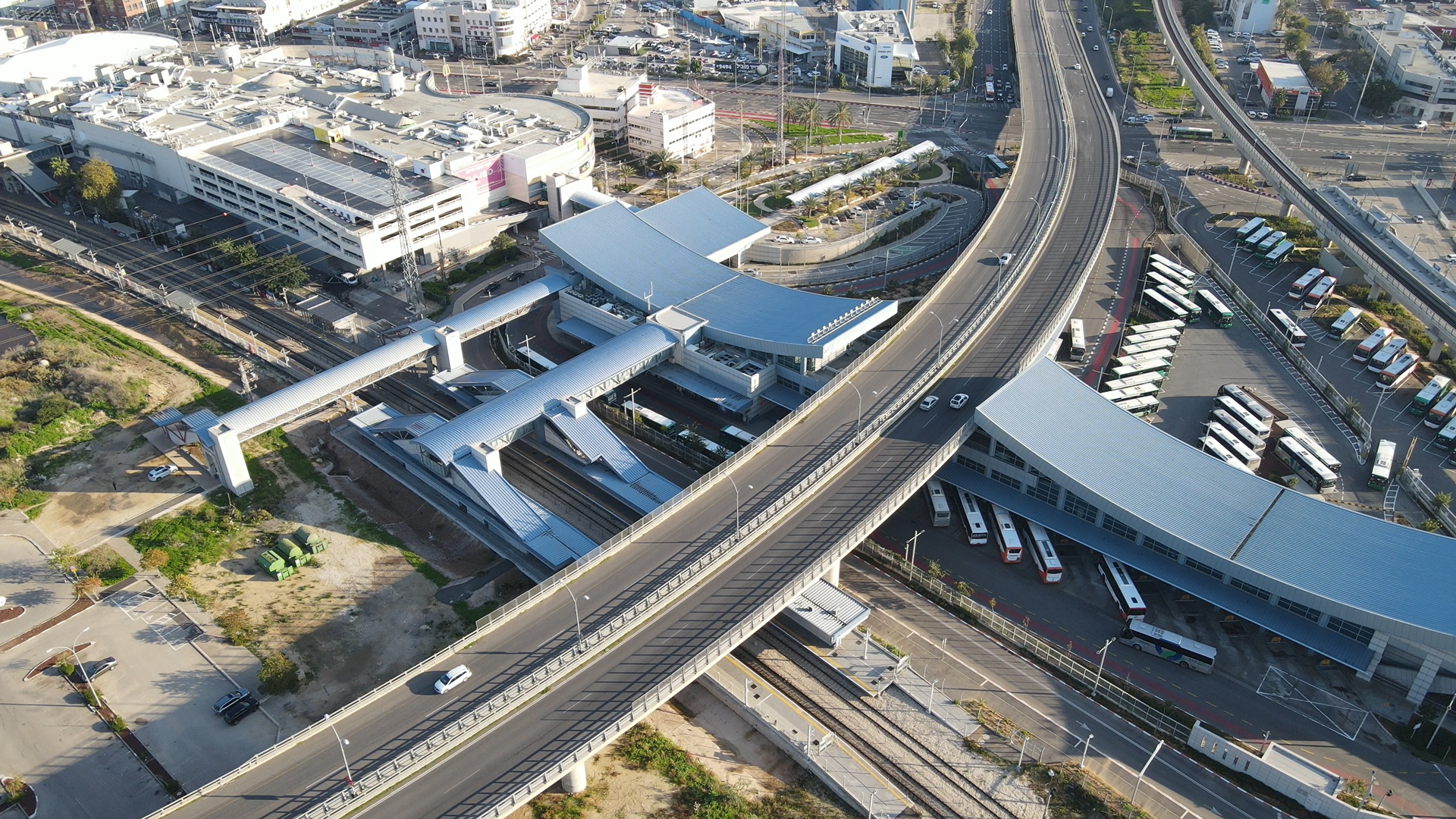
HaMifratz central bus station after renovation

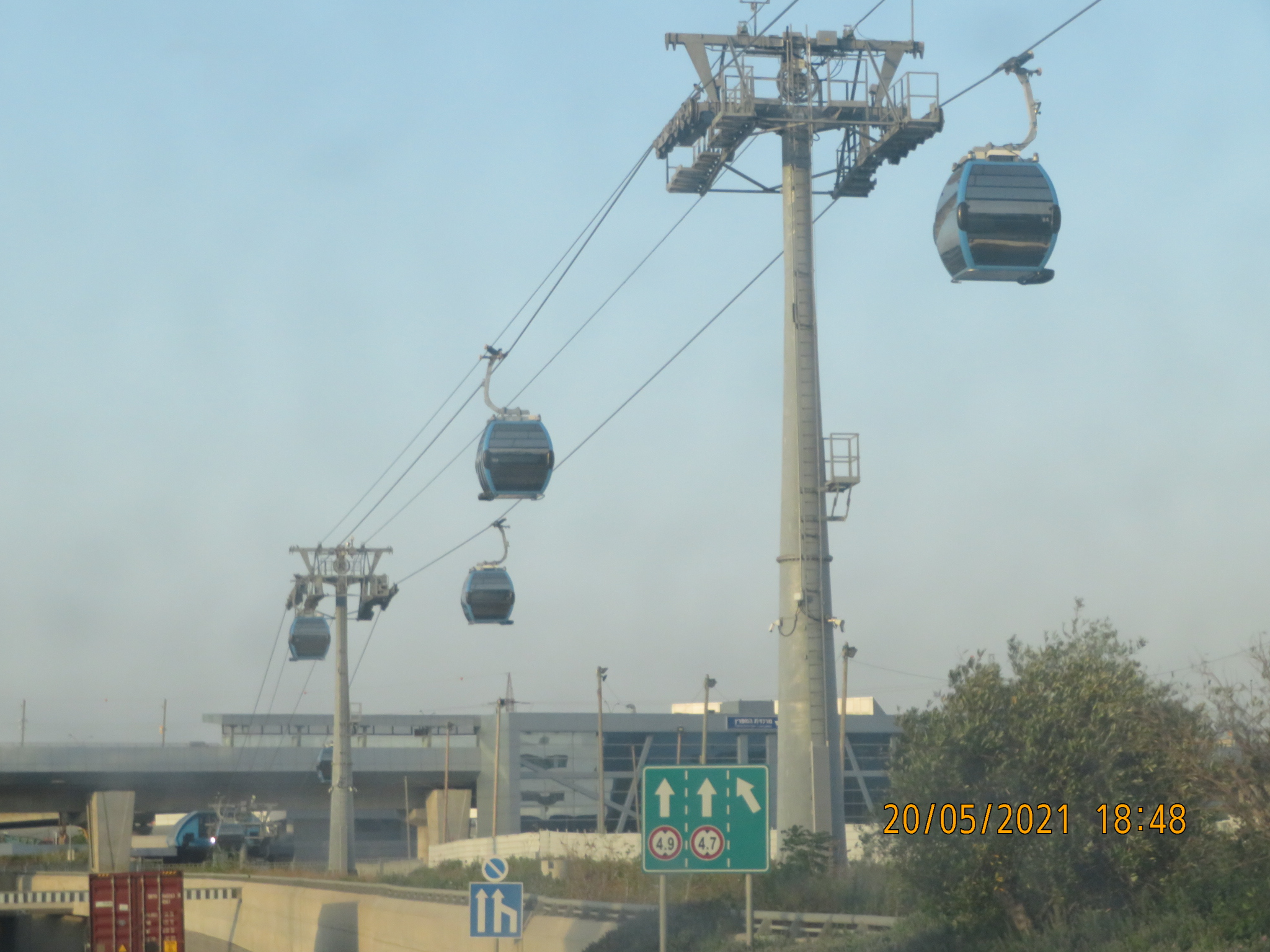
Aerial tramway to Mount Carmel. The bus station building is visible in the background

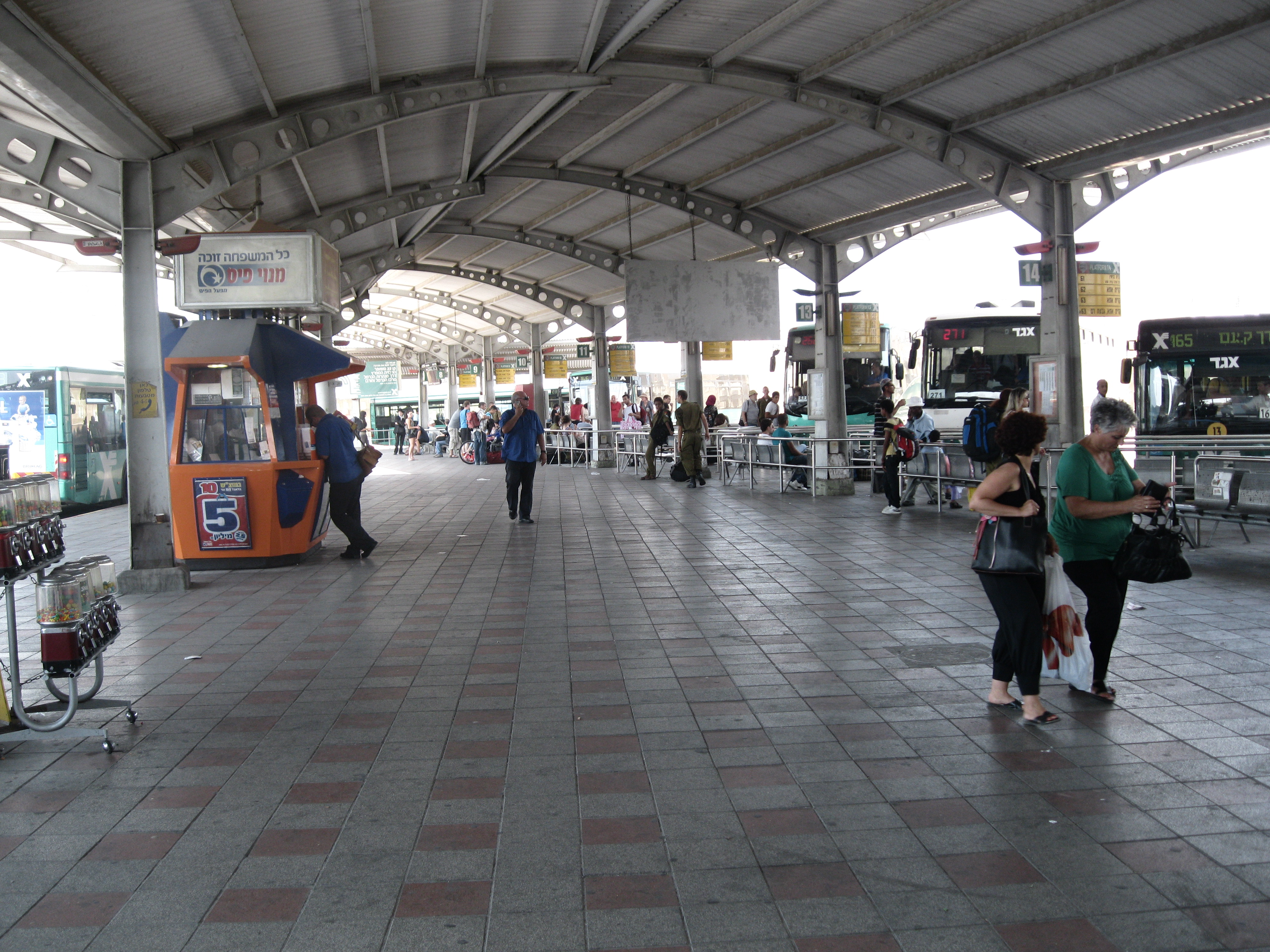
Inside of HaMifratz central bus station before renovation

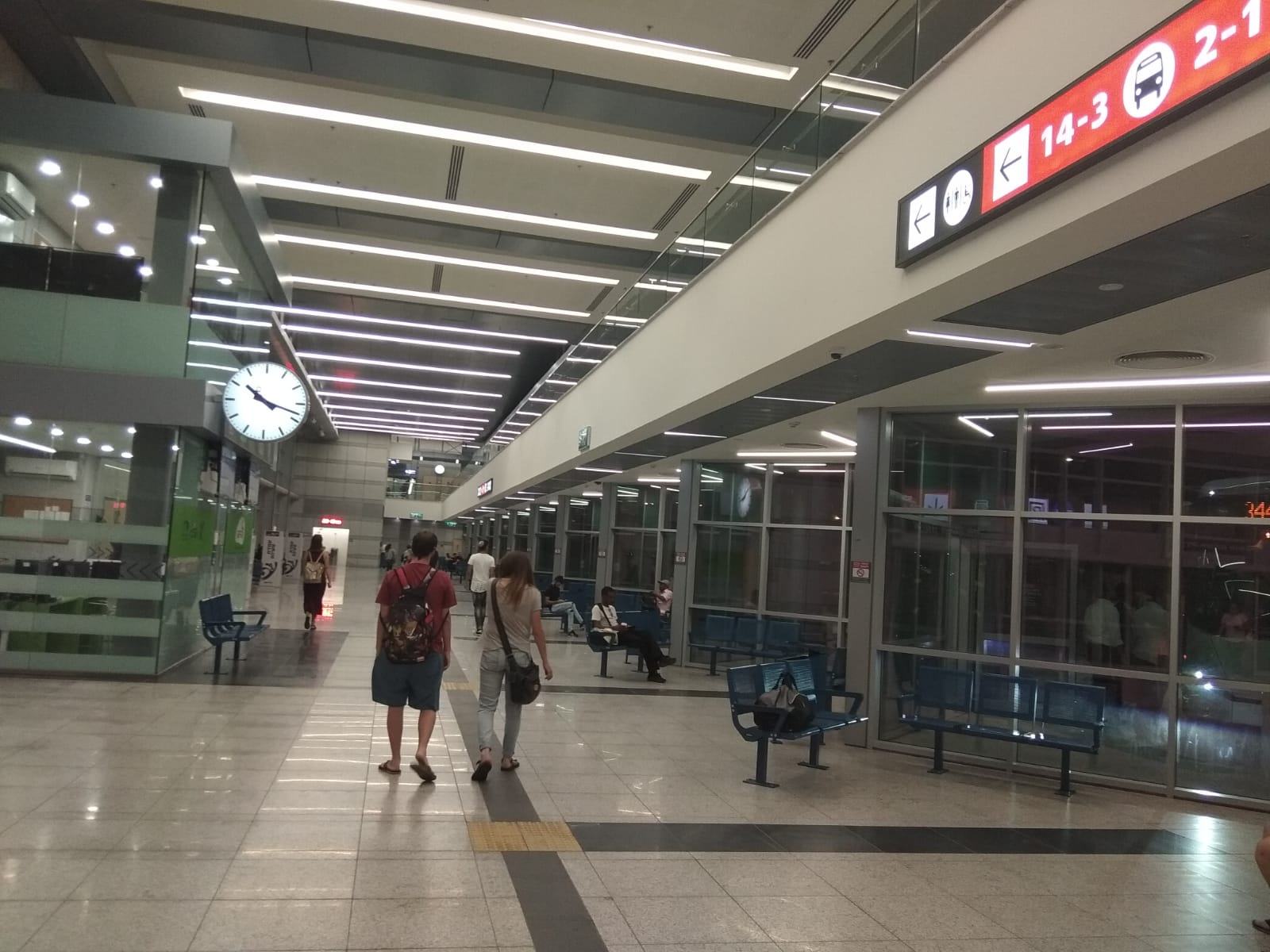
Inside of HaMifratz central bus station after renovation

Haifa Bay central bus station (Hebrew: מרכזית המפרץ, Merkazit HaMifratz, Arabic: مركزيّة هامفراتس (شاطئ حيفا), Mirakaziyyat Hamifrats), known also as HaMifratz central bus station is the main bus station of the Haifa Bay (Mifratz Haifa) area. It is co-located with HaMifratz Central railway station and is adjacent to Lev HaMifratz Mall. It opened in 2002 (24 years ago) and was substantially renovated and expanded in the late 2010s.

== Overview ==
HaMifratz central bus station serves local Egged bus lines within the city of Haifa, suburban lines, and the Metronit BRT system. Egged, Nateev Express and Superbus all operate intercity bus routes. All bus routes from the north and the Galilee which formerly terminated at the old Bat Galim central bus station now terminate at HaMifratz station.

The station is part of a large public transport complex at Lev Hamifratz which serves buses and rail passengers. The station also serves as a terminal for the Rakavlit, a 4.5 km-long aerial tramway connecting the station with the Technion University and other destinations located on Mount Carmel which opened in 2022. The complex will also serve as a terminal for the future Haifa–Nazareth tram-train line which is under construction as of 2022.

Haifa Bay central bus station located in a close proximity to Uri Michaeli Haifa International Airport (connected by Egged line 100).

Rebuilding of the station began in mid 2015 and was finished in October 2019.

== Bus routes ==
The bus routes originating or passing at HaMifratz bus station as of January 2022 are listed below.

=== Metronit BRT ===
Line	Route	Operator	
1	Krayot CBS–Carmel Beach CBS	Superbus	Wheelchair accessible line
2	Kiryat Ata–Bat Galim CBS	Superbus	Wheelchair accessible line
3	Krayot CBS–Hadar HaCarmel	Superbus	Wheelchair accessible line
4	Krayot CBS–Carmel Beach CBS	Superbus	Wheelchair accessible line

=== Local routes ===
Line	Route	Operator	
7	HaMifratz CBS–Nesher	Egged	Wheelchair accessible line
16	HaMifratz CBS–Bat Galim via Neve Sha'anan	Egged	Wheelchair accessible line
40	HaMifratz CBS – Bat Galim via Neve Paz	Egged	Wheelchair accessible line
70, 71, 78, 79	HaMifratz CBS–Nesher	Egged	Wheelchair accessible line
115, 132, 133, 146	HaMifratz CBS–Carmel Beach CBS	Egged	Wheelchair accessible line
100	HaMifrats CBS – Uri Michaeli Haifa International Airport	Egged	Wheelchair accessible line
101	HaMifrats CBS – Carmel Beach CBS, express via Grand Kanyon and Carmel Tunnels	Egged	Wheelchair accessible line
123	Kiryat Ata Junction–Carmel Beach CBS or HaMifrats CBS – Carmel Beach CBS	Egged	Wheelchair accessible line
125	Grand Canyon–HaMifratz CBS	Egged	Wheelchair accessible line, one way
131	HaMifratz CBS–Carmel Hospital	Egged	Wheelchair accessible line, one way
136	Kiryat Ata Junction–Bat Galim via Carmel Tunnels	Egged	Wheelchair accessible line
141	HaMifratz CBS–Haifa University	Egged	Wheelchair accessible line
142	HaMifratz CBS–Technion	Egged	Wheelchair accessible line
225	HaMIfrats CBS – Carmel Beach CBS, express via Kiryat Shprinzak (few times a day)	Egged	Wheelchair accessible line

=== Intercity routes ===
Line	Route	Operator	Notes
72, 72א	HaMifratz CBS–Kfar Hasidim via Nesher	Egged	
73	HaMifratz CBS–Ibtin via Nesher, Kfar Hasidim	Egged	
74	HaMifratz CBS–Ras Ali via Nesher, Ibtin	Egged	
75	HaMifratz CBS–Ramat Tiv'on	Superbus	
165, 167	HaMifratz CBS–Shfar'am	Nateev Express	
166	HaMifratz CBS–I'billin	Nateev Express	
168, 170	HaMifratz CBS–Tamra	Nateev Express	
169	HaMifratz CBS–Deir Hanna	Nateev Express	
180, 181	HaMifratz CBS–Yokneam Illit	Superbus	
188	HaMifratz CBS–Yokne'am Illit	Superbus	
248	HaMifratz CBS–Umm al-Fahm	Superbus	
251	HaMifratz CBS–Akko CBS	Nateev Express	
255	HaMifratz CBS–Kabul	Nateev Express	
261, 262, 264	HaMifratz CBS–Carmiel	Egged	
265	HaMifratz CBS–Carmiel	Nateev Express	
271, 272, 371	HaMifratz CBS–Nahariya Bus & railway station	Nateev Express	
282	HaMifratz CBS–Abu Snan	Nateev Express	
284	HaMifratz CBS–Yarka	Nateev Express	
300, 301, 302	HaMifratz CBS–Afula CBS	Superbus	302 goes via Yoknea'm, 300 is express
306	HaMifratz CBS–Kfar Manda	Nateev Express	
331, 344	HaMifratz CBS–Nazareth	G.B. Tours	331 also starts near Lin Medical Center
332	HaMifratz CBS–Nazareth Illit via Nesher & Migdal HaEmek	Nazareth Tours & Tourism	also starts at the Haifa Center Railway Station
342	HaMifratz CBS–Nazareth Illit via Krayot	Nazareth Tours & Tourism	
352	HaMifratz CBS–Nazareth Illit	Nazareth Tours & Tourism	
358	HaMifratz CBS–Migdal HaEmek	G.B. Tours	
361	HaMifratz CBS–Safed CBS	Nateev Express	
380	HaMifratz CBS–Kalanit. via Maghar	Nazareth Tours & Tourism	
430, 434	HaMifratz CBS–Tiberias CBS	Egged	
432	HaMifratz CBS–Gesher	Superbus	
435	HaMifratz CBS–Golani Junction	Egged	
500, 505	HaMifratz CBS–Kiryat Shmona CBS	Egged	
503	HaMifratz CBS–Katzrin	Egged	
509	HaMifratz CBS–Hatzor HaGlilit Bus Terminal	Egged	
893	HaMifratz CBS–Eilat CBS	Egged	Seasonal line
909	HaMifratz CBS–Tel Aviv New CBS	Egged	
960	HaMifratz CBS–Jerusalem CBS	Egged	
993	HaMifratz CBS–Eilat CBS	Egged	
