= Atlit railway station =

Railway station in Israel

Atlit עתלית
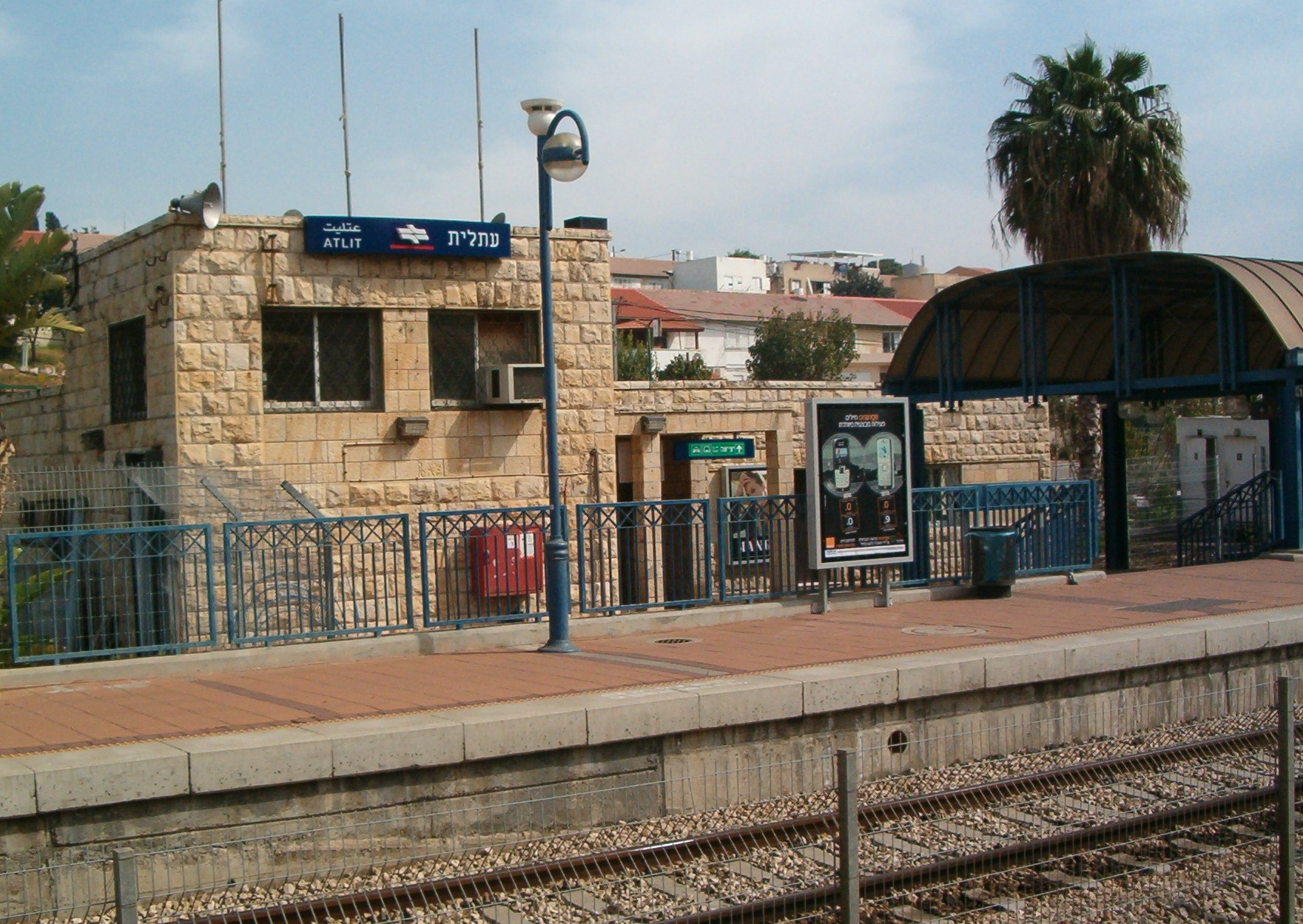

General information
- Location: Harduf St., HaRakevet Quarter, West Atlit
- Coordinates: 32°41′33.91″N 34°56′24.73″E
- Platforms: 2
- Tracks: 3

Construction
- Parking: 50 spaces (3 handicap)
- Accessible: yes

History
- Opened: 1930; 96 years ago

Passengers
- 2019: 363,614
- Rank: 57 out of 68
Location

Atlit railway station (Hebrew: תחנת הרכבת עתלית, Taḥanat HaRakevet Atlit) is an Israel Railways passenger station serving the town of Atlit as well as the surrounding rural communities and military bases.

With 363,614 passengers recorded in 2019, it was the least-used station in the Haifa District.

== Location ==
The station is situated on the north–south coastal line and is located on the north-western edge of the town of Atlit.

== History ==
The station was constructed in the 1930s by the British, during their Mandate for Palestine. The station was designed both as a passenger station and as a freight station serving the nearby salt plant constructed in 1922.

Despite its relatively limited size and significance, passenger trains have been serving the station almost continuously since its opening, this is because the station is located on the main Haifa – Tel Aviv passenger line.

During the 1990s the station underwent a complete restoration, which included an update to the present passenger station format of Israel Railways as well as the erection of a second platform, a pedestrian bridge connecting the two platforms and the preservation of the original stone station hall.

During the 2006 Israel-Lebanon conflict train service to the station was suspended after a Hezbollah Katyusha rocket hit a train depot in Haifa on July 16, 2006, killing 8 Israel Railways workers. The service was reinstated several days later, after Israel Railways gave in to heavy public pressure and reopened both Atlit railway station and Hof HaCarmel railway station.

== Design ==
The station consists of a side platform and an island platform with two parallel rail tracks running between them and a third track on the west side of the island platform. The small station hall is located on the side platform to the east of the rail tracks and a pedestrian bridge and tunnel connect the two platforms.

Platform 1 (the eastern one) is normally used by southbound trains while Platform 2 (the western one) by northbound trains. Platform 3 is usually used by trains which terminate or begin their journey in Atlit.

== Train service ==
Atlit railway station is a station on the main North-South coastal line of Israel Railways (Nahariya–Haifa–Tel Aviv–Ben-Gurion Airport Inter-City Service), although only about a third of all the intercity trains actually stop at the station. It also serves as a terminus for trains operating on the Jezreel Valley railway. The station is situated between Hof HaCarmel railway station to the north and Binyamina railway station to the south. Approximately 35 trains per day in each direction stop or terminate at the station between 05:55 and 22:35 on weekdays.

Preceding station	Israel Railways	Following station
Haifa–Hof HaCarmel towards Nahariya	Nahariya–Modi'in	Binyamina towards Modi'in–Center
Haifa–Hof HaCarmel towards Beit She'an	Beit She'an–Atlit	Terminus

== Station layout ==
Platform numbers increase in an East-to-West direction

Side platform
Platform 1	Nahariya–Modi'in trains toward Modi'in–Center do not stop here → Nahariya–Modi'in trains toward Modi'in–Center (Binyamina) selected trains only → Nahariya–Beersheba and Karmiel–Beersheba trains toward Be'er Sheva–Center do not stop here →
Platform 2	← Nahariya–Modi'in trains toward Nahariya do not stop here ← Nahariya–Modi'in trains toward Nahariya (Haifa–Hof HaCarmel) selected trains only ← Nahariya–Beersheba trains toward Nahariya do not stop here ← Karmiel–Beersheba trains toward Karmiel do not stop here
Island platform
Platform 3	← Beit She'an–Atlit trains toward Beit She'an–David Levy (Haifa–Hof HaCarmel)

== Ridership ==
Passengers boarding and disembarking by year
Year	Passengers	Rank	Source
2021	254,038 (▲110,107)	52 of 66 (▲5)	2021 Freedom of Information Law Annual Report
2020	143,931 (▼219,683)	57 of 68	2020 Freedom of Information Law Annual Report
2019	363,614	57 of 68	2019 Freedom of Information Law Annual Report

== Public transport connections ==
Atlit railway station is located in a fairly remote location, accessible mainly by private cars. The only public transport link is provide by the circular Line 221 connecting the station to Haifa Hof HaCarmel Central Bus Station. The bus on this line runs about every 50 minutes and is not synchronized with train arrival or departure times.
