= Haifa Bat Galim central bus station =

Bus station in Haifa, Israel

Coordinates: 32°49′45.89″N 34°58′59.84″E

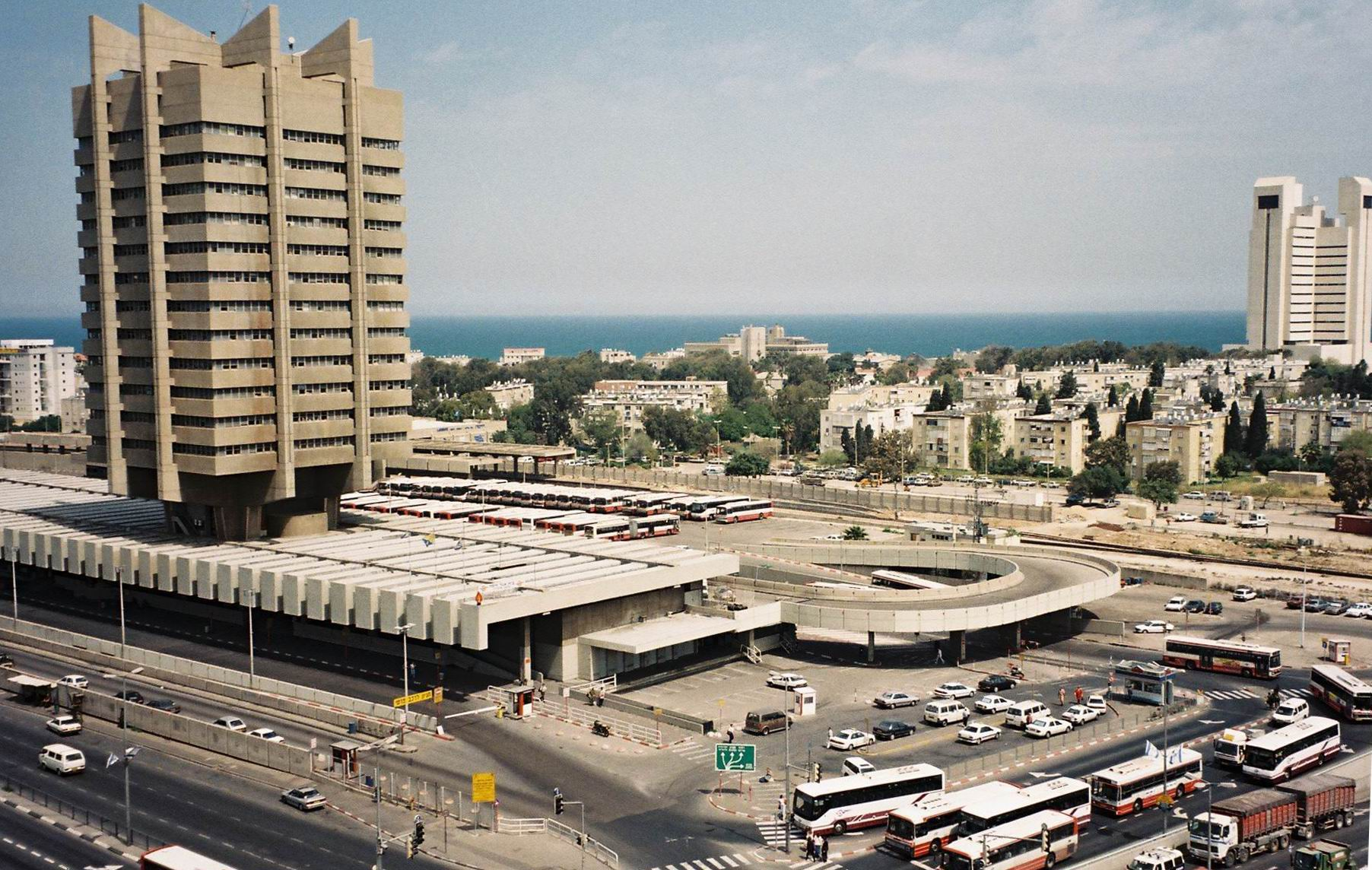
Bat Galim central bus station in 1997

The Haifa Bat Galim central bus station was named after the Haifa neighborhood of Bat Galim. Until January 1, 2002, it served all Egged intercity bus routes originating and terminating in Haifa, as well as most local routes. The Bat Galim station was in use for about thirty years. The main building itself is a Brutalist mega-structure.

The bus platforms at the Bat Galim central bus station were outdoors. The building also housed outdoor stores and restaurants. On the lower level, one side of the building was used for departures, and the other for arrivals. On the upper level, buses arrived on the side of the building used for departures below. There is a tower above the station. A pedestrian tunnel connects the Bat Galim railway station, the Bat Galim bus station and the eastbound bus stops on the opposite side of HaHagana Road.

At the end of 2018, the Netsava company completed the acquisition of control of the complex.

Today the building is completely abandoned and there is no activity in it.

== Replacement ==
On January 1, 2002, the new HaMifratz central bus station opened. At that time, all buses coming from the North and the Galilee began to terminate at the new station, and new more frequent lines operated between the two stations. In late 2003, the Hof HaCarmel central bus station opened, replacing the Bat Galim central bus station as the main bus station in Haifa. All bus lines coming from the South now terminate there, and the Bat Galim station has become just a stop between the two other stations. Free transfers are available inside Haifa for passengers using Egged's intercity bus lines. All three stations connect to local lines within the city of Haifa as well.

== Continued use after replacement ==
The Bat Galim bus station is now only used to store Egged buses, and the tower is used by Egged as office space. Intra-city buses now stop on the road, rather than inside the station, on the route between the Hof HaCarmel central bus station and the HaMifratz central bus station. Several buses have their terminus at new platforms outside the station. All of the original platforms are now closed, as are most stores and restaurants. The pedestrian tunnel is still in use.
