= Beit She'an–David Levy railway station =

Railway station in Israel

Beit She'an–David Levy בית שאן – דוד לוי
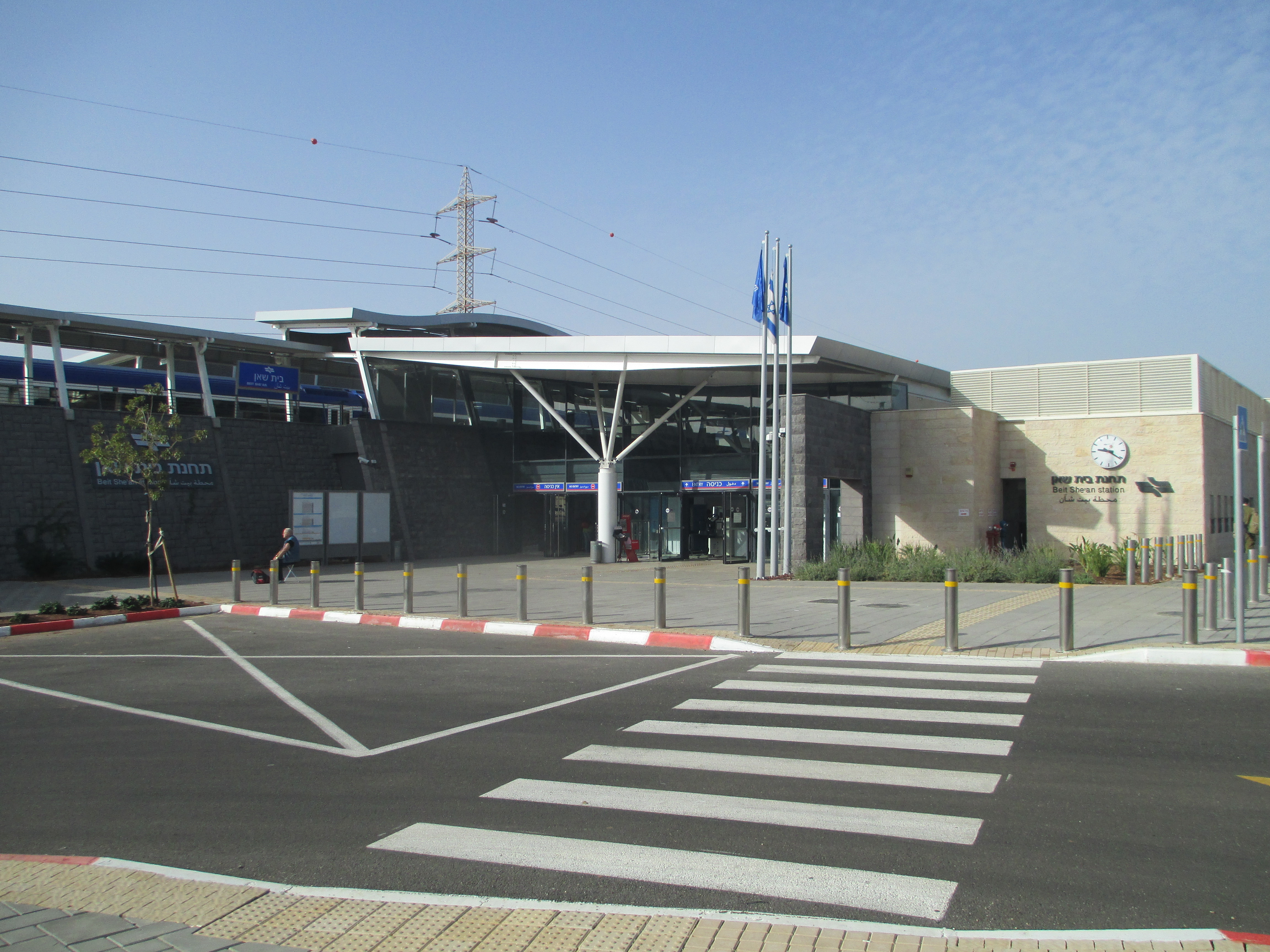

General information
- Location: Northern entrance to Beit She'an off Highway 71.
- Coordinates: 32°30′58.3″N 35°29′17.9″E
- Platforms: 2
- Tracks: 2

Construction
- Parking: 294 free spaces (14 handicap)
- Cycle facilities: 32 spaces
- Accessible: yes

History
- Opened: 1904
- Closed: 1948
- Rebuilt: 2016

Passengers
- 2019: 442,417
- Rank: 53 out of 68
Location

The Beit She'an–David Levy railway station (Hebrew: תחנת הרכבת בית שאן – דוד לוי) is an Israel Railways terminal situated at the eastern end of the Beit She'an – Atlit line, serving Beit She'an and the surrounding communities. It includes a freight rail yard and a passenger station with two side platforms (with the possibility of converting the far side platform to an island platform in the future), connected by a passenger hall located below the platforms. The station is served by 1–2 trains per hour terminating at the Atlit Railway Station via Afula and Haifa.

A railway station first opened at the site in 1904 during the Ottoman era and operated until 1948. With the closure of the Jezreel Valley railway in the late 1940s, the site was abandoned until 2013 when construction began on the new station complex which opened in 2016 as part of the rebuilding effort of the valley line. Some of the original 1904 station buildings can be seen east of the modern station's structure and several have been renovated as part of the new station's construction project. They are accessible using an underground passage located under the eastern end of the station's passenger platforms.

At 120 meters below sea level, Beit She'an railway station is the lowest in the world.

Following the death of David Levy, the station was renamed after him.

== Public transport connections ==
There are seven bus routes that terminate at the station, all of which are operated by Superbus.

- Routes 1 and 2: Beit She'an intracity. These routes replaced the old route 12.
- Route 16: From Kfar Ruppin via Maoz Haim and Neve Eitan to the station.
- Route 17: From Tirat Zvi via Sde Eliyahu and Ein HaNatziv to the station.
- Route 19: From Reshafim via Shluhot to the station.
- Route 21: From Revaya via Sdei Trumot, Tel Te'omim and Rehov to the station.
- Route 27: From Tzemah to the station.
- Route 29: From Gesher via Neve Ur, Yardena, Beit Yosef and Hamadia to the station.

Preceding station	Israel Railways	Following station
Terminus	Beit She'an–Atlit	Afula towards Atlit
