= Kiryat Shmuel, Haifa =

Coordinates: 32°50′2.47″N 35°4′4.23″E

Kiryat Shmuel
- Neighbourhood
- Interactive map of Kiryat Shmuel
- Country: Israel
- City: Haifa

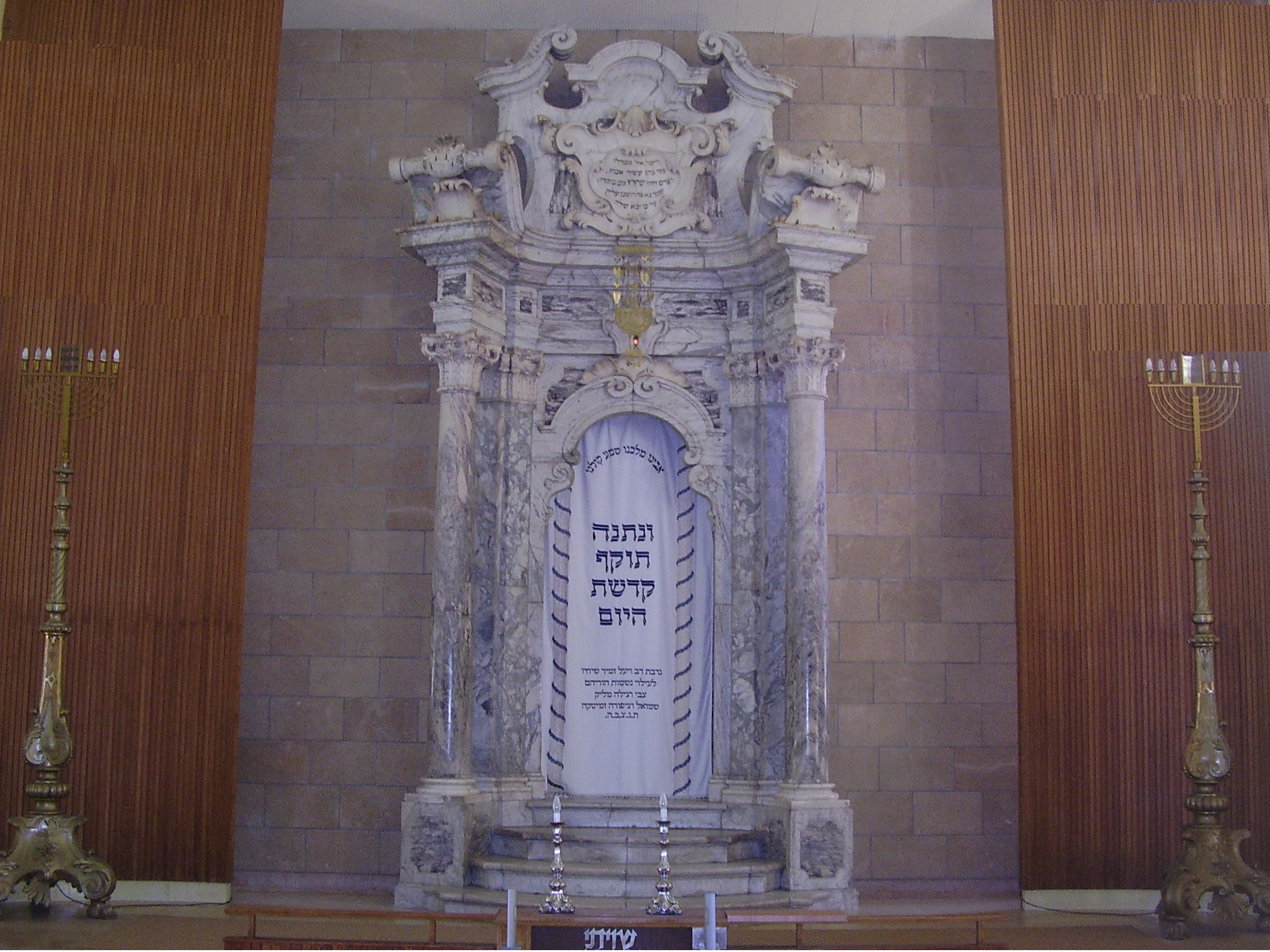
Kiryat Shmuel Central Synagogue, Ark brought from Reggio Emilia, Italy

Kiryat Shmuel (Hebrew: קרית שמואל) is a neighborhood at the perimeter of the city of Haifa in northern Israel. The neighborhood is bounded by Kiryat Haim in the south and in the west, by Kiryat Yam in the west, and by Kiryat Motzkin in the east. It is located about one kilometer from the coast, with a train station on its border with Kiryat Motzkin. Kiryat Shmuel has a population of 5,500 (2007) consisting mostly of Orthodox Jews. The streets of the neighbourhood are closed to motor traffic on Shabbat. The neighbourhood is named after Shmuel Hayim Landau, a leader of the Hapoel HaMizrachi movement.

Kiryat Shmuel was built on the sands of Haifa Bay in 1938, by members of Hapoel HaMizrachi who wanted to live in a town of a religious Jewish-Orthodox character. The founders rejected an offer to build a small neighbourhood within Kiryat Haim and chose to start a new town. Initially Kiryat Shmuel was an independent municipal entity, but in 1952 it was amalgamated into Haifa together with Kiryat Haim.
