= Krayot =

Geographic region in Israel

Coordinates: 32°50′30″N 35°04′17″E

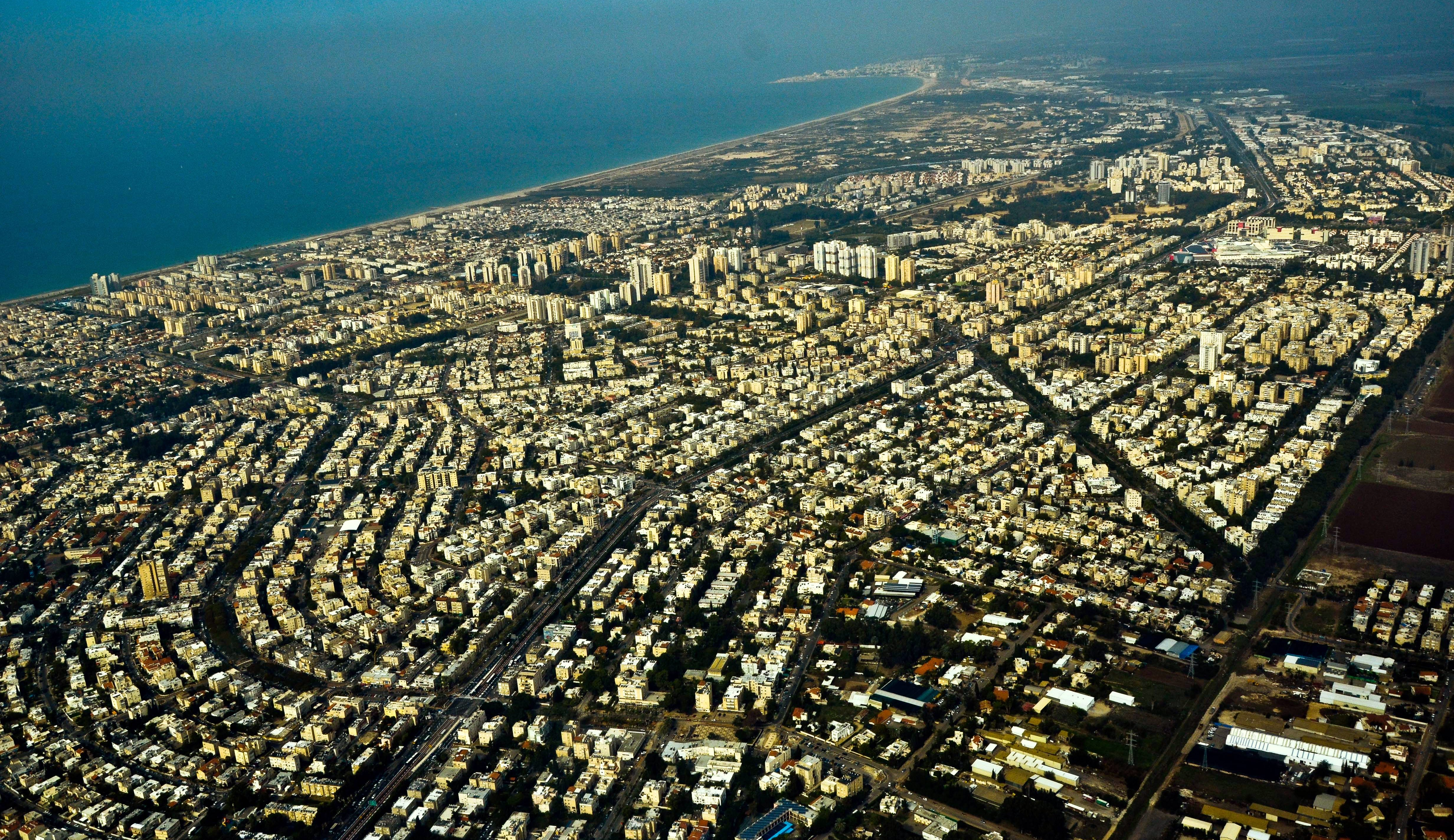
Aerial photograph of the towns of the Krayot. The thoroughfare running through the center, Derech Akko, separates Kiryat Bialik (r) from Kiryat Motzkin (l). Kiryat Yam runs along the coast.

The Krayot or Qerayot (Hebrew: הקריות, "townships") (plural of Kirya) are a cluster of four small cities and two neighbourhoods of Haifa founded in the 1930s on the outskirts of the city of Haifa, Israel, in the Haifa Bay area.

The Krayot include Kiryat Yam (pop. 42,284), Kiryat Motzkin (pop. 48,748), Kiryat Bialik (pop. 36,200), Kiryat Ata (pop. 61,709), Kiryat Haim (pop. 29,000), and Kiryat Shmuel (pop. 7,740, as of 2023).

A plan was formulated in 2003, and again in 2016 by Interior Minister Aryeh Deri, to merge the Krayot into one municipality. A proposed name for this city is Zvulun (after the biblical Zebulun, and the Zvulun Valley).

== The Krayot ==
=== Cities ===
Emblem	City	Population	Area (in acres)	Density (people per sq. km)	First settlement	Ranking (Socio-economic index)
	Kiryat Yam	42,284	12,170	8,606	1941	5
	Kiryat Bialik	50,086	10,000	4,639	1934	6
	Kiryat Motzkin	48,748	3,778	10,612	1934	6
	Kiryat Ata	61,709	16,706	3,470	1925	6

=== Neighborhoods ===
Neighborhood	City	Population	Area (in acres)	Density (people per sq. km)	First settlement
Kiryat Haim	Haifa	29,000	4,550	6,360	1933
Kiryat Shmuel	Haifa	7,740	750	10,256	1935

== See also ==
- Carmel Tunnels
