= Carmel Beach central bus station =

Bus station in Haifa, Israel

Coordinates: 32°47′37.11″N 34°57′33.98″E

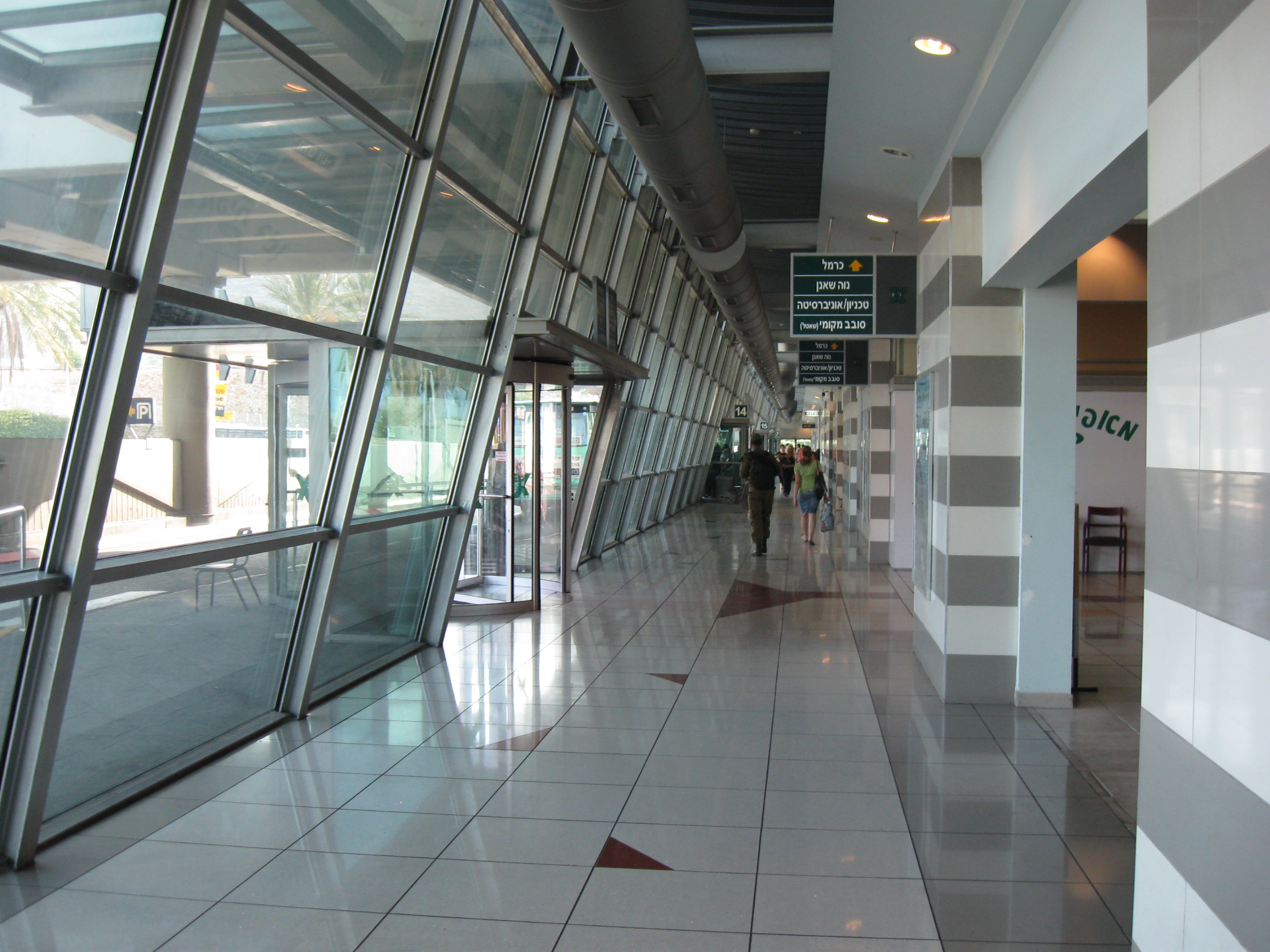
The local platforms

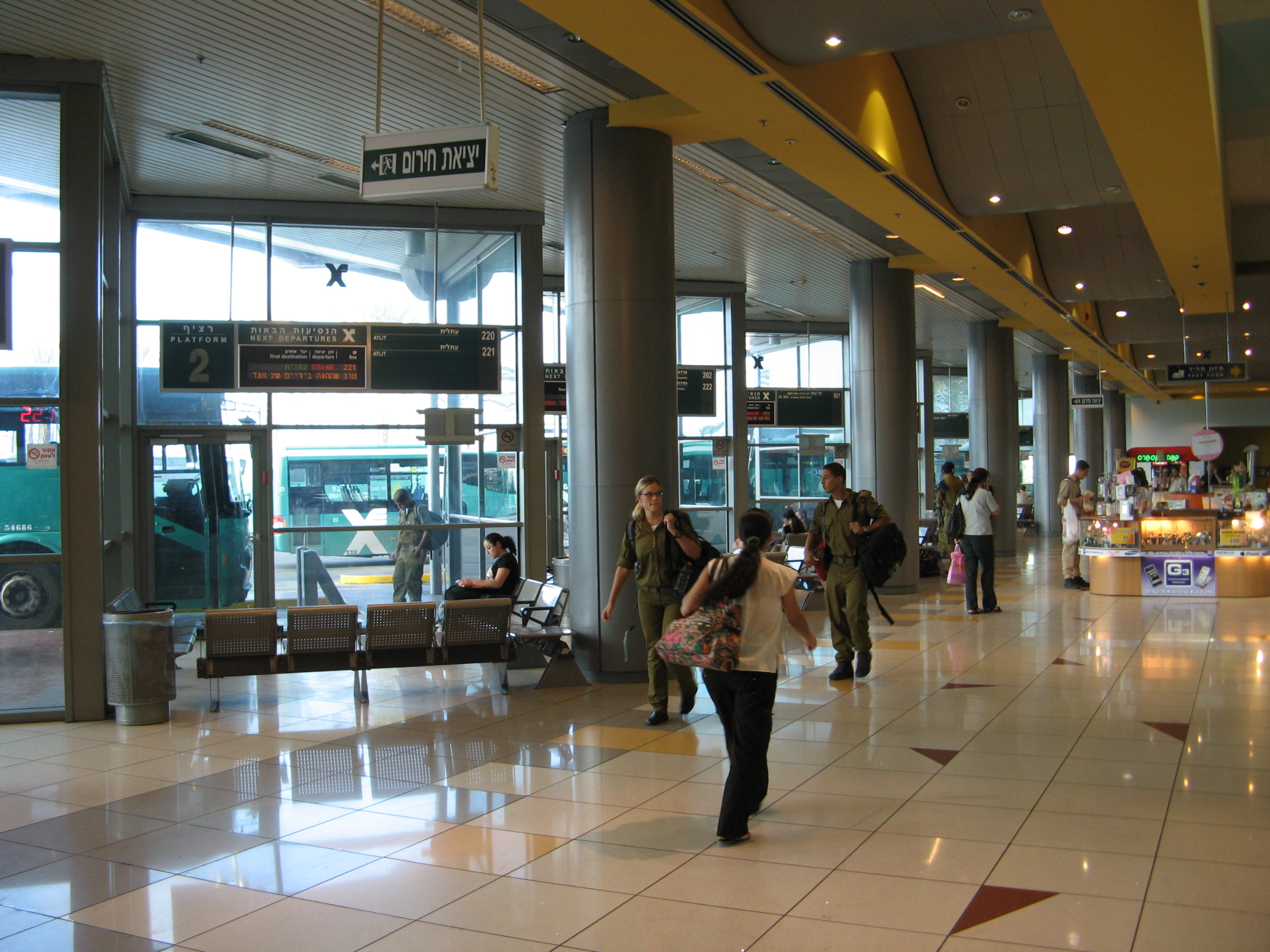
The intercity platforms

Carmel Beach central bus station (Hebrew: מֶרְכָּזִית חוֹף הַכַּרְמֵל, Merkazit Hof HaKarmel) is the main bus station in Haifa, Israel, replacing the Haifa Bat Galim central bus station. The former station is now only used to store Egged buses and for Egged office space and inner-city buses now only stop there on the road rather than inside on the route between Haifa Hof HaCarmel central bus station and the Mifratz central bus station. Carmel Beach central bus station opened on 19 August 2003. Since then, all buses coming from the South which formerly ended at Haifa Bat Galim central bus station terminate at Carmel Beach central bus station and new more frequent lines operate between the three stations. Passengers can get a free transfer to urban buses when they buy their inter-city ticket to continue from one central bus station to the other one, or into the city.

Carmel Beach central bus station serves local Egged bus lines within the city of Haifa and all intercity Egged bus routes heading to the South. The station is also a mall. It has one level and has stores and a food court. At the waiting area for departing buses, there are doors to go outside to the bus platform. At the arrival area, people go inside a door to the building.

Carmel Beach central bus station is adjacent to Haifa Carmel Beach railway station. There is a tunnel connecting the bus station with the train station. From the train station, there is a tunnel to the beach.

A list of Egged's intercity bus lines at Carmel Beach CBS:

== Lines ==
These are the lines that pass through the station, in January 2022.

Lines that departure from the city platforms
Operator	Line #	Destination	Notes
Superbus	1	HaKrayot CBS	Metronit line, wheelchair accessible
Egged	1	Technion	Express route, wheelchair accessible
Egged	3	Kiryat Shprinzak	wheelchair accessible
Egged	11	Technion	wheelchair accessible
Egged	17	Technion	wheelchair accessible
Egged	24	Haifa University	wheelchair accessible
Egged	29	round route via Ramat Almogi	wheelchair accessible
Egged	43	Bat Galim Railway Station	wheelchair accessible
Egged	54	Daliyat-al-Karmel	wheelchair accessible
