= Railway to Karmiel =

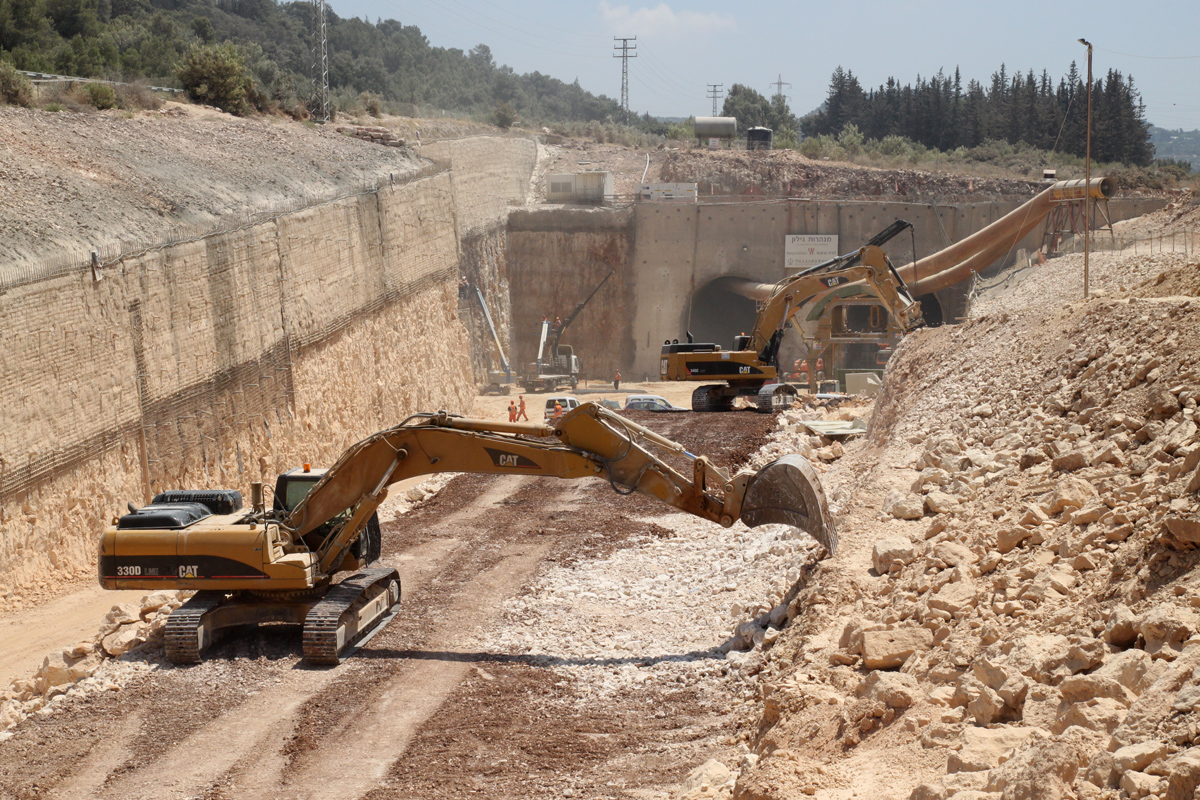
Construction activity near the western portal of the Gilon Tunnels in August 2012.

The Railway to Karmiel is a railway linking Haifa and Karmiel in northern Israel. It opened in 2017 and consists of a double track standard gauge railway stretching for 23 km from near Acre (Akko) to Karmiel. It branches eastwards from the Coastal Railway between the Kiryat Motzkin Railway Station and the Acre Railway Station (at a point nearby where the Coastal Railway passes over the Na'aman River) and includes a 5 km long tunnel (composed of two parallel single-track tunnels) in the mountainous region near the eastern end of the line. Most of the route is in the vicinity of Highway 85. There are two stations on the railway: Ahidud and Karmiel.

From Karmiel, a plan exists to eventually extend the railway to Korazim (near Safed) and from there to Kiryat Shmona at the very northern tip of Israel. The Northern District Planning and Building Committee approved plans for the line in the spring of 2021. The plan will include considerable tunneling and bridging work and will cost at least NIS 20 bn.

== Planning and financing ==
The railway was first proposed in the early 2000s but the plans were put on hold in the Sharon government due to financial reasons. An alternative plan to instead create a light rail line from Haifa to Karmiel was rejected. The Knesset's Research and Information Centre criticised the relevant authorities for not doing enough research on the advantages and disadvantages of light vs. heavy rail in the project. The light rail plan was supported by Ministry of Finance and Haifa's development company Yefe Nof, while the heavy rail plan was supported by Israel Railways and the Karmiel municipality. The light rail to Karmiel would have been part of a larger project that would include Nazareth and Acre. The Nazareth section was eventually also rejected in favour of a heavy rail line.

In 2009, a number of northern municipalities turned to the Negev and Galilee Development minister Silvan Shalom in an effort to promote the plan for the railway. They argued that it was necessary for the construction of viable institutions of higher education in the region. On November 26, 2009, Transportation Minister Yisrael Katz approved the plans. However, this did not immediately translate into financial approval.

On February 24, 2010, the Israeli government voted to appropriate funds to construct the line as part of a larger national infrastructure spending package. A budget of NIS 2.8 billion (about US$750 million) was approved for the project, not including the cost of electrifying the line, which was approved as part of a separate NIS 2.2 billion appropriation which also includes the cost of rolling stock for the Karmiel and some other new lines.

== Route and technical specifications ==
The railway is double track with a length of 23 kilometers (14 mi) per track, from the Coastal Railway to the entrance to Karmiel. The majority of the route follows the east–west Highway 85. The railway's design speed is 160 kilometers per hour (99 mph). It currently operates using diesel rolling stock but is expected to undergo electricification beginning sometime in the early 2020s.

The railway will include two stations, Ahihud and Karmiel, with the possibility of additional stations adjacent to Jadeidi-Makr and Majd al-Krum. It has been declared a national project under National Infrastructure Plan 12/2. In the future, it will be extended to Kiryat Shmona, the northernmost city in Israel.

== Construction ==
Upon the approval of the line, construction was expected to last between 2011 and 2015. The National Roads Company, which is coordinating the project, published a total of six design-build tenders for the railway, including four infrastructure tenders and a tender for each of the two stations on the line. The following sections are included in the infrastructure tenders:

Na'aman Junction – Yasif Junction
A 6.5 km (4.0 mi) section, including bridges over the Na'aman and Hilazon streams, a 900 meters (980 yd) diversion of Hilazon Stream, and converting 1.2 km (1,300 yd) of Highway 4 to a bridge over the railway. The tender was published on March 17, 2011 and the winner, Terre Armee, was chosen in late June 2011. Work on the section itself is expected to start in early 2012 and end in late 2013.
Yasif Junction – Bar Lev Industrial Zone (Ahihud)
The tender for this section will be published in early 2012.
Gilon Tunnels
A pair of 4.6 to 5 km (2.9 to 3.1 mi) tunnels, as well as 18 connection and escape tunnels, under Mount Gilon between Ahihud and Karmiel. The estimated cost of this section is NIS 1 billion, including NIS 600 million for the construction and 400 million for right-of-way acquisitions. In August 2011, Danya Cebus and the Chinese company CCECC won the tender, beating Hofrei HaSharon and Max Bögl, Minrav and Moscow Metrostroy, Eyal Sela and Roltsur Tunnels, and Shafir Engineering and Impresa Pizzarotti. Planning was expected to take 8 months, while construction was to take an approximate 32 months. Work on the tunnel started in April 2012.

Construction of the line was completed in March 2017 and service began in September of that year.
