= Kiryat Haim railway station =

Railway passenger station in Israel

Coordinates: 32°49′29.33″N 35°3′51.11″E

Kiryat Haim קריית חיים
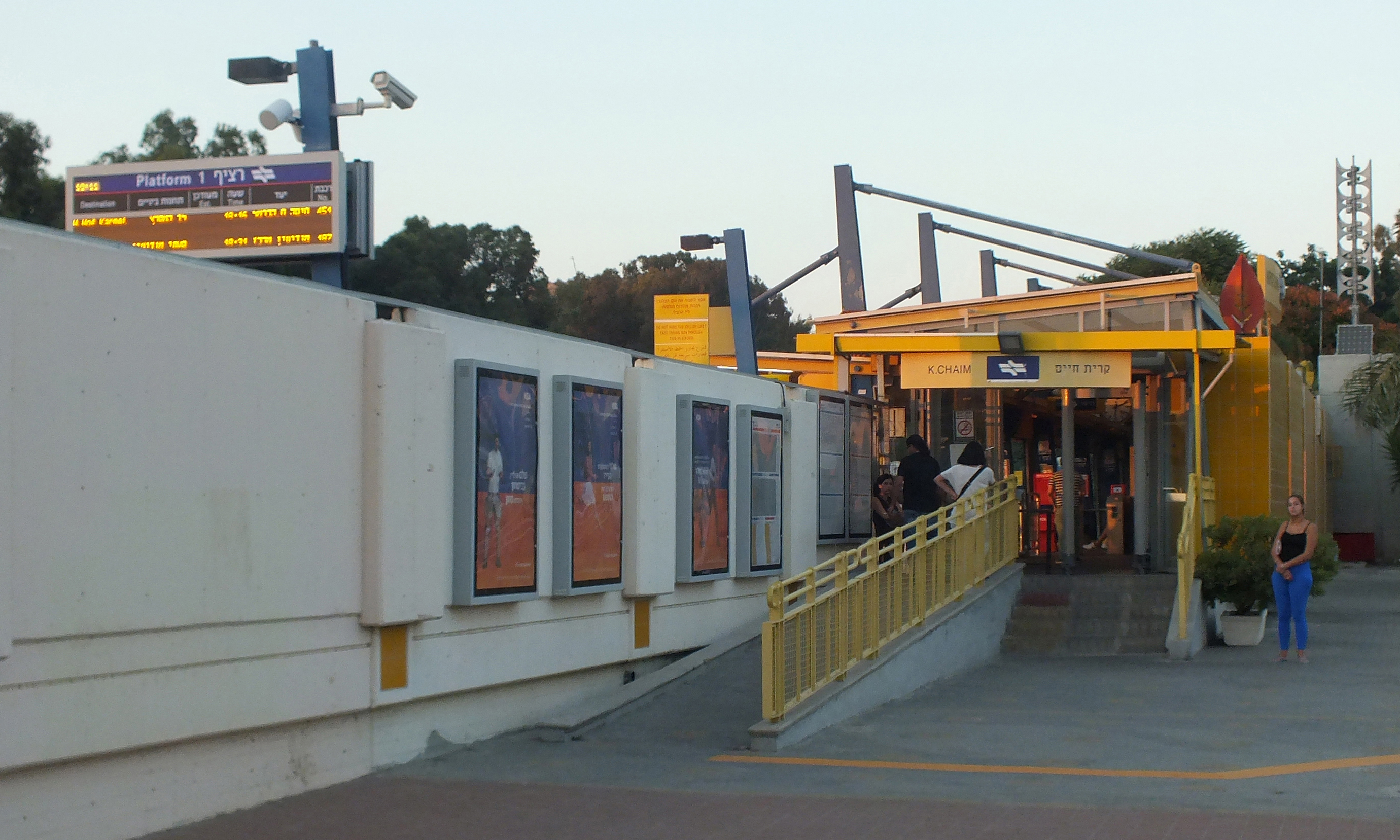
- Entrance to Kiryat Haim railway station

General information
- Location: 1 Achi Eilat St., Haifa; Israel
- Platforms: 2
- Tracks: 2

Construction
- Parking: 200 free spaces
- Cycle facilities: 10 spaces
- Accessible: Yes

Passengers
- 2019: 480,814
- Rank: 51 out of 68
Location

Kiryat Haim railway station (Hebrew: תחנת הרכבת קרית חיים, Tahanat HaRakevet Kiryat Haim) is an Israel Railways passenger station serving Haifa's borough of Kiryat Haim and its immediate surrounding region.

== Location ==
The station is situated on the north–south coastal line and is located on Brodetsky Street (Hebrew: רחוב ברודצקי, Rekhov Brodetski) in the central part of the town, on the administrative border between Eastern and Western Kiryat Haim. The station is one of two railway stations serving Haifa's northern suburbs – the Krayot (the other being Kiryat Motzkin railway station), although it is slightly smaller in terms of passenger numbers and trains serving it. The station is also one of six railway stations within Haifa's municipal borders.

== History ==
The present-day station stands on the spot of a halt that existed as early as the 1930s on the Beirut–Cairo railway, constructed by the British during their Mandate for Palestine, connecting Kiryat Haim's residential areas with Haifa's sea port, the main employer of the residents at that time.

Until the mid-1990s a small shed was the only structure marking the station. At that time a station was constructed according to the present passenger station format of Israel Railways. The station now consists of two platforms with two parallel rail tracks running between them, a pedestrian tunnel connecting the two platforms and a small station building on the eastern side (Kiryat Haim Mizrahit (Eastern) exit) as well as an exit on the west side (Kiryat Haim Ma'aravit (Western) exit).

In the early 2000s a tunnel was constructed directly beneath the station's platforms replaced the dangerous level crossing that existed just north of the station.

During the 2006 Israel-Lebanon conflict train service to the station was suspended after a Hezbollah Katyusha rocket hit a train depot in Haifa on July 16, 2006, killing 8 Israel Railways workers. It was restored 29 days later, on August 14, two days after the ceasefire went into effect.

== Train service ==
Kiryat Haim is a station on both the main north–south coastal line of Israel Railways (Nahariya–Haifa–Tel Aviv–Ben Gurion Airport–Be'er Sheva Inter-City Service) and the suburban line serving Haifa's northern suburbs – The Kerayot (Haifa–Kiryat Motzkin Suburban Service). The station is situated between Kiryat Motzkin railway station to the north and Hutzot HaMifratz railway station to the south.

Preceding station	Israel Railways	Following station
Kiryat Motzkin towards Nahariya	Nahariya–Modi'in	Hutzot HaMifratz towards Modi'in–Center
Kiryat Motzkin towards Karmiel	Karmiel–Haifa	Hutzot HaMifratz towards Haifa–Hof HaCarmel

== Station layout ==
Platform numbers increase in an East-to-West direction

Side platform
Platform 1	Nahariya–Modi'in trains toward Modi'in–Center (Hutzot HaMifratz) → Nahariya–Beersheba and Karmiel–Beersheba trains toward Be'er Sheva–Center do not stop here → Karmiel–Haifa trains toward Haifa–Hof HaCarmel (Hutzot HaMifratz) →
Platform 2	← Nahariya–Modi'in trains toward Nahariya (Kiryat Motzkin) ← Nahariya–Beersheba trains toward Nahariya do not stop here ← Karmiel–Beersheba trains toward Karmiel do not stop here ← Karmiel–Haifa trains toward Karmiel (Kiryat Motzkin)
Side platform

== Ridership ==
Passengers boarding and disembarking by year
Year	Passengers	Rank	Source
2020	171,289 (▼309,525)	52 of 68 (▼1)	2020 Freedom of Information Law Annual Report
2019	480,814	51 of 68	2019 Freedom of Information Law Annual Report

== Public transport connections ==
Kiryat Haim railway station is located about 1.5 km the west of the main highway ( Highway 4) and thus is out of walking distance from a large number of bus lines. Two Egged bus lines, routes 13 and 26, have a stop in the entrance to the tunnel beneath the station, both running at about 20 minute intervals.
