= Kiryat Haim =

Neighborhood of Haifa, Israel

Coordinates: 32°50′N 35°4′E

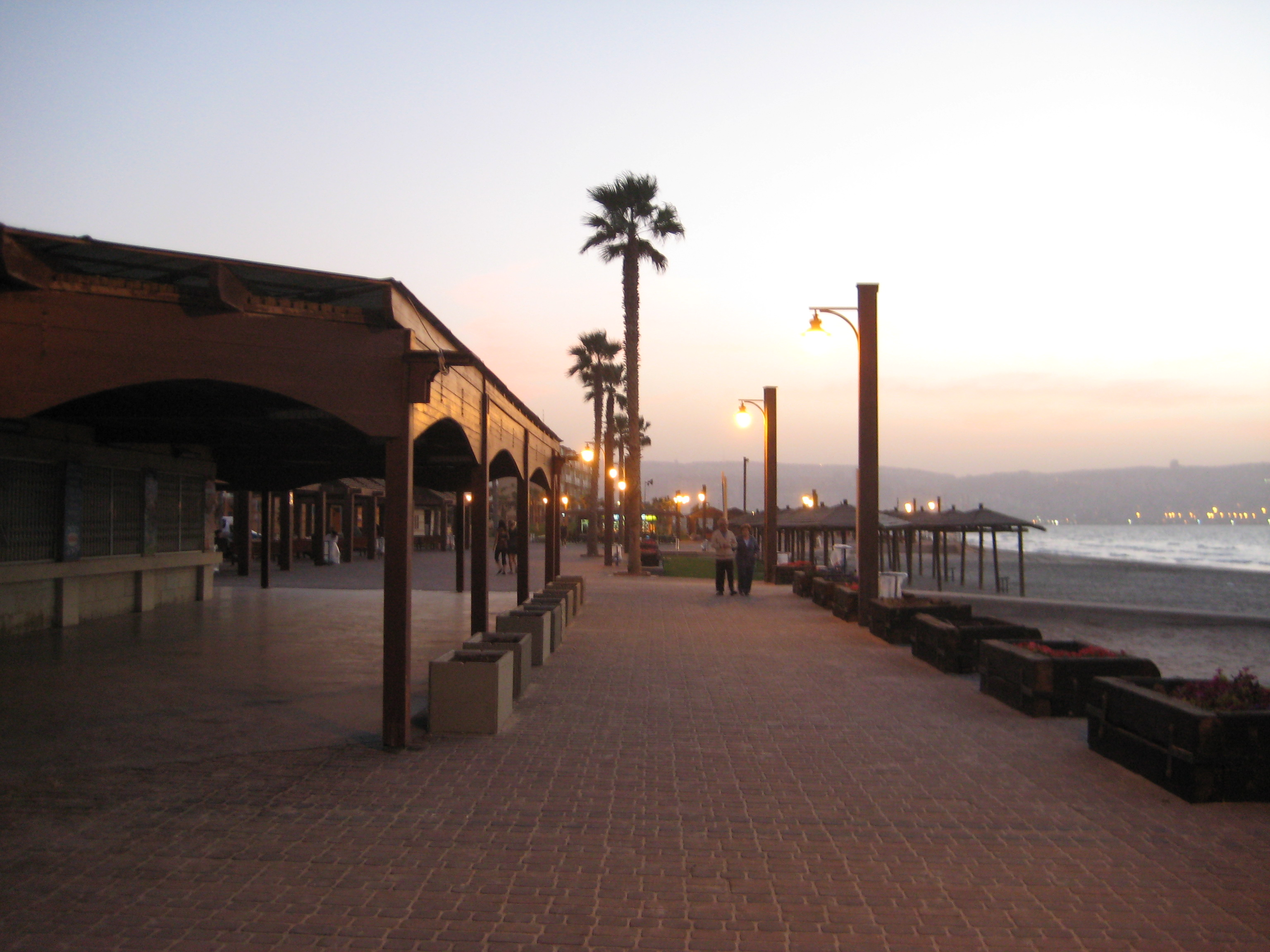
Kiryat Haim promenade

Kiryat Haim (Hebrew: קריית חיים pronounced [kiʁˈjat χaˈjim]) is a neighborhood of Haifa. It is considered part of the Krayot cluster in the northern part of metropolitan Haifa. In 2008, Kiryat Haim had a population of just under 27,000. Kiryat Haim is within the municipal borders of the city of Haifa and lies on the shore of the Mediterranean Sea.

== History ==
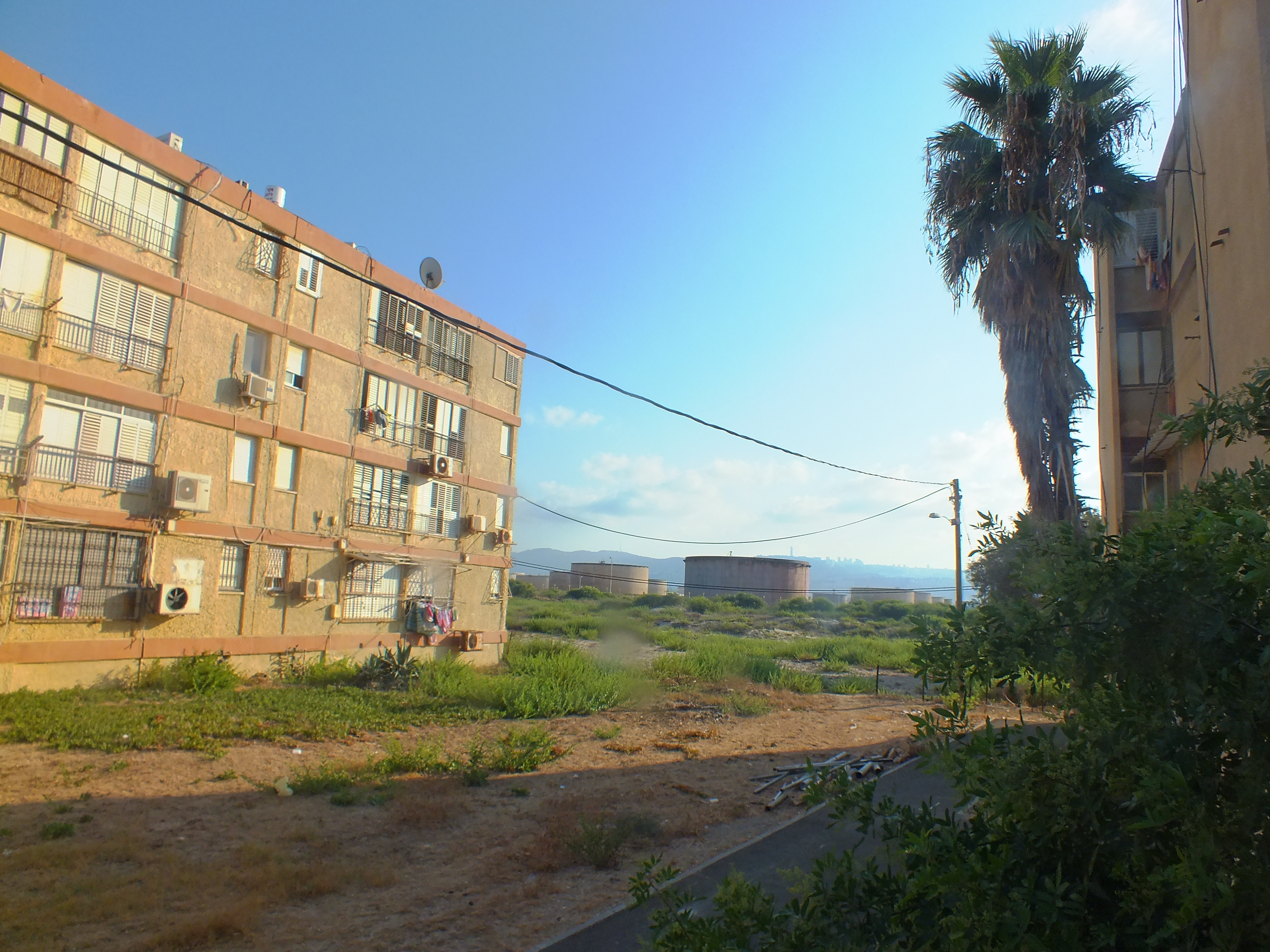
A terraced house in Western Kiryat Hayim

Kibbutz Kfar Masaryk, a group formed in Petah Tikva in 1932 and originally known as "Czecho-Lita", as its members came from Czechoslovakia and Lithuania, moved to Bat Galim in 1933 and then to the sand dunes of Kiryat Haim, west of the railway. The kibbutz raised vegetables and opened a dairy farm. At this point it adopted a new name: Mishmar Zevulun (Guardian of Zevulun Valley).

Kiryat Haim was named after Haim Arlosoroff.

=== Gallery 1929-46 ===
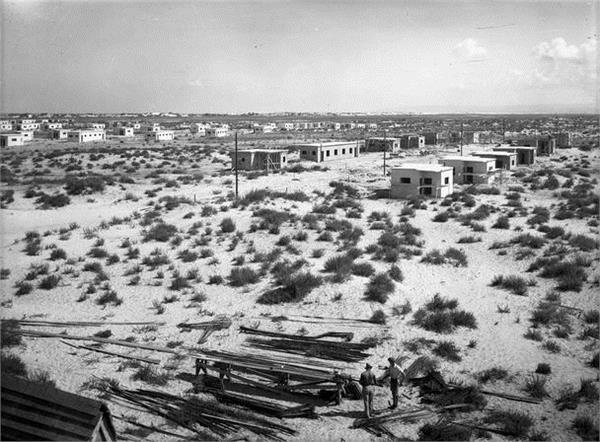
Kiryat Haim in 1929

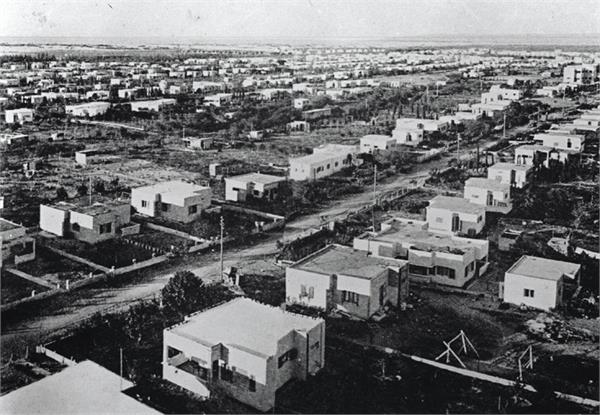
Kiryat Haim in 1930

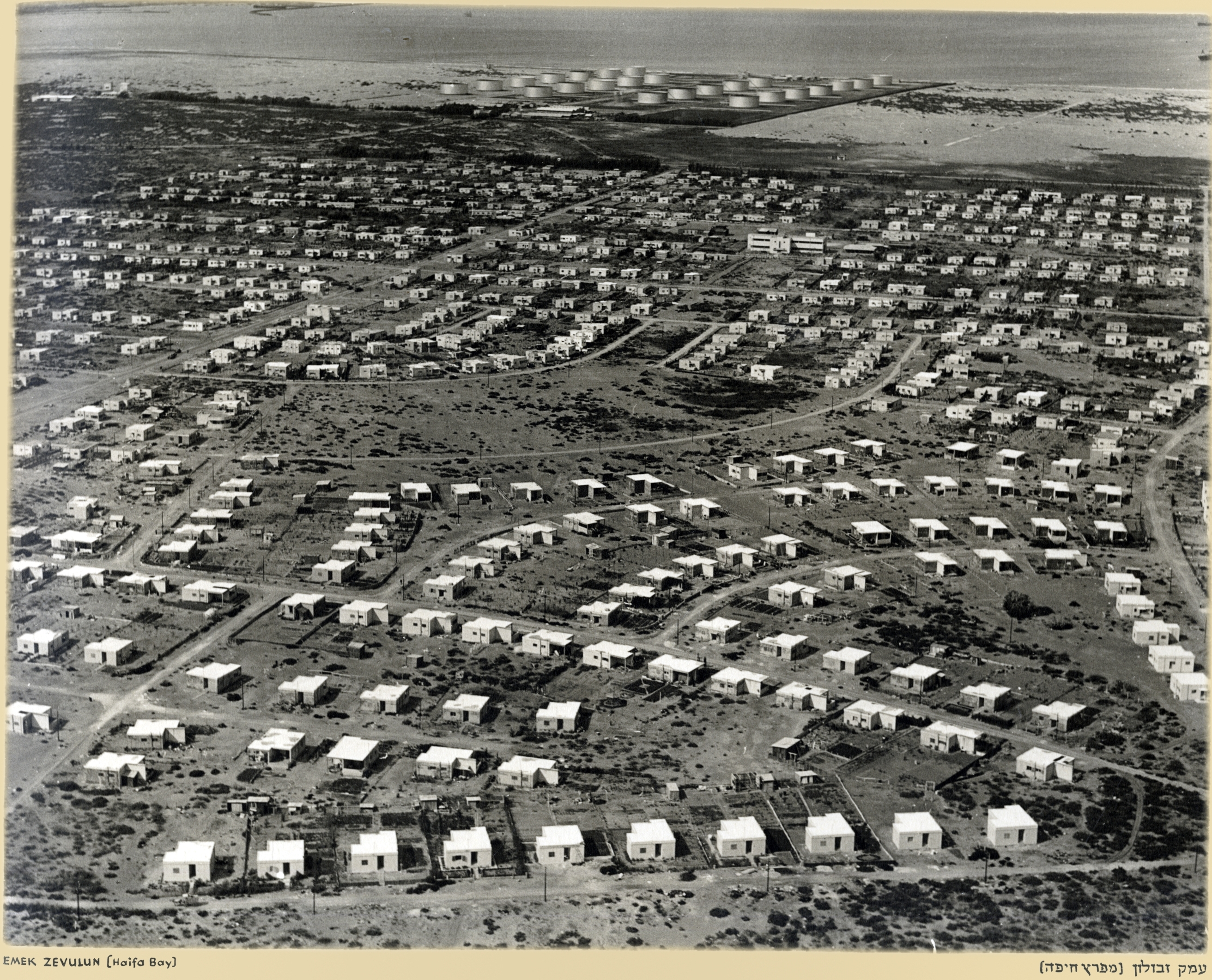
Kiryat Haim, aerial photo by Zoltan Kluger, 1937-1938

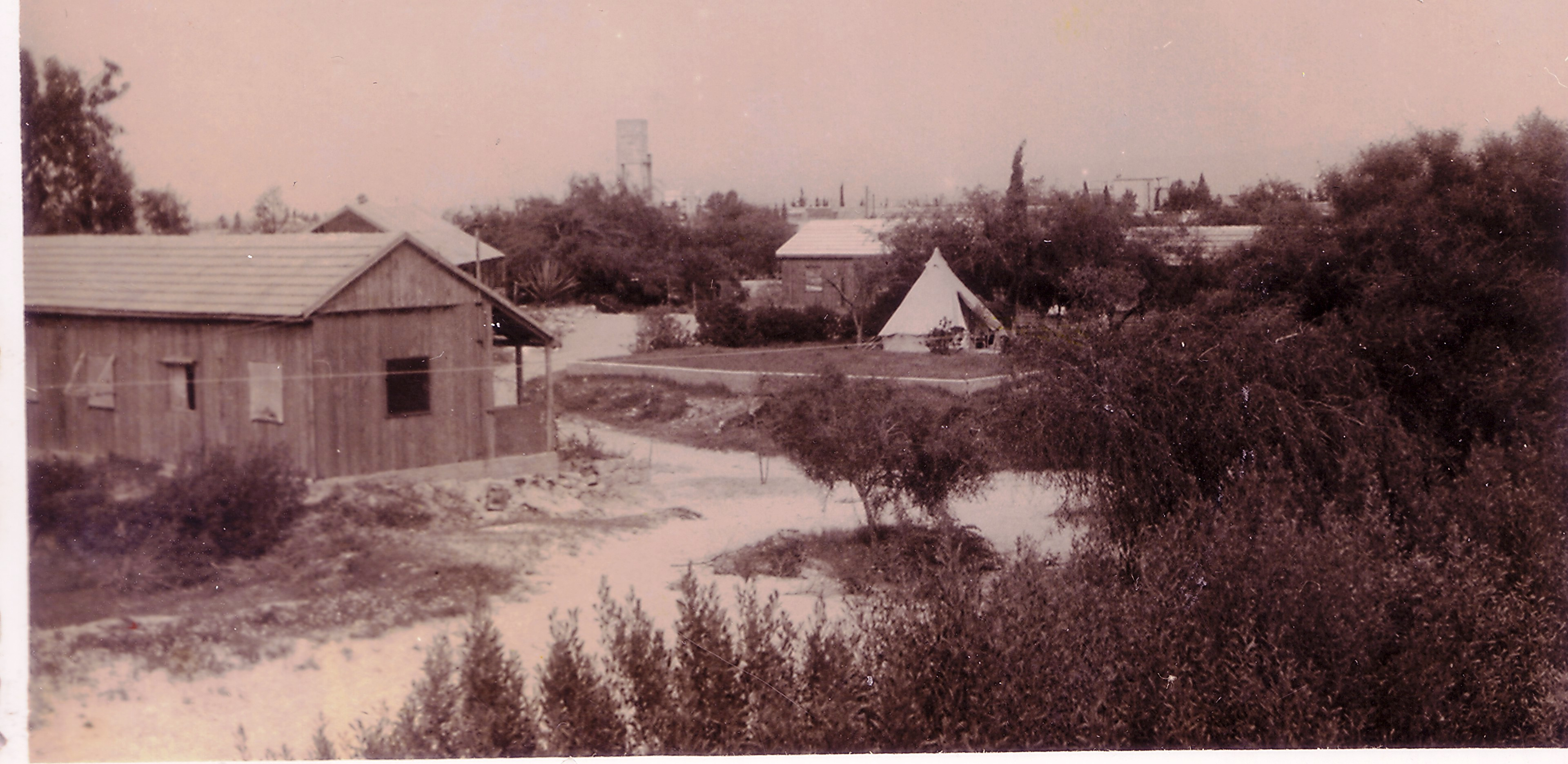
Kibbutz Mishmar Zevulun in Kiryat Haim, 1942

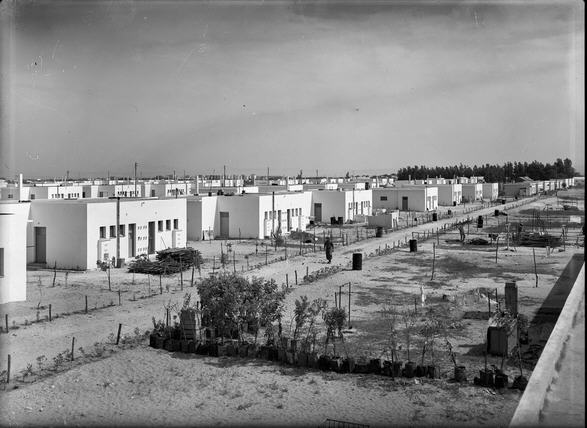
Kiryat Haim, 1946

=== Administrative structure, development ===
Administratively, Kiryat Haim is divided into two parts, Kiryat Haim West and Kiryat Haim East. Kiryat Haim West is located on the western side of the railway line between that and Kiryat Haim beach.

Kiryat Haim East was expanded to later and is located on the eastern side of railway. The housing initially consisted of low-density single-family housing, with a number of public housing projects located at edge of the neighbourhood. In later decades, some of this has been replaced by higher-density developments and apartment buildings. Kiryat Haim East hosts the commercial "heart" of the suburb, with a number of shops, restaurants and a supermarket located along Achi Eilat Street, the suburb's main thoroughfare.

==== Coastal promenade ====
As part of its coastal development plan, the Haifa Economic Corporation built the Kiryat Haim Promenade, named for Israeli minister of the environment Yehudit Naot.

== Demographics ==
Kiryat Haim absorbed large numbers of immigrants from the former Soviet Union who arrived in the 1990s. The suburb also has a large population of Ethiopian Israelis.

== Sports ==
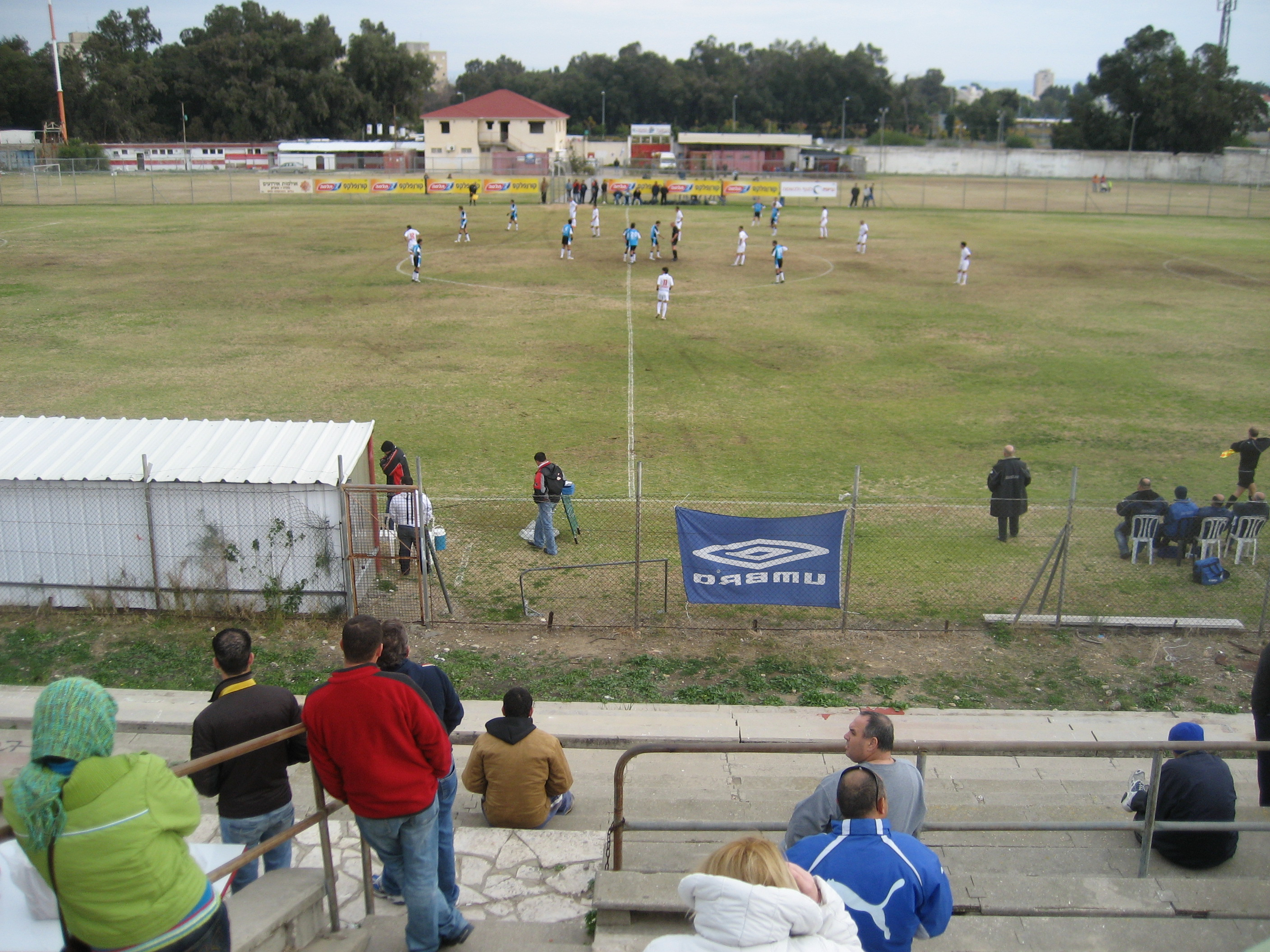
A soccer match at Kiryat Haim Stadium

Thomas D'Alesandro Stadium, sometimes referred to simply as Kiryat Haim Stadium, is a multi-purpose stadium in Kiryat Haim used mainly for football matches. It was originally the home of Hapoel Haifa and Maccabi Haifa until Kiryat Eliezer Stadium was built. It was named for Baltimore mayor Thomas D'Alesandro.

Kiryat Haim is home to a handball team, Maccabi Hakiryatim.

== Transportation ==
Kiryat Haim is served by the Kiryat Haim railway station, which is on the main Coastal railway line to Nahariya, with southerly trains to Beersheba and Modi'in.

Three Egged bus lines route through Kiryat Haim, route 13 that travels between Kiryat Ata and Kiryat Yam, route 15 that routes via the western half of Kiryat Haim from the Krayot central bus station in the north of Kiryat Motzkin to Hutzot HaMifratz, and route 26 that travels between Kiryat Ata and Kiryat Haim beach.

At night, Kiryat Haim is served by night bus 210, which runs a meandering route through the Krayot with terminuses in Kiryat Ata and Kiryat Bialik.

== Notable residents ==
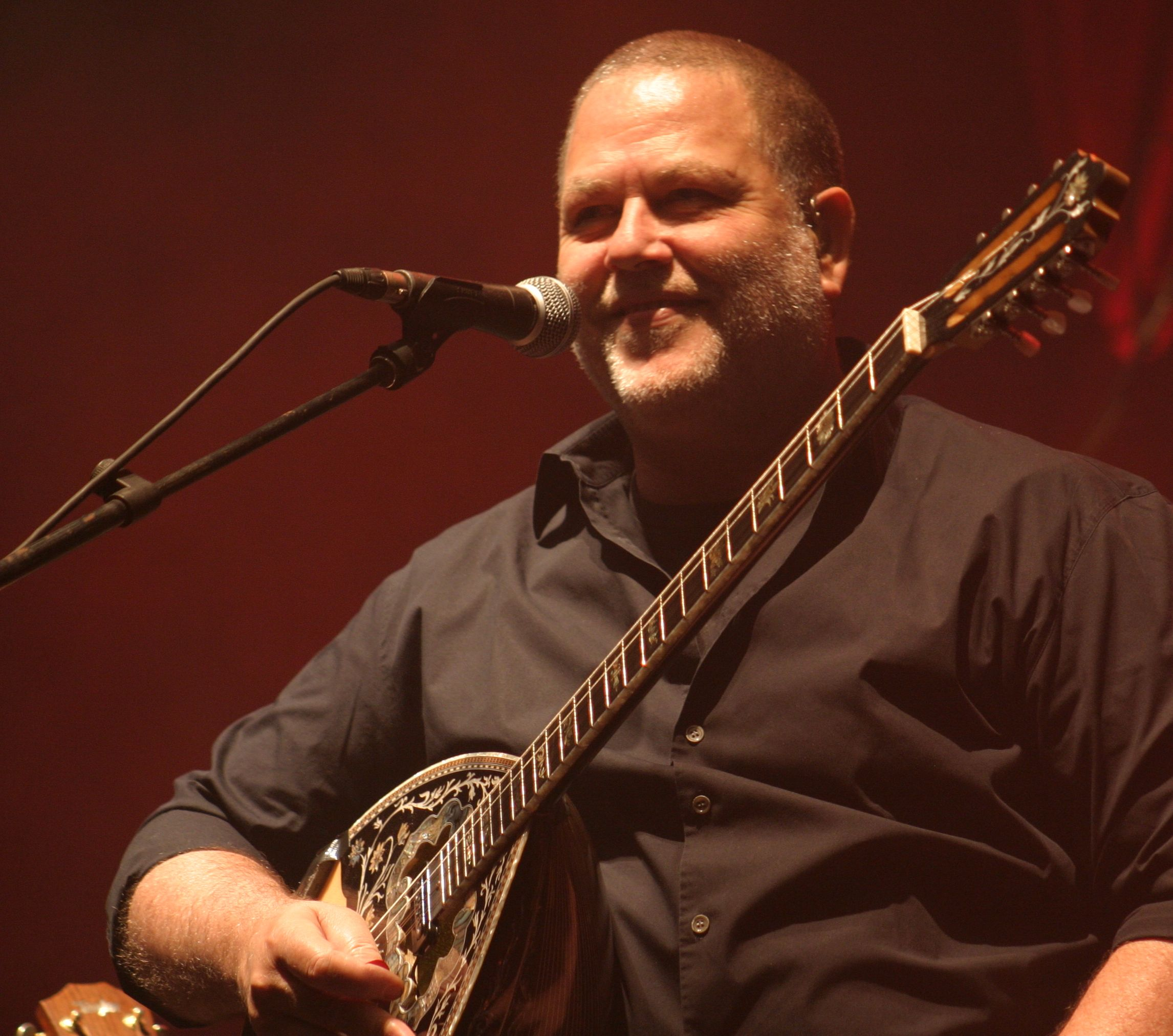
Yehuda Poliker

- Moshe Ya'alon, Former minister of defense and chief of joint staff
- Rotem Sela, actress, model and television presenter
- Yehuda Poliker, (born 1950), Israeli singer, songwriter, musician, and painter
- Tal Banin, soccer player and coach
- Shiri Maimon, singer
- Dan Tichon, politician
