= Kiryat Motzkin railway station =

Railway station in Israel

Kiryat Motzkin קריית מוצקין
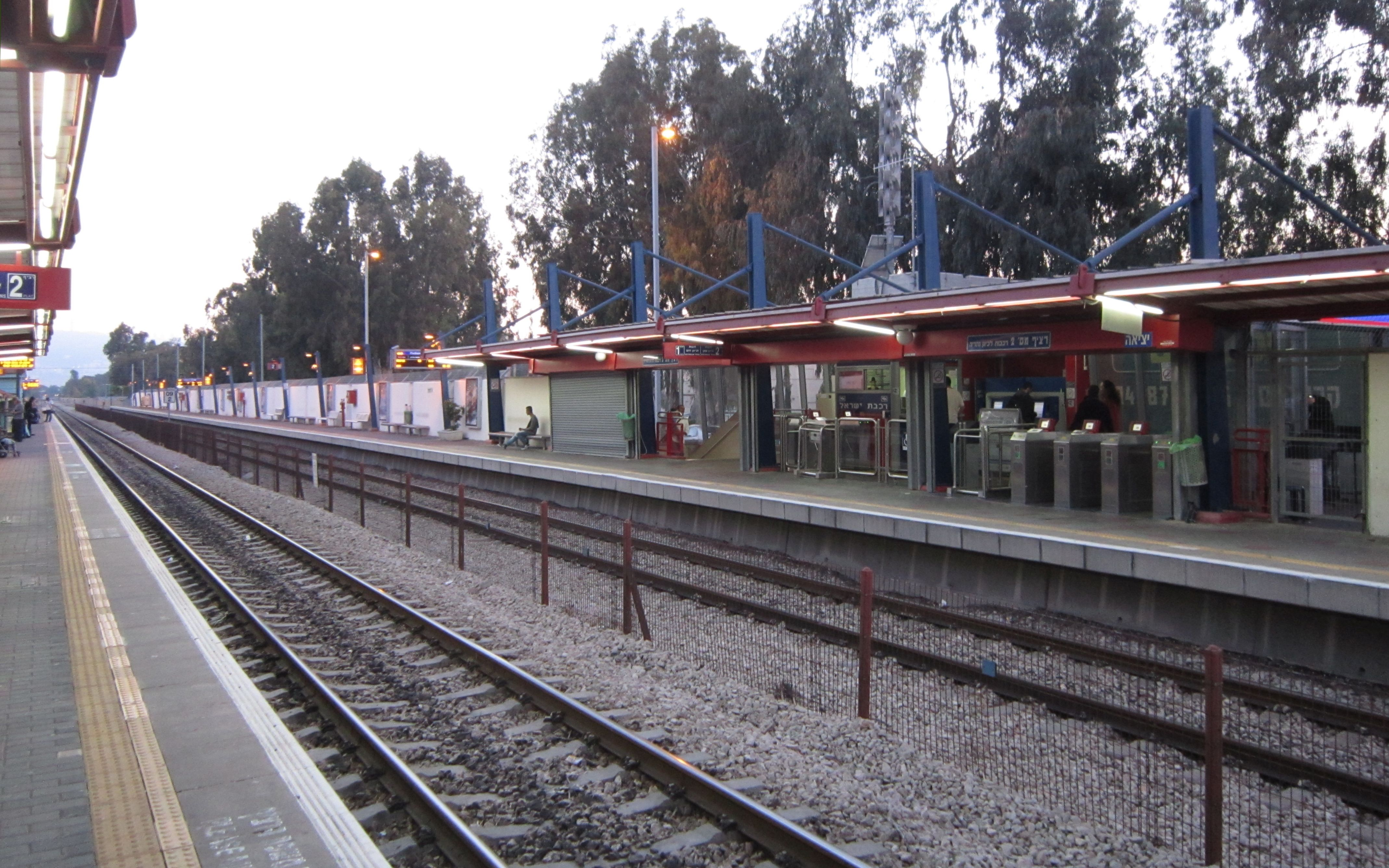
- The two platforms

General information
- Location: Between Bar-Ilan St. & INS Eilat St. Israel
- Coordinates: 32°49′59″N 35°04′12″E
- Platforms: 2
- Tracks: 2

Construction
- Parking: 300 free spaces
- Cycle facilities: 30 spaces
- Accessible: Yes

History
- Opened: 1937; 89 years ago
- Rebuilt: early 1990s

Passengers
- 2019: 2,376,278
- Rank: 19 out of 68
Location

Kiryat Motzkin railway station (Hebrew: תחנת הרכבת קרית מוצקין, Takhanat HaRakevet Kiryat Motzkin) is an Israel Railways passenger station serving the city of Kiryat Motzkin and the surrounding Kerayot region.

== Location ==
The station is situated on the Coastal railway line. The station is located on Issakhar Street (Hebrew: רחוב יששכר, Rekhov Yissakhar) in the western part of the city, on the municipal border with Haifa's neighborhood of Kiryat Shmuel. The station is one of two railway stations serving Haifa's northern suburbs – the Krayot (the other being Kiryat Haim railway station), although Kiryat Motzkin is larger in terms of passenger numbers and trains serving it.

== History ==
The present-day station stands on the spot of a halt on the Jezreel Valley railway, constructed by the Ottoman Empire in 1903–1904. In 1937, as part of converting the old narrow-gauge Ottoman railway to standard gauge, the British Mandate for Palestine constructed the station building at this location. During the Second World War, the British extended the railway north of Acre to Beirut and Tripoli, thereby placing Kiryat Motzkin railway station on the busy Beirut to Cairo line. This was Kiryat Motzkin's only means of transport to and from the surrounding areas, especially the city of Haifa.

The old British station building is preserved, and is currently used as a warehouse. The new building was constructed next to it in the early 1990s, according to the present passenger station format of Israel Railways. In the late 1990s, a tunnel was constructed just north of the station, replacing the dangerous level crossing that existed in its place.

During the 2006 Israel–Lebanon conflict train service to the station was suspended after a Hezbollah Katyusha rocket hit a train depot in Haifa on July 16, 2006, killing eight Israel Railways workers. It was restored 29 days later, on August 14, two days after the ceasefire went into effect.

In the 2010s the station was renovated at a cost of ILS 40 million, finishing in early 2018.

== Design ==
The station consists of two side platforms with two parallel rail tracks running between them. The small station building is located on the east platform (Kiryat Motzkin exit) as well as an exit on the west side (Kiryat Shmuel exit). A pedestrian tunnel connects the two platforms beneath the tracks.

Platform 1 (the eastern one) is used by southbound trains while platform 2 (the western one) by northbound trains.

== Train service ==
Kiryat Motzkin railway station is a station on both the main north–south coastal line of Israel Railways (Nahariya – Haifa – Tel Aviv – Ben-Gurion Airport – Lod – Be'er Sheva Inter-City service) and the suburban line serving Haifa's northern suburbs – the Kerayot (Haifa - Kiryat Motzkin suburban service). The station is situated between Akko (Acre) railway station to the north and Kiryat Haim railway station to the south.

For many years the station served as the northern end of the double-track section of the Coastal Railway main line (which is why many of the Haifa area suburban service trains made Kiryat Motzkin their final stop). However, works to complete the double tracking of the coastal railway to Akko were completed in 2012 and to Nahariya in 2013. Following this, many of the trains on the suburban service now terminate in Akko or Nahariya instead.

Timetable highlights:

- Inter-City service:
  - On weekdays the station is served by 36 southbound and 35 northbound trains. The first train departs at 01:18 and the last train arrives at 01:15.
  - On Fridays and holiday eves the station is served by 22 southbound and 22 northbound trains. First train departs at 01:18 and last train arrives at 15:18.
  - On Saturdays and holiday the station is served by 6 southbound and 5 northbound trains. First train departs at 19:04 and last train arrives at 22:56.
- Suburban service:
  - On weekdays the station is served by 14 southbound and 13 northbound suburban trains to and from Haifa. First train departs at 06:14 and last train arrives at 19:20.
  - On Fridays and holiday eves the station is served by one northbound train.

Preceding station	Israel Railways	Following station
Acre towards Nahariya	Nahariya–Modi'in	Kiryat Haim towards Modi'in–Center
Acre towards Nahariya	Nahariya–Beersheba	HaMifratz Central towards Be'er Sheva–Center
Acre towards Nahariya	Night Train Nahariya–Ben Gurion Airport	Haifa Center–HaShmona towards Ben Gurion Airport
Ahihud towards Karmiel	Karmiel–Beersheba	HaMifratz Central towards Be'er Sheva–Center
Ahihud towards Karmiel	Karmiel–Haifa	Kiryat Haim towards Haifa–Hof HaCarmel

== Station layout ==
Platform numbers increase in an East-to-West direction

Side platform
Platform 1	Nahariya–Modi'in trains toward Modi'in–Center (Kiryat Haim) → Nahariya–Beersheba and Karmiel–Beersheba trains toward Be'er Sheva–Center (HaMifratz Central) → Karmiel–Haifa trains toward Haifa–Hof HaCarmel (Kiryat Haim) →
Platform 2	← Nahariya–Modi'in and Nahariya–Beersheba trains toward Nahariya (Acre) ← Karmiel–Beersheba and Karmiel–Haifa trains toward Karmiel (Ahihud)
Side platform

== Ridership ==
Passengers boarding and disembarking by year
Year	Passengers	Rank	Source
2020	844,709 (▼1,531,569)	20 of 68 (▼1)	2020 Freedom of Information Law Annual Report
2019	2,376,278	19 of 68	2019 Freedom of Information Law Annual Report

== Public transport connections ==
Kiryat Motzkin railway station is located about a kilometer to the west of the main highway ( Highway 4) and thus is out of walking distance from a large number of bus lines. Two Egged bus lines have a stop on the street outside the station, both running at about 20 minute intervals:

- 22: Kiryat Motzkin–Kiryat Ata
- 23: Kiryat Yam–railway station–Kiryat Ata

In addition, Sherut (share taxi is called "Tapuzit") line 3 (circular inside the Krayot) stops at the station.
