= Hutzot HaMifratz railway station =

Israel Railways passenger station

Coordinates: 32°48′34.19″N 35°3′16.35″E

Hutzot HaMifratz חוצות המפרץ
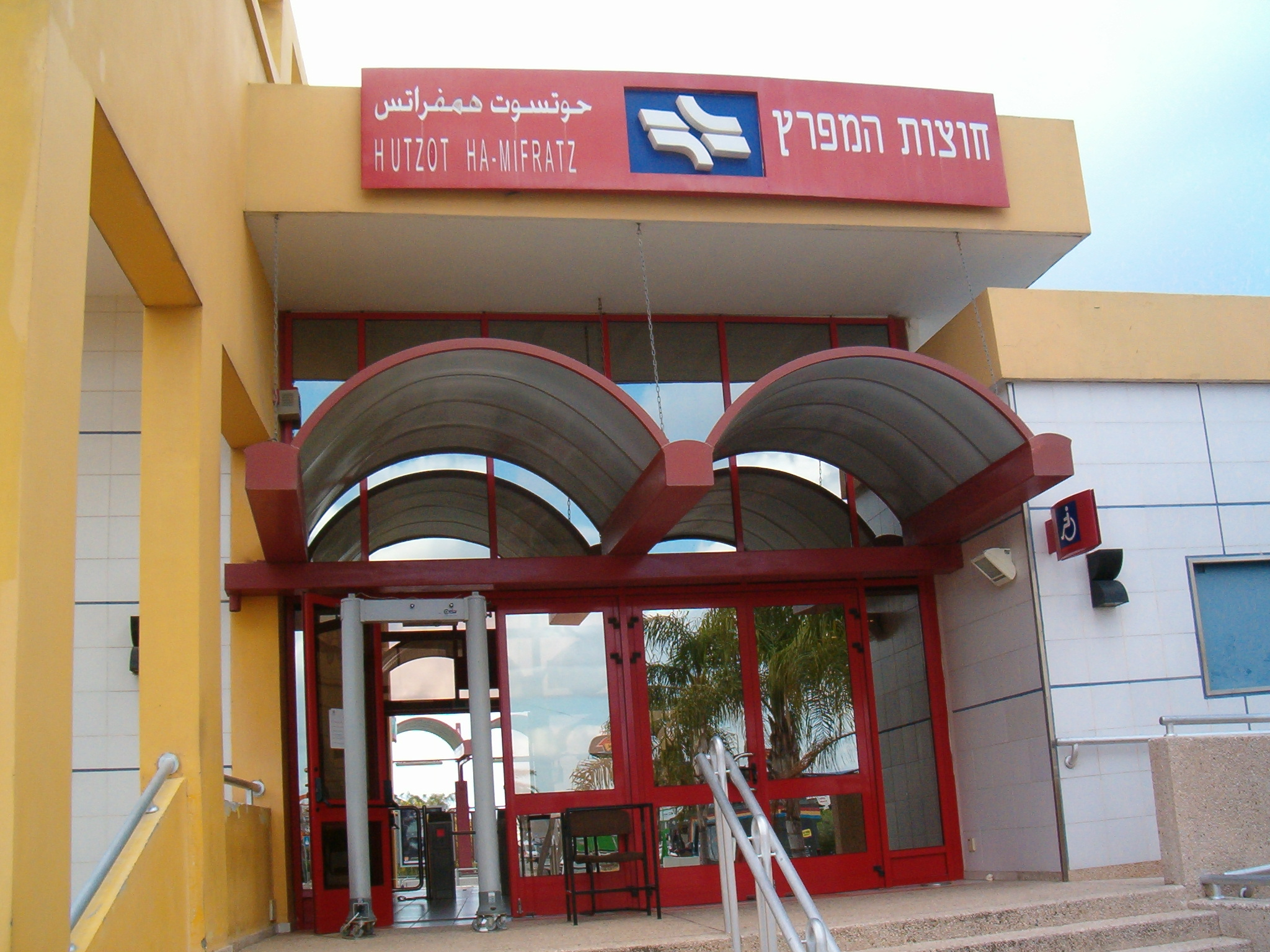

General information
- Location: HaHaroshet St., Haifa; Israel
- Platforms: 2
- Tracks: 2

Construction
- Parking: 300 free spaces
- Cycle facilities: 15 spaces
- Accessible: Yes

History
- Opened: 2001; 25 years ago

Passengers
- 2019: 626,017
- Rank: 49 out of 68
Location

Hutzot HaMifratz railway station (Hebrew: תחנת הרכבת חוצות המפרץ, Taḥanat HaRakevet Ḥutzot HaMifratz) is an Israel Railways passenger station serving Hutzot HaMifratz Mall (Hebrew: קניון חוצות המפרץ), Israel's largest open-air mall, and the surrounding Haifa Bay industrial zone in the north of Haifa.

== Location ==
The station is on the north–south coastal line and is located in the central part of the Haifa-Bay industrial zone. The station is one of two railway stations serving the Haifa Bay district (the other being HaMifratz Central railway station), although it is much smaller in terms of passenger numbers and trains serving it. The station is one of six railway stations within Haifa's municipal borders.

== History ==
The station was constructed during the summer of 2001 and officially opened on October 16, 2001. This is the second public railway station whose construction was entirely funded by a private enterprise (the first being HaMifrats Central station). The station replaced the temporary Kishon station that existed for several years some 700 meters to the north. The station consists of two side platforms with two parallel rail tracks running between them, a pedestrian tunnel connecting the two platforms and a station hall on the eastern side.

During the 2006 Israel–Lebanon conflict train service to the station was suspended after a Hezbollah Katyusha rocket hit a train depot in Haifa on July 16, 2006, killing 8 Israel Railways workers. It was restored 29 days later, on August 14, two days after the ceasefire went into effect.

== Train service ==
Hutzot HaMifratz is a station on both the main north–south coastal line of Israel Railways (Nahariya–Haifa–Tel Aviv–Ben-Gurion Airport–Be'er Sheva Inter-City Service) and the suburban line serving Haifa's northern suburbs – The Qrayot (Haifa–Qiryat Motzkin Suburban Service), although only a third of all the Inter-City trains actually stop at the station. The station is situated between Qiryat Chaim railway station to the north and HaMifrats Central railway station to the south.

Preceding station	Israel Railways	Following station
Kiryat Haim towards Nahariya	Nahariya–Modi'in	HaMifratz Central towards Modi'in–Center
Kiryat Haim towards Karmiel	Karmiel–Haifa	HaMifratz Central towards Haifa–Hof HaCarmel

== Station layout ==
Platform numbers increase in an East-to-West direction

Side platform
Platform 1	Nahariya–Modi'in trains toward Modi'in–Center (HaMifratz Central) → Nahariya–Beersheba and Karmiel–Beersheba trains toward Be'er Sheva–Center do not stop here → Karmiel–Haifa trains toward Haifa–Hof HaCarmel (HaMifratz Central) →
Platform 2	← Nahariya–Modi'in trains toward Nahariya (Kiryat Haim) ← Nahariya–Beersheba trains toward Nahariya do not stop here ← Karmiel–Beersheba trains toward Karmiel do not stop here ← Karmiel–Haifa trains toward Karmiel (Kiryat Haim)
Side platform

== Ridership ==
Passengers boarding and disembarking by year
Year	Passengers	Rank	Source
2020	245,094 (▼380,923)	46 of 68 (▲3)	2020 Freedom of Information Law Annual Report
2019	626,017	49 of 68	2019 Freedom of Information Law Annual Report

== Public transport connections ==
Hutzot HaMifratz station is located about 400 meters to the north-west of the main highway ( Highway 4) and thus is within walking distance from a large number of bus lines and Sherut Taxis (Share Taxi).
