= Ahihud railway station =

Railway station in Israel

Coordinates: 32.911631°N 35.174494°E

Ahihud אחיהוד
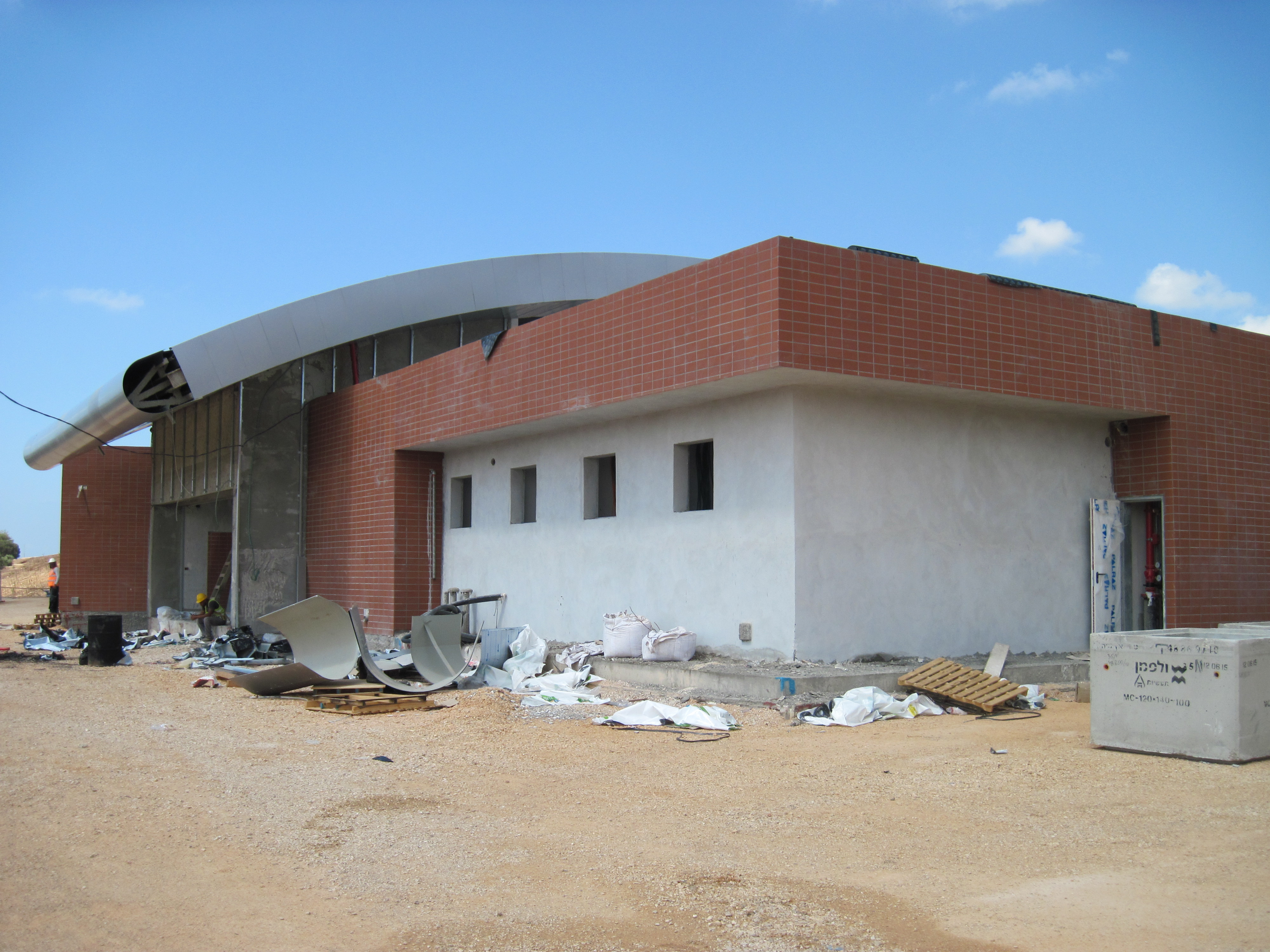
- The station building before completion

General information
- Location: Ahihud; Israel
- Operator: Israel Railways
- Line: Railway to Karmiel

History
- Opened: 20 September 2017

Passengers
- 2019: 276,018
- Rank: 61 out of 68
Location

Ahihud railway station is a railway station in Ahihud, Israel. It is operated by Israel Railways and is located of the Karmiel line between Kiryat Motzkin and Karmiel. The station (as well as the whole Karmiel line) was opened on 20 September 2017.

| Preceding station | Israel Railways | Following station |
|---|---|---|
| Karmiel Terminus | Karmiel–Beersheba | Kiryat Motzkin towards Be'er Sheva–Center |
| Karmiel Terminus | Karmiel–Haifa | Kiryat Motzkin towards Haifa–Hof HaCarmel |
