= Acre railway station =

Railway station in Israel

Coordinates: 32.928148°N 35.082822°E

Akko עכו
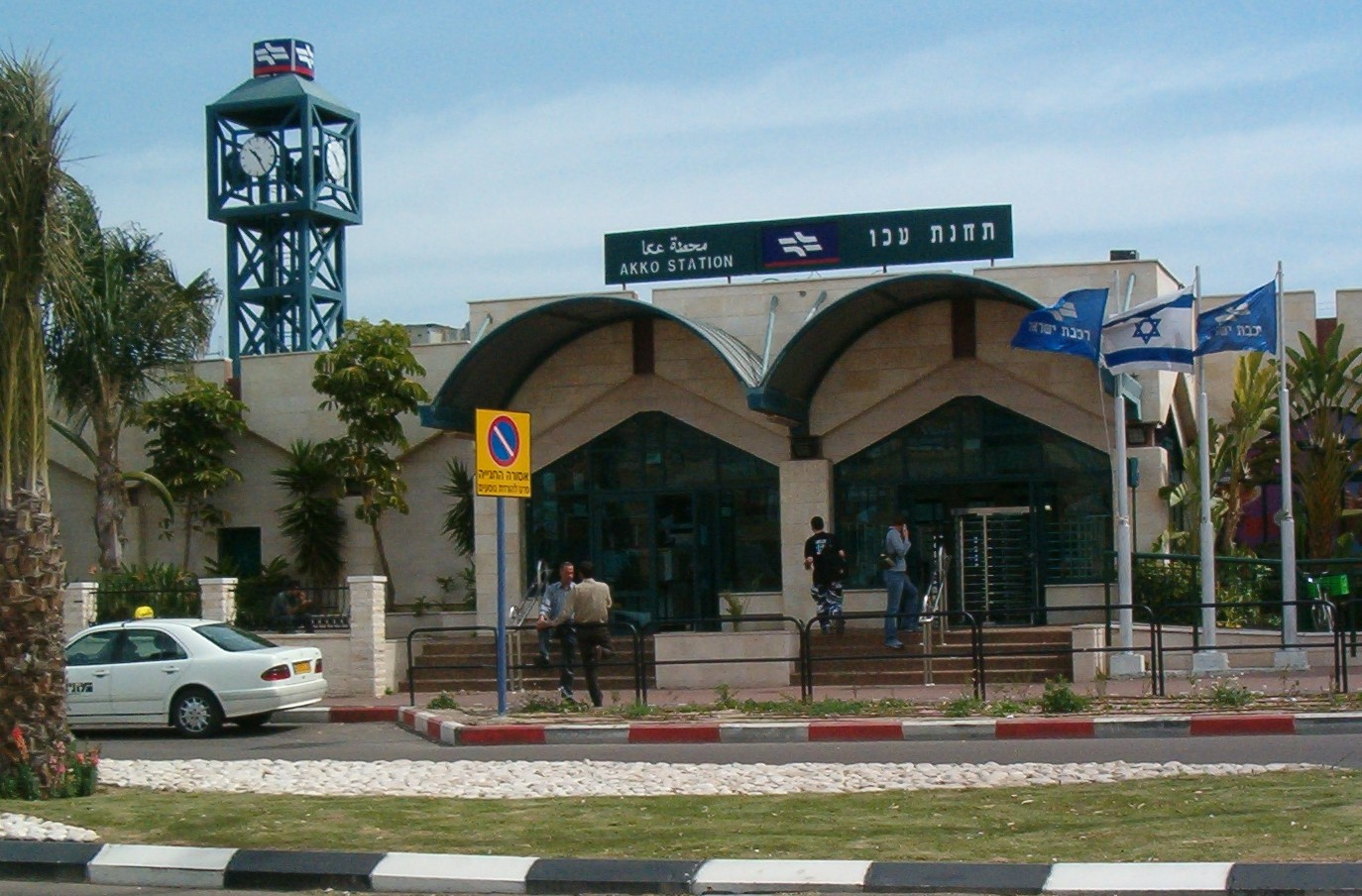
- Acre Railway Station

General information
- Location: David Remez St., Akko; Israel
- Platforms: 3
- Tracks: 3

Construction
- Parking: 300 free spaces
- Cycle facilities: 4 spaces
- Accessible: Yes

History
- Opened: 1950s
- Rebuilt: 2002

Passengers
- 2019: 2,043,343
- Rank: 25 out of 68
Location

Acre railway station (Hebrew: תחנת הרכבת עכו, Taḥanat HaRakevet Ako) is an Israel Railways passenger station serving the city of Acre (Akko) and the surrounding towns and villages.

== Location ==
The station is situated on the North-South coastal line. The station is located on David Remez Street (Hebrew: רחוב רמז, Reḥov Remez) in the eastern part of the city, across the road from the city market and a short walking distance from the central bus station .

== History ==
The original Acre station was constructed by the Ottoman Empire in 1912–1913, as part of the extension to Jezreel Valley railway which branched off in Balad al-Sheikh (present-day Nesher). This branch line was destroyed during the First World War, and restored afterwards by the British Mandate for Palestine. During the Second World War, the British extended the railway north of Acre to Beirut and Tripoli; but the old Acre Railway Station was left off the busy Beirut to Cairo line, and it was only served by the suburban services to Haifa and Krayot.

The present-day station was constructed in the early 1950s at the location of the halt on the Beirut-Cairo railway. The location of the original Ottoman two-storey station building is since 1954 occupied by the Acre School for Naval Officers. The building itself was demolished in mid-1960s.

The station underwent a complete reconstruction from the summer of 2001 until the spring of 2002, which included the update to the present passenger station format of Israel Railways, as well as the erection of an island platform (housing platforms 2 and 3), a modern station hall and a tunnel connecting the two platforms. The official inauguration of the new station hall was on 21 May 2002.

Train service to the station was completely suspended on 13 July 2006, the day after the 2006 Israel-Lebanon conflict began, due to the Hezbollah rocket attacks on Acre. It was restored 32 days later, on 14 August, two days after the ceasefire went into effect.

== Design ==
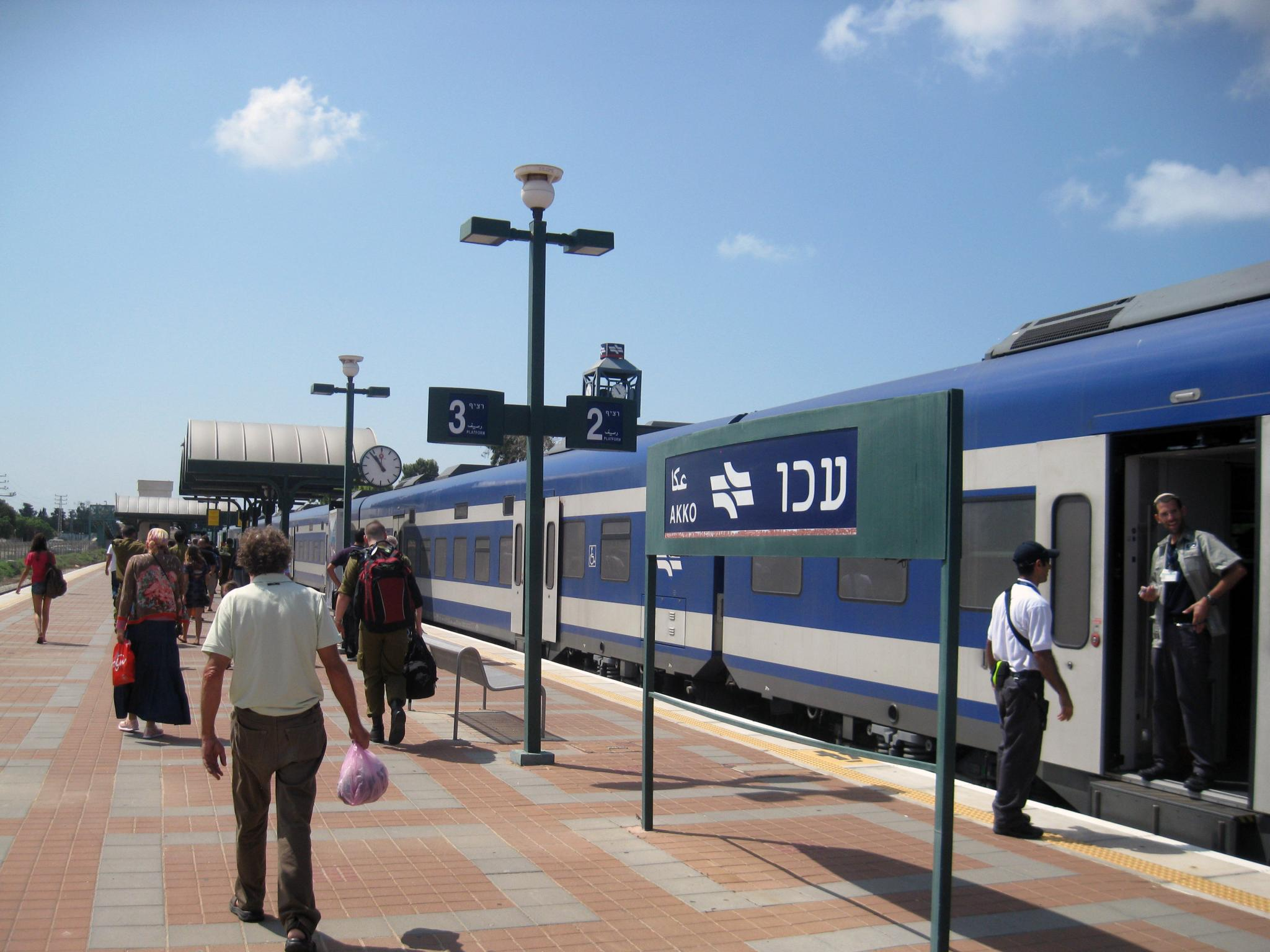
Train stopped at platform 2

The station consists of a side platform on the west (housing platform 1) and an island platform on the east (housing platforms 2 and 3) as well as two parallel rail tracks running between the side platform and the island platform and a third rail track running east of the island platform. The station hall is located on the west platform and a pedestrian tunnel connects the two platforms beneath the tracks.

Platform 1 is used for northbound trains, platform 2 for southbound trains and platform 3 is used for trains beginning or ending their journey at the station.

== Train service ==
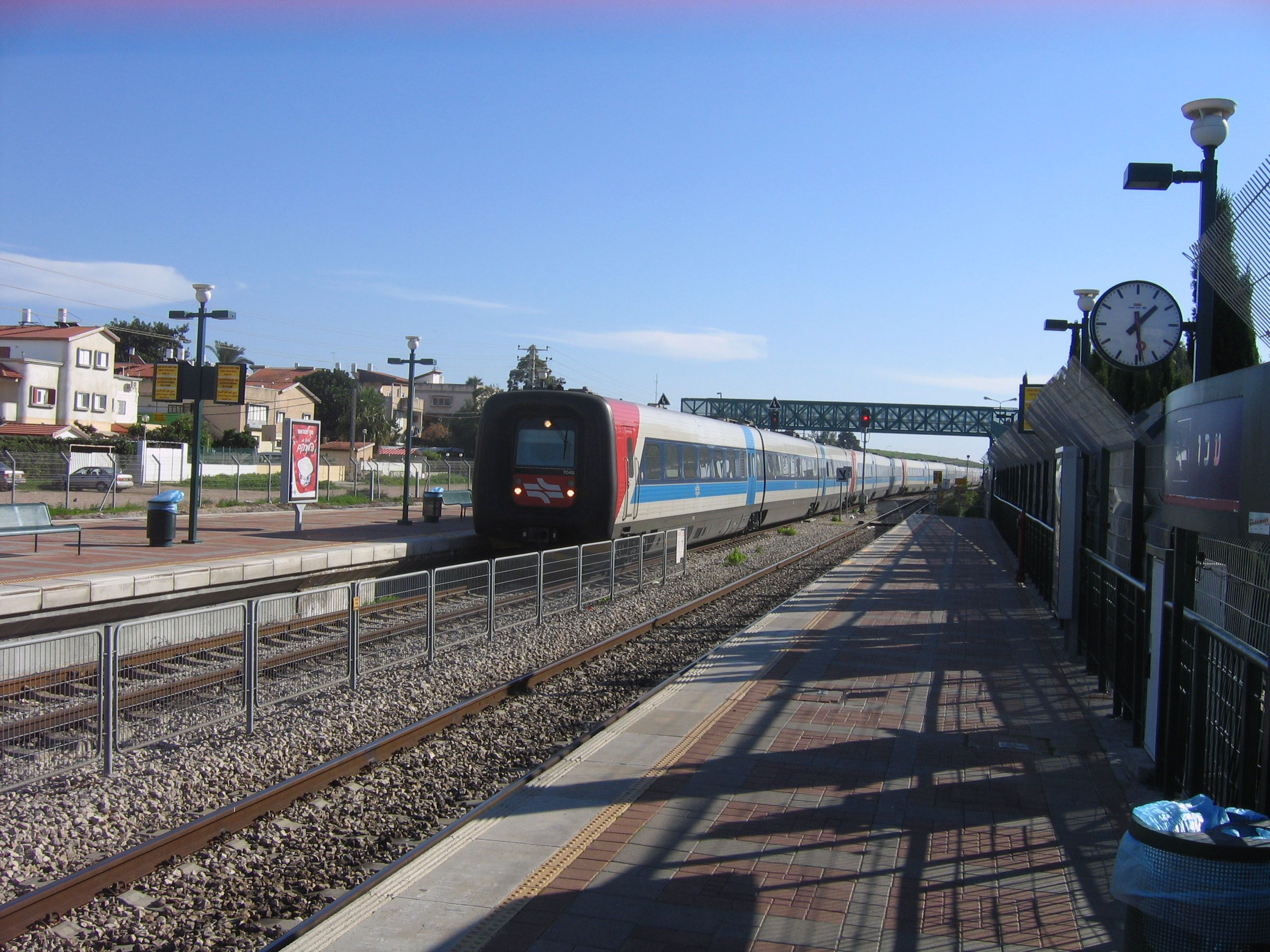
A southbound IC3 DMU approaching platform 2 – photographed from platform 1

Acre Railway Station is a station on the main north–south coastal line of Israel Railways (Nahariya – Haifa – Tel Aviv – Ben-Gurion International Airport – Beersheba Inter-City Service). The station is situated between Nahariya Railway Station to the north and Kiryat Motzkin Railway Station to the south.

Timetable highlights:

- On weekdays the station is served by 32 southbound and 30 northbound Inter-City trains. First train departs at 01:09 and last train arrives at 01:26.
- On Fridays and holiday eves the station is served by 22 southbound and 20 northbound trains. First train departs at 01:09 and last train arrives at 15:00.
- On Saturdays and holiday the station is served by 6 southbound and 5 northbound trains. First train departs at 18:53 and last train arrives at 23:07.

Preceding station	Israel Railways	Following station
Nahariya Terminus	Nahariya–Modi'in	Kiryat Motzkin towards Modi'in–Center
Nahariya Terminus	Nahariya–Beersheba	Kiryat Motzkin towards Be'er Sheva–Center
Nahariya Terminus	Night Train Nahariya–Ben Gurion Airport	Kiryat Motzkin towards Ben Gurion Airport

== Station layout ==
Platform numbers increase in a West-to-East direction

Side platform
Platform 1	Nahariya–Modi'in and Nahariya–Beersheba trains toward Nahariya (terminus) →
Platform 2	← Nahariya–Modi'in trains toward Modi'in–Center (Kiryat Motzkin) ← Nahariya–Beersheba trains toward Be'er Sheva–Center (Kiryat Motzkin)
Island platform
Platform 3	← Termination track – not in ordinary use →

== Ridership ==
Passengers boarding and disembarking by year
Year	Passengers	Rank	Source
2020	732,180 (▼1,311,163)	23 of 68 (▲2)	2020 Freedom of Information Law Annual Report
2019	2,043,343	25 of 68	2019 Freedom of Information Law Annual Report

== Public transport connections ==
Acre Railway Station is located a short walking distance from Acre's central bus station, thus passenger can reach the station from almost every part of the region. A number of Inter-City and local buses stop just in front of the station, providing even better connection to the railway station.

Sherut Taxis (share taxis) stop on the street, just outside the station.

== Facilities ==
- Payphone
- Ticket cashier
- Ticket machine
- Buffet
- Parking lot
- Toilet
- Taxi station
