= Ahihud =

Moshav in northern Israel

Ahihud: אֲחִיהוּד (Hebrew)
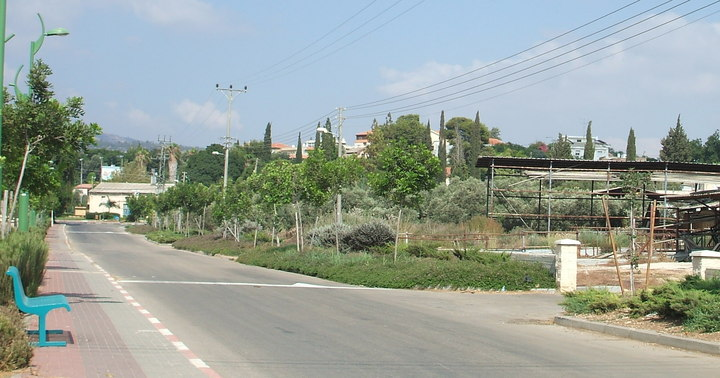

- Location within Northwest Israel Location within Israel
- Coordinates: 32°54′28″N 35°10′20″E
- Country: Israel
- District: Northern
- Subdistrict: Acre
- Council: Mateh Asher
- Region: Western Galilee
- Affiliation: Moshavim Movement
- Founded: 1950
- Founder: Yemenite Jews
- Population (2024): 1,150

Ahihud (Hebrew: אֲחִיהוּד) is a moshav in the Western Galilee in northern Israel, about 9 km east of Acre. It was founded in 1950, settled by Jewish refugees from Yemen. It belongs to the Moshavim Movement and falls within the jurisdiction of the Mateh Asher Regional Council. The name of Ahihud is taken from a Biblical verse: "The leader of the tribe of Asher was Ahihud, son of Shlomi" (Numbers 34:27).

After sources of water enabling the establishment of permanent settlements were discovered in the region, kibbutz Yasur was founded. Its area is 1,800 dunams, and most of its residents are descendants of Yemenite Jewish refugees.

== History ==
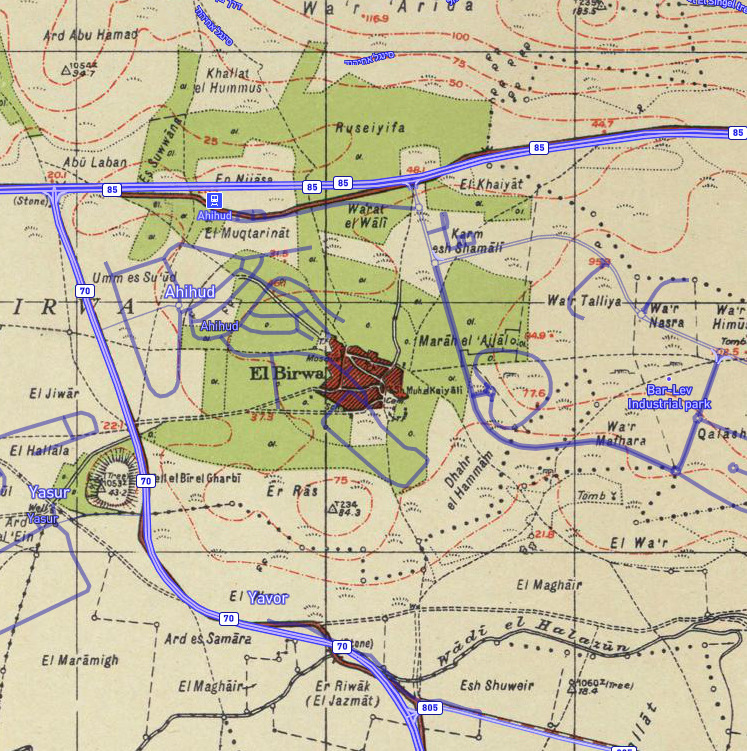
The modern area of Ahihud, shown in blue, overlaid on the 1940s Survey of Palestine map of al-Birwa

The moshav was established on land located near the depopulated Palestinian village of al-Birwa. Conder and Kitchener thought that al-Birwa preserves in its name the more ancient name of Beri (Hebrew: בירי), mentioned in the Jerusalem Talmud (Pesahim iv.1 [26a]), seeing that both it and Kabul are mentioned together. According to Josephus, the villages in the immediate vicinity of Kabul were pillaged and burnt during the First Jewish revolt against Rome. A train station was opened in 2017.

== Archaeology ==
In 2008 a large Byzantine-era oil refinery was discovered on the outskirts on the moshav. Among the artifacts recovered during excavations were roof tiles, a marble colonnette, fragments of a marble chancel screen, stem lamps, a carved plate with a figure carrying a child and a bronze lamp chain. These items indicate that a church may have been located nearby and the olive press was situated inside a Byzantine monastery. An archaeological excavation of the site was conducted in 2010 and in 2014 by Rafeh Abu-Rya, on behalf of the Israel Antiquities Authority (IAA).
