= Nahariya railway station =

Railway station in Israel

Nahariya נהריה
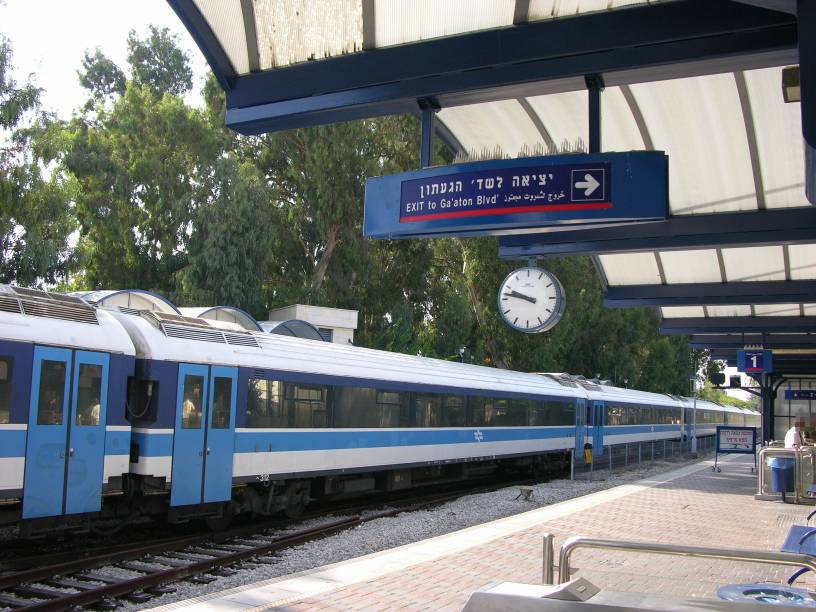

General information
- Location: 2 HaGaaton Blvd, Nahariya; Israel
- Coordinates: 33°00′19″N 35°05′56″E
- Platforms: 2
- Tracks: 3
- Connections: Central Bus Station

Construction
- Structure type: At-grade
- Parking: 50 pay spaces
- Cycle facilities: 12 spaces
- Accessible: Yes

History
- Opened: 1 July 1945; 81 years ago
- Rebuilt: 2001, 2013; 13 years ago

Passengers
- 2019: 3,076,039
- Rank: 12 out of 68
Location

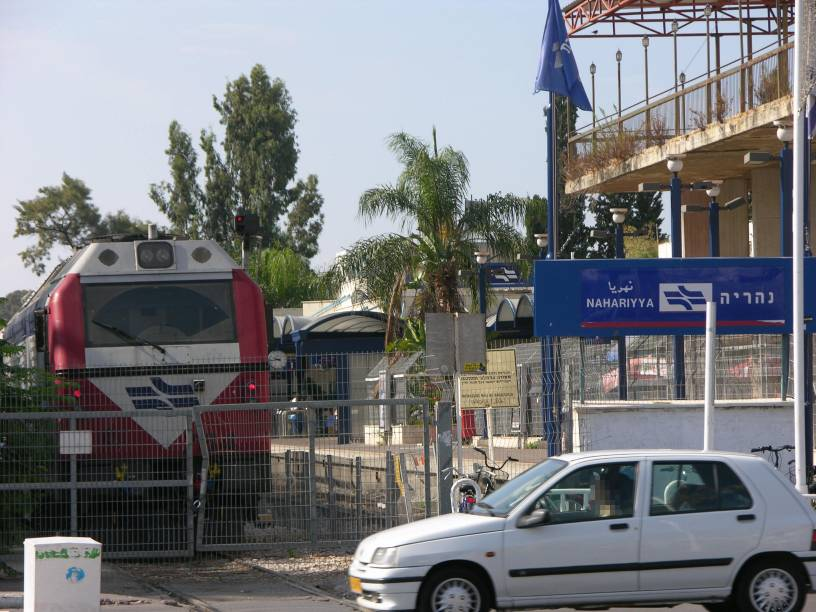
End of active tracks at Nahariya

Nahariya railway station (Hebrew: תחנת רכבת נהריה, romanized: Takhanat Rakevet Nahariya) is a railway station serving the city of Nahariya, Israel, and the surrounding towns and villages of the Western Galilee region. It is the northernmost passenger station in Israel and is the terminus of the north–south coastal line.

The station is located on Ga'aton Boulevard (Hebrew: שדרות הגעתון, romanized: Sderot HaGe'aton), Nahariya's main street along the Ga'aton River, near the main entrance to the city from the coastal highway ( Highway 4) and across the street from the city's central bus station.

== History ==
The first regular passenger service at the station began during the British Mandate of Palestine, on 1 July 1945. The station was then serving the Haifa–Beirut line. The service was then suspended during the 1948 Arab-Israeli War (1947–1949), and resumed in June 1950 with 2 daily passenger trains to Haifa and back. This passenger service was again discontinued two years later but was finally reinstated in 1958. The railway connection to Beirut via Rosh HaNikra was never resumed after the end of the British Mandate.

On 9 September 2001 the Nahariya Railway Station was the scene of a suicide bombing. The terror attack was executed, for the first time in the current conflict, by an Arab-Israeli who was sent by Hamas and detonated himself on the crowded platform, killing 3 Israelis and injuring 94.

Train service to the station was completely suspended, for the first time since 1952, on 13 July 2006, the day after the 2006 Israel-Lebanon conflict began, due to the Hezbollah rocket attacks on Nahariya. It was restored 33 days later, on 15 August 2006, a day after the ceasefire went into effect.

The station underwent a complete reconstruction in the summer of 2001, which included an update to the present passenger station format of Israel Railways as well as the erection of a second side platform, a modern station hall, and a pedestrian tunnel connecting the two platforms.

A follow-up upgrade which took place in 2013 added a third track in the eastern side of the station and converted and widened the far side platform to an island platform while also upgrading the station's other facilities. This work was carried out as part of the double tracking project of the Coastal Railway between Akko (Acre) and Nahariya (previously the last remaining single-track portion of Israel Railways' main line) and allows accommodating the increased train service to the station which started in the summer of 2014.

== Design ==
The station consists of three tracks with a side and island platforms and with a pedestrian tunnel connecting the two platforms beneath the rail tracks, while the station hall is located to the west of the rail tracks. Because the station is a terminus for all arriving trains there is no directional designation for the platforms.

== Train service ==
The Nahariya Railway Station is a station on the main north–south coastal line of Israel Railways and offers frequent train services on the Nahariya–Haifa–Tel-Aviv–Ben-Gurion Airport–Modi'in and Nahariya–Haifa–Tel-Aviv–Lod–Beersheba intercity lines, and the suburban service serving Haifa's northern suburbs (Haifa–The Qrayot–Akko (Acre)–Nahariya). It is open 24 hours a day except during the Sabbath.

Preceding station	Israel Railways	Following station
Terminus	Nahariya–Modi'in	Acre towards Modi'in–Center
Terminus	Nahariya–Beersheba	Acre towards Be'er Sheva–Center
Terminus	Night Train Nahariya–Ben Gurion Airport	Acre towards Ben Gurion Airport

== Station layout ==
Platform numbers increase in a West-to-East direction

Side platform
Platform 1	← Nahariya–Modi'in trains toward Modi'in–Center (Acre)
Platform 2	← Nahariya–Modi'in trains toward Modi'in–Center (Acre)
Island platform
Platform 3	← Nahariya–Beersheba trains toward Be'er Sheva–Center (Acre)

== Ridership ==
Passengers boarding and disembarking by year
Year	Passengers	Rank	Source
2020	1,241,173 (▼1,834,866)	10 of 68 (▲2)	2020 Freedom of Information Law Annual Report
2019	3,076,039	12 of 68	2019 Freedom of Information Law Annual Report

== Public transport connections ==
Nahariya Railway Station is well connected to all parts of the city and the region via Nahariya Central Bus Station, located just across the street. The central bus station also provides supplementary medium-distance bus service to destination reachable by train as well.

City bus services are operated by Nativ Express and include 8 bus lines which connect the railway station to every neighborhood in Nahariya. Regional bus services are also operated by Native Express and include 19 bus lines which reach many of the towns and villages in the region. Medium-distance bus services are provided by Egged, these lines are supplementary to the train service and provide a link to Akko, the Krayot and Haifa, as well as to the villages in between.

Sherut Taxis (share taxis) stop on the main highway ( Highway 4), just outside the station and also provide supplementary connection to Akko, the Krayot and Haifa.
