= Karmiel railway station =

Railway station in Israel

Coordinates: 32.92361°N 35.29861°E

Karmiel כרמיאל
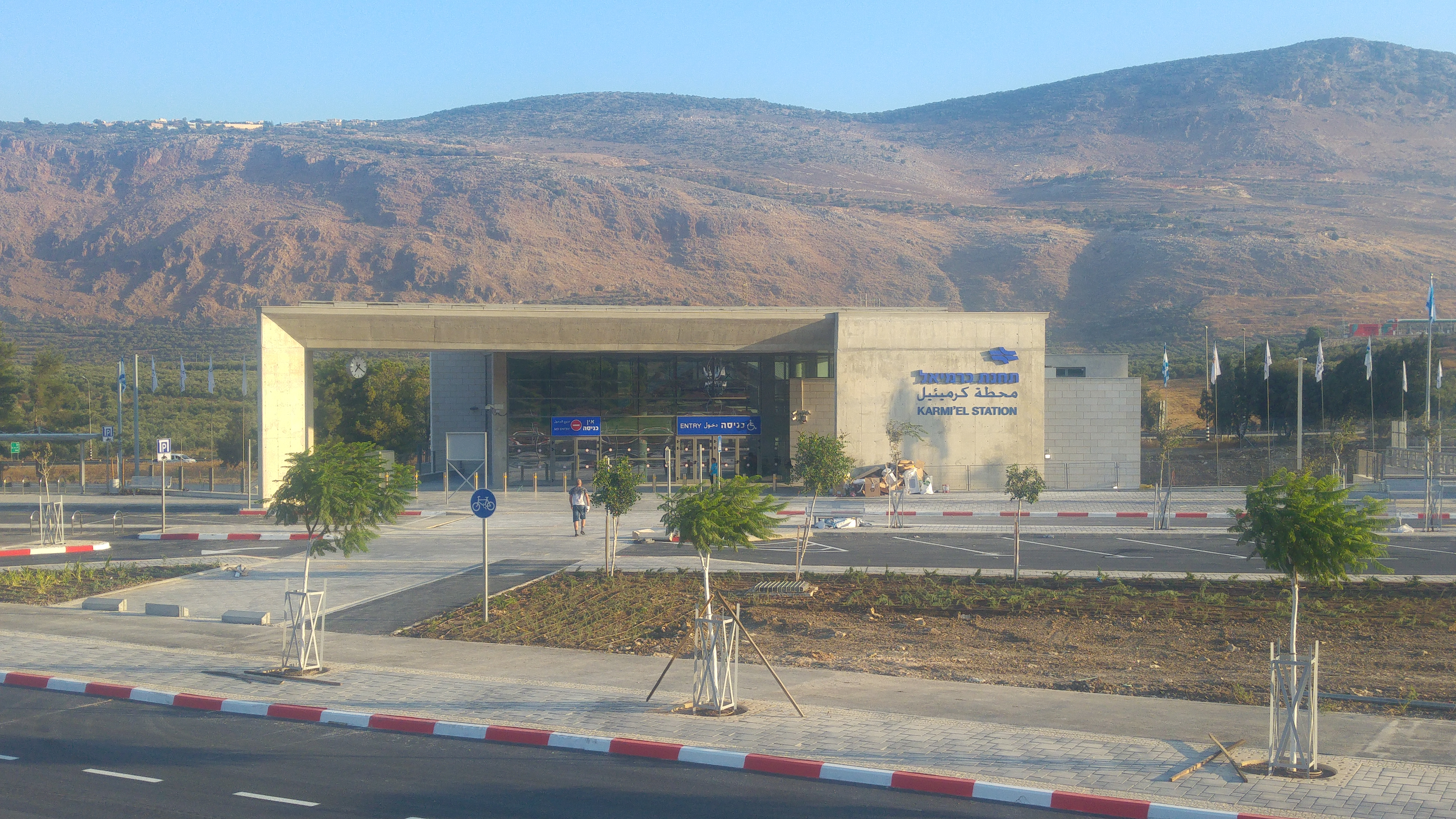
- The main entrance of Karmiel station in September 2017

General information
- Location: Karmiel; Israel
- Operator: Israel Railways
- Line: Railway to Karmiel

History
- Opened: 20 September 2017

Passengers
- 2019: 1,923,674
- Rank: 27 out of 68

Services
Preceding station	Israel Railways	Following station
Terminus	Karmiel–Beersheba	Ahihud towards Be'er Sheva–Center
Terminus	Karmiel–Haifa	Ahihud towards Haifa–Hof HaCarmel
Location

The Karmiel railway station (Hebrew: תחנת הרכבת כרמיאל Arabic: محطة قطار كرمئيل) is an Israel Railways passenger terminal in Karmiel, Israel. It is located at the eastern terminus of the Railway to Karmiel (which at its western end connects to the Coastal Railway at a point just south of Acre (Akko) – where it heads south towards Haifa). The next station to the west is Ahihud. The station (as well as the rest of the Karmiel line) was opened on 20 September 2017.

The station is located at the northern entrance to Karmiel, off of Highway 85, and is situated next to the Karmiel central bus station.

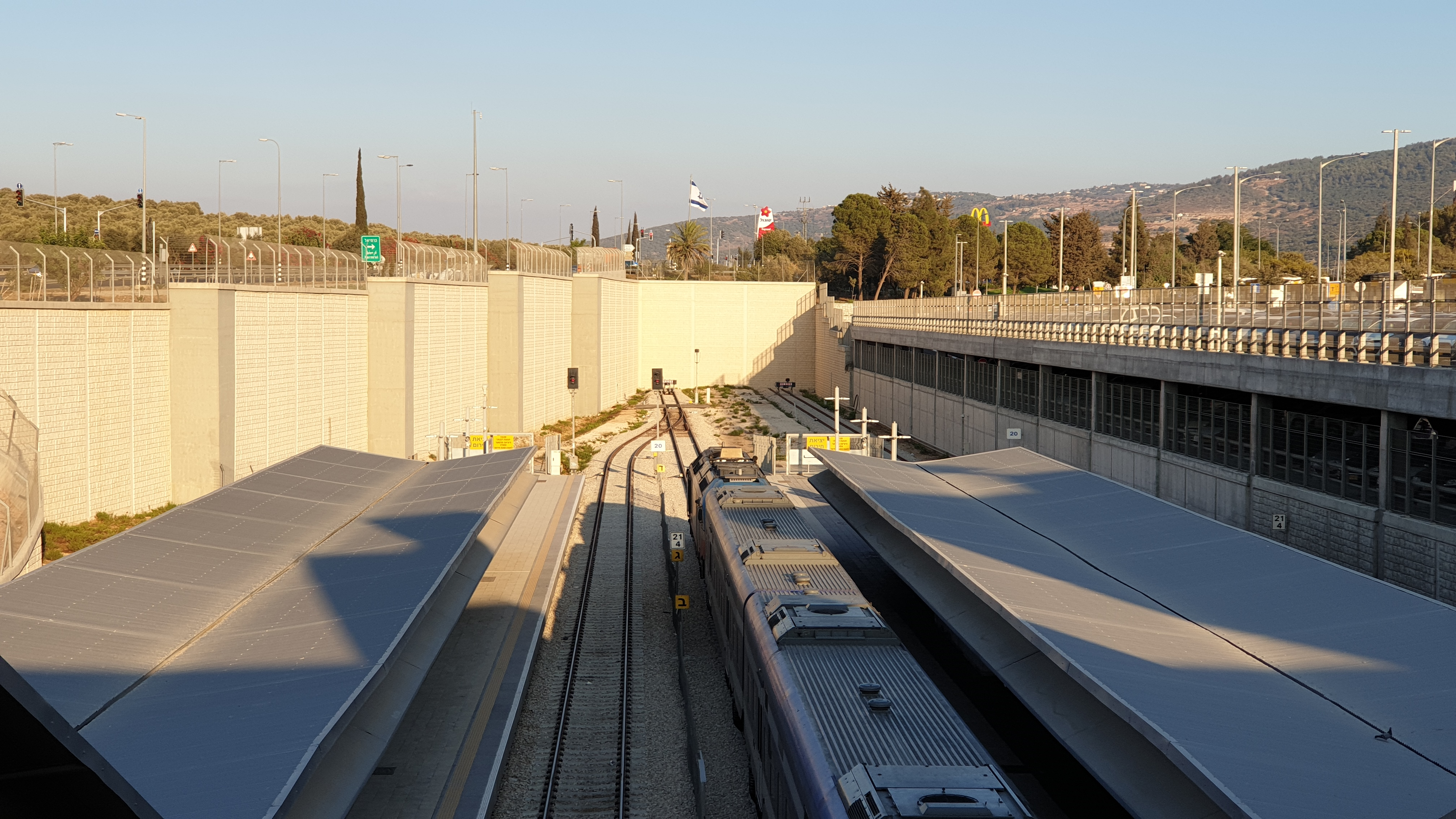
View of the tracks and platforms northbound in 2019

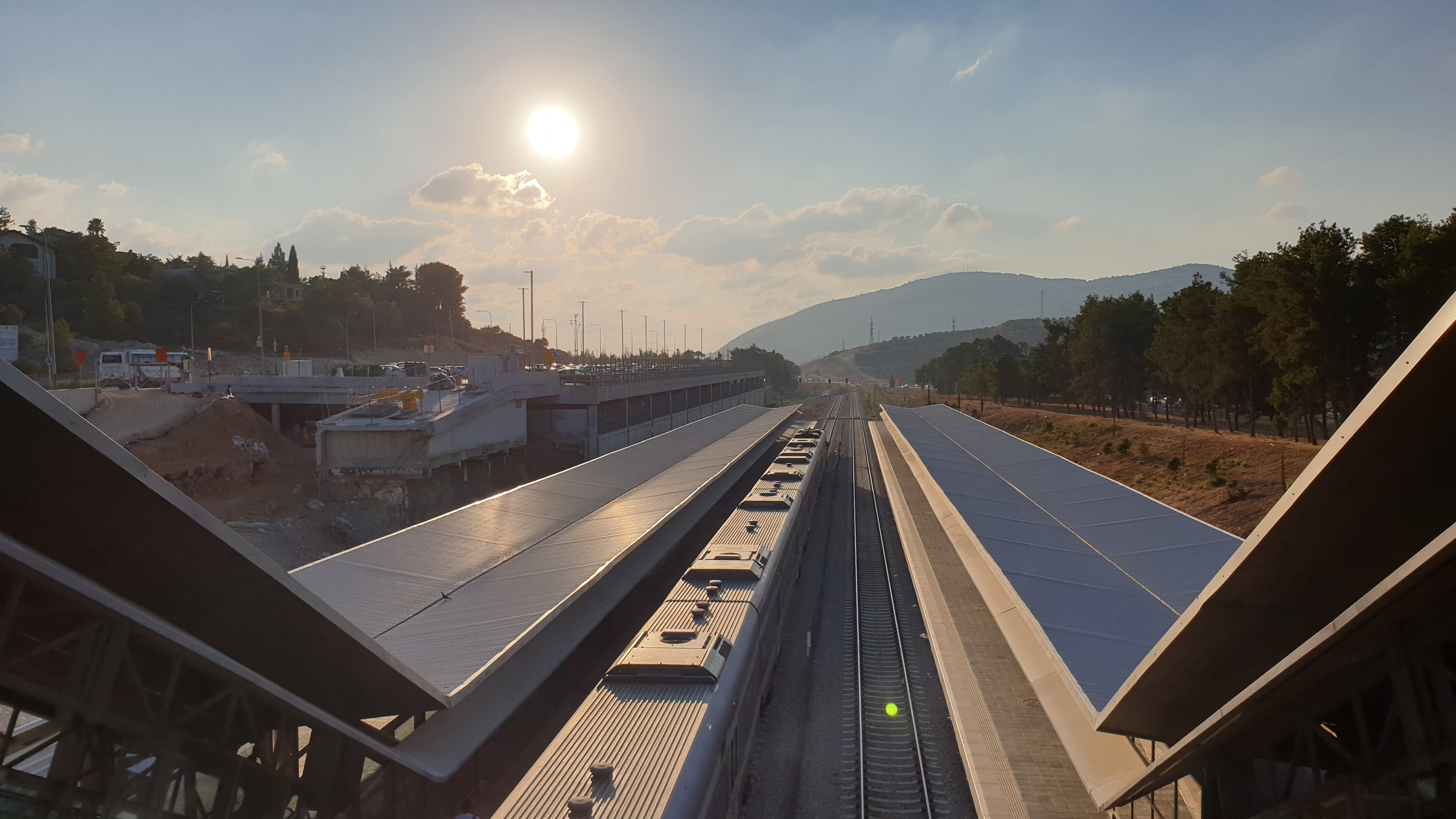
View of the tracks and platforms southbound in 2019
