= Coastal railway line, Israel =

Railway line in Israel

Coordinates: 32°33′46.74″N 34°55′57.23″E

Coastal railway line
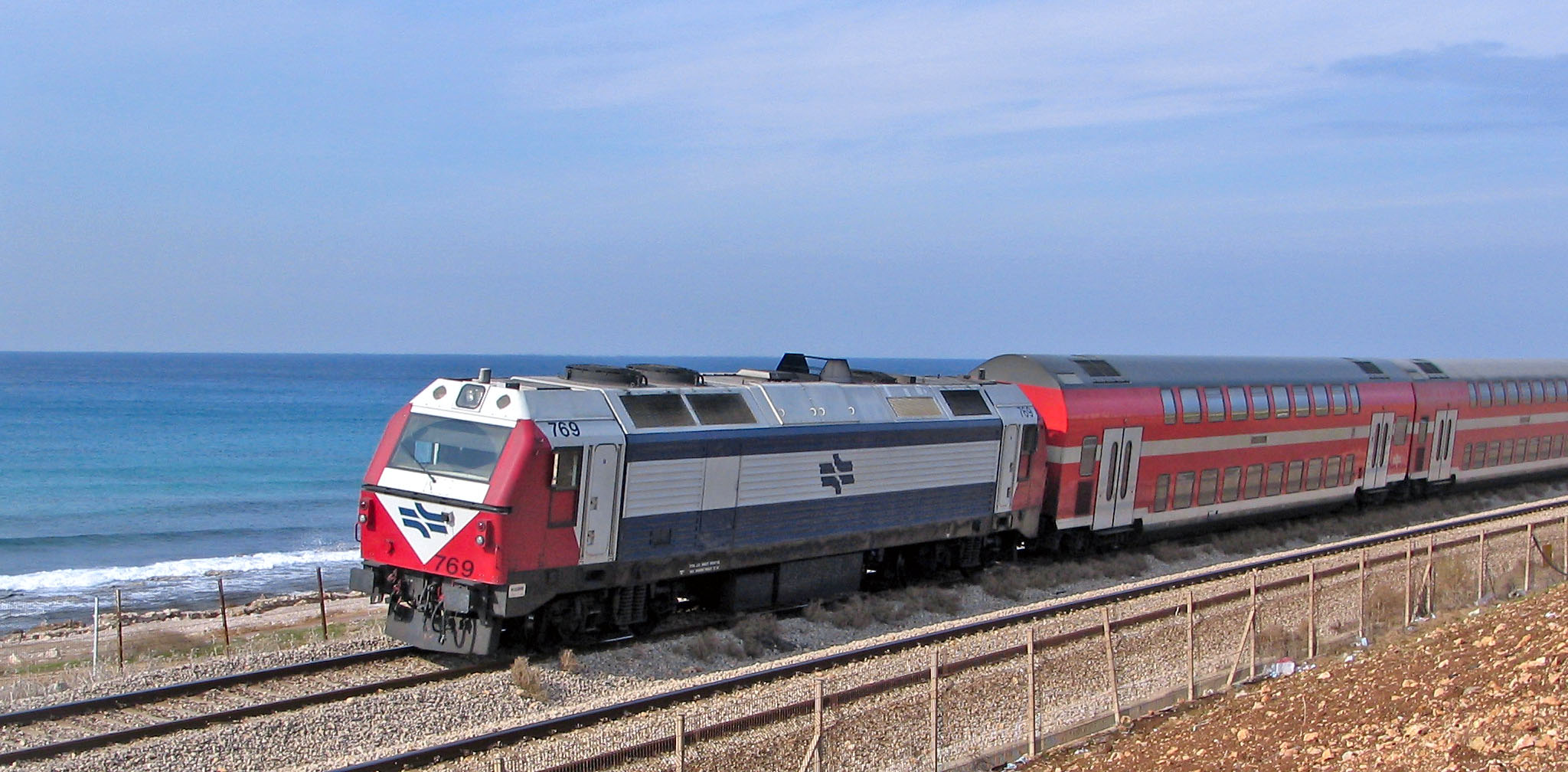
- A Double-decker train on the Coastal line south of Haifa in 2008

Overview
- Native name: מסילת החוף
- Status: Operating
- Locale: Israel

Service
- System: Israel Railways

Technical
- Num of tracks: 2 – 4
- Track gauge: 1,435 mm (4 ft 8 1/2 in) standard gauge
- Loading gauge: UIC GC
- Electrification: 25 kV AC, 50 Hz OCS
- Operating speed: 160 km/h (99 mph)

The Coastal railway line (Hebrew: מסילת החוף, romanized: mesilat ha-ḥof) is a mainline railway in Israel, which begins just south of the Lebanon-Israel border on the Mediterranean coast, near the town of Nahariya in Northern Israel and stretches almost the entire Mediterranean coast of the country, to just north of the border with the Gaza Strip in the south.

== History ==
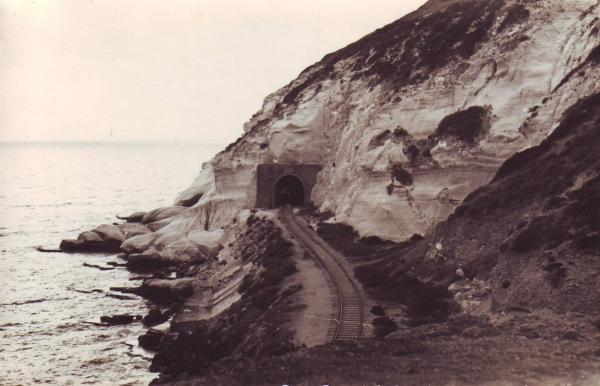
The former link to Lebanon through railway tunnels at Rosh HaNikra grottoes

The northern part of the coastal line from Acre (Akko) to Remez Junction (located south of today's Caesarea-Pardes Hanna Railway Station) was built by the British during the 1920s and operated by Palestine Railways. In 1941–42 engineers of the South African Army and New Zealand Army extended the line north to Beirut and Tripoli, Lebanon, through railway tunnels at Rosh HaNikra grottoes. Following the 1948 Arab–Israeli War the tunnel linking the line to Lebanon was blocked; it was subsequently stripped of its track, backfilled in its Lebanese side, and now forms a part of Rosh HaNikra national park where it hosts an audiovisual theater. It is unlikely that the tunnel will ever service a railway again; in addition to passing through what is now a nature reserve, it is insufficiently wide to service double-tracked lines. Israel Railway's internal plans foresee a new railway to Lebanon, branching off at the midpoint of the Acre-Karmiel railway in Ahihud, in the event of rail links being re-established.

The section south from Remez junction including its then-terminus, the Tel Aviv Central Railway Station, were built by Israel Railways in the beginning of the 1950s and the new line opened in May 1953 with Tel Aviv Central opening in November 1954. This new railroad then became the main north-south rail link between northern and central Israel, supplementing the older, more easterly/inland section which connected Remez junction and the nearby Hadera East Railway Station to the Lod Railway Station in central Israel that was constructed during the Ottoman period (and known today as the Eastern railway line, which was partially abandoned in 1969 and reopened in 2026). This new section of coastal railway from Remez junction linked the Tel Aviv Central Station and Haifa Central Railway Station and significantly shortened the travel time between the two cities as well as providing rail service to the cities of Herzliya and Netanya.

Little development of the line followed for the next forty years until 1988 when works started on extending the railway southwards from Tel Aviv Central along the Ayalon Highway. The new railway section, about 5 km in length, was opened in 1993 as the Ayalon Railway; passing through the heart of Tel Aviv, it quickly became the busiest railway line in Israel. It was the first railway line in Israel to be double-tracked from the outset, allowing up to 8 trains per hour in each direction; but even that proved insufficient, and by 2 November 2006, the entire section had been widened to triple-track, increasing the capacity to 14 trains per hour in each direction. A project has been approved to add a fourth track to the line, narrowing the conduit of Ayalon River to make room for the new track, and diverting the excess rainwater into specially-constructed reservoirs.

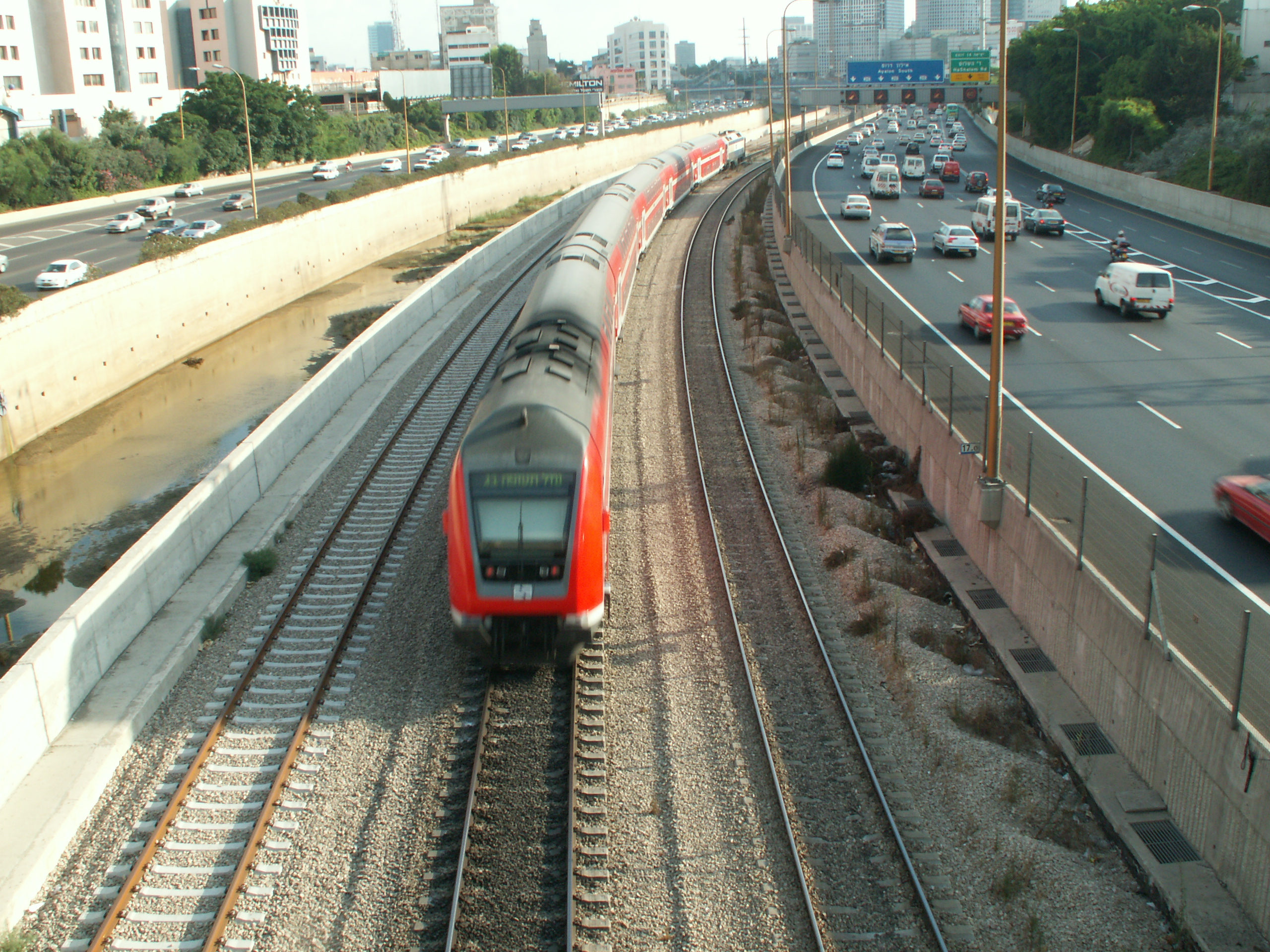
A train on the Ayalon Railway line in 2006

The opening of the Ayalon Railway, extending the Coastal Railway to connect with the Jaffa–Jerusalem railway, heralded a new era of railway development in the country as it allowed trains from the north to reach the south of the country through, rather than around, the nation's largest metropolis. Along this new railway section, two additional stations were built: Tel Aviv HaShalom opened in March 1996, and Tel Aviv HaHagana on 22 June 2002. During the construction of the Ayalon Highway, a provision was made for a third station between these two, at Yitzhak Sadeh bridge – although this station has yet to be built.

Over the years additional stations were built along the line, including Hadera West (1957), Haifa Hof HaCarmel (1999), Tel Aviv University (2000), Caesarea-Pardes Hanna (June 2001), Lev HaMifratz (Sep 2001) and Hutzot HaMifratz (Oct 2001).

A new section that includes six new stations along the South Ayalon Highway and Highway 4 was constructed in the early 2000s and connected the Coastal Railway with Ashdod Ad Halom railway station of the Lod–Ashkelon railway. The first phase of this work involved extending the coastal railway from the Tel Aviv HaHagana railway station to the new Rishon LeZion Moshe Dayan railway station, serving the southern Tel Aviv area suburbs and opening for service in September 2011. The remainder of the route to Ashdod opened in 2013, with the intermediate Yavne West railway station having opened in early 2012. This last section features a long cut-and-cover tunnel south of Yavne and a large flying junction at the intersection of the new coastal railway with the Lod–Ashkelon railway and the railway branch to the Port of Ashdod. From Ashdod, the existing railway from Lod extends south along the coast to near Yad Mordechai through Ashkelon (with a connection to the Heletz railway). From Yad Mordechai the new Ashkelon–Beersheba railway, completed in 2015, branches inland southeastwards through the northern Negev.

Beginning in the late 1980s, works started to double track the line in stages. These were finished in 2013 when double tracking works on the railway section between Akko and Nahariya were completed. Nowadays the line consists of at least double track throughout its entire length.

== Services ==
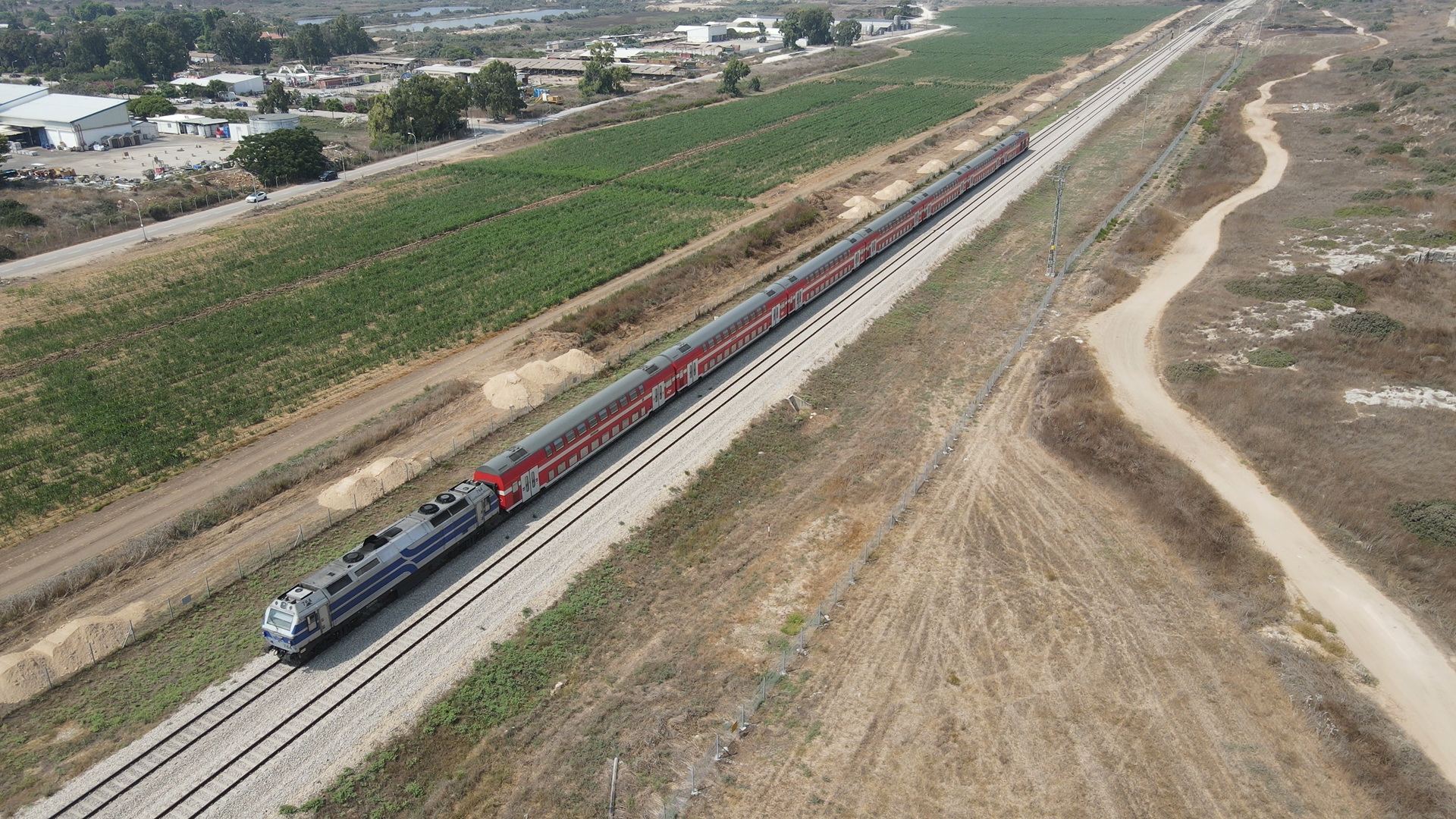
Passenger train heading north near Dor

Both intercity and suburban services operate on the line. The intercity service from Nahariya and Haifa to Tel Aviv and suburban services in both the Tel Aviv metropolitan area and the Haifa metropolitan area. Freight trains operate on the line as well.

The line is the busiest on the Israel Railways network, with the section along the Ayalon Highway the busiest on the line.

== Plans ==
=== Electrification ===
There are plans to electrify the entire line using an overhead 25 kV 50Hz AC system, though the Haifa municipality continues to oppose the plans due to aesthetic and public access reasons since the railway lies so close to the coastline within its borders.

Work on electrifying the Ayalon section between HaHagana and Herzliya, the busiest railway section in Israel and the first part of the Coastal Railway to be electrified started at HaHagana station in the fall of 2019 and reached Herzliya station in September 2020. Electrification between HaHagana and Ashkelon was completed in December 2021 and between Hertzliya and Netanya in September 2022. Electrification works between Netanya and Binyamina were completed in February 2023.

=== Widening ===
==== Hertzliya to Haifa ====
Since the 2000 decade, the section between Tel Aviv Central and Tel Aviv University stations consists of four tracks, while works to extend the four track section from University to Herzliya were completed in 2020. Because the line is Israel's most congested, there are long-term plans to extend the four-track section from Hertzliya to Haifa in stages. One set of dual tracks will be used mostly by suburban trains and the other set by express trains traveling nonstop or making only one stop (in Hadera) between Tel Aviv and Haifa. The express tracks will be designed to accommodate train speeds of up to 250 km/h. Space will also be reserved within the boundaries of the plan to accommodate an additional suburban set of rails on the route. The overall cost of the project between Hertzliya and Hof HaCarmel is estimated at appx. NIS 16 billion (equivalent to US$4.7 billion in 2021 dollars).

==== Ayalon bottleneck ====
The section between Tel Aviv HaHagana and Tel Aviv Central currently consists of three tracks. Many rail lines in Israel use this section which is operating at full capacity. This severely restricts the ability of Israel Railways to expand service to different parts of the country and constitutes a critical bottleneck in the entire national rail network. Given that this section is located in a dense urban environment and with the railway being bound by the Ayalon River to the east and the southbound lanes of the Ayalon Highway in the west makes the addition of a fourth track an extremely complex engineering challenge.

External videos
- Netivei Yisrael video (YouTube) – Renderings of additional passenger station platforms to be constructed as part of the Ayalon four-tracking project.

After many years of deliberations on the matter, an NIS 5.5 billion (equivalent to appx. US$1.5 billion in 2018 dollars) project was approved in 2018 to add the fourth track to the Ayalon section by constructing an elevated platform over the channel of the Ayalon River to carry the new track. Since the platform will reduce the capacity of the channel to carry water, the project also includes large-scale drainage works to divert excess rainwater into specially-constructed reservoirs, including one on the grounds of Ariel Sharon Park, and a temporary reservoir on the grounds of the Mikveh Israel agricultural school southeast of Tel Aviv to be used until an underground pipeline can be constructed to divert the outlet of the Ayalon River from northern to southern Tel Aviv. The overall project also includes adding two additional tracks within a widened Highway 1 median extending from HaHagana to the Ganot/Shapirim interchanges (where the railway to Ben Gurion Airport branches out from the Tel Aviv–Lod railway).

Despite the urgency in adding the fourth track, due to additional necessary permits and approvals, the detailed design of the project, and extensive preparatory drainage works, construction is not expected to begin until the early-to-mid 2020s, with works expected to take place through at least 2028. The State Comptroller of Israel has harshly criticized the governmental planning authorities for the repeated delays associated with the construction of the fourth track, which is a critical missing element in Israel's public transportation infrastructure.

=== Other plans ===
As part of large-scale project to revive the long-defunct Eastern line, the railway section between Pardes Hanna and Kfar Sava began operating in 2026, although electrification works on this section are still ongoing. This revived railway may serve as a backup railroad to the coastal railway south of Remez junction, while at other times serve mainly freight trains with some limited passenger service.

== See also ==
- Israel Railways
- Jaffa–Jerusalem railway
