= DSB Class MF =

Danish-built diesel multiple unit trainset

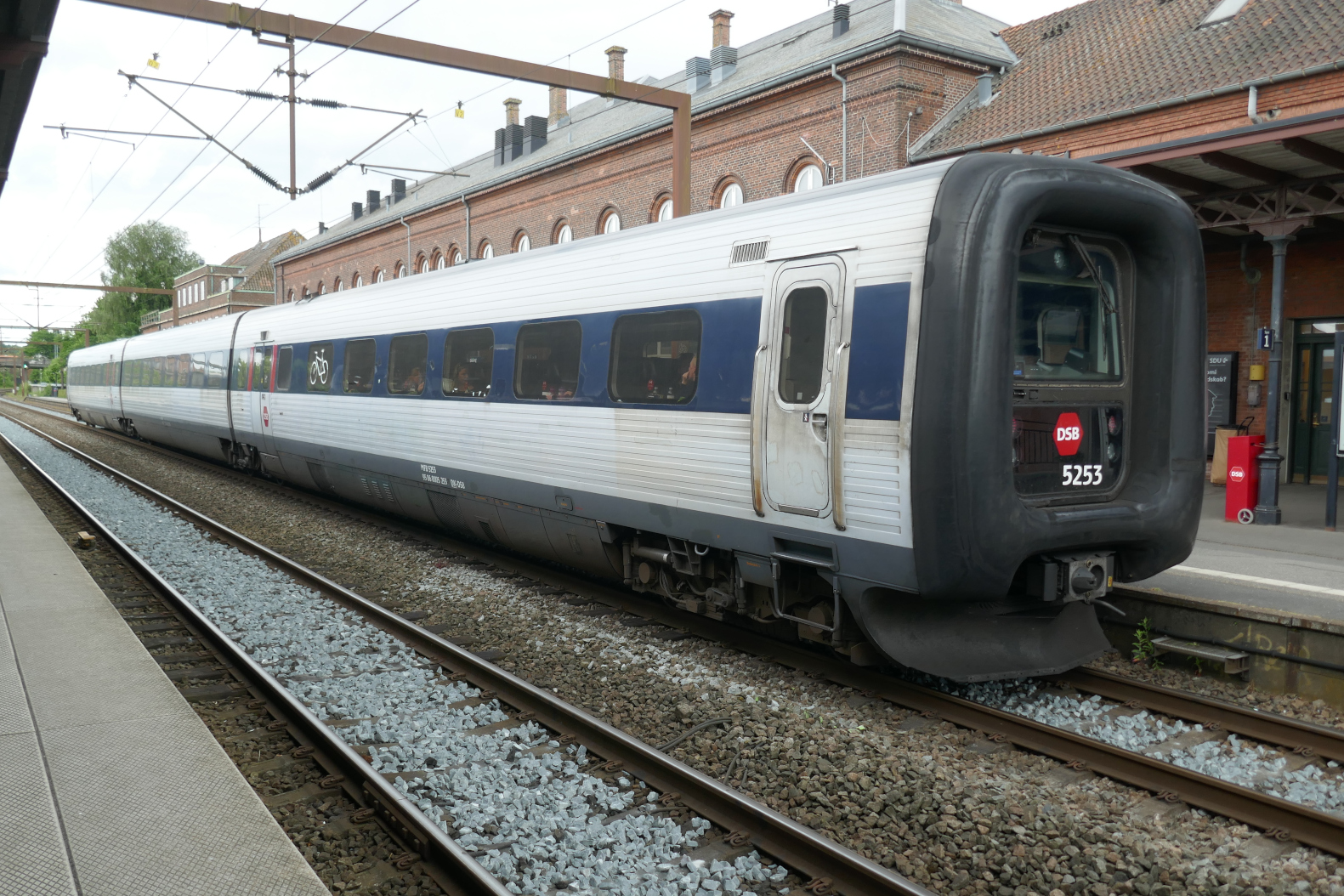
- DSB Class MF at Esbjerg June 2025
- In service: 13 January 1990–present
- Manufacturers: ABB Scandia, Bombardier, RAMTA
- Built at: Randers, Denmark; Dimona, Israel (final assembly of Israeli IC3 units)
- Family name: IC2^{da}, IC3^{da}, & IR4^{da}: Flexliner^{da}; Øresundståg: Contessa^{da}
- Replaced: Locomotive-hauled InterCity cars and Litra MA
- Constructed: 1986–2001
- Refurbished: Alstom, Banedanmark and DSB; Langå workshops (2017–)
- Number built: 202
- Formation: MFA-FF-MFB
- Operators: Current: DSB; Renfe; Transdev (Øresundståg); Krösatågen; Lokaltog; Former: Amtrak; Via Rail; DSB Småland; Israel Railways; SJ; Skånetrafiken; Blekingetrafiken; Hallandstrafiken; Kalmar länstrafik; Västra Götalandtrafiken; Östgötatrafiken; Deutsche Bahn; Stångådalsbanan; Tjustbanan

Specifications
- Car body construction: Aluminium
- Train length: 58.80 m (192 ft 11 in)
- Width: 3.10 m (10 ft 2 in)
- Height: 3.85 m (12 ft 8 in)
- Maximum speed: 180 km/h (112 mph)
- Weight: 97 t (95.5 long tons; 106.9 short tons)
- Prime movers: 1990: 4 x Deutz BF8L513CP V8; 2006: 4 x Deutz TCD 2015 V6
- Power output: 1990: 1,193 kW (1,600 hp); 2006: 1,342 kW (1,800 hp)
- Transmission: Mechanical, 1990: 4 x ZF Ecomat 5HP600 5-speed 2006: 4 x ZF AS-Rail 12-speed
- Acceleration: 1.0 m/s^{2}
- Braking systems: Pneumatic brake Electromagnetic track brake
- Safety systems: ATC, ERTMS/ETCS, PZB, ZUB 123
- Multiple working: IR4
- Track gauge: 1,435 mm (4 ft 8 1/2 in); 1,668 mm (5 ft 5 21/32 in), Renfe

The DSB Class MF is a Danish-built medium/long distance diesel multiple-unit train. The sets were built by ABB Scandia (later purchased by Adtranz, which itself was subsequently acquired by Bombardier Transportation) in Randers. This train model has been operating in Denmark and Sweden since 1990 and was previously operated in Israel from 1992–2024. The name IC3 indicates simply that it is a three-carriage InterCity trainset.

A total of 153 trainsets were built in 1989–98 by ABB Scandia in Randers, of which 96 trainsets were for DSB. Other sets were exported to Sweden, Israel, Spain, the United States, and Canada. At DSB, up to five train sets can be connected for a total length of 292.5 m (960 ft) and a total of 720 seats.

An electrically powered four-carriage version, the IR4, was introduced between 1995 and 1998.

== General overview ==
Two IC3 trains coupled together, the front door swung aside. Notice the large pins (retracted) which are responsible for keeping the door shut when the cab is used

Rubber diaphragms sealing the trains together

The IC3 is a wide articulated train made of light alloy with Jacobs bogies shared between three carriages. There are two 298 kW (400 hp) engines at each end of the front and rear carriages, giving a total of 1,192 kW (1,598 bhp). The centre car is unpowered.

The efficient mechanical transmissions with multiple gear ratios and high power for the 97 t (95 long tons; 107 short tons) tare weight give the IC3 good acceleration capabilities. The short distances between stations on inter-city routes in Denmark make acceleration more important than high top speed, and so the IC3 units are geared for a top service speed of only 180 km/h (112 mph).

The front- and cab-design is the most significant feature of the IC3 (and its cousins). When viewed from the outside, the viewer will notice the large rubber diaphragm surrounding a flat cab. The cab is a separate section of the train, but the table with the controls is mounted on a large door, to which the seat is also mounted. When two or more trainsets are coupled together in a single train, the entire front door folds away to give a wide passage, and the rubber diaphragms at the ends form a flush aerodynamic seal. The IC3 can also couple and run in tandem with the electrical version, the IR4. Up to five trainsets can be coupled together. The IC3 can also be coupled mechanically with its Flexliner little sister, IC2', but not the cousin ET-FT-ET.

DSB runs 96 IC3 sets and 44 IR4 sets.

Some IC3s run in Sweden, mainly Kalmar-Linköping. They are designated Y2. Before 2007, they also ran Malmö-Karlskrona (designated Y2K; adapted to run in Denmark as well), but that railway has been electrified, and after that 13 sets were sold to Denmark and Israel, and one was scrapped because of a truck collision causing the death of a train driver. Six sets still run in Sweden.

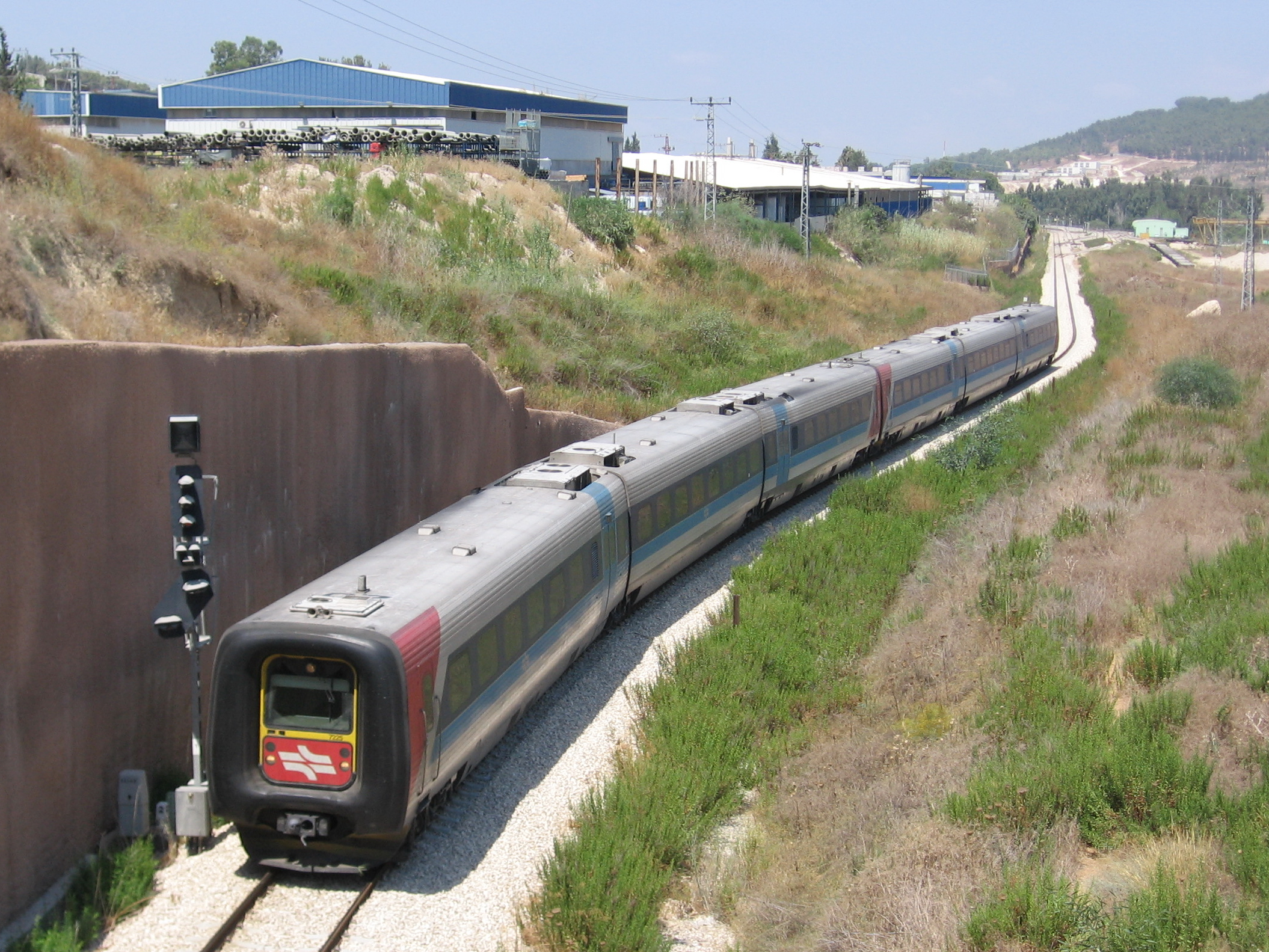
Israel Railways IC3 on the now-retired old line to Jerusalem, 2006

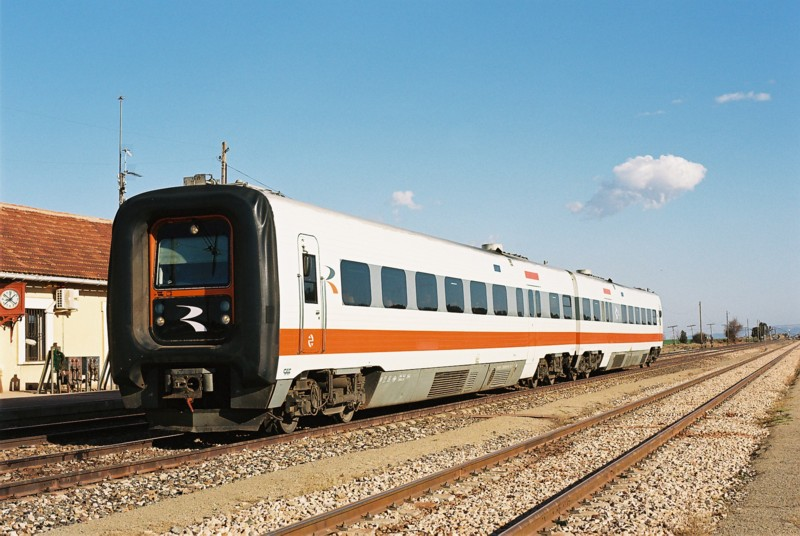
Renfe Class Spanish litra 594 at Puerto-Escandon, April 2005

Another large operator of the IC3 trains is Israel Railways, who operate about 50 IC3 sets. Some of those sets were assembled in Israel from Danish-imported complete knock-down (CKD) kits by RAMTA, a division of Israel Aerospace Industries, in Dimona, and some are modified IC3 trainsets which were originally delivered to Sweden. Israel Railways has started to slowly retire their sets since 2021.

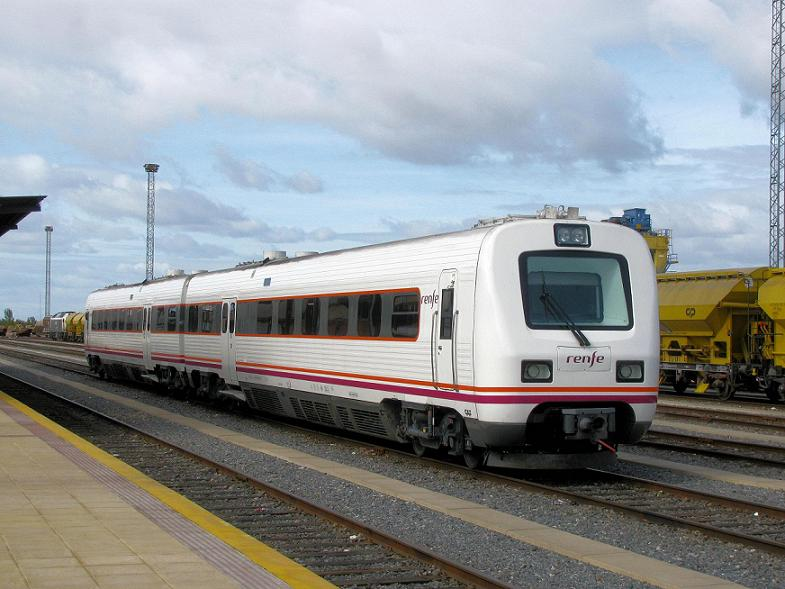
Renfe Class 594, TRD refurbished IC3

Similarly, in Spain, the national rail operator Renfe operates some IC3 derivatives classified as RENFE Class 594 on the Valladolid - Zamora - Puebla de Sanabria, Coruña - Ferrol, Coruña - Lugo - Monforte de Lemos and Madrid - Soria routes since 1997 as a medium-range regional service (Media Distancia). The Class 594 trains were built by CAF under a technology license agreement from ABB Scandia. Some Class 594 units were refurbished in the 2010s and, as a consequence, have had their rubber diaphragms removed in favour of conventional cab ends.

In 1997, an Israel Railways IC3 was tested in North America under the name ‘Flexliner’. Amtrak used it on the Hiawatha, St Louis and Kansas City Mules, San Diegan, and between Eugene and Portland, Oregon; Via Rail Canada tested it for services on the Windsor–Quebec corridor.

The total number of ABB Scandia/Adtranz-built IC3 and IC3-based trainsets is 202.

=== Internet ===
These trains were equipped with wireless internet through a WiFi connection. This service is available for InterCity and InterCityLyn trains between Copenhagen and Århus. This is available free of charge for visiting DSB and TDC network websites and for two minutes for other websites. DSB's costs for internet use are 29 DKK for 5 hours of internet within a 24-hour period.

== History ==
Development of the IC3 started in 1984, production started in 1986, and they entered service in 1991. However, its roots can be traced back further. In 1972, DSB celebrated its 125th anniversary, and at the same time made some large changes. First of all, two years later, in 1974, a completely new timetable system, the K74, was introduced. Secondly, the concept of lyntog was removed as the foundation of the long-distance traffic, and instead a new InterCity concept took over that role. After a few years, a new concept emerged, the so-called APO-lyntog, which were workgroups tasked with specific areas. There were groups for electrical locomotives, diesel-powered locomotives, and others, including the "long distance train" APO group.

The long-distance train - APO was originally tasked with finding a suitable train for long-distance traffic. However, it was later rumoured that the lyntog-concept might be re-introduced within a few years, and so it was decided to find a suitable design for that concept. Several requirements were made: primarily to use air-conditioning for cooling and heating of passenger areas, and be able to use either electric or diesel propulsion. The second requirement were due to the fact, that the Danish politicians had yet to decide whether or not to fund a proposed electrification of the mainlines of the Danish railways. At the time no such train were available, so the group designed one themselves. In order to avoid propulsion units in the train (and thus reducing variants and development costs), it was designed to use a locomotive to haul it, and equip the end wagons with driver cabins. The train was designed as a set of 5 carriages, with a service car in the middle (containing a small kiosk, and other facilities) and 4 passenger coaches.

In 1983, the group responsible for the timetables had made a set of requirements for the ideal future train for the InterCity traffic. The requirements were based on experience with the prototype (which had now become known as IC5; not to be confused with the new electric Alstom Coradia Stream trains ordered by DSB in 2021): it should be light-weight (preferably built of aluminium), its passenger compartments should have fixed windows and air conditioning, it should be self-propelled, it should use standard engine and transmission components from the bus and truck industry, and it should be fast and easy to add carriages (by coupling with another trainset); along with a number of technical requirements. The new project became designated IC3.

After the IC3 project had been proposed, it was relatively quickly decided to cancel development of the IC5-prototype, as it suffered from several problems. The main problem was the weight of the train. Originally it had been estimated to weigh around 200 to 210 tonnes (197 to 207 long tons; 220 to 231 short tons), but ended up weighing 270 tonnes (266 long tons; 298 short tons). A train of similar size and capacity, consisting of conventional wagons, would weigh approximately the same as originally estimated. When it was first proposed to cancel the IC5 project, the train's designers tried to save it by proposing several solutions to the train's problems, but to no use: DSB's management had decided that the IC3 was the proper train for the future.

The task of developing the IC3 was assigned to a joint-group of designers and technical engineers from DSB itself and the factory Scandia (now a part of the Bombardier corporation). As a side note, it should be mentioned that neither DSB or Scandia themselves, wished that they (Scandia) got the task, as they had pretty much no experience in this kind of trains.

The first IC3 set was delivered in 1988, but suffered from a number of teething problems primarily due to its (at the time very advanced) computer systems. One example was that it would lock the toilet door with no apparent reason (it was programmed to lock the door either when in use and requested so via a button, or when the toilet-system suffered a problem). Another issue was that snow would build up around the diaphragms and block the driver's view. By late 1990, the majority of these problems had been solved, and so the train entered service in 1991.

In 2017, DSB announced the IC3 stock would receive a 10-year life extension, allowing them to replace IC4 trains.

In 2018, the first six ERTMS-retrofitted IC3 trains left the workshop at Langå, with the conversions performed by Alstom with technical assistance from Banedanmark and DSB. All IC3's are to be converted to ERTMS from the proprietary ZUB 123 ATC system, which is to be done around the fall of 2019 and into 2020.

In 2021, DSB bought two sets from Israel Railways for spare parts. In 2021, Israel Railways announced its intention to retire its IC3 fleet, in light of the introduction of Siemens Desiro HC electric multiple units and newer fifth-generation Bombardier Double-deck Coaches. The trains were withdrawn from timetabled services in November 2023 but retained as backup, and completely retired on 28 January 2024. This entailed the permanent termination of services on the Jaffa-Jerusalem railway between Beit Shemesh and Jerusalem–Malha (which have already been suspended indefinitely due to the COVID-19 pandemic), as the journey cannot be travelled by Israel Railway's newer rolling stock due to said railway line's restrictive loading gauge.

In 2021, the Maritime and Commercial Court ruled that Deutz AG had misused a dominant market position in 2010 regarding replacement motor parts.

The remaining Swedish Y2 fleet is due to be replaced by new CAF Civity Nordic electric and bi-modal trains, expected 2024–2027.

== Technical overview ==
An IC3 set consists of (as the name implies) three carriages. These are the MFA (passenger and motor carriage), the FF (passenger center carriage) and the MFB (passenger and motor carriage). The MFA and MFB are, from a technical point of view, identical and only differ slightly in the interior design.

The train is powered by four diesel engines, each delivering 298 kW (400 bhp; 405 PS), giving the train a total 1,193 kW (1,600 bhp; 1,622 PS) to propel it. The engines are mounted in the MFA and MFB carriages, with two engines in each carriage. Each engine drives the axles on the bogies via an electronically controlled automatic gearbox. The engines are mounted so that the end which would normally point forwards in a rear-wheel-drive car, instead faces the center of the MFA and MFB carriages. Due to this mounting design and nature of combustion engines and to the fact that the train runs forward in both directions, a so-called "reverse gear" had to be attached to automatic gearboxes. They are responsible for making the axles turn the right way. These gears are normally not controlled directly by the train's driver; instead, the train's on-board computers check which of the two cabs is active to determine the train's primary driving direction, setting the reverse gears accordingly.

== Fleet details ==
=== Class MF (IC3) ===
- Operator: DSB
- Number built: 92
- Year built: 1986–1992
- Cars per set: 3
- Unit nos.: 5001-5092
- Notes: 5076-5092 fitted with PZB to go to Germany, (IC3 DSB-DB REGIO) and DSB IC3.
- Models:
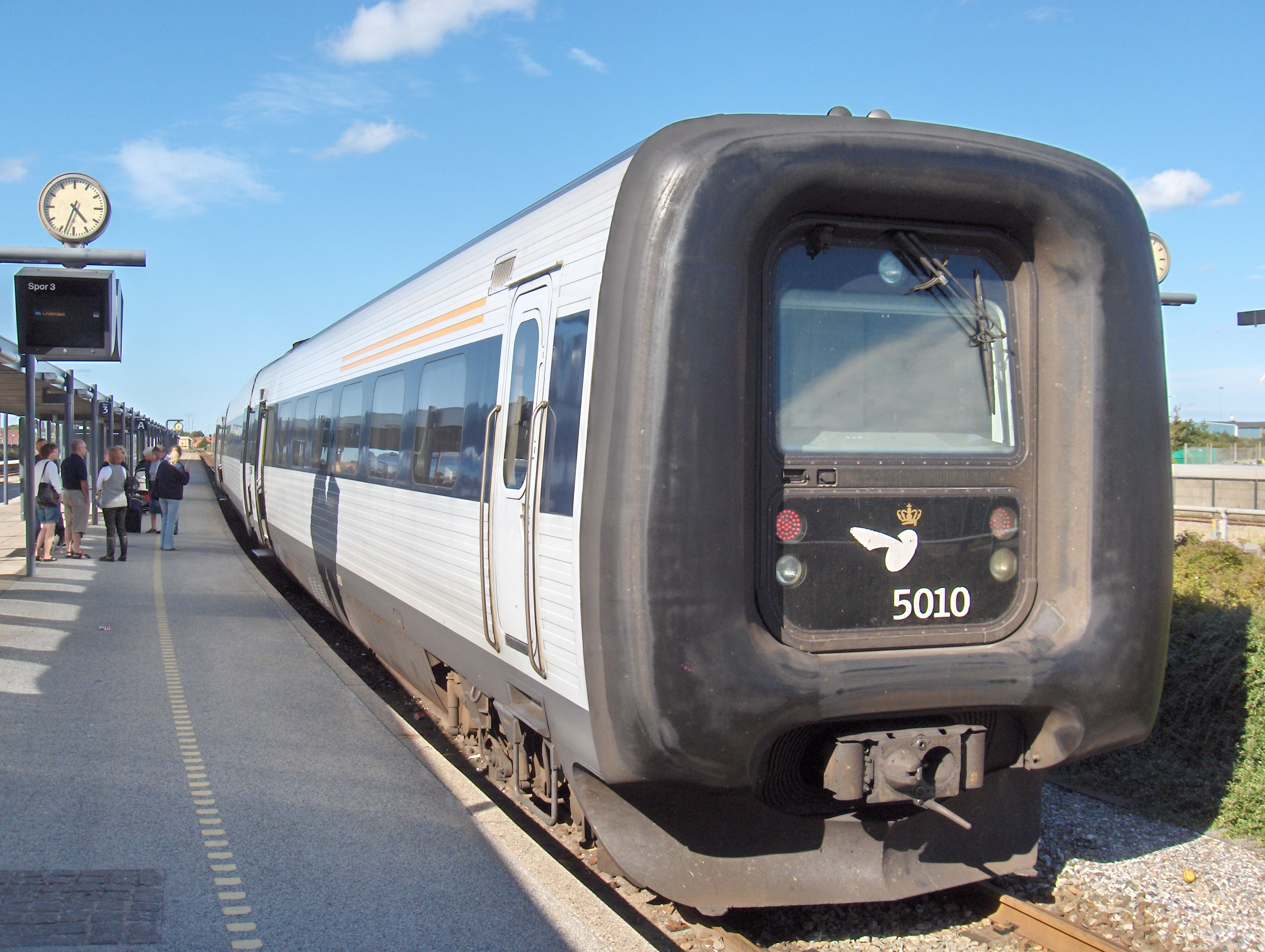
DSB Class MF (DSB IC3) at Frederikshavn station August 2007

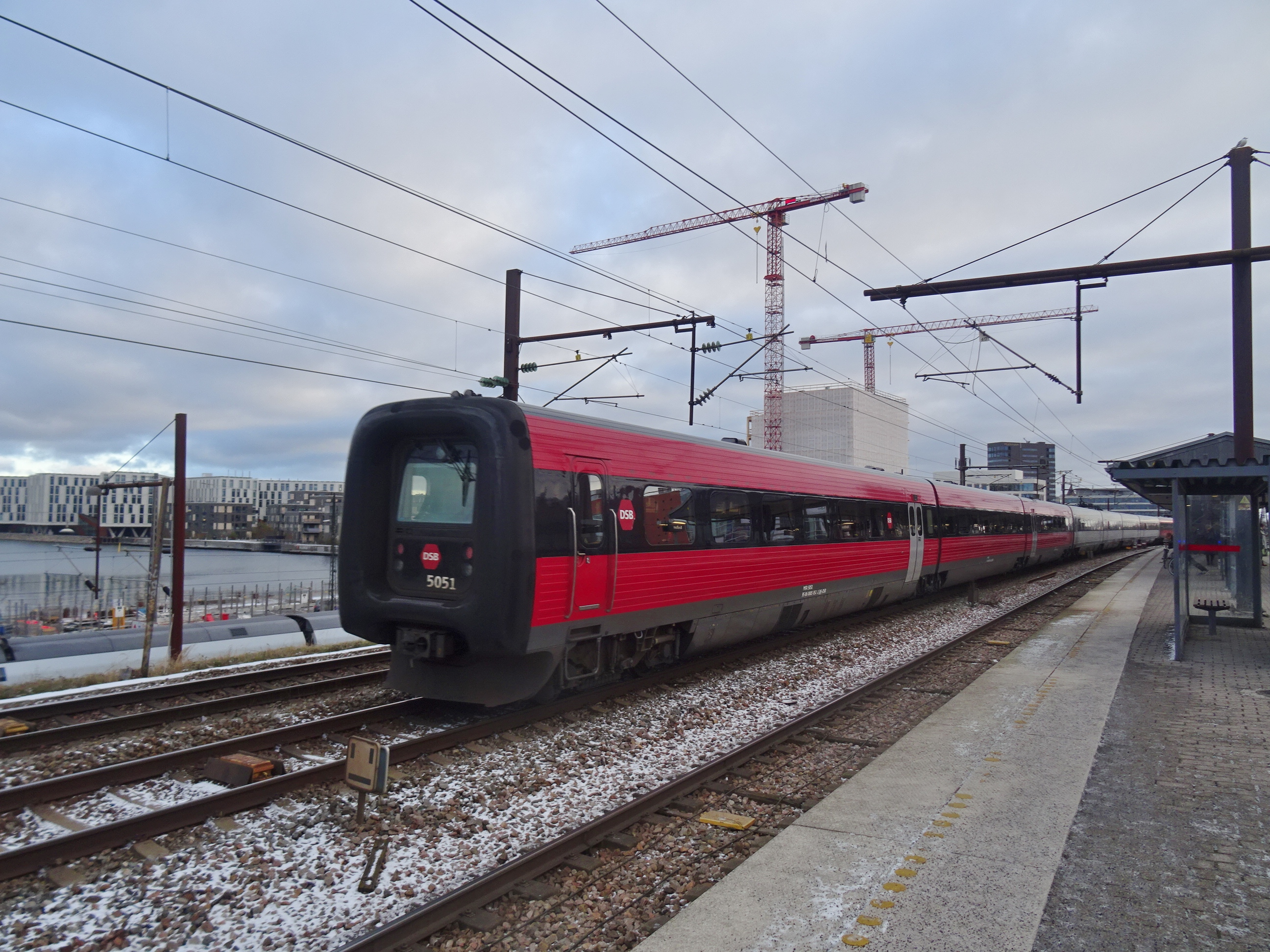
DSB IC3 51 at Nordhavn Station

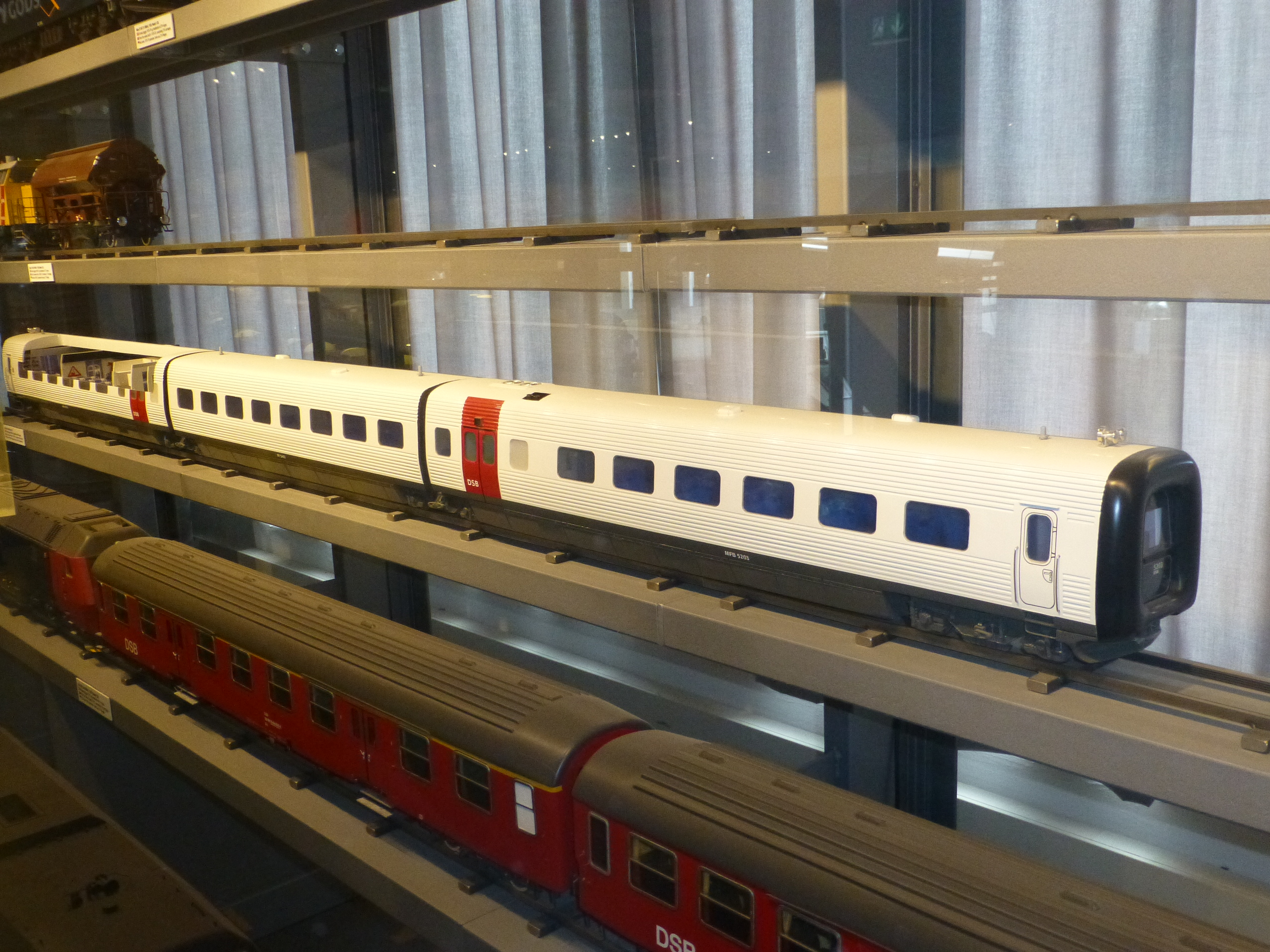
Model of DSB IC3

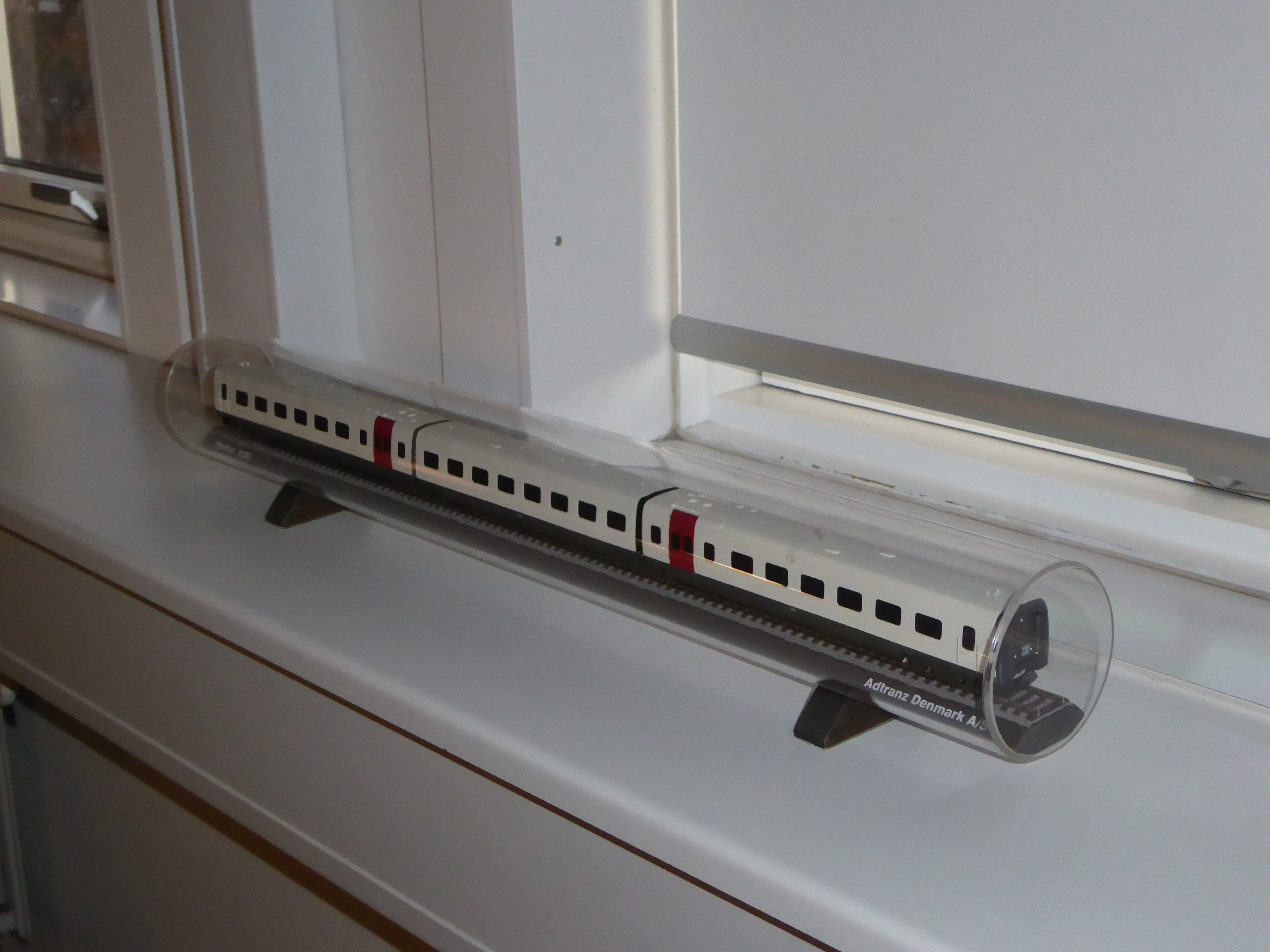
Models of trains from Bombardier - DSB IC3

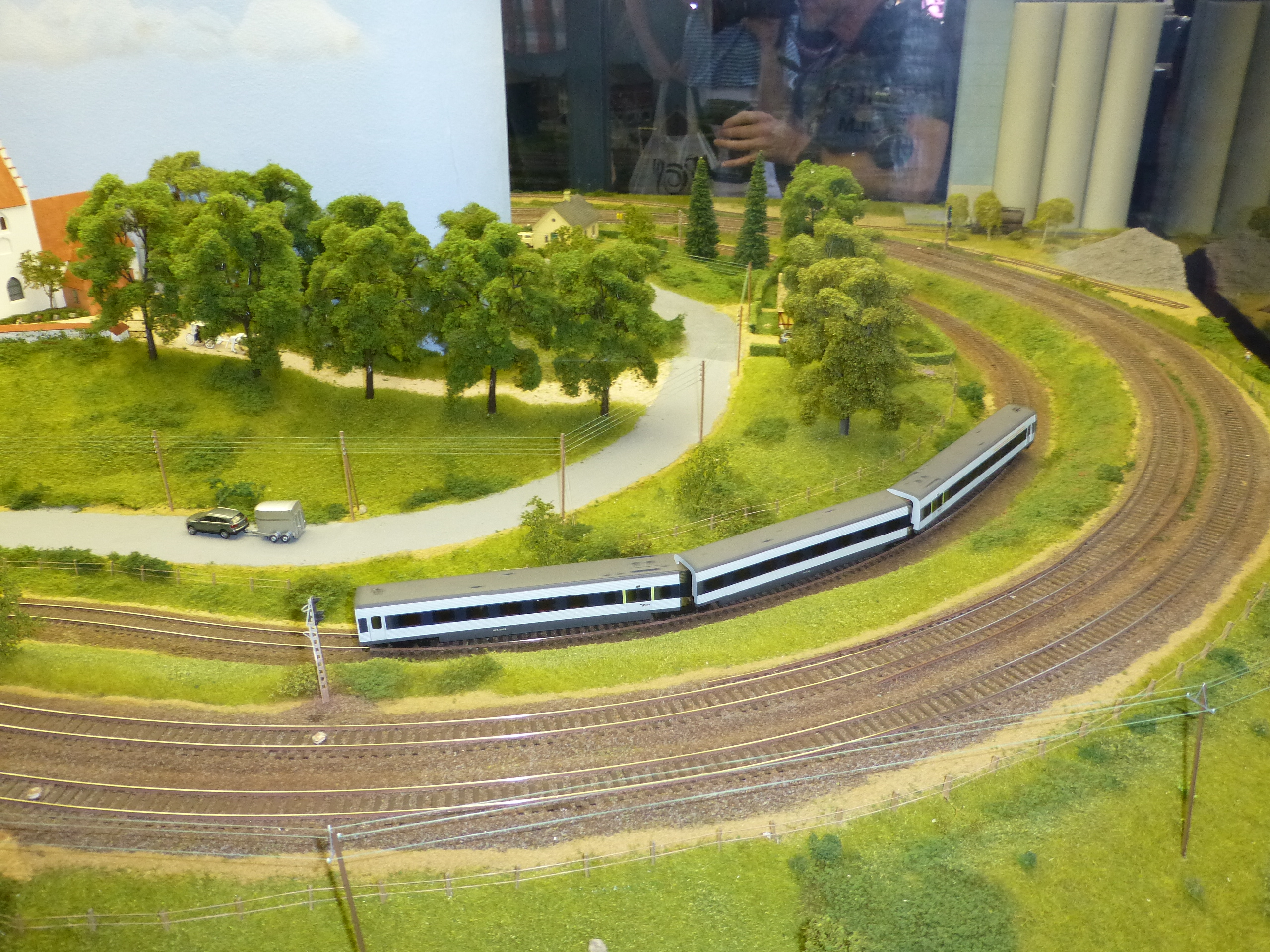
The third model of IC3’s trains

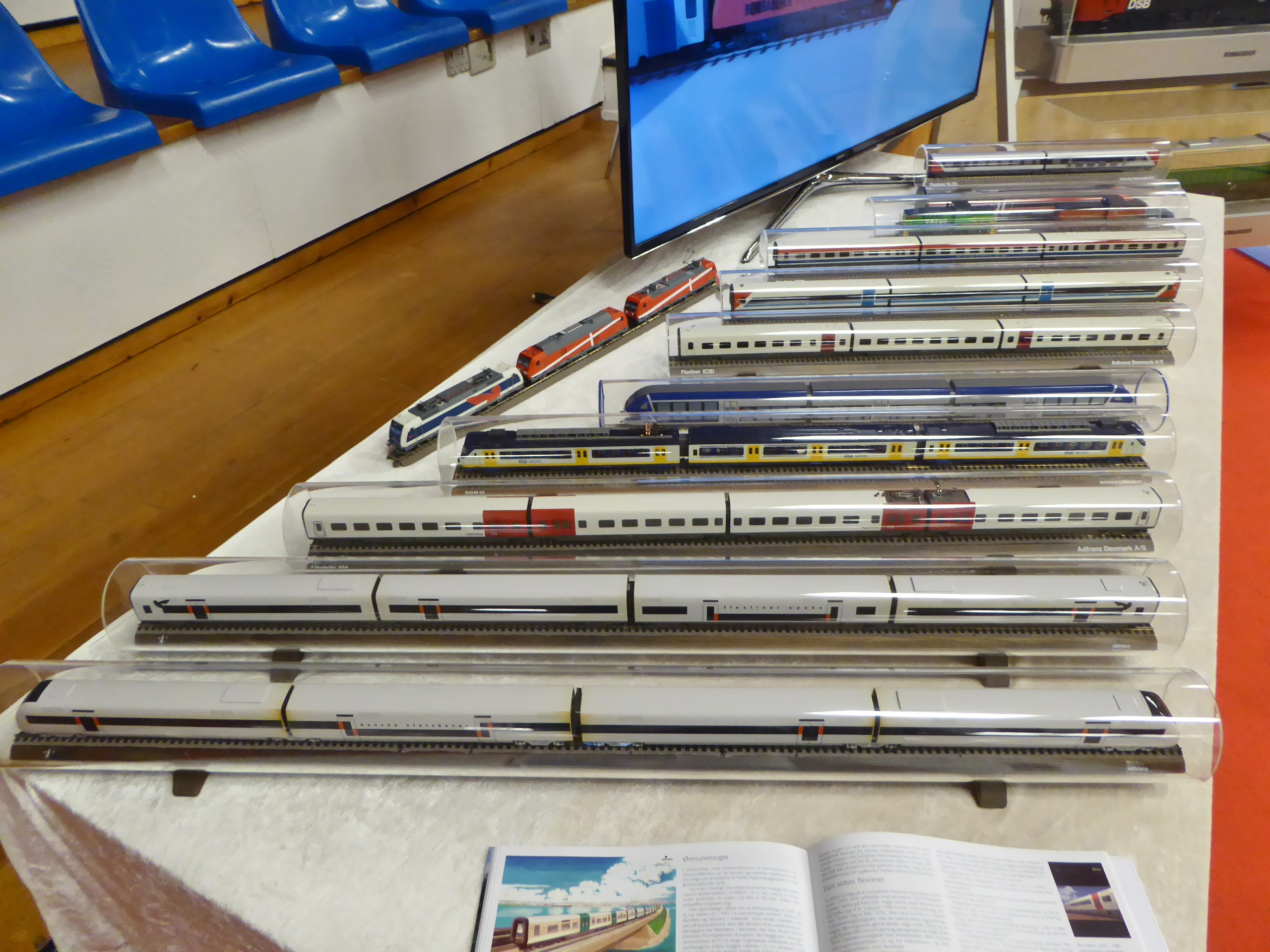
All of the models of Bombardier Transportation IC3’s trains
- Number built: 4
- Unit nos.: 5093-5096
- Notes: Purchased from SJ and sold to The Israel Railways and then returned to Randers, Denmark.
- Models:
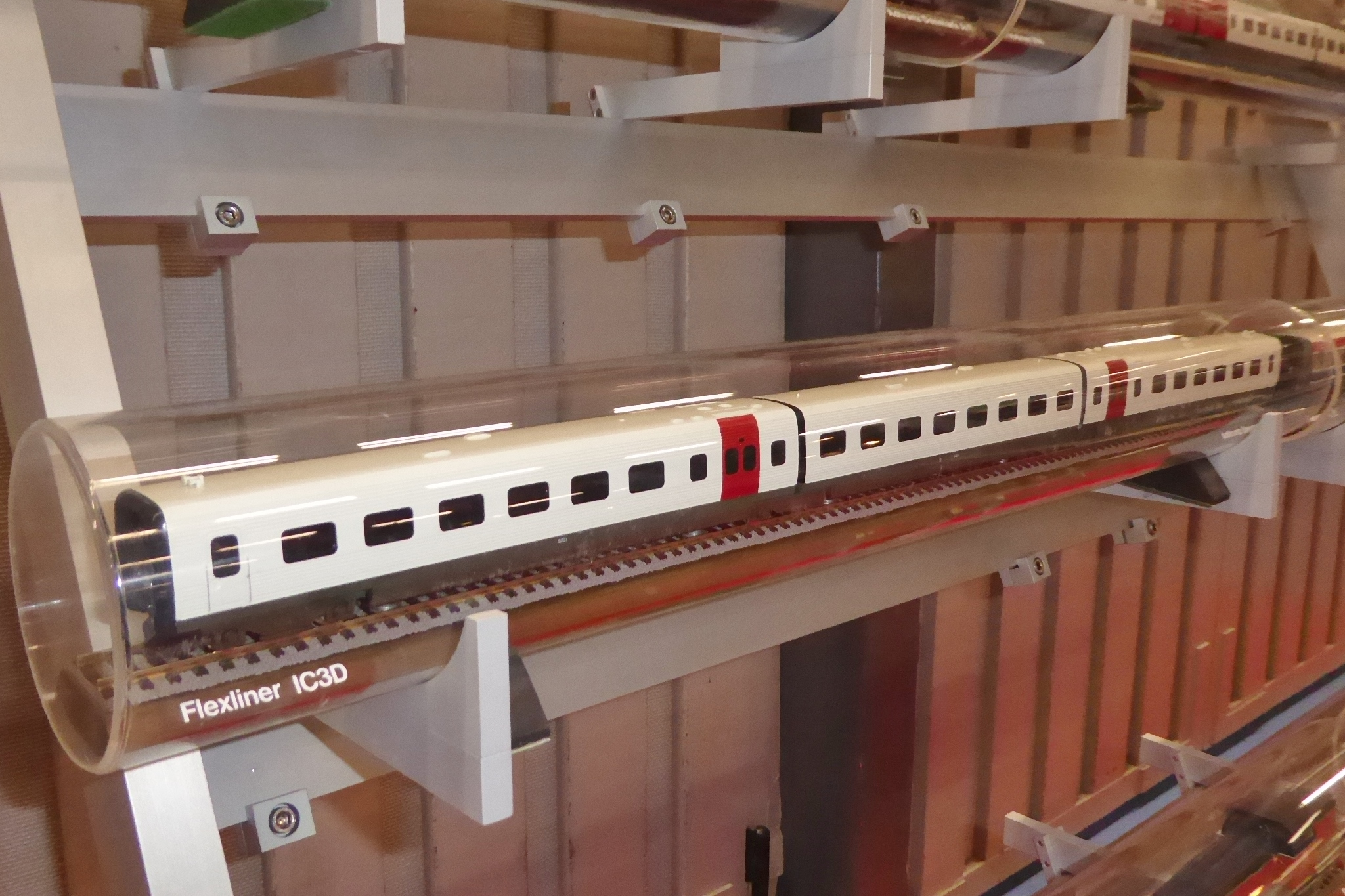
Model of DSB IC3 Bombardier Transportation

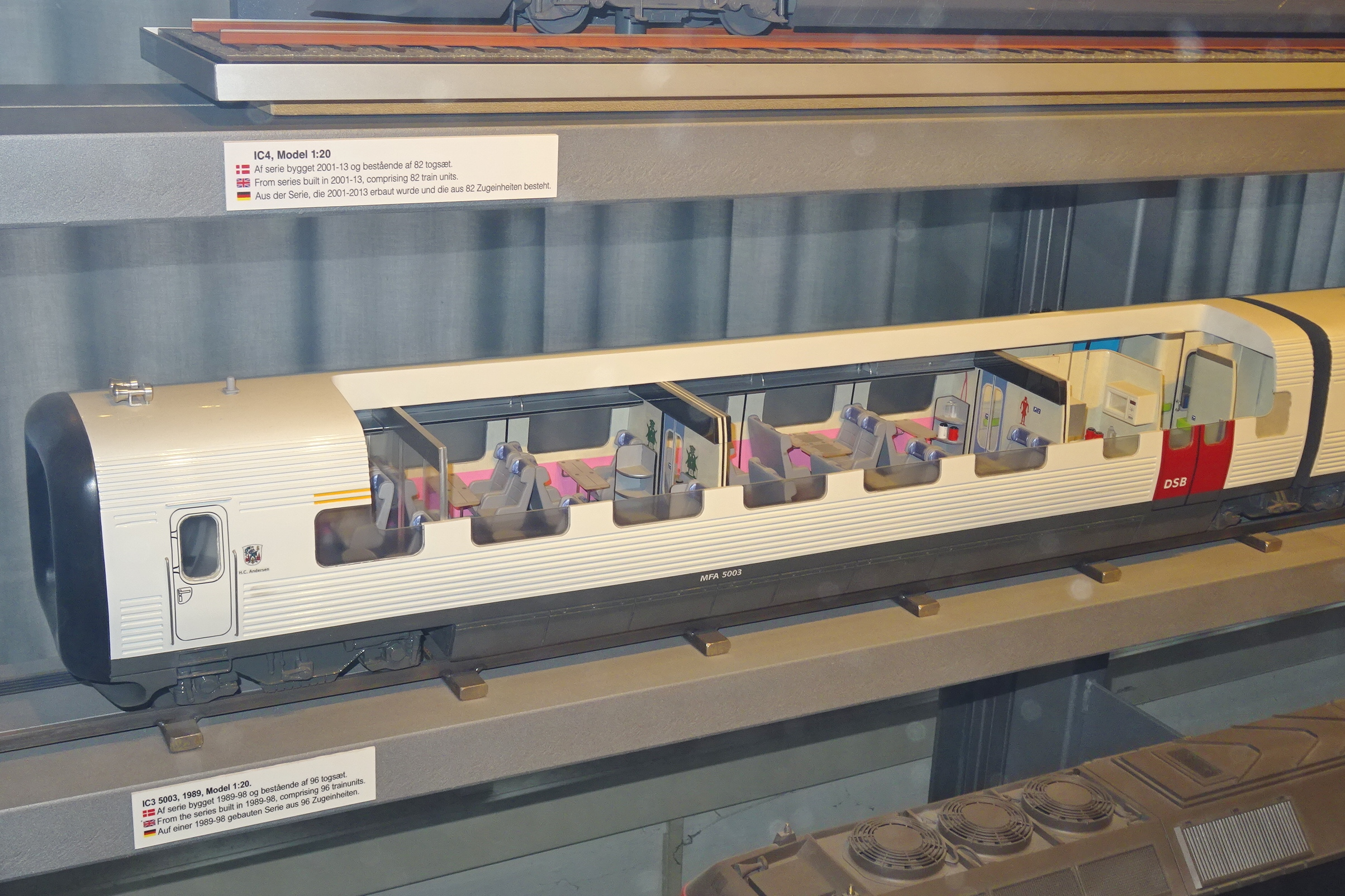
Model of DSB MFA 5003 and 5093-5096

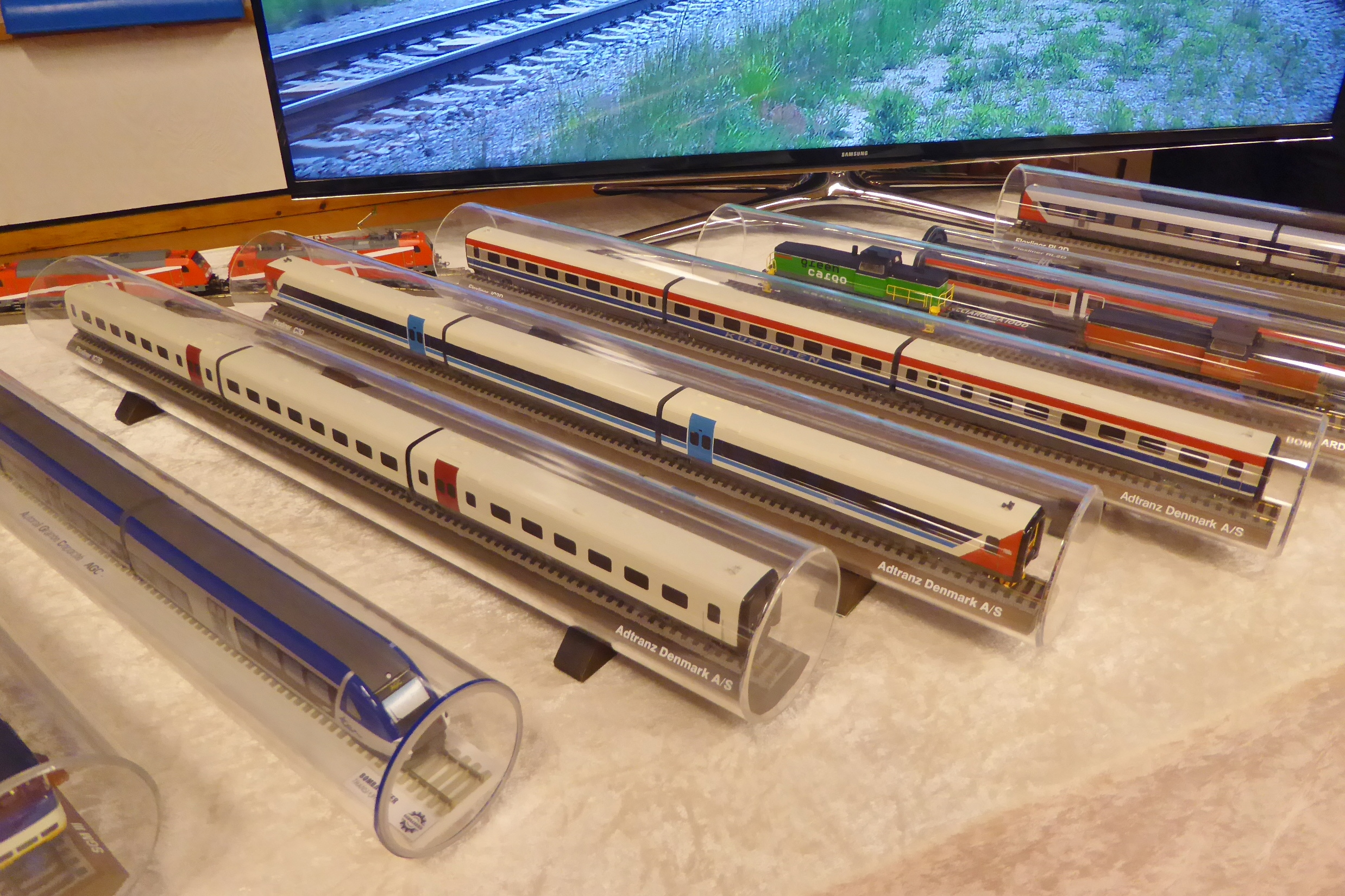
All the models of Bombardier Transportation IC3’s trains

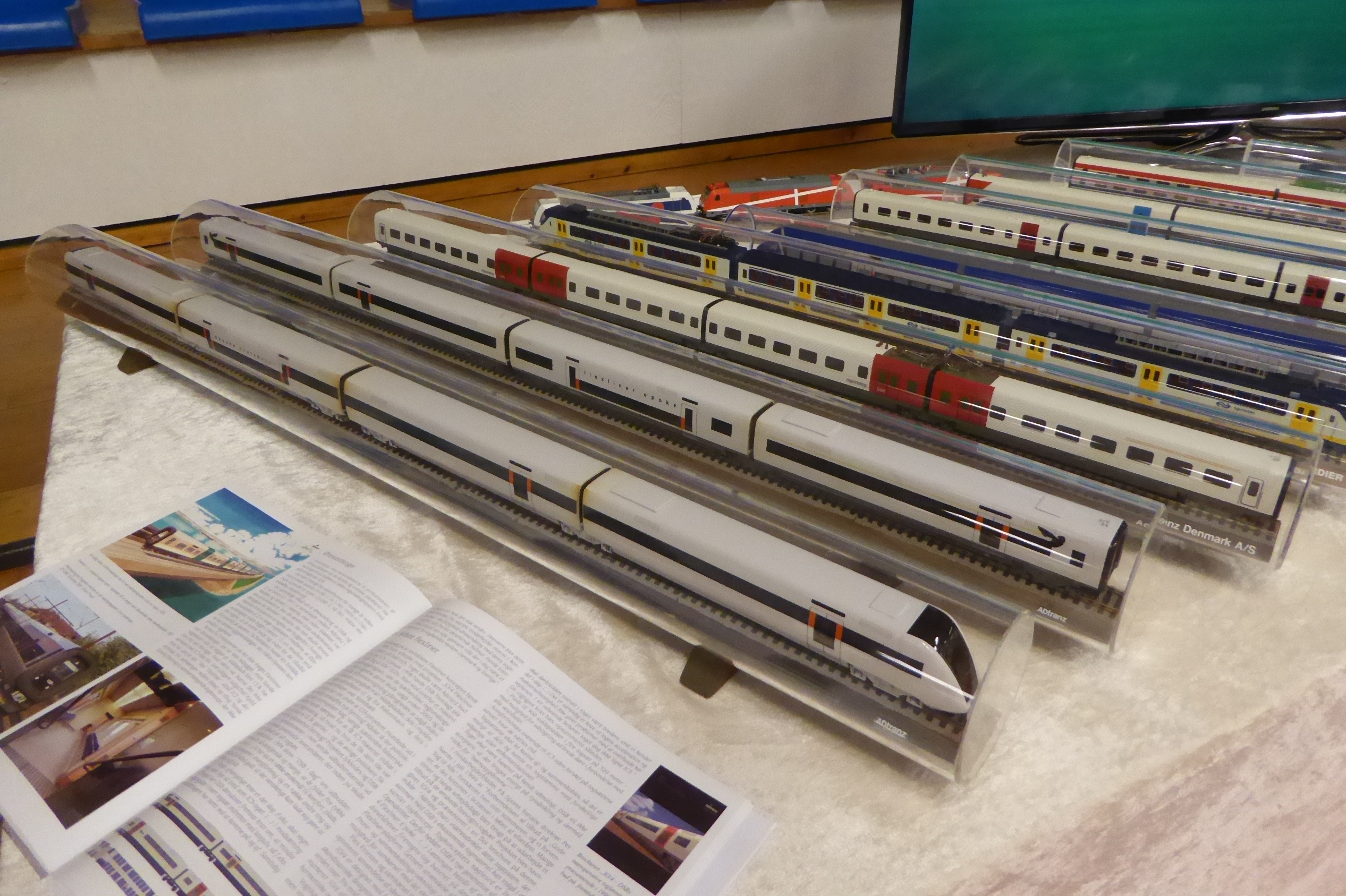
Some models of the IC3’s trains

=== Class 594.0 ===
- Operator: Renfe
- Number built: 16
- Year built: 1997–2001
- Cars per set: 2-3
- Unit nos.: 594.001-594.002, 594.004-594.008, 594.010-594.015
- Models:
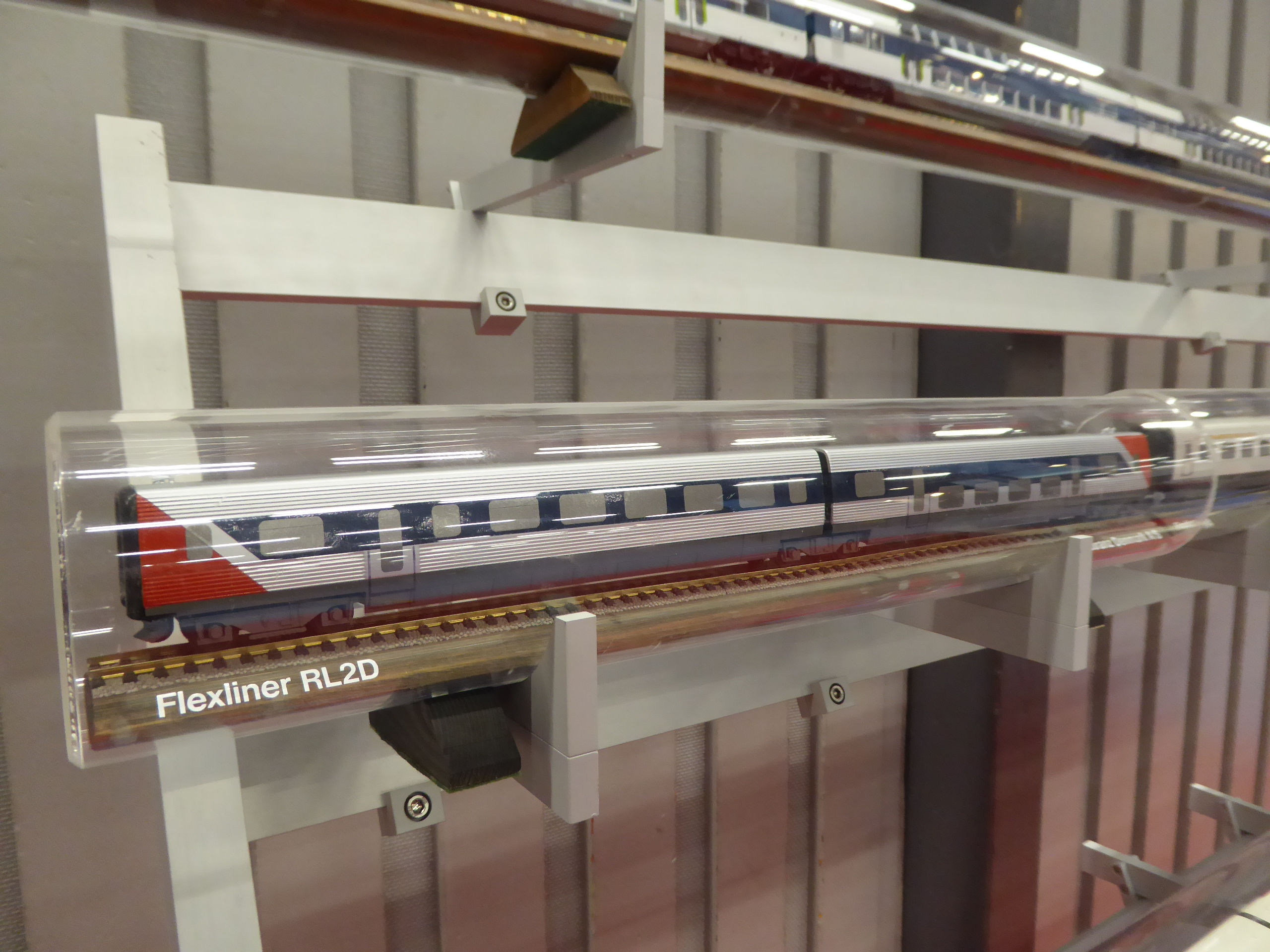
Model of Bombardier Transportation’s Renfe TRD Class 594, Spanish litra 594 trains

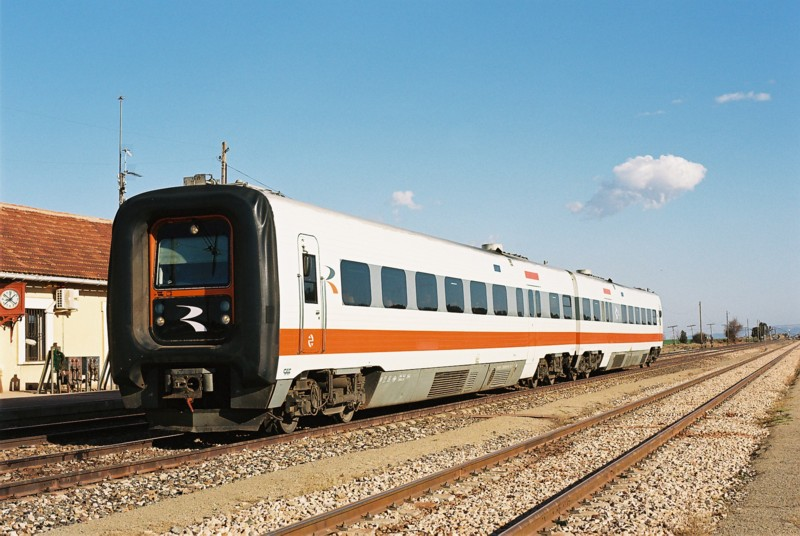
RENFE Class Spanish litra 594 at Puerto-Escandon, April 2005

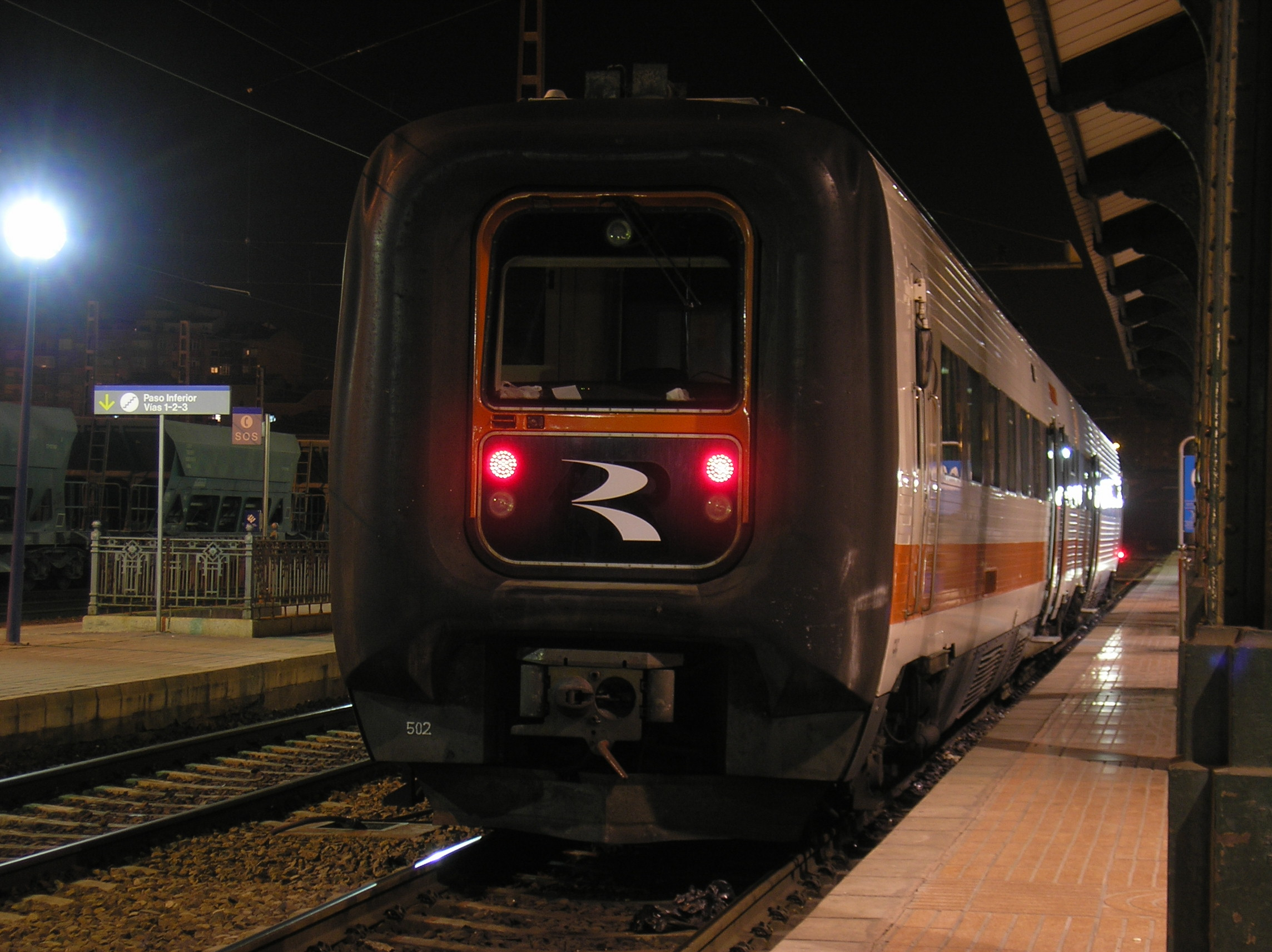
Renfe TRD

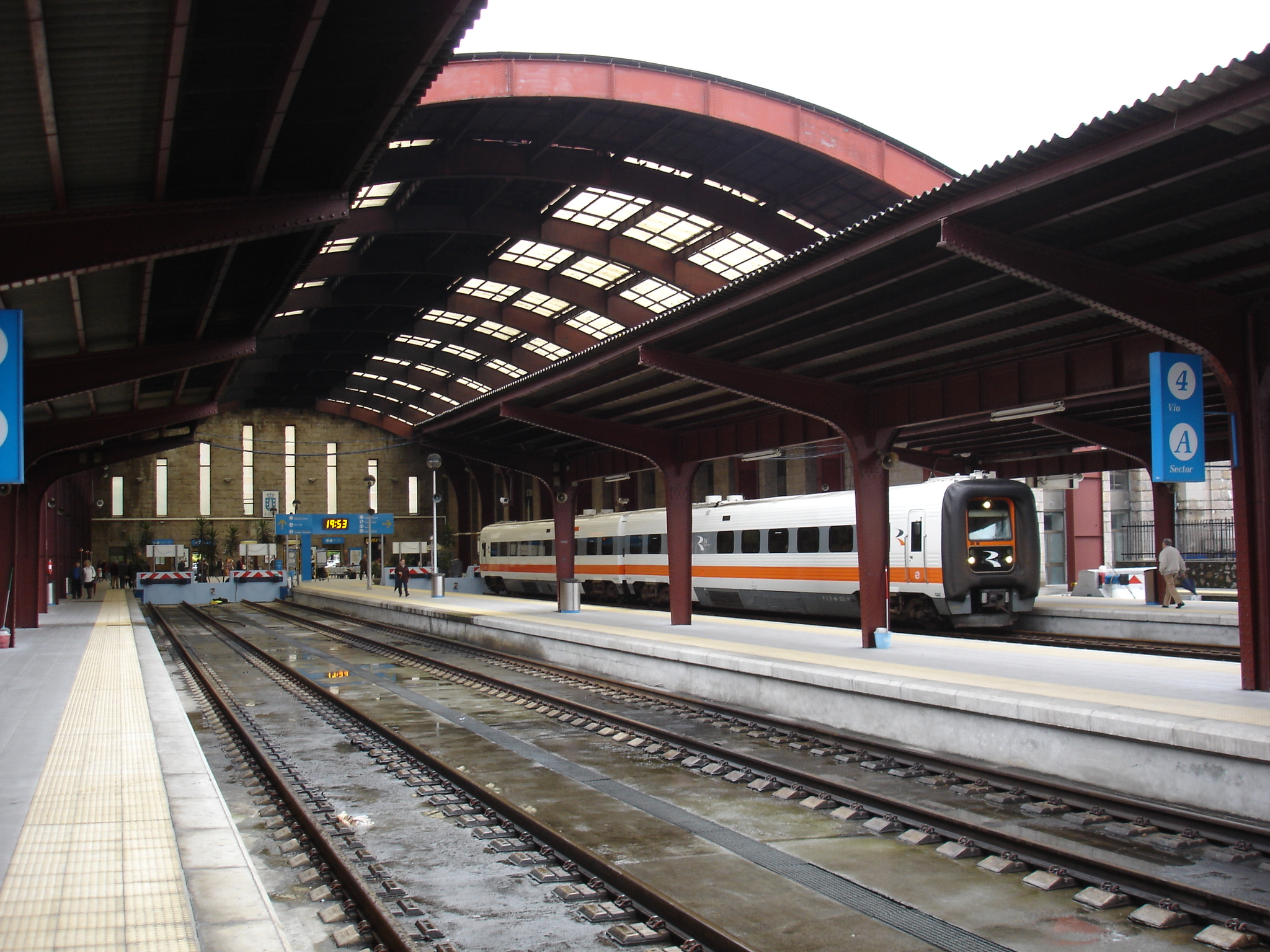
Interior Estación San Cristovo

=== Class 594.1 ===
- Operator: Renfe
- Number built: 8
- Unit nos.: 594.101-594.108
- Notes: Built with tilting capability
- Models:
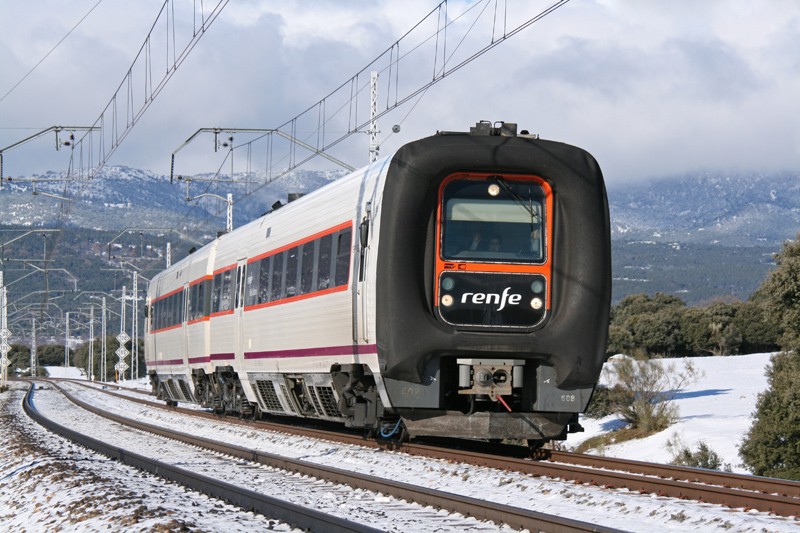
Renfe 594-108 TRD

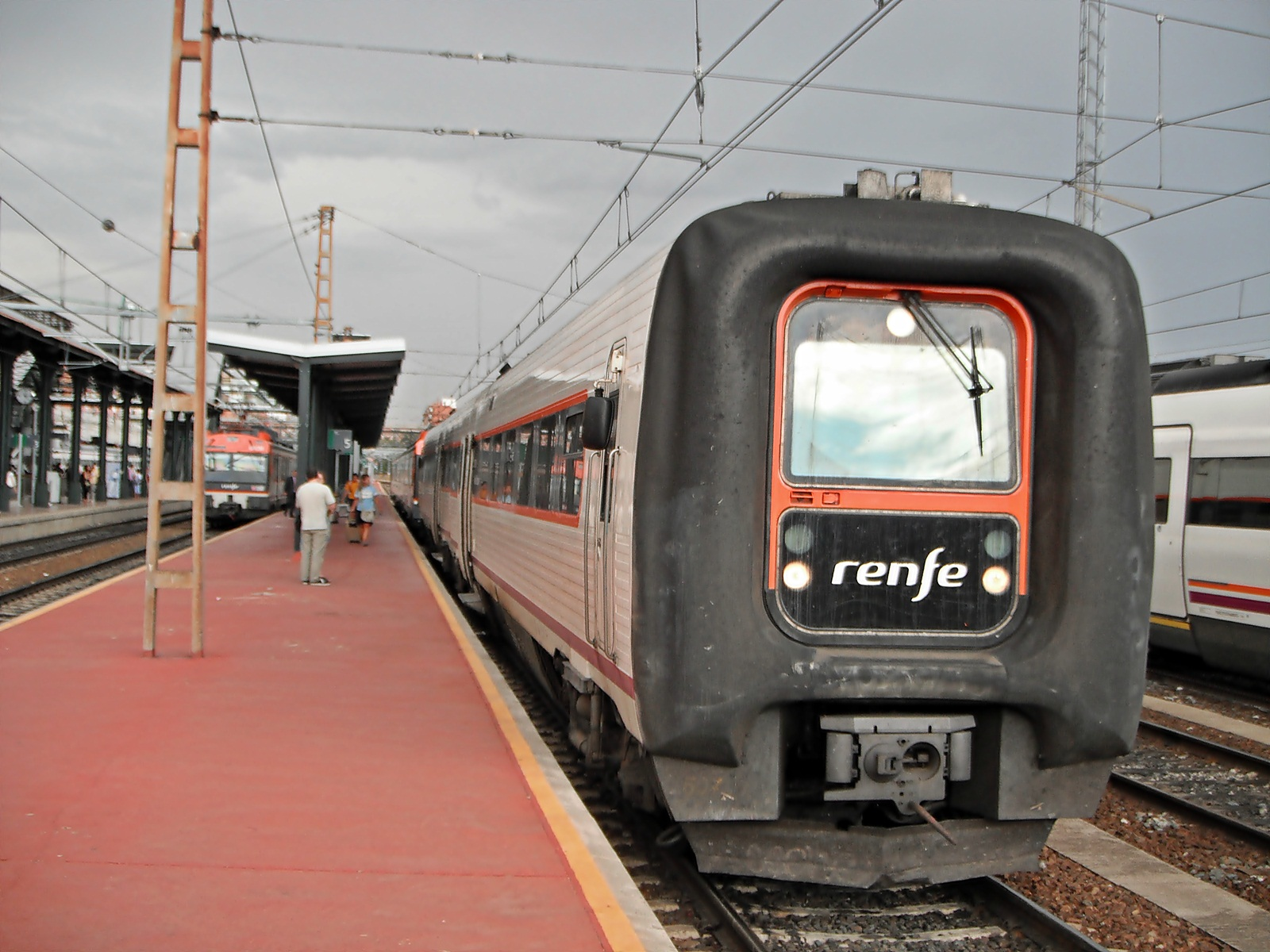
594-507 Valladolid-Puebla de Sanabria

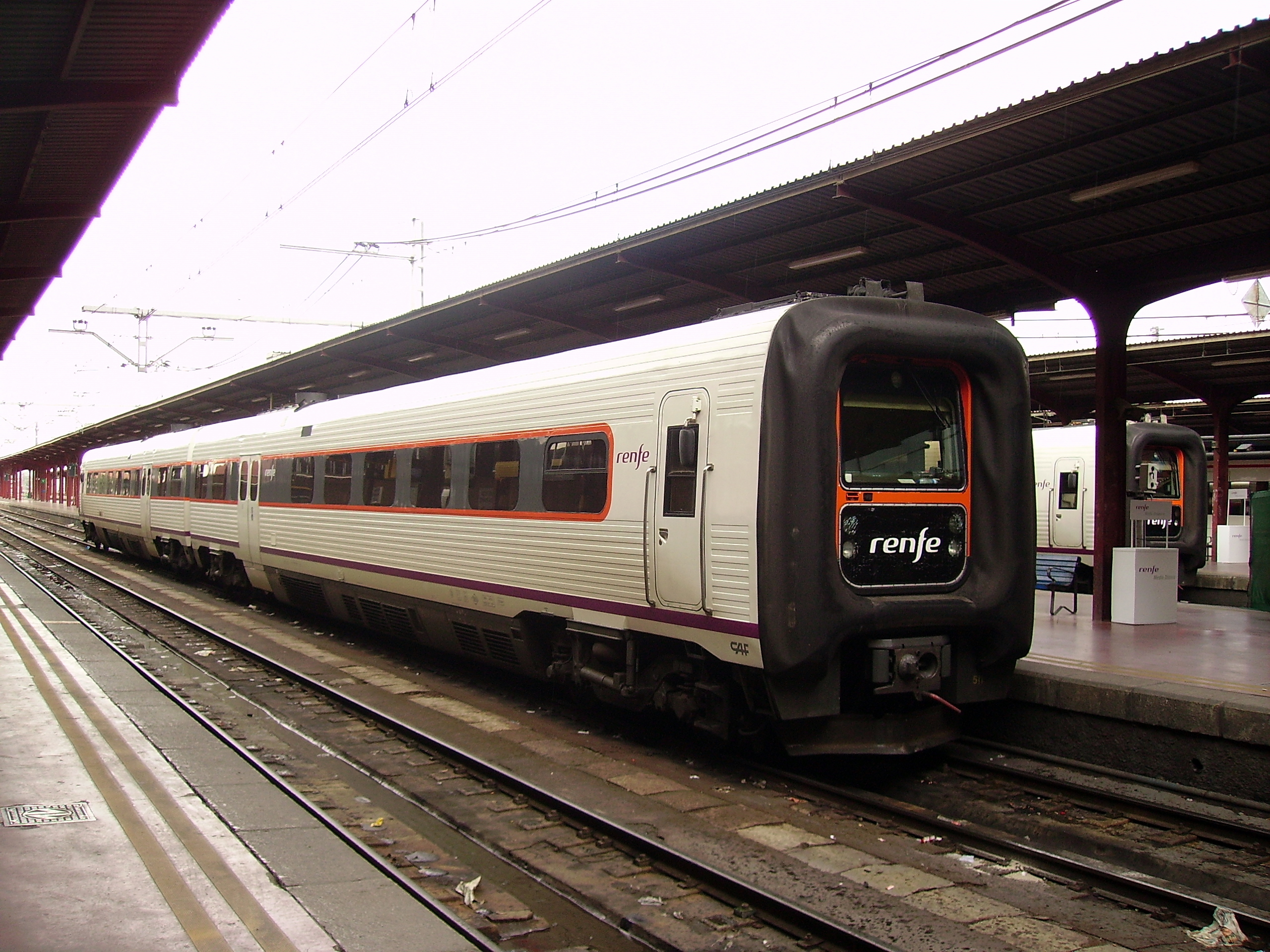
Tren Renfe TRD Madrid - Salamanca

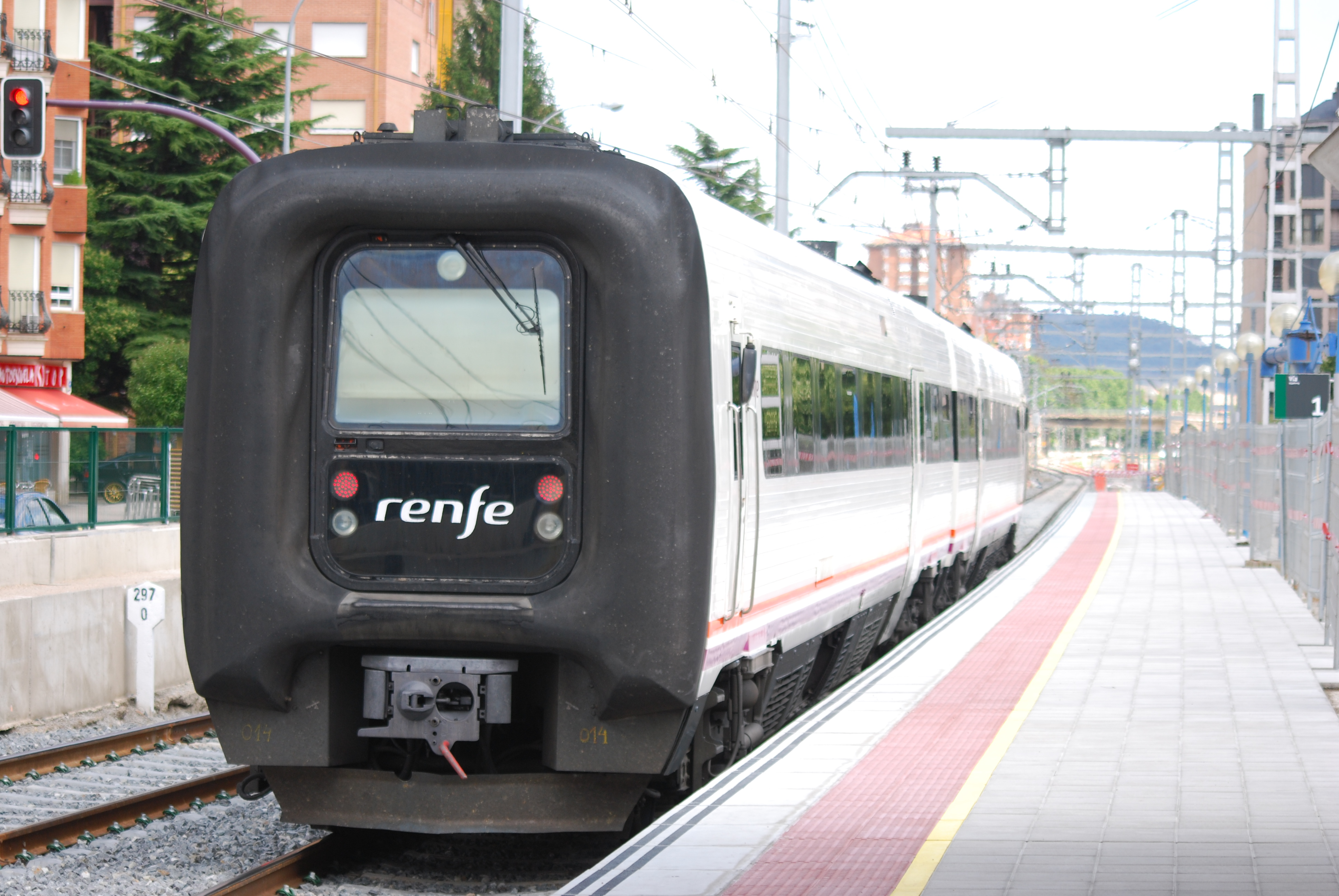
Renfe TRD at Palencia station

=== Class 594.2 ===
- Operator: Renfe
- Number built: 2
- Unit nos.: 594.201-594.202
- Notes: Converted from 594.0. Built with variable gauge capability
- Models:
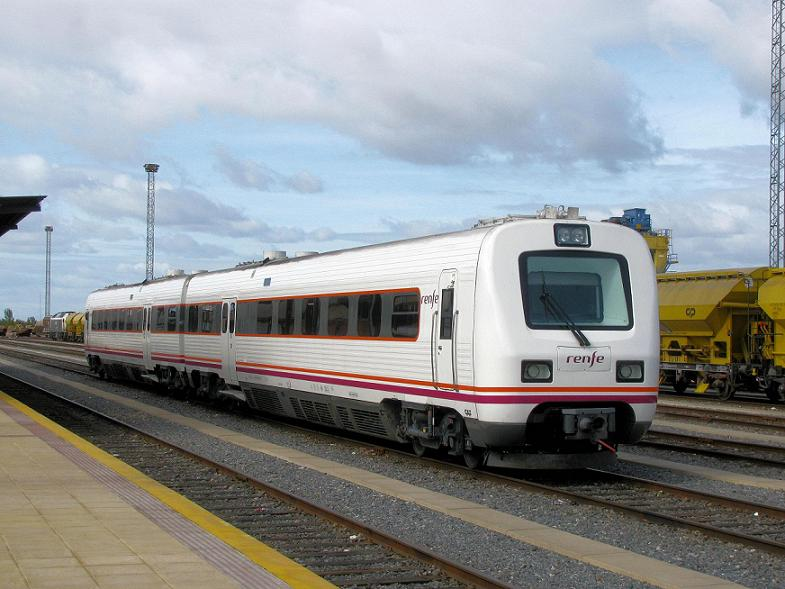
Renfe Class 594, TRD refurbished IC3

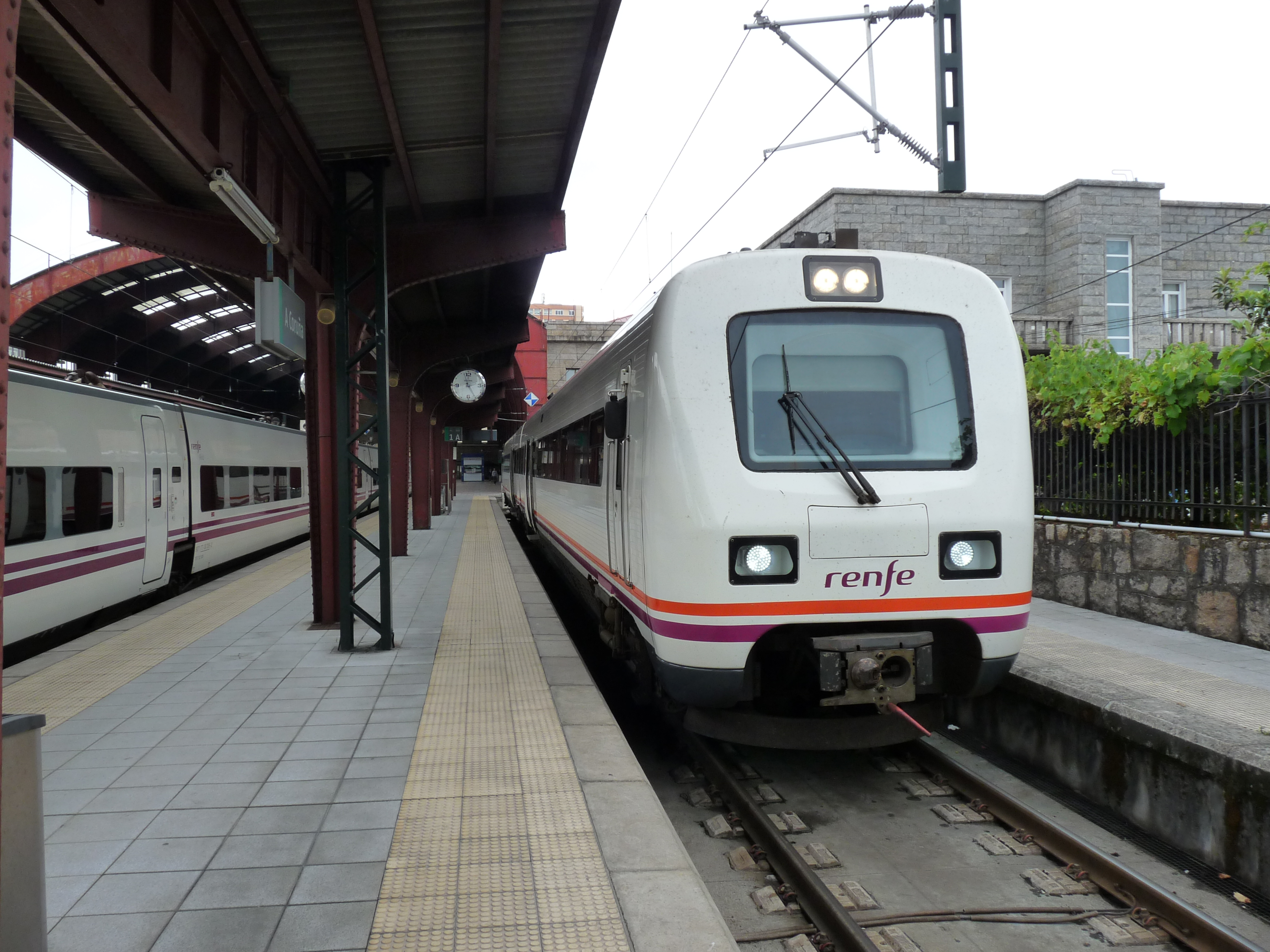
Renfe Class 594, TRD at Coruña station

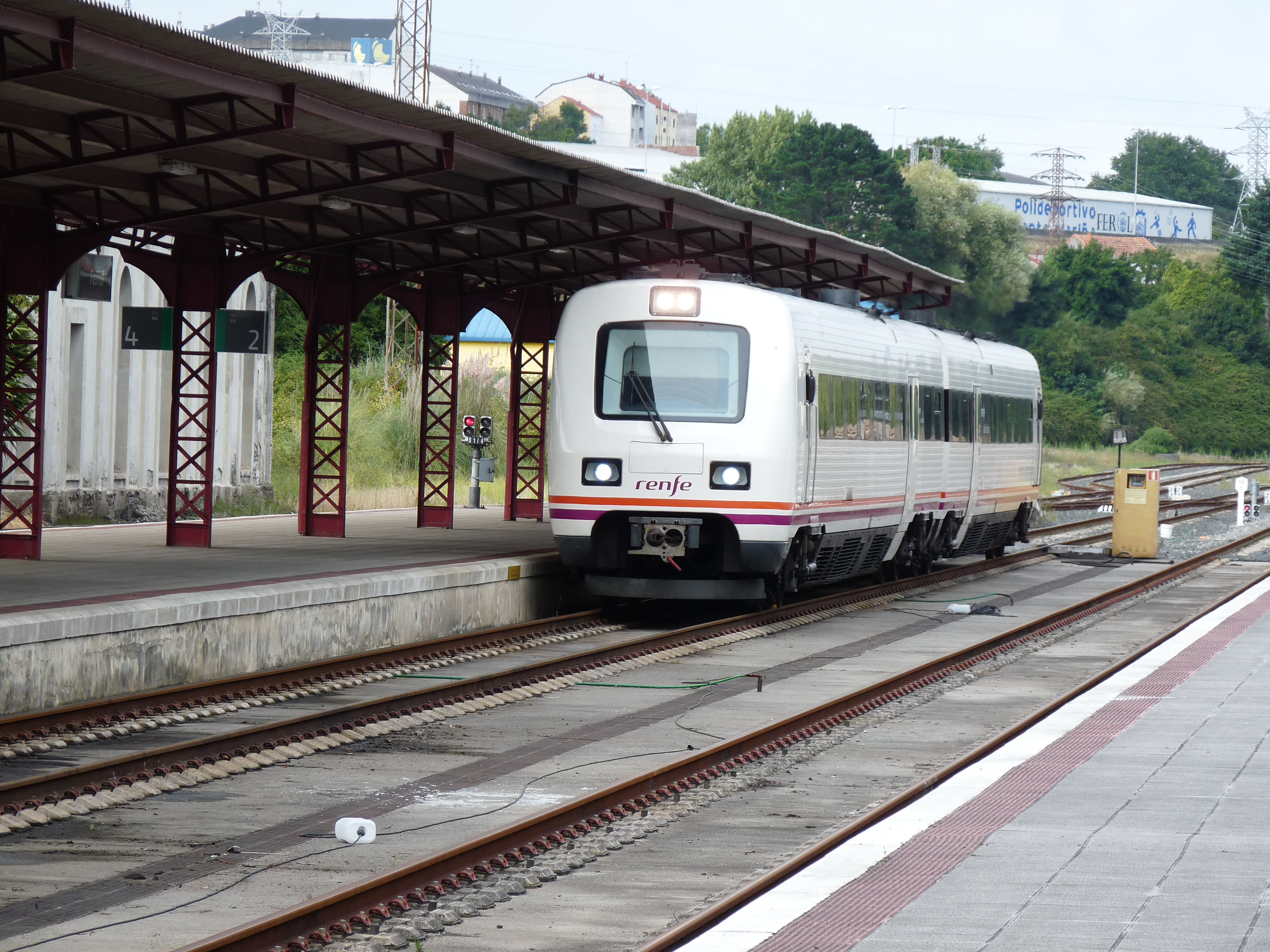
Renfe Class 594, TRD at Ferrol station

=== Israeli IC3 ===
- Operator: Israel Railways
- Number built: 10
- Year built: 1992
- Cars per set: 3
- Unit nos.: 01-10, 188-7009, 6072, 7020-7090, 7217-7250
- Notes: Built with PZB (Required in Israel) and returned to Randers, Denmark.
- Models:
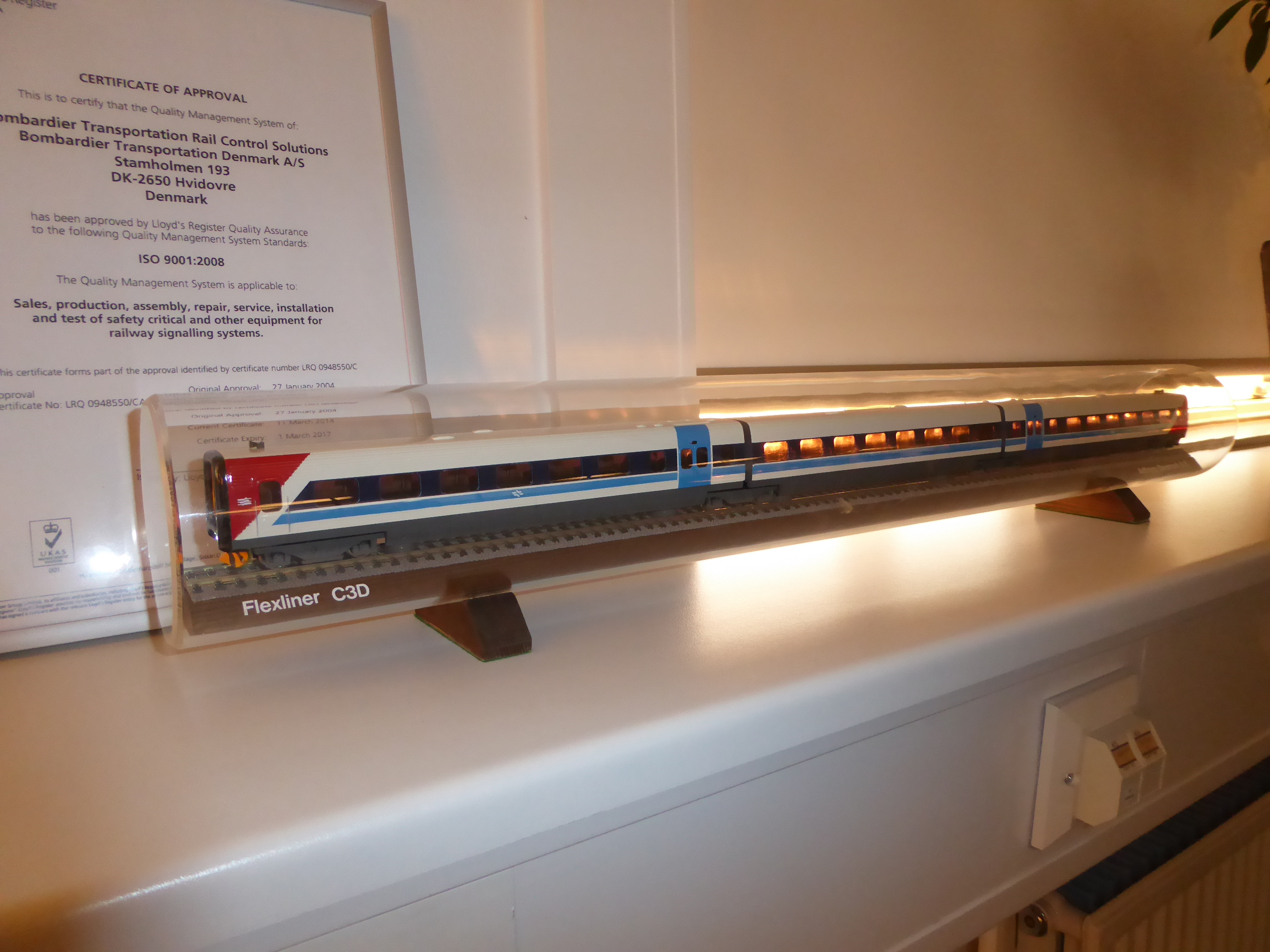
Models of trains from Bombardier - IC3 for Israel, Israeli IC3, Israel Railways

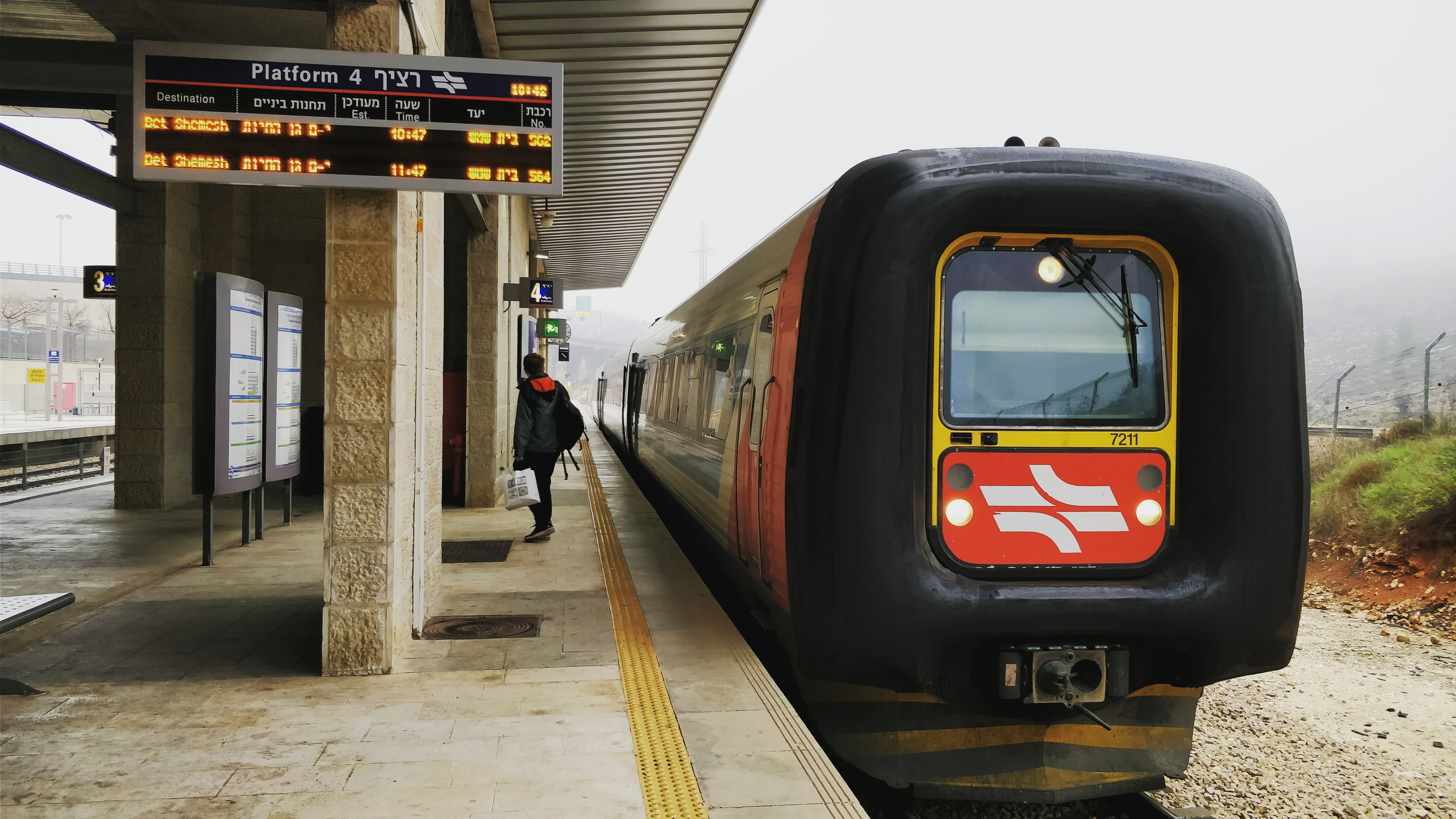
IC3 train towards Beit Shemesh at Jerusalem Malcha train station

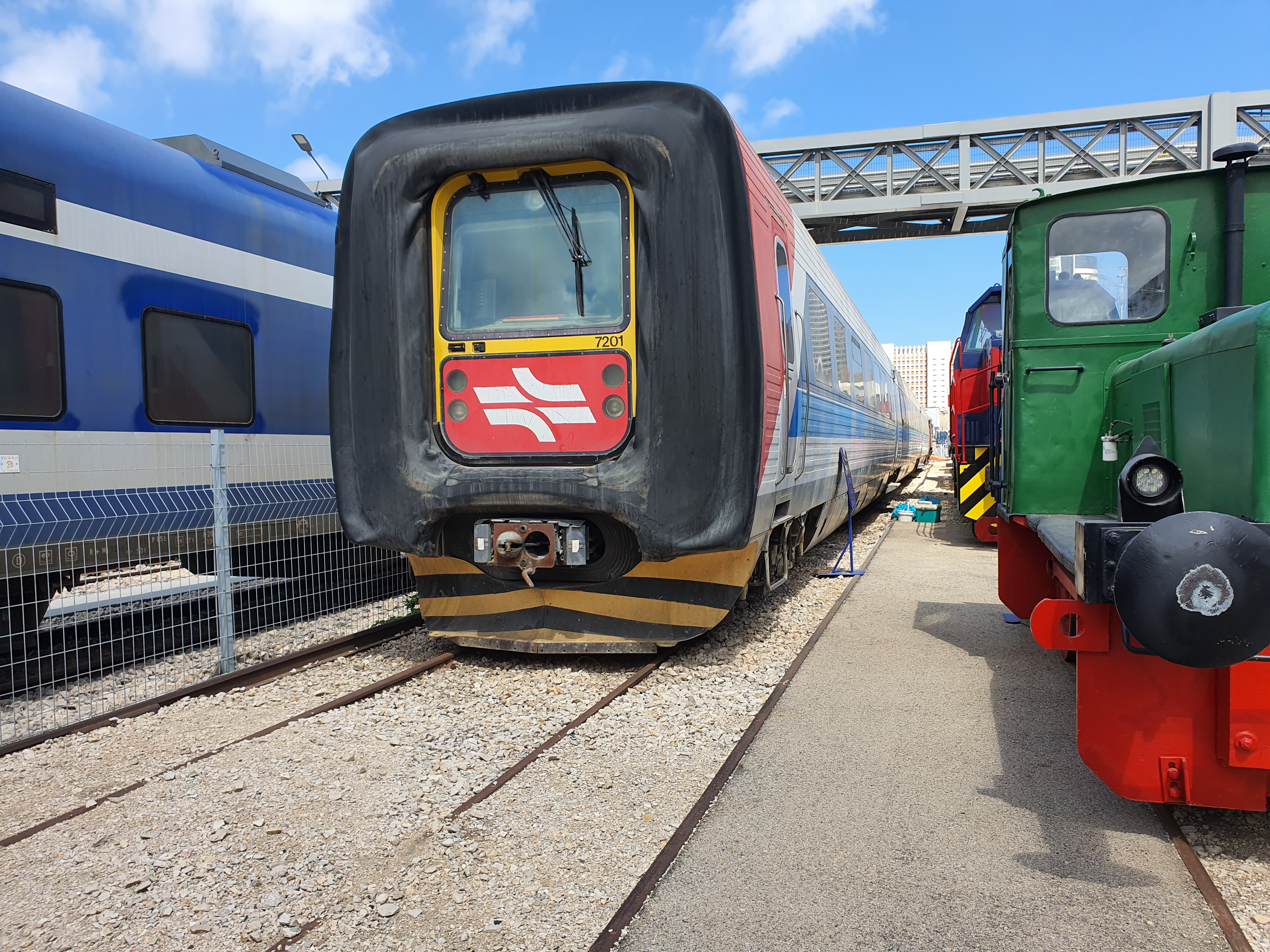
Israel Railways ABB Scandia IC3 no. 7201; as the first IC3 in Israel Railways service, it was preserved in the Israel Railway Museum rather than being returned to Randers, Denmark

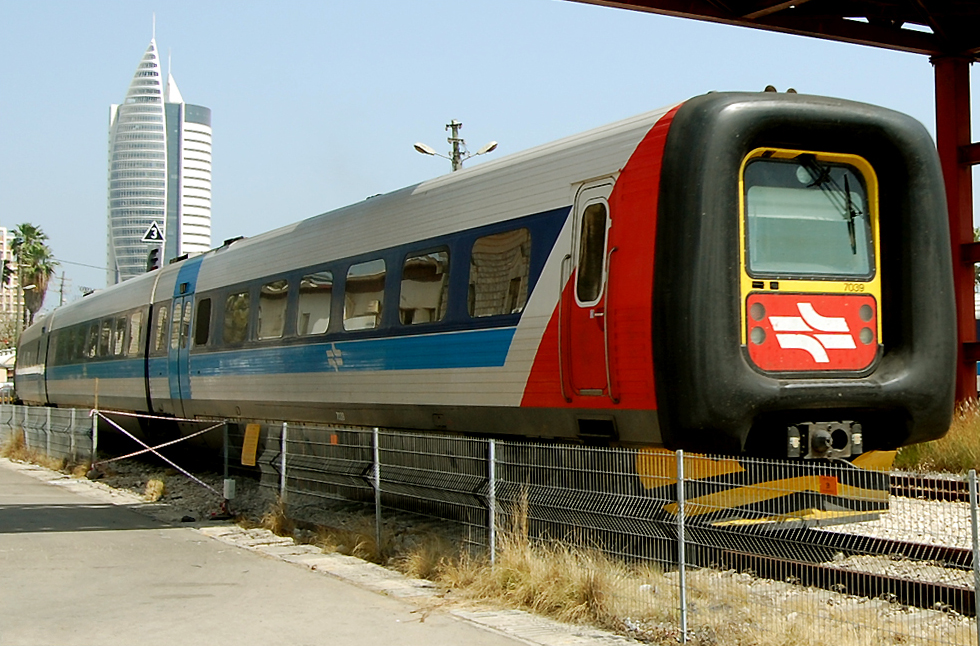
IC3 7039

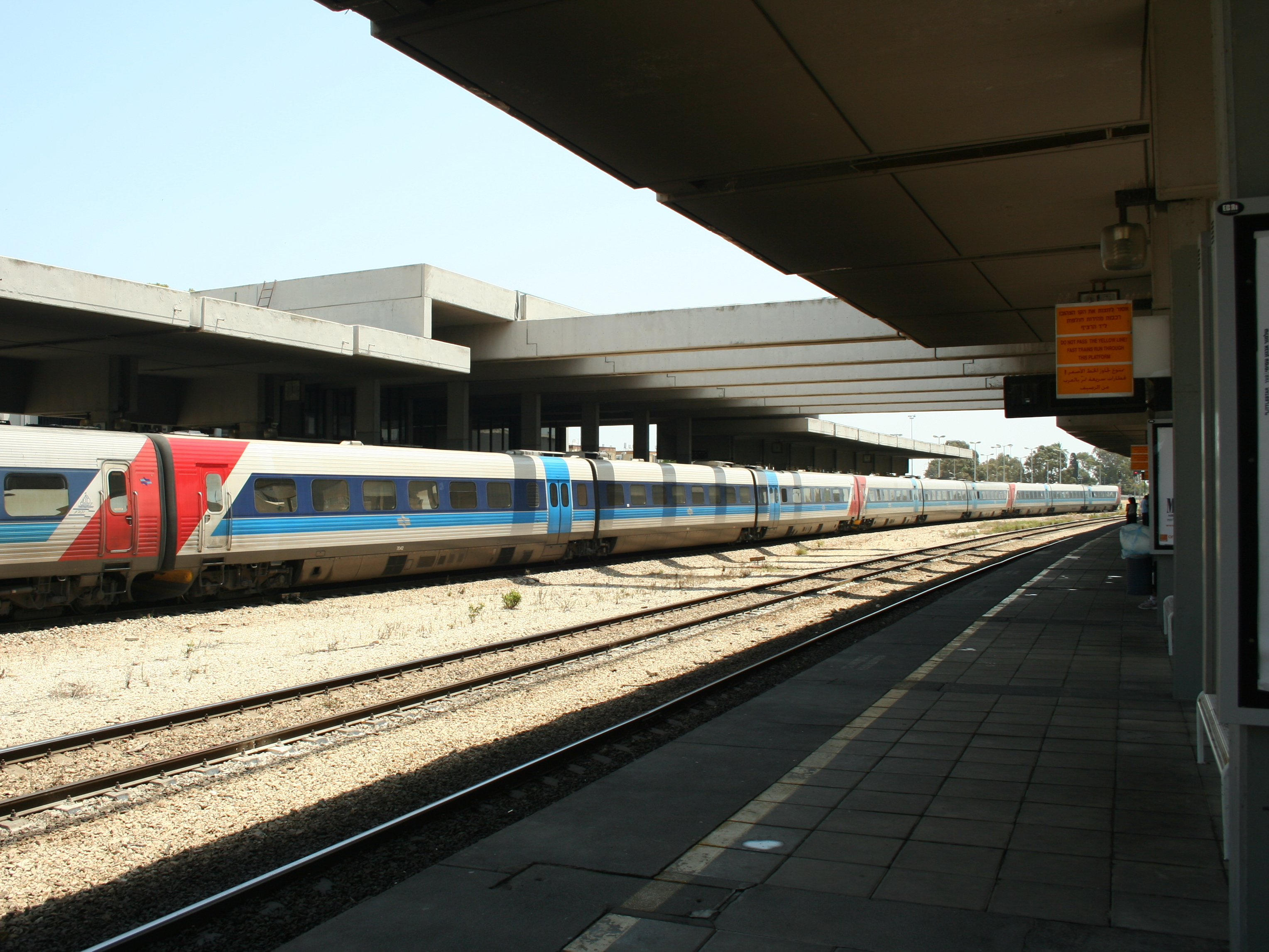
A IC3 train at Bat-galim platforms
- Number built: 31
- Year built: 1994–1996
- Unit nos.: 11-41
- Notes: Built with PZB (Required in Israel) in Dimona by RAMTA and returned to Randers, Denmark.
- Models:
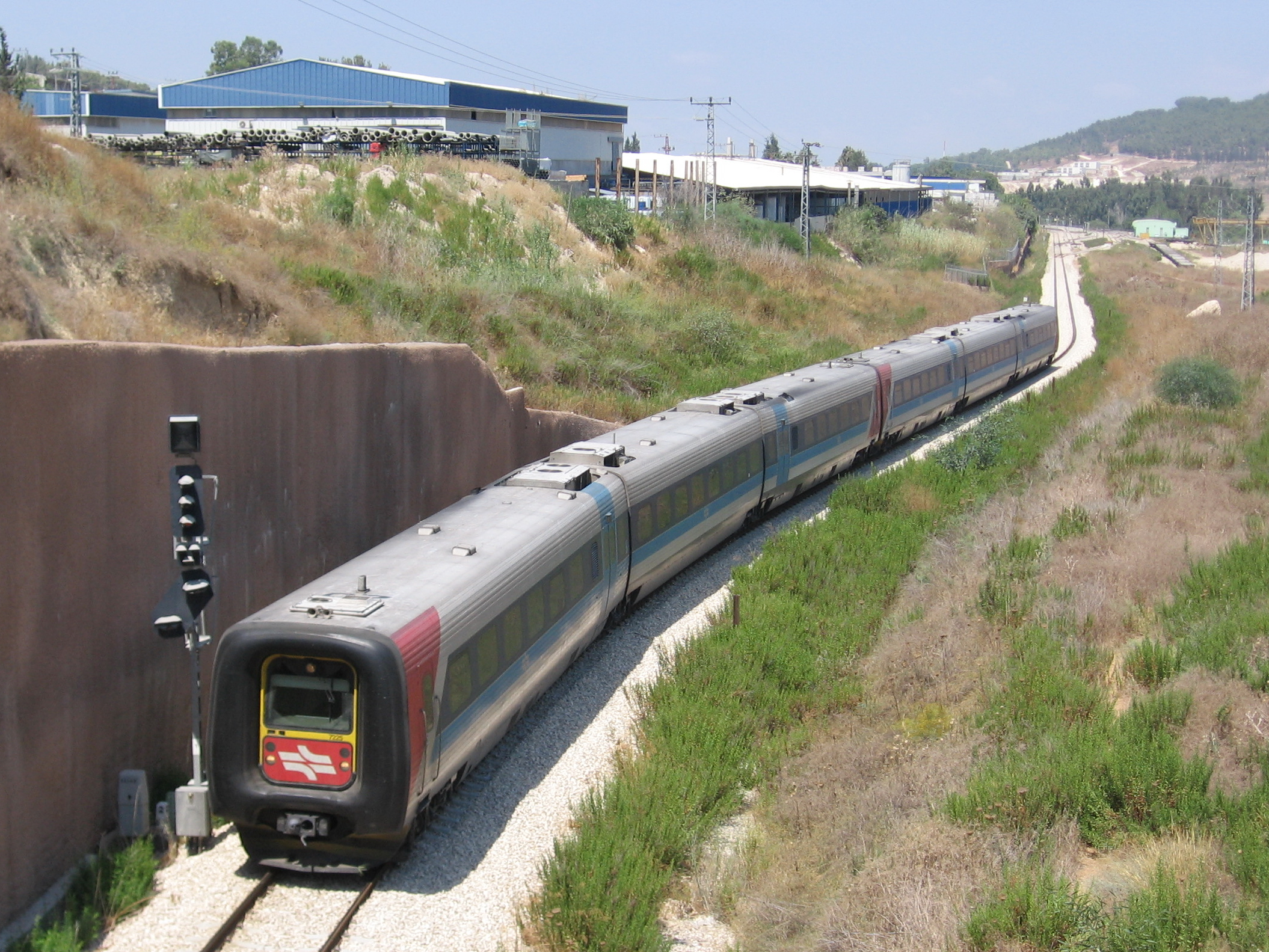
Israel Railways IC3 on the now-retired old line to Jerusalem, 2006

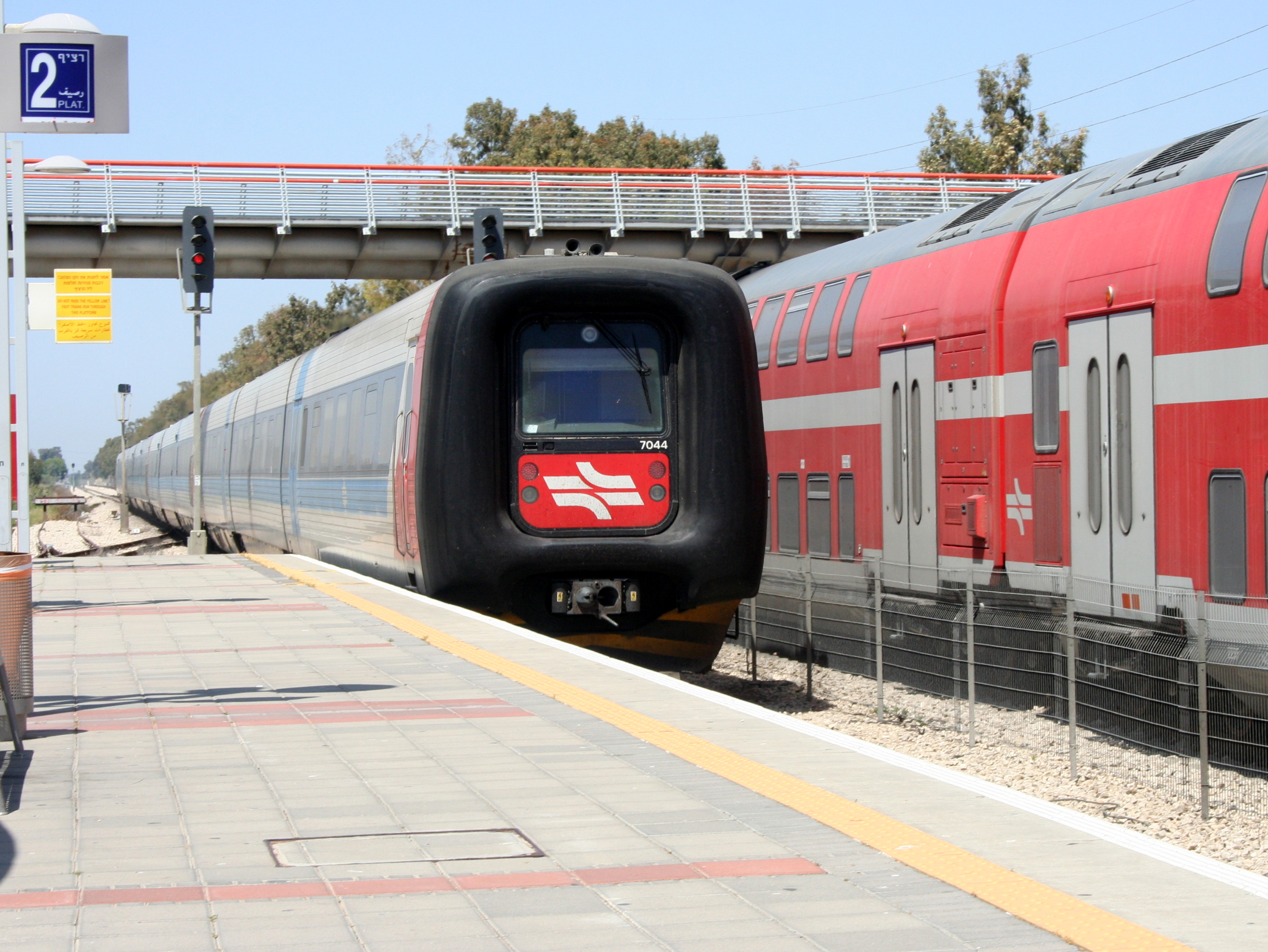
IC3, Herzelia

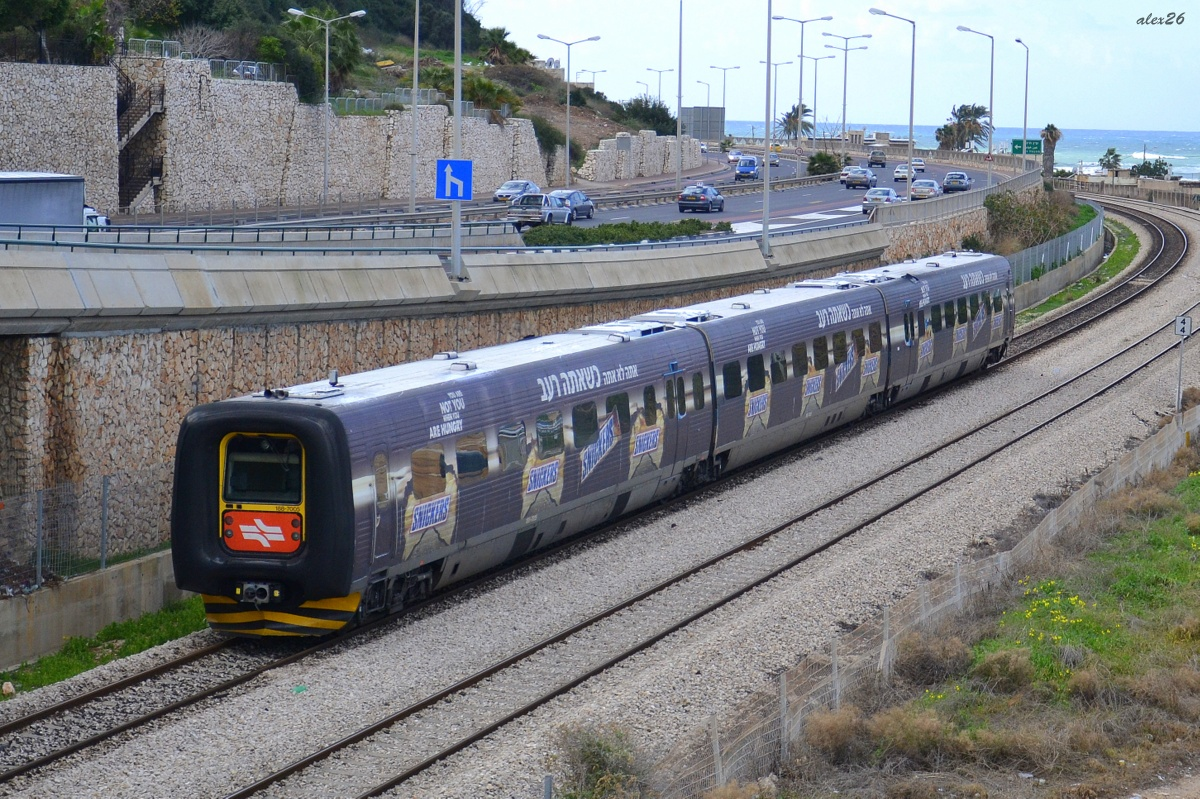
IC3 7005-7405-7205, train 33687, Israel, Haifa, distillation of Hof Ha-Carmel - Bat-Galim

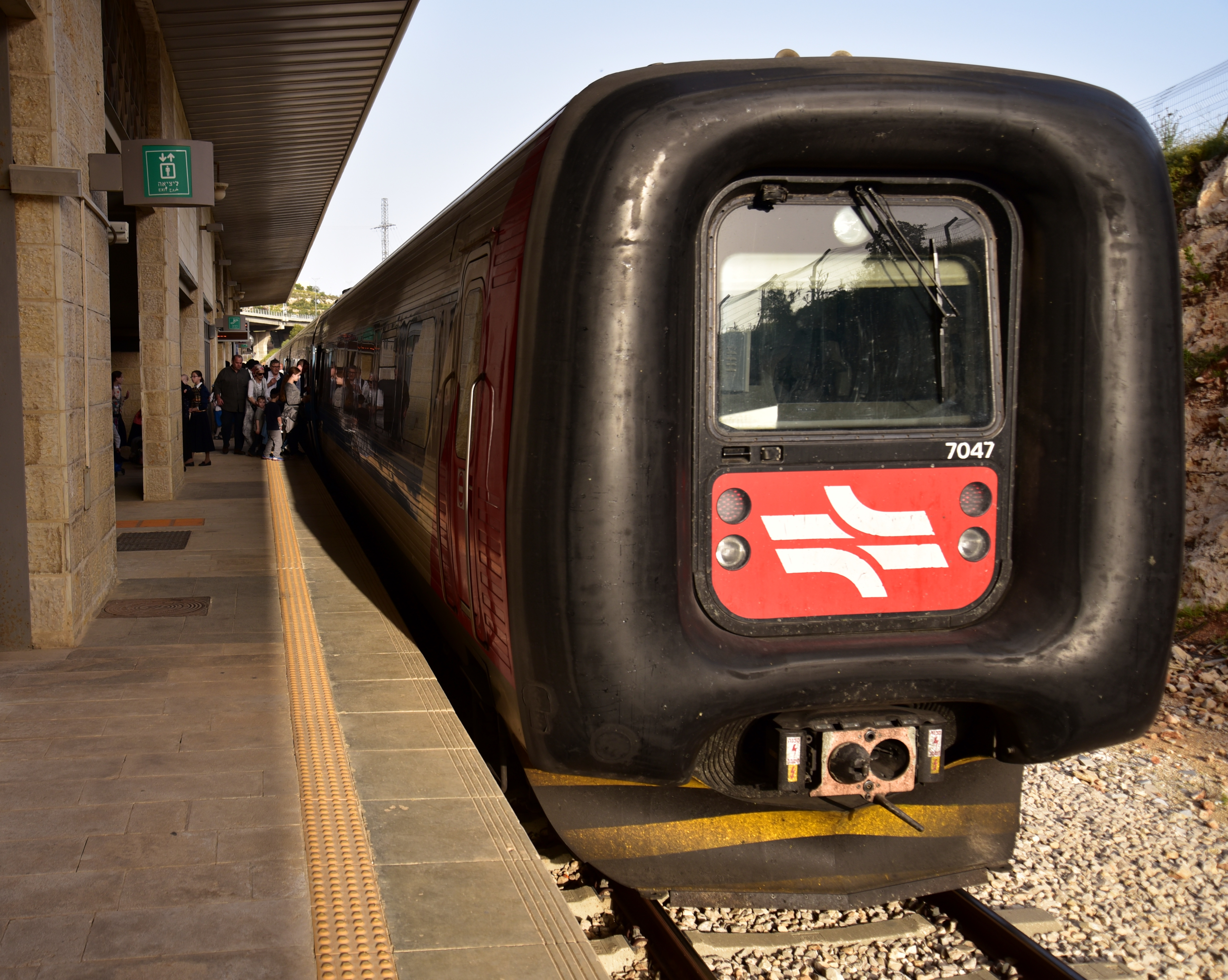
Israel Railways IC3 47, Jerusalem–Malha

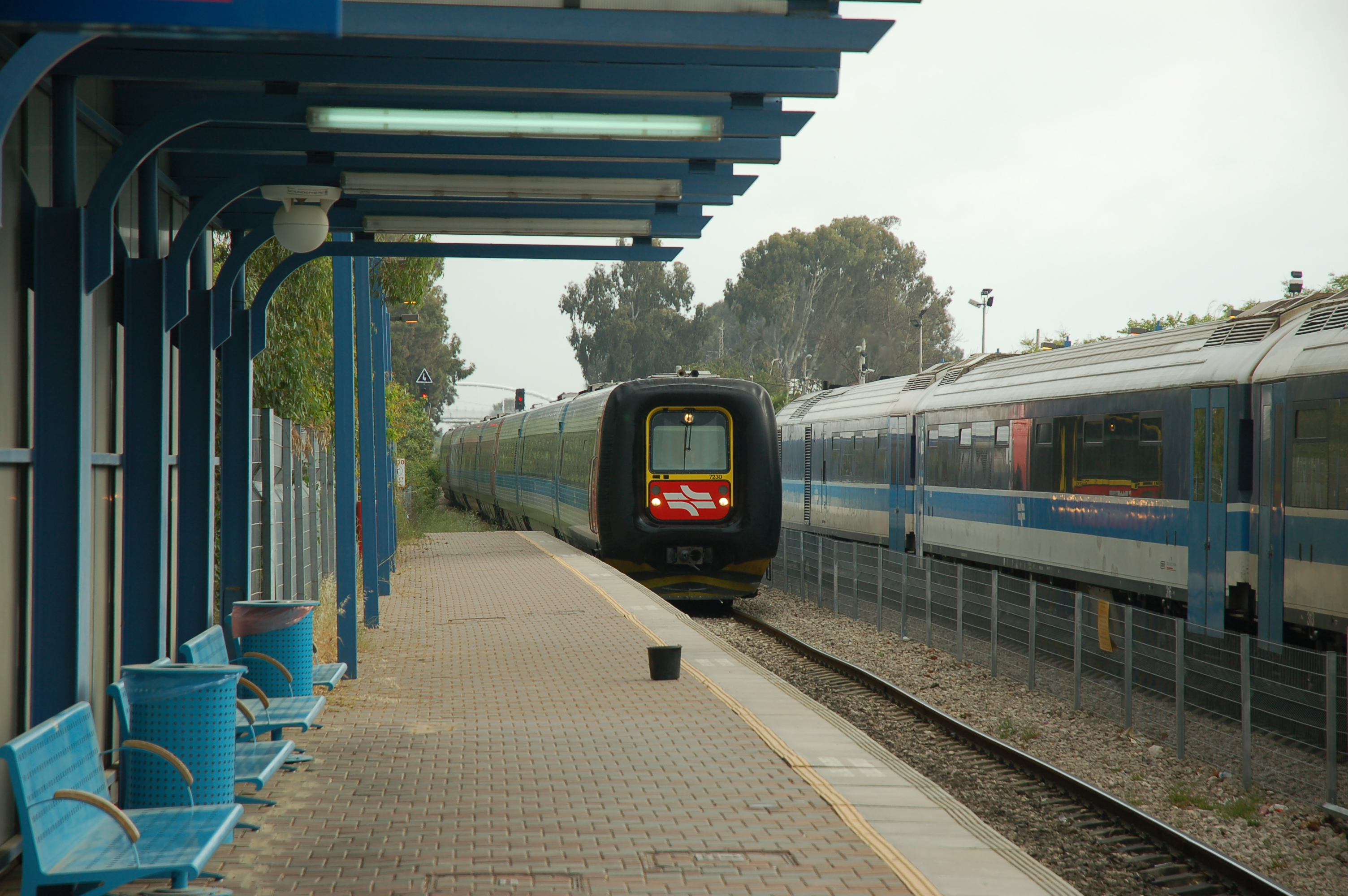
IC3 train at Nahariyya station

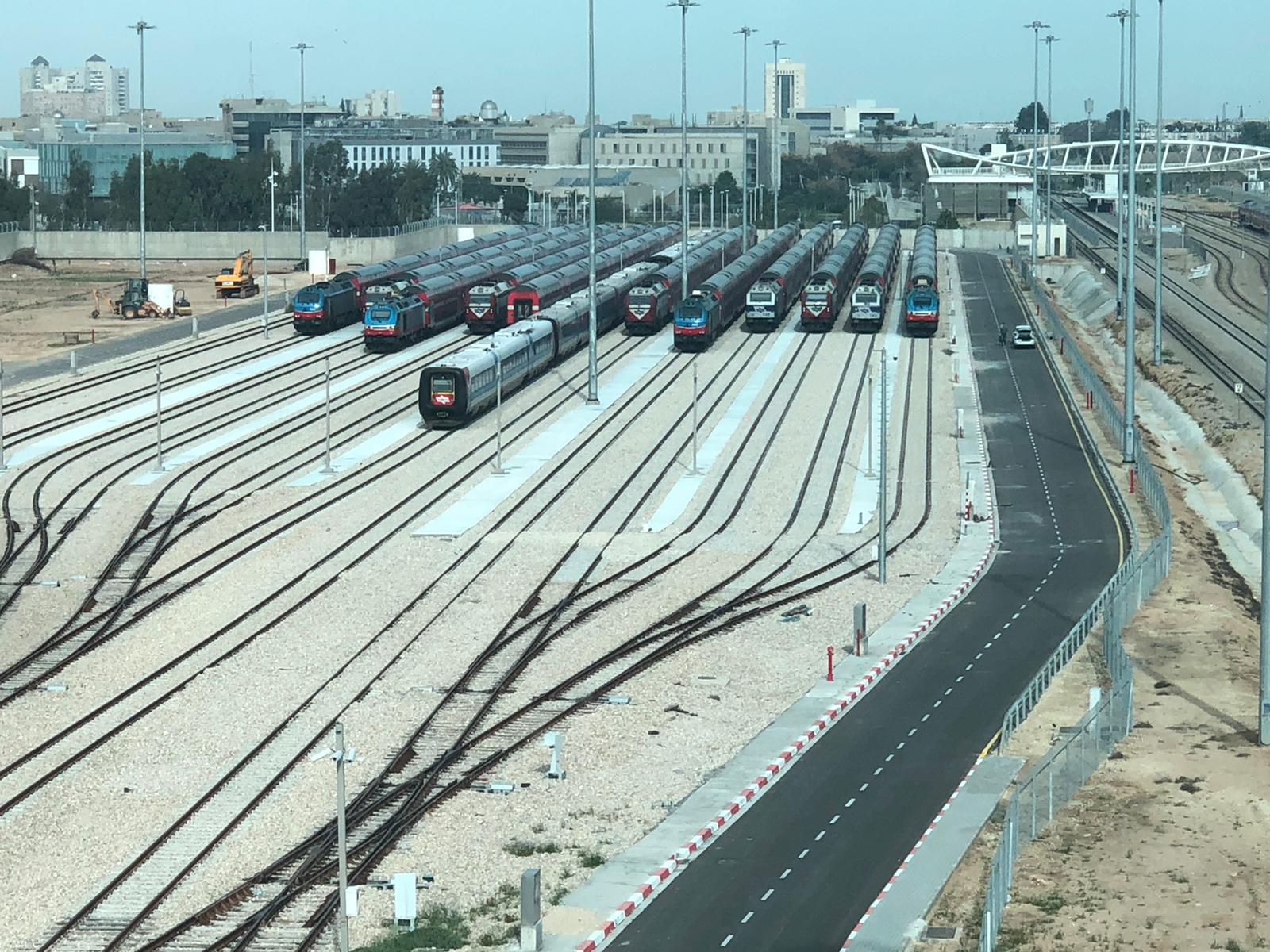
A IC3 train at Beersheba stabling yard
- Number built: 9
- Year built: 1990
- Unit nos.: 42-50
- Notes: Purchased from SJ. Entered service 2005. Fitted with PZB (Required in Israel) and returned to Randers, Denmark.
- Models:
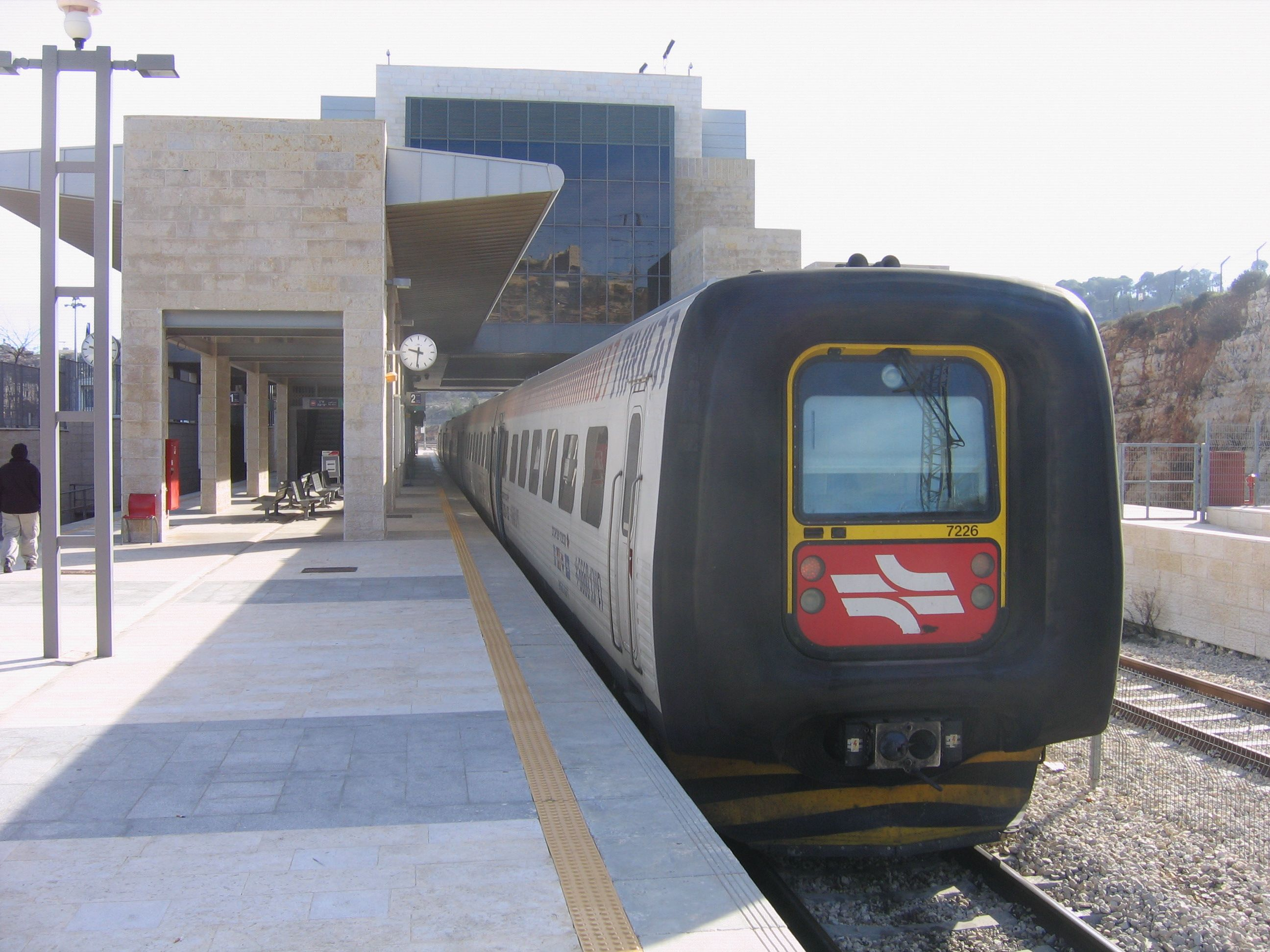
Jerusalem-Malha

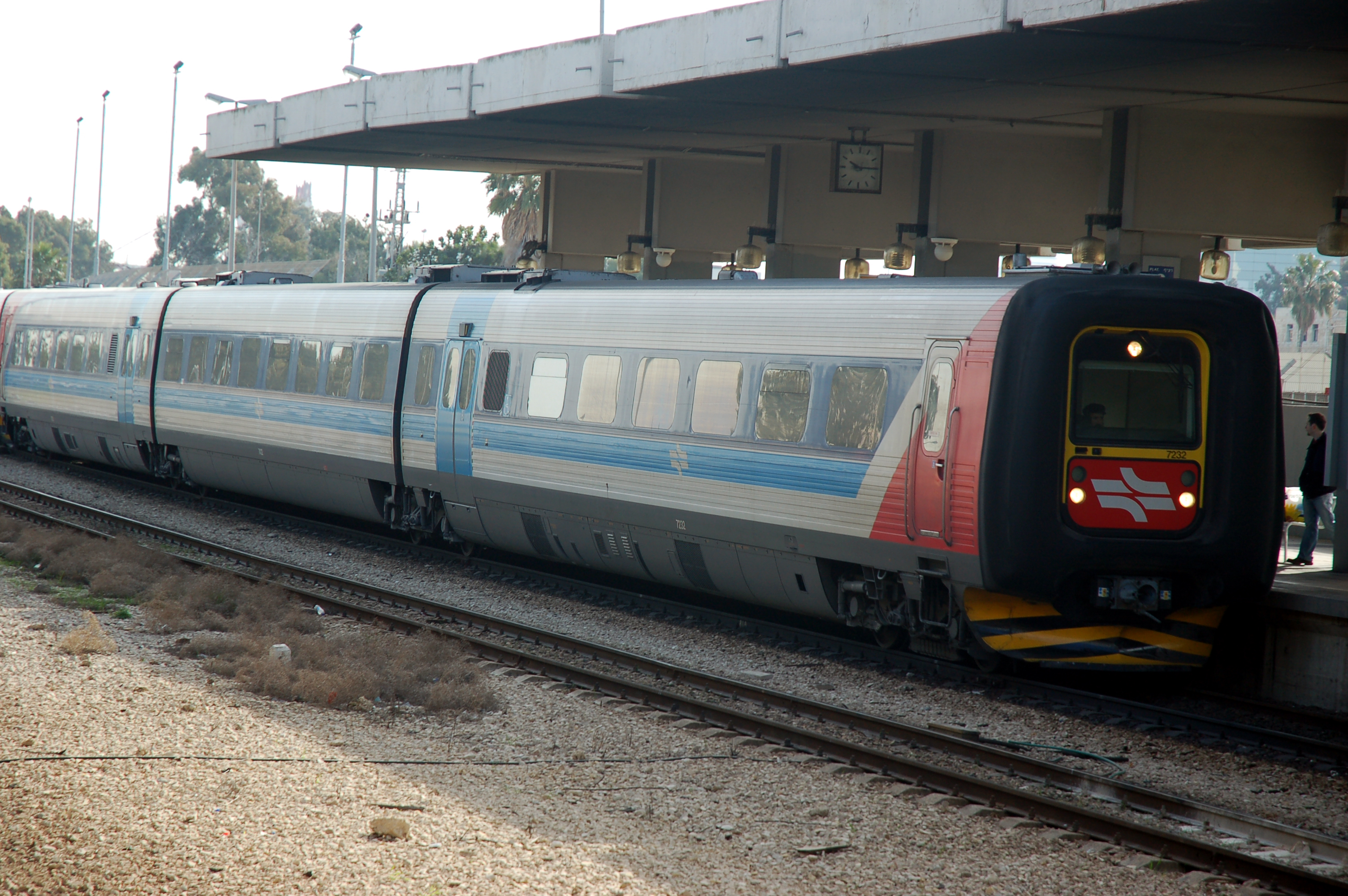
Bat Galim station

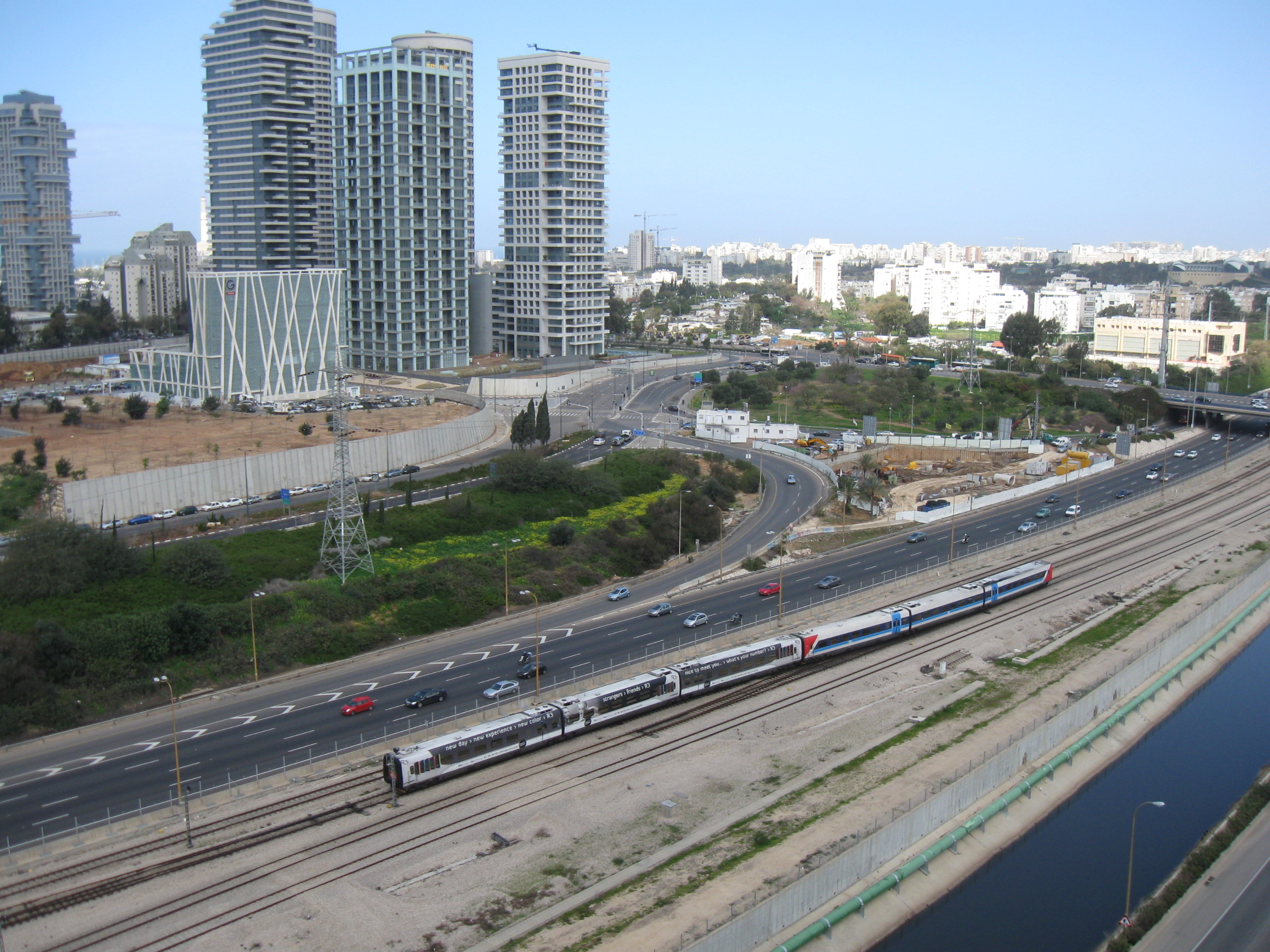
Two units of IC3 train interconnected

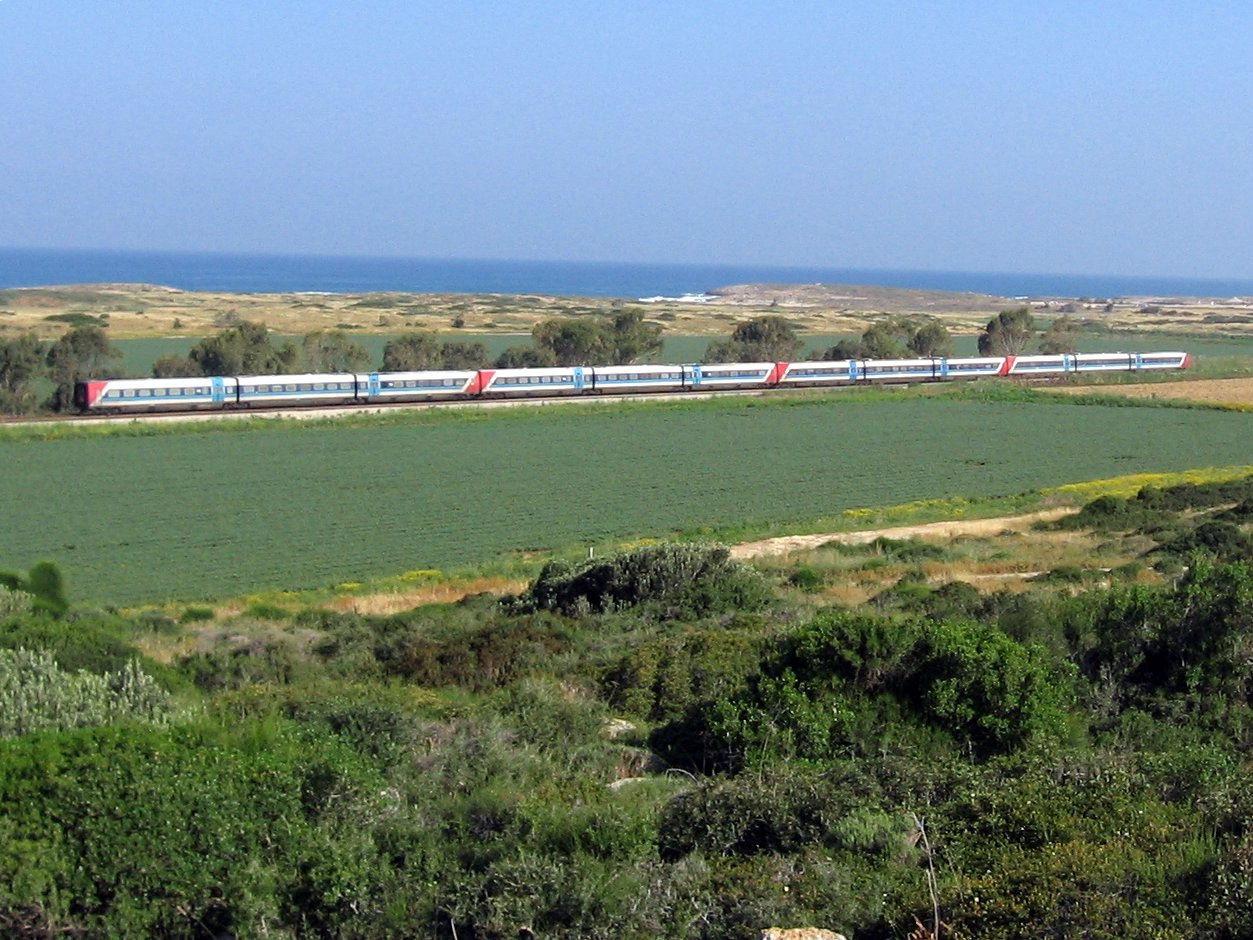
Four units of IC3 train interconnected

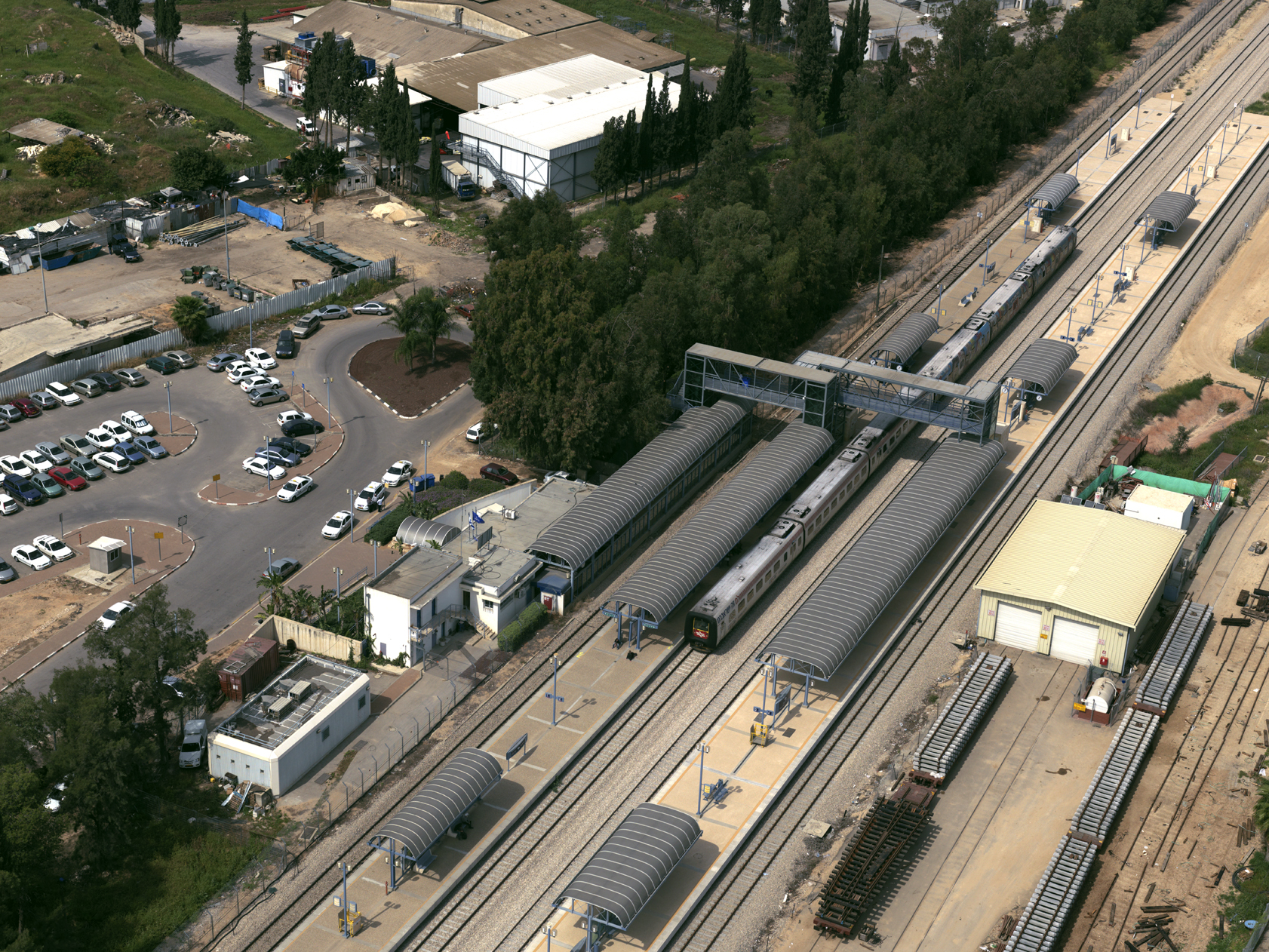
IC3 16204

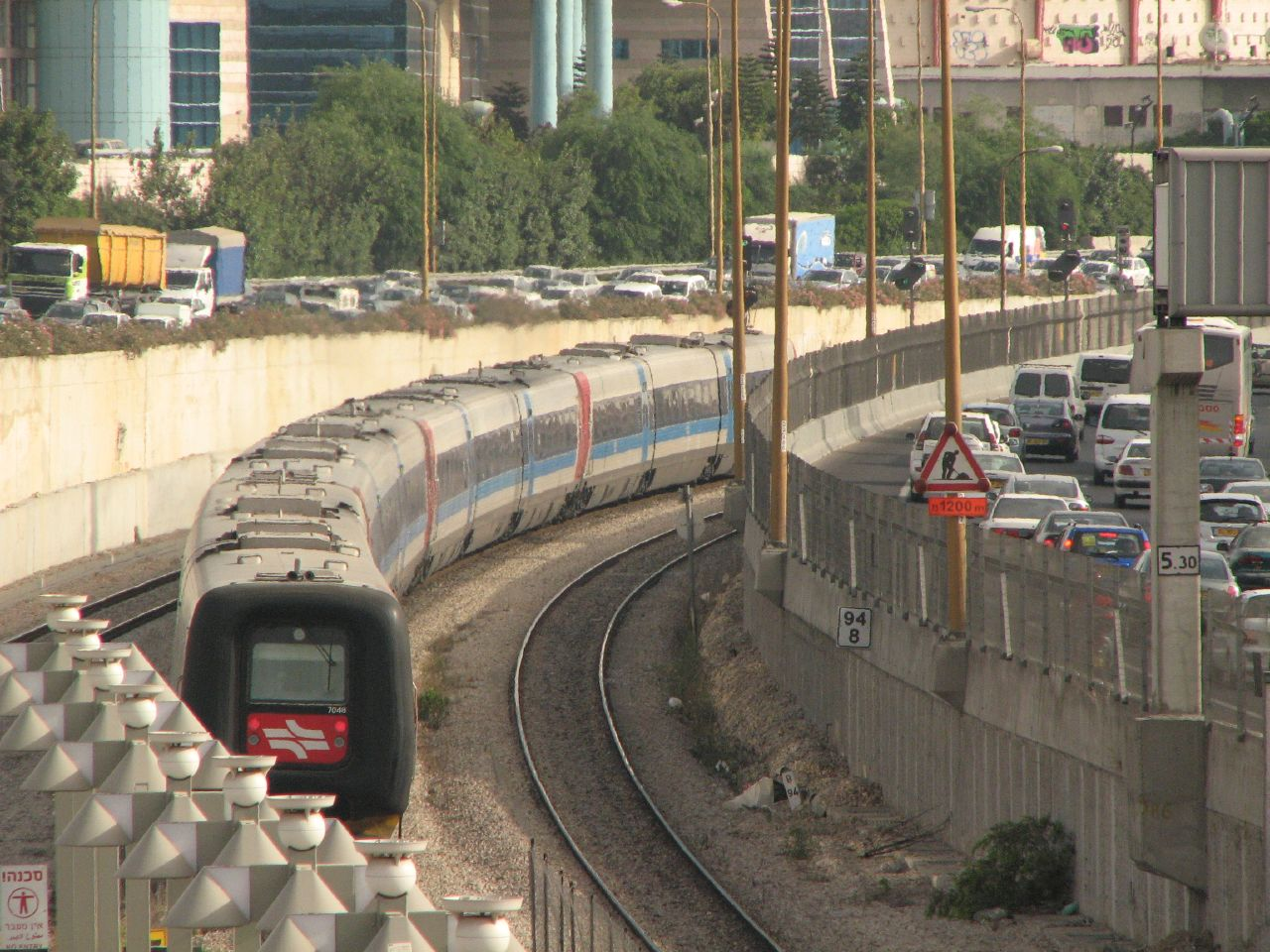
Israel Railways, IC3

=== Y2 ===
- Operator: Kalmar länstrafik/Transdev
- Number built: 6
- Cars per set: 3
- Unit nos.: 1367–1386
- Notes: Early on owned by SJ. 14 more have been sold to The Israel Railways or some scrapped and 1367-1371 returned to Randers, Denmark and 1372-1386 sold to The Israel Railways.
- Models:
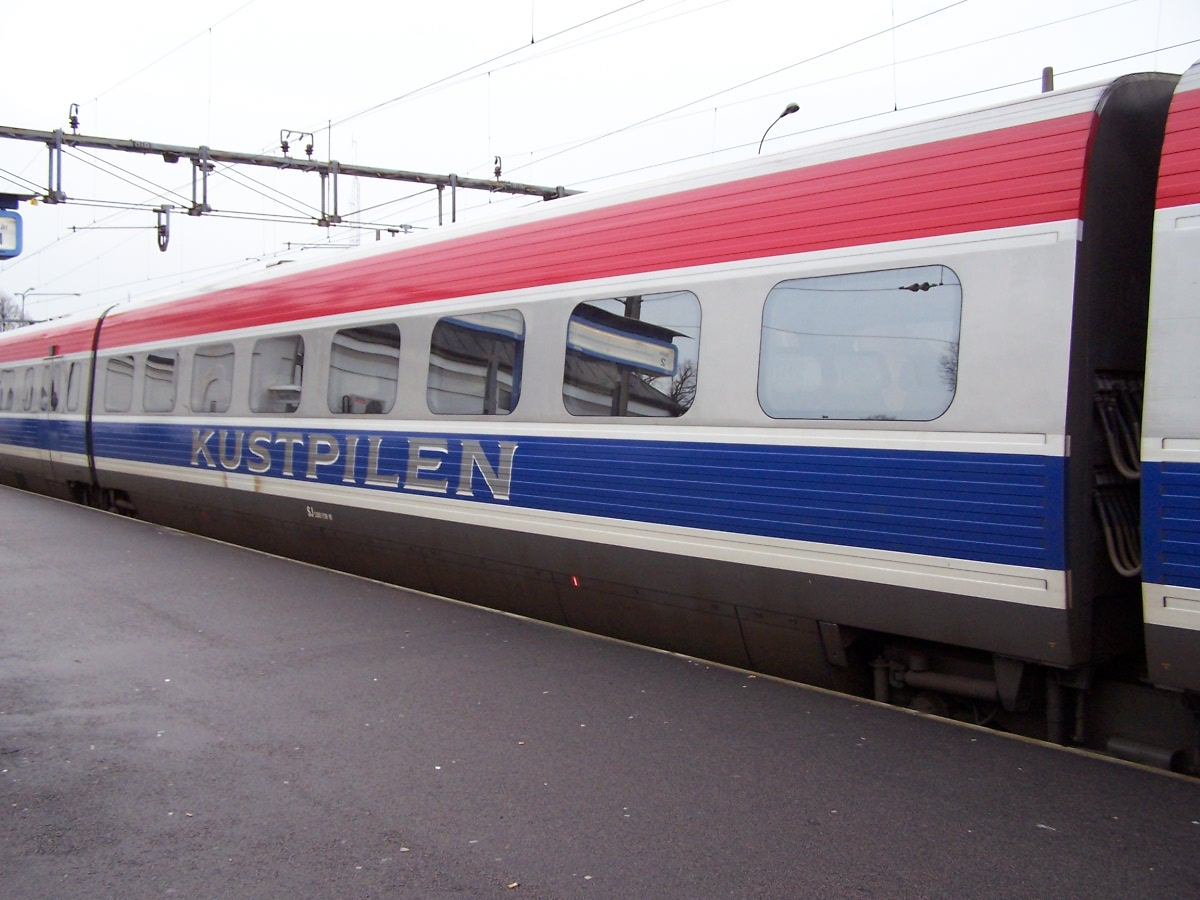
Swedish (Kustpilen Y2) IC3

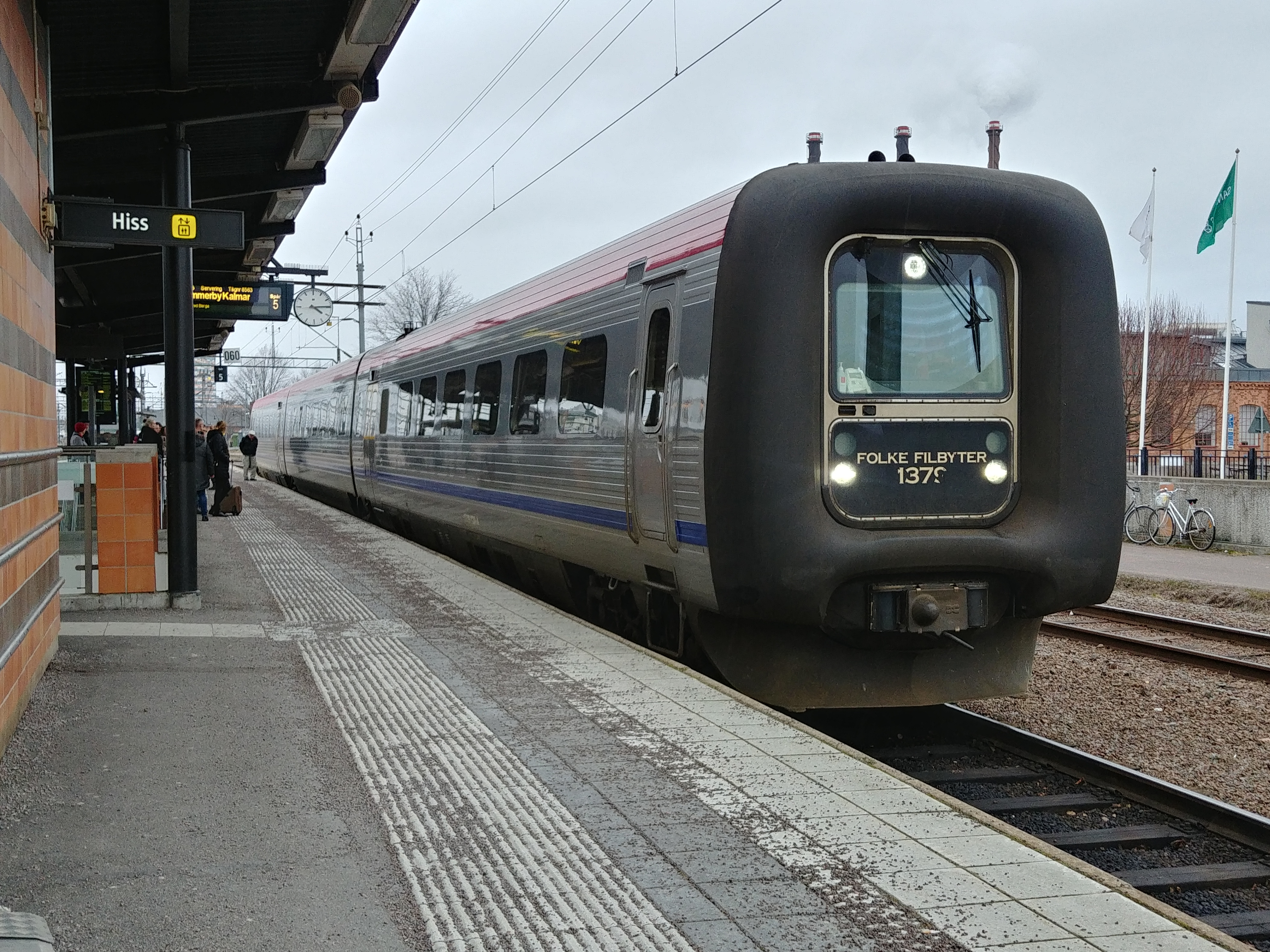
Bombardier Y2 Kalmar Länstrafik and Östgötatrafiken 1379

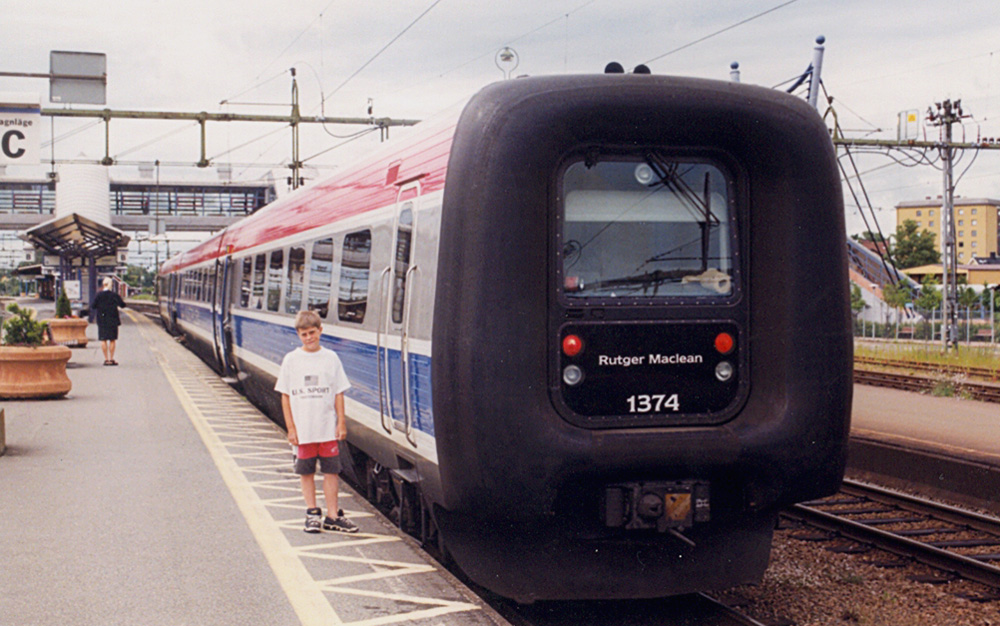
Y2 IC3 Hässleholm - Helsingborg

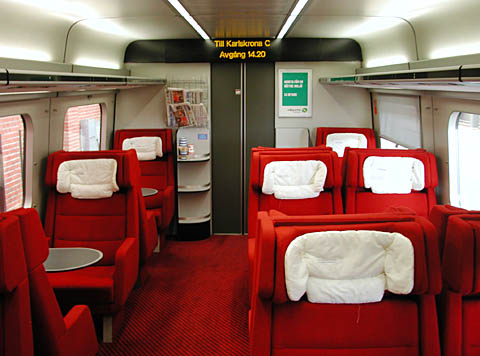
Interior for first class Kustpilen

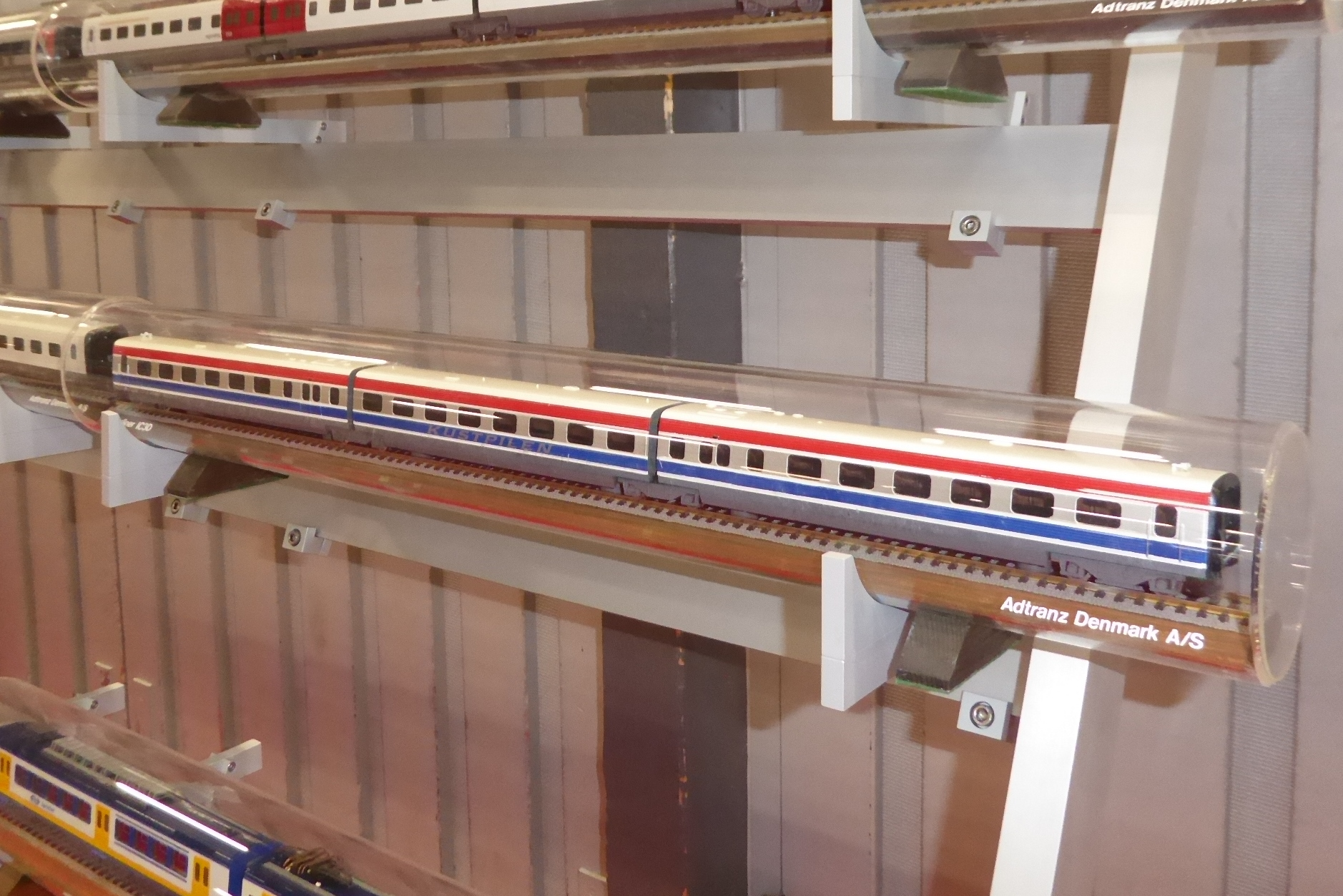
A model of (Kustpilen Y2) IC3

=== VIA ===
- Operator: Via Rail
- Number built: 2
- Year built: 1996-1997
- Cars per set: 3
- Unit nos.: 7002-7203
- Notes: Some IC3 trains loaned from The Israel Railways (still bearing the logo of the Israel Ports and Railways Authority) and then returned to Israeli service. Eventually returned to Randers, Denmark.
- Models:
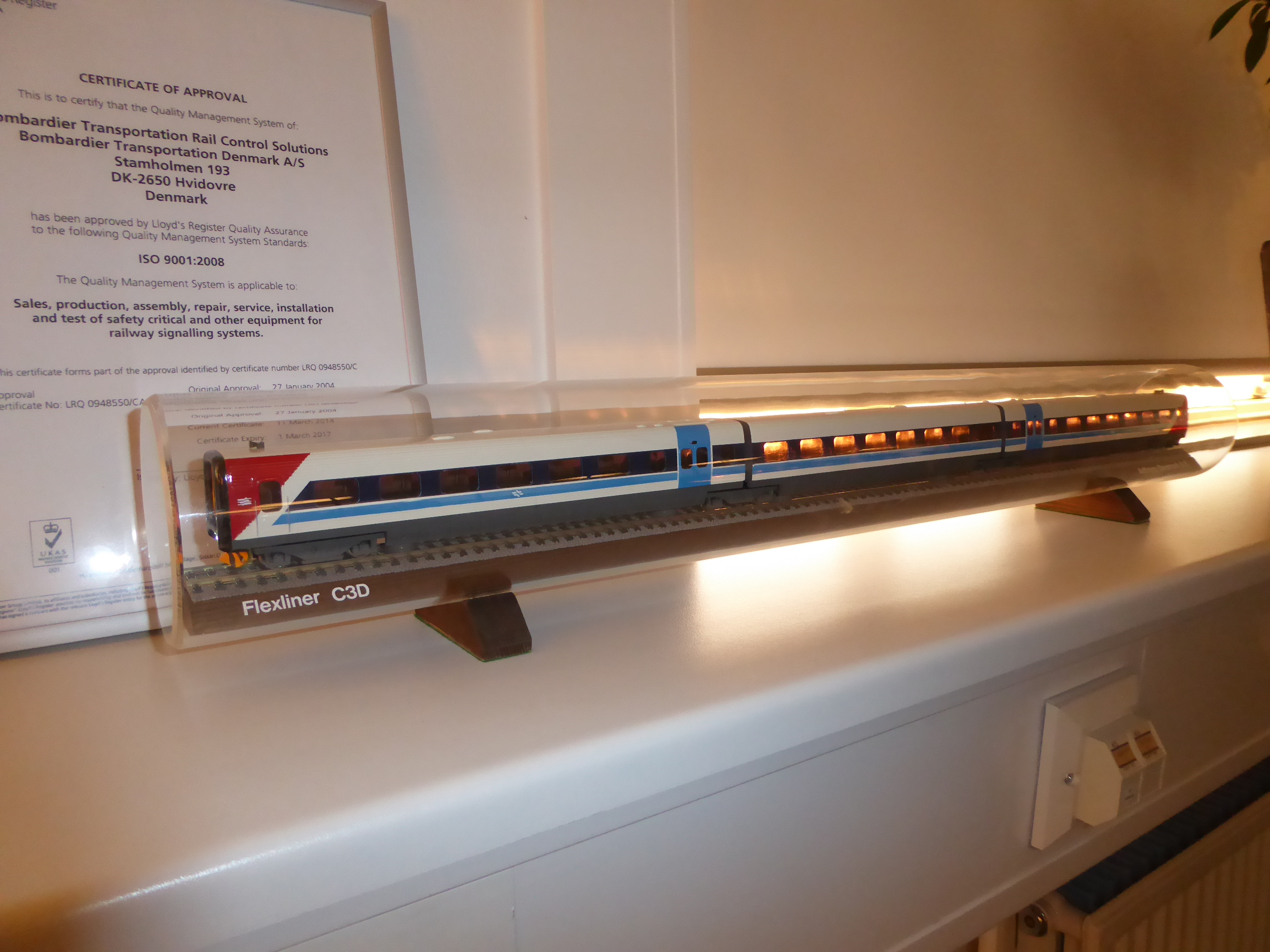
Models of trains from Bombardier - IC3 for Canada, Via Rail

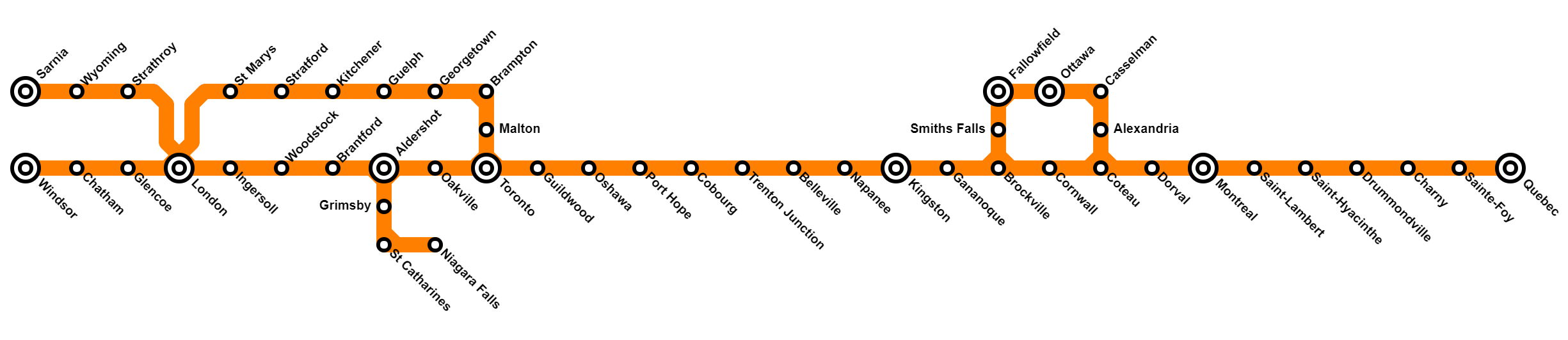
Via Rail Corridor Schematic Map

=== Amtrak ===
- Operator: Amtrak
- Number built: 2
- Year built: 1996/1997-2000
- Cars per set: 3
- Unit nos.: 7003-7201
- Models:
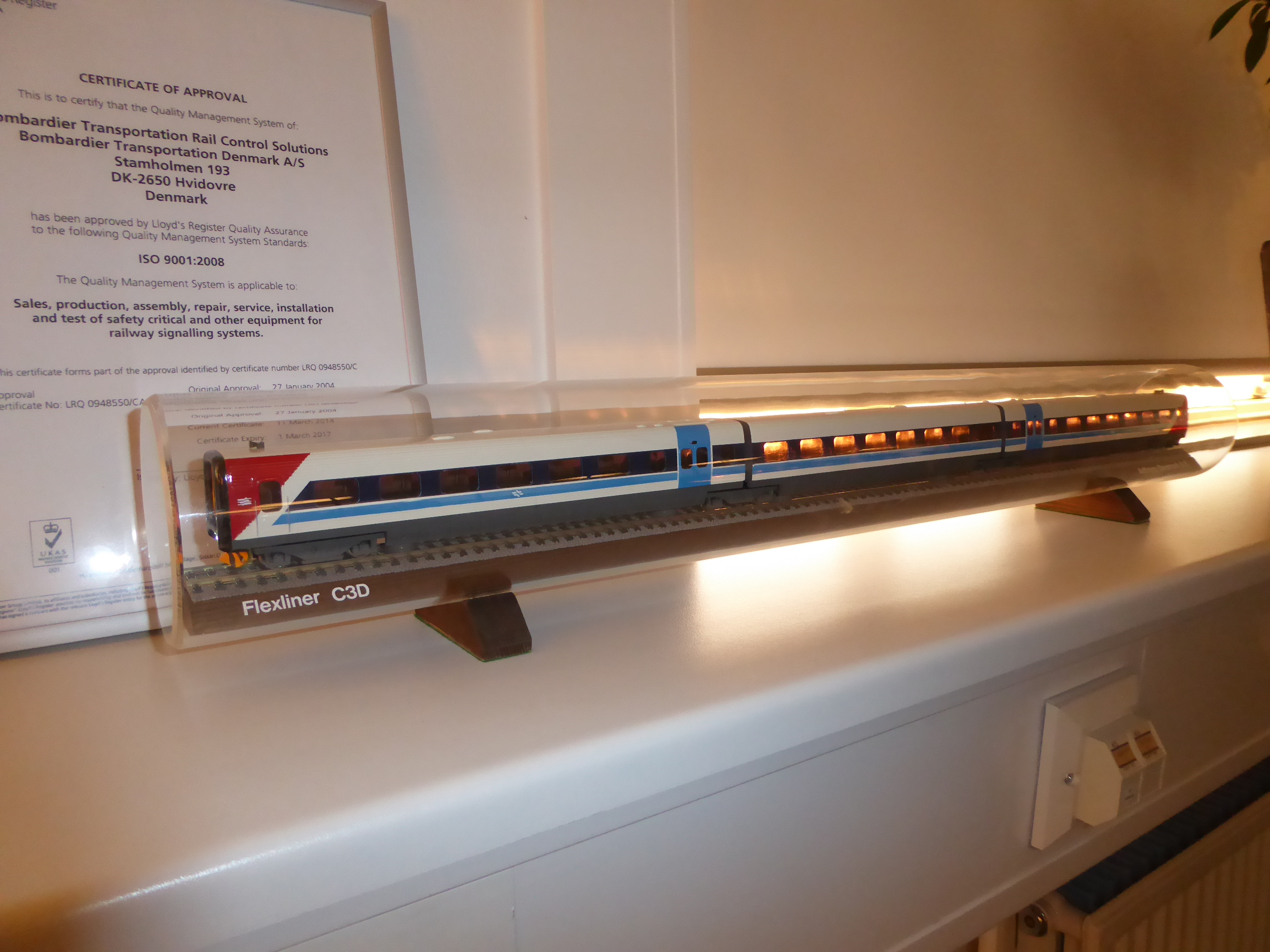
Models of trains from Bombardier - IC3 for USA, Amtrak

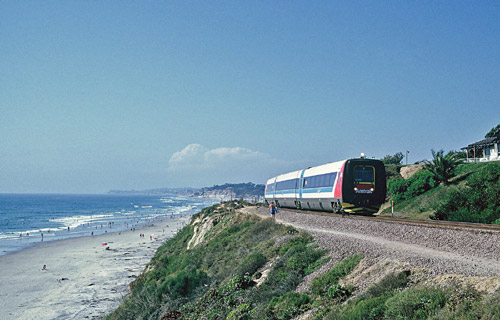
IC3 Amtrak San Diegan in Del Mar, July 19, 1996

== Danish derivatives ==
The IC3 has not only served as the backbone of the Danish InterCity concept since the 1990s; it has also served as the foundation and/or inspiration for three other trains. These are the IR4, the IC2, and the Øresundtrain.

=== IR4 "InterRegional 4" ===
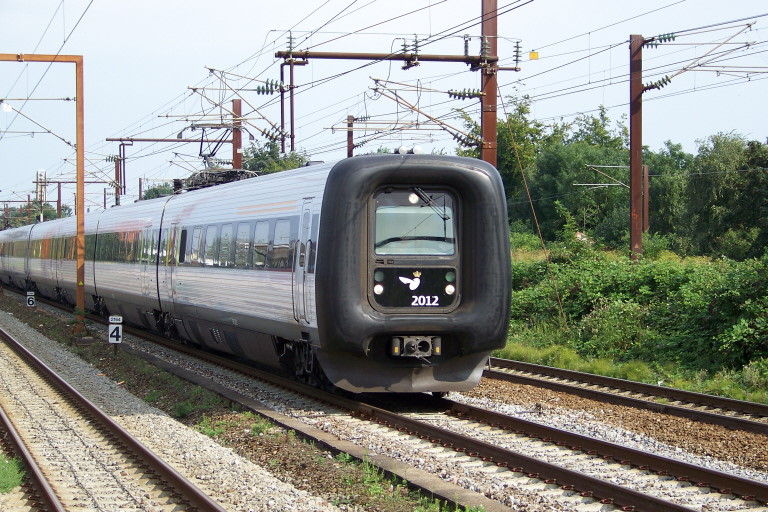
An IR4 train passing Hvidovre near Copenhagen

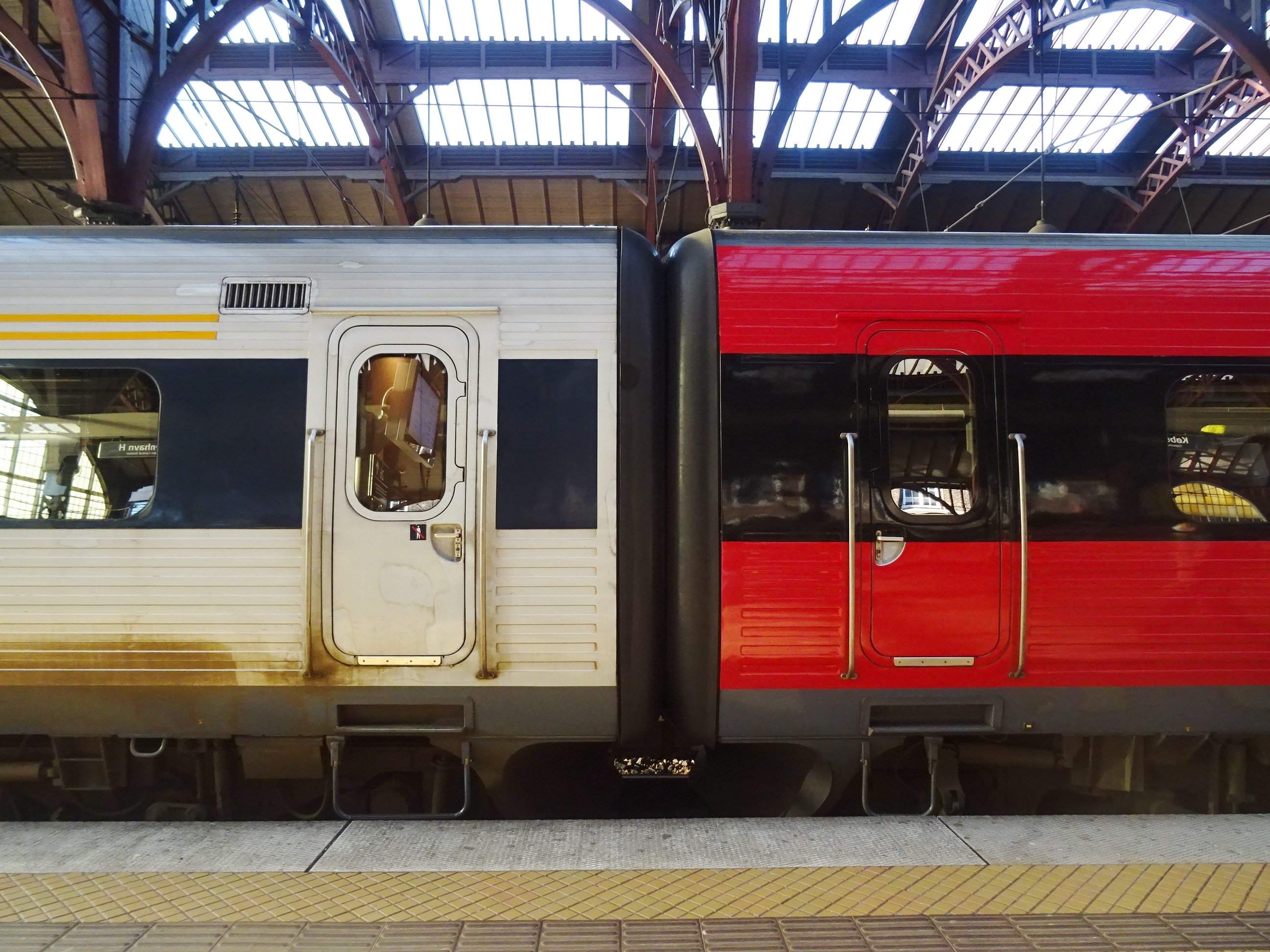
DSB IC3 74 and IR4 30 at Copenhagen Central Station

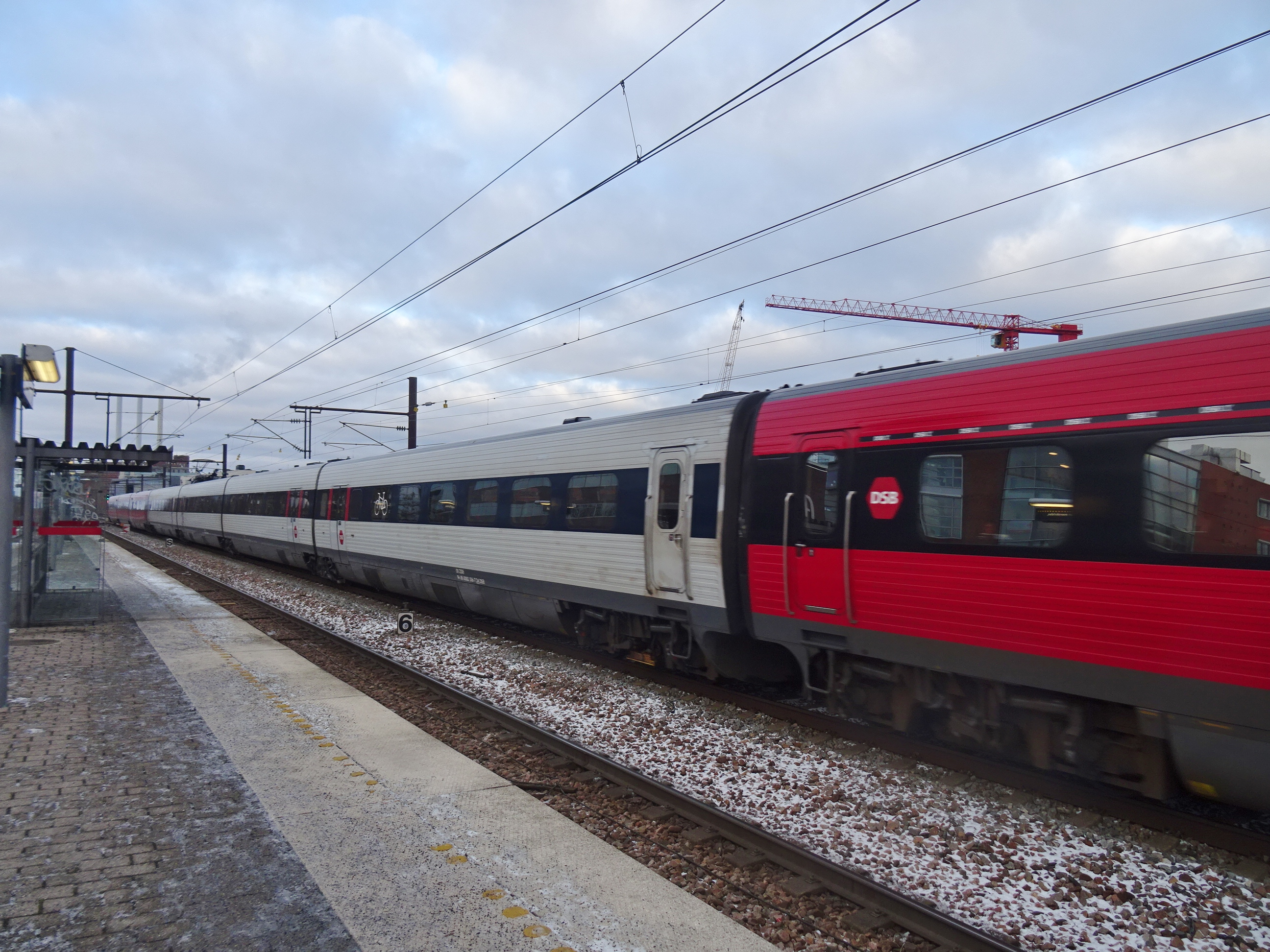
DSB IR4 at Nordhavn Station

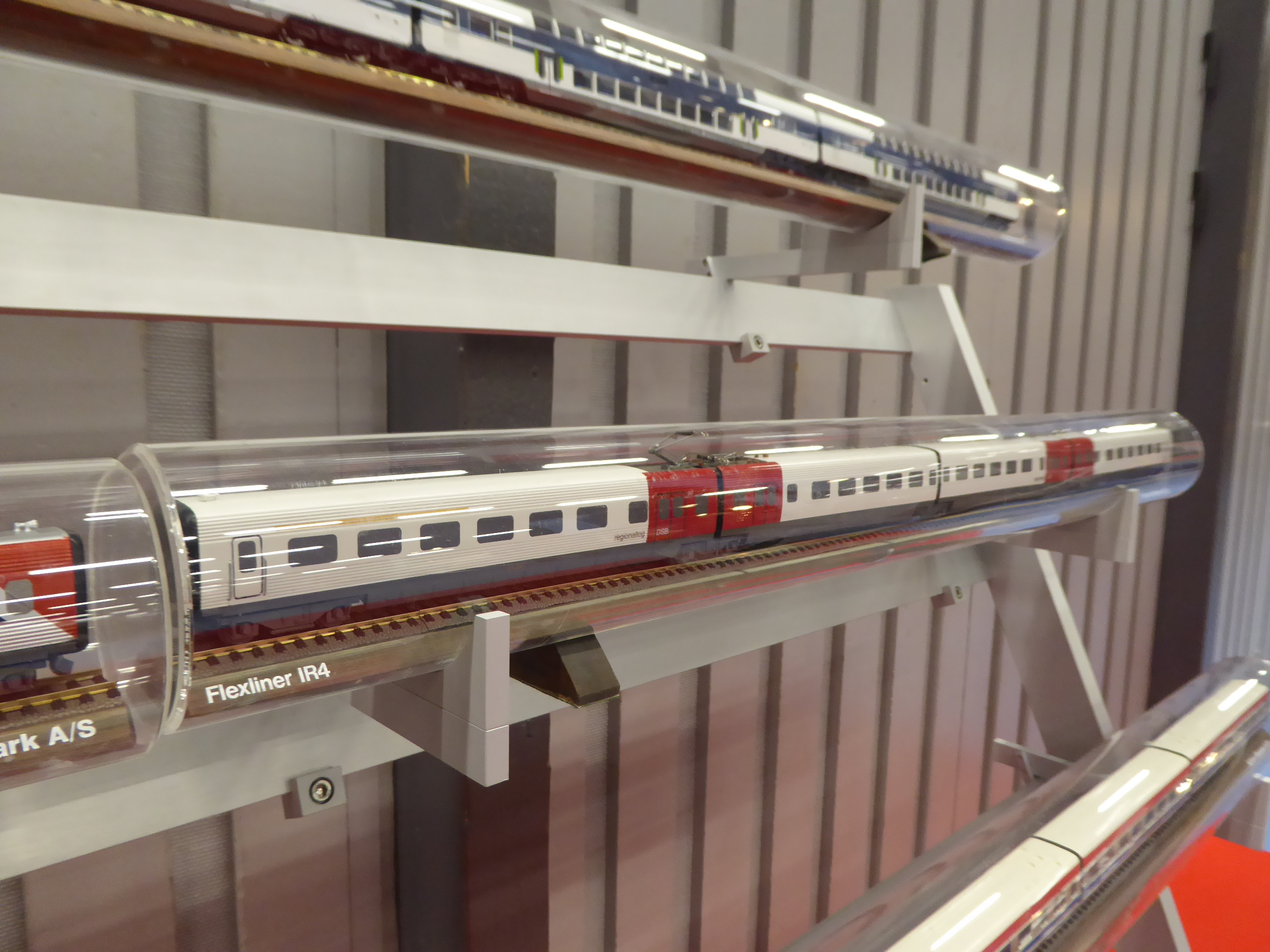
A model of IR4

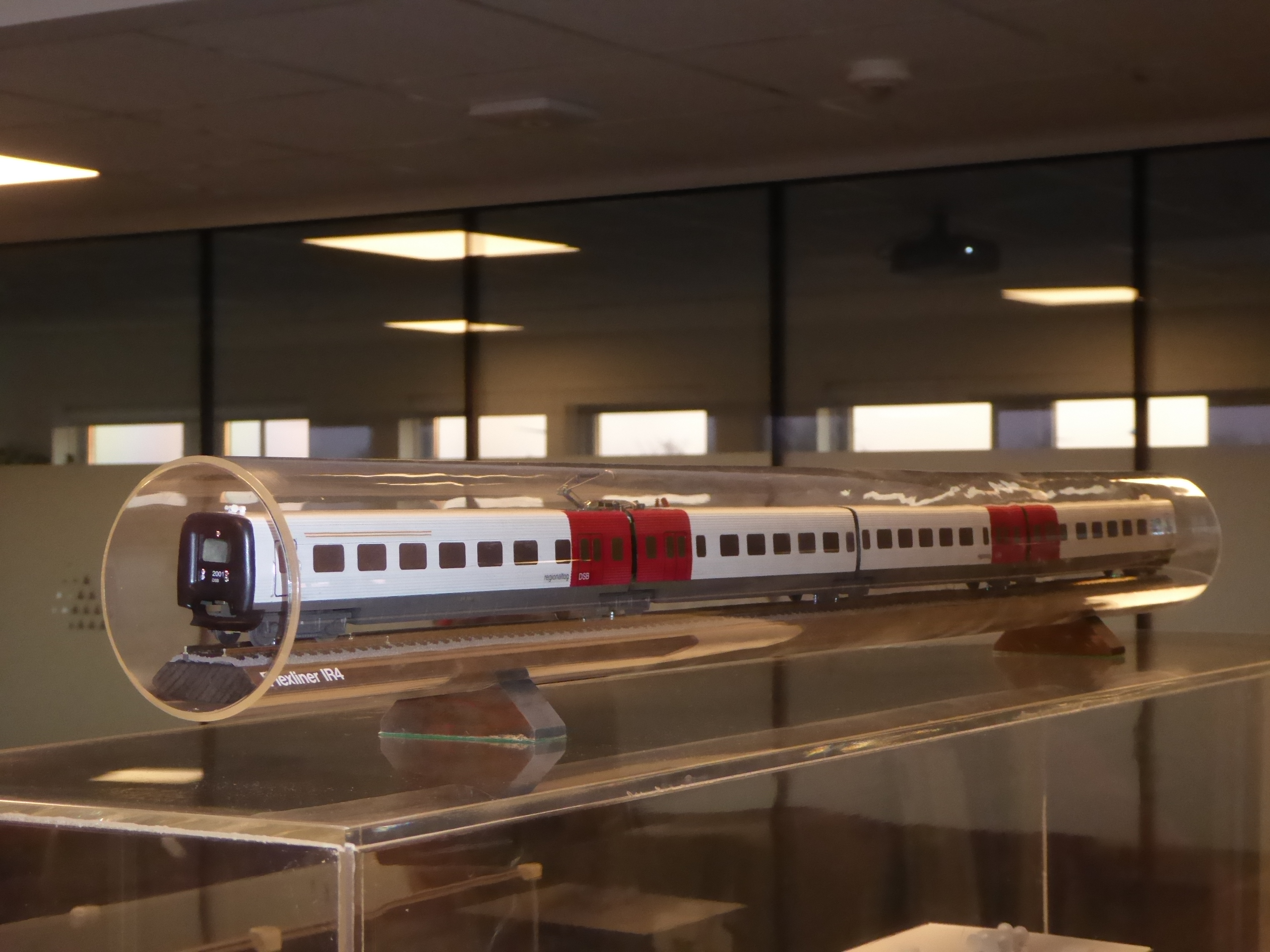
Models of trains from Bombardier - DSB IR4

The first of the IC3's offspring, which is electrically powered. It was originally designed for Danish regional traffic but has later been upgraded and is currently also being used in InterCity traffic, often together with one or more IC3-set(s) on routes which have been electrified. The IR4 consists of 4 carriages (as implied by its name), all of which are similar in design to the MFA/MFB carriages (when viewed from the outside), with a wide set of doors in one end of each carriage. A total of 44 IR4 sets were built, and all sets are still in use. 1 set burned in 2011 but was rebuilt and re-entered service in 2015.

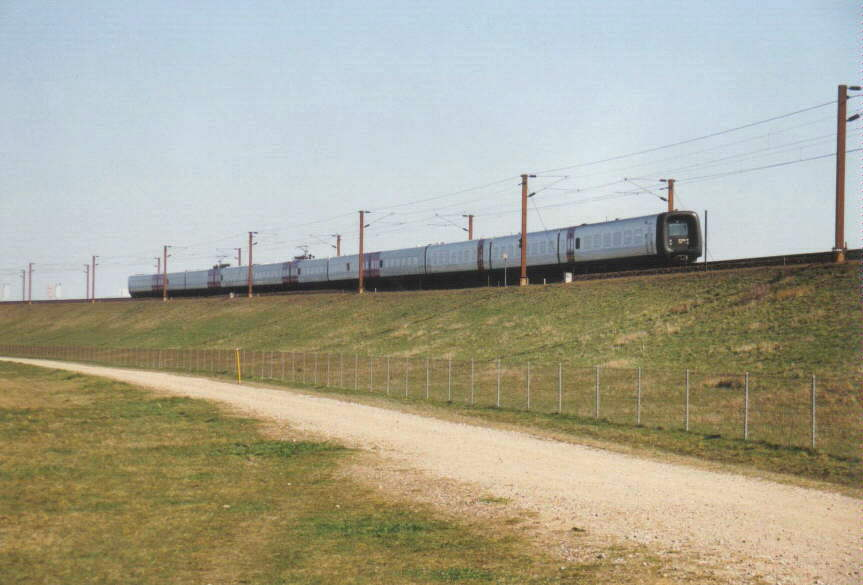
DMU/EMU Intercity train, IC3 and IR4 interconnected at Nyborg

=== IC2 "InterCity 2" ===
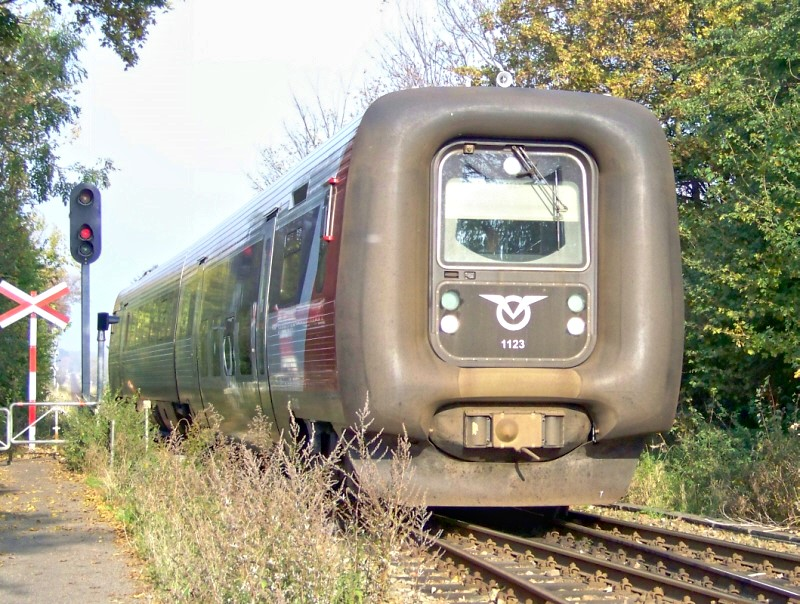
IC2 1123

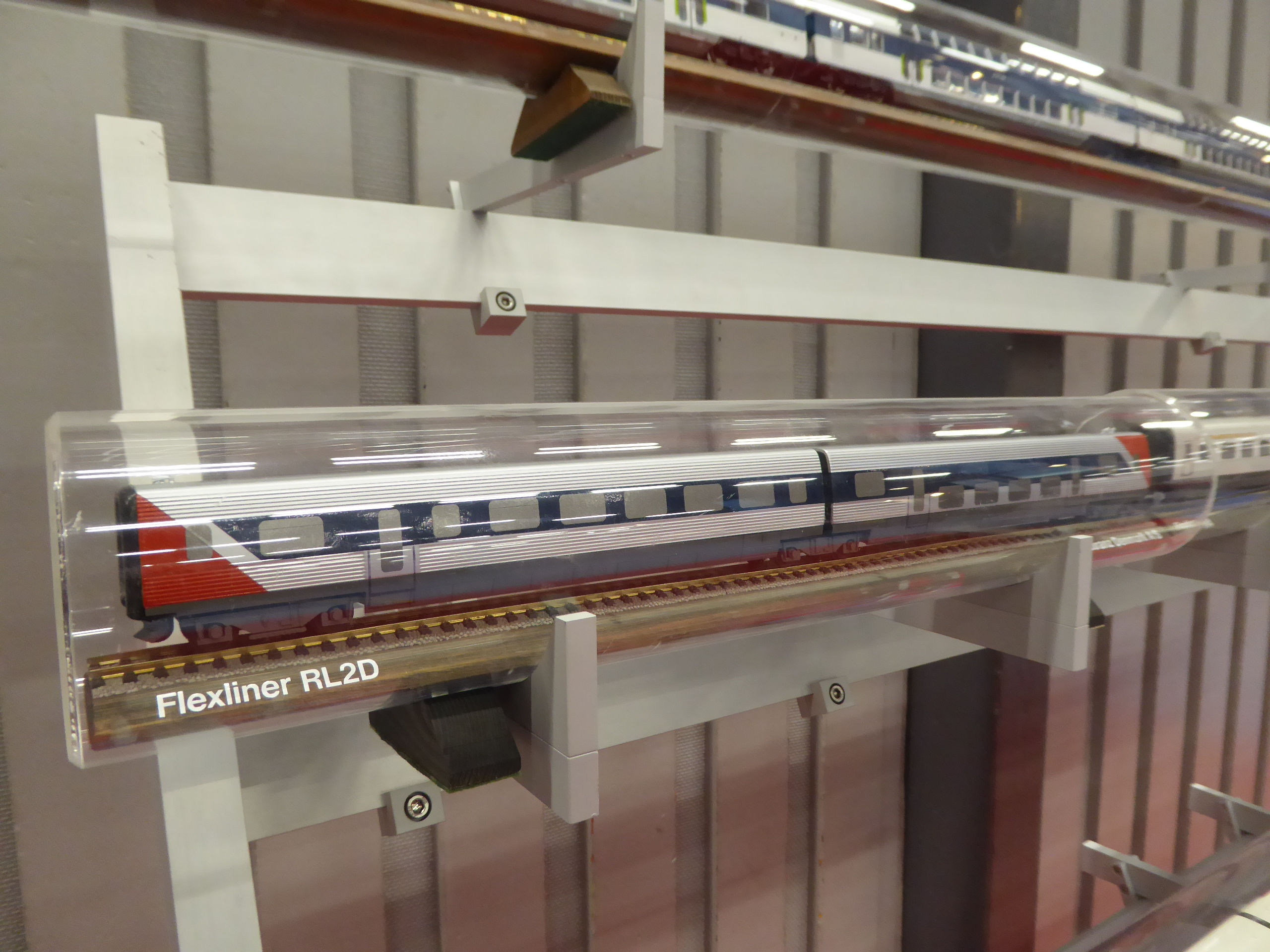
A model of RLD2 IC2

The second of the IC3's offspring is often described as a "discount edition of the IC3". It was designed in 1992–1993, when some private railway operators in Denmark were looking for new trains. It was originally proposed to be an IC3 with the center carriage (the FF) removed, and without engines in one of the remaining carriages. This design did not entirely satisfy representatives of the private railways, so instead, after some debate, it was redesigned to its current appearance.

IC2 is a further development of IC3. It was designed for use on the private lines and on certain local lines, as suggested by the designation "RL2D" which is believed to mean "Regional Local 2 Diesel", with 2 being the number of carriages.

The IC2 consists of 2 carriages, the MF and the FS. The MF is a combined engine and passenger carriage, and has its set of doors placed towards the cab of the carriage, actually as close to the bogies as possible. The MF houses the engines, which are mounted under the floor in the middle of the carriage. It has two engines, delivering a total of 627 kW (840 hp), and drives the train in the same way as the MFA/MFB carriages drive the IC3.

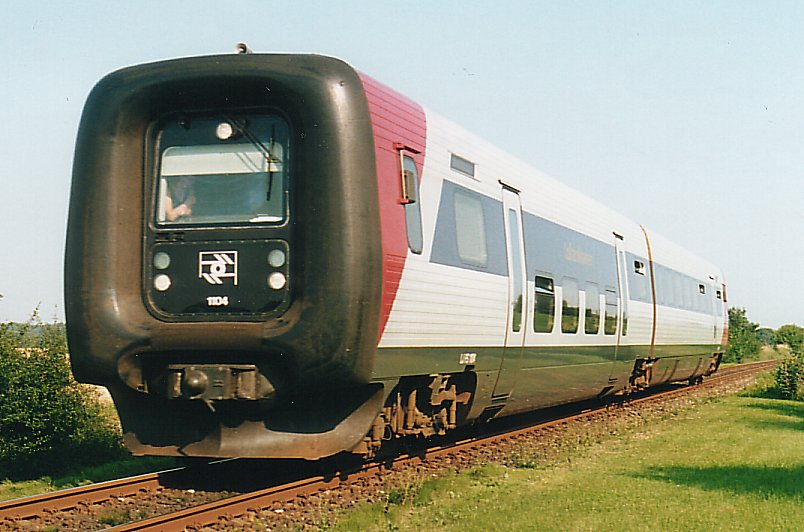
IC2 1104 on Lollandsbanen.

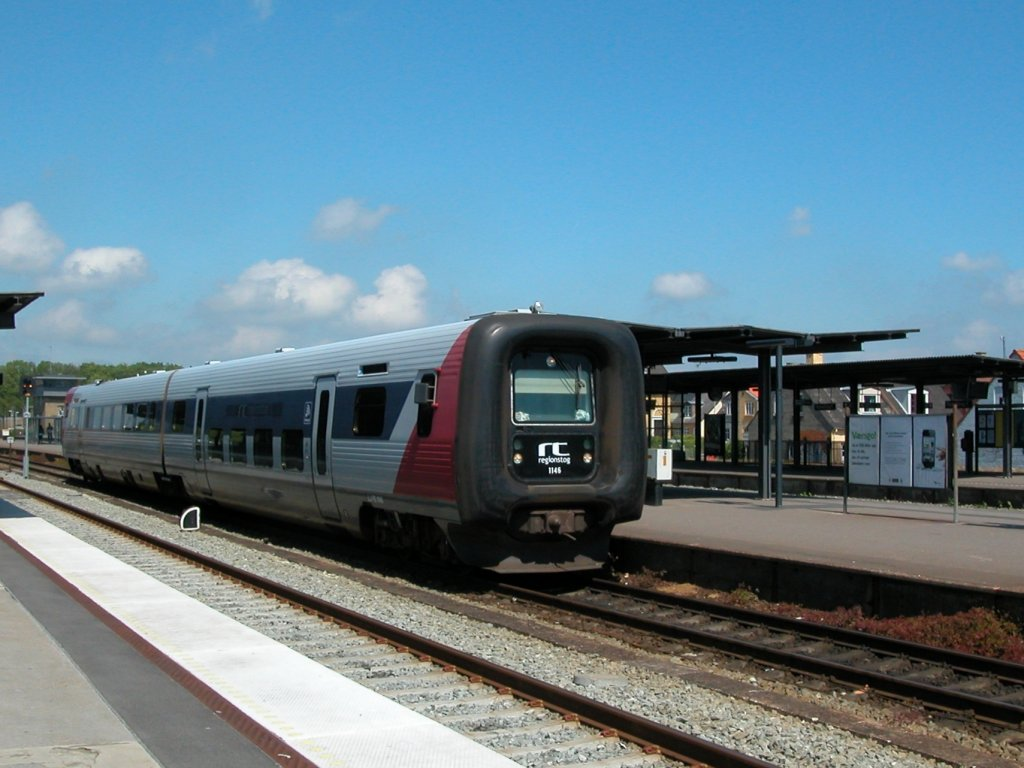
IC2, Regional train, Lollandsbanen

The FS is a combined cab and passenger carriage, and has a quite unique look when viewed from the outside. This is due to the "low-floor entrance" feature included in the design, where part of the floor and doors between the two bogies are "sunken" to a height of 60 cm (23.6 inches) from the top of the rails. This provides very easy access to the train, especially when bicycles, wheelchairs, and the like need to be put on the train. This easy entrance is because the 60 cm (23.6 inches) from the top of the rails is also the general height, within a few centimetres (1–2 in or 2.5–5.1 cm), of platforms on the Danish railway network.

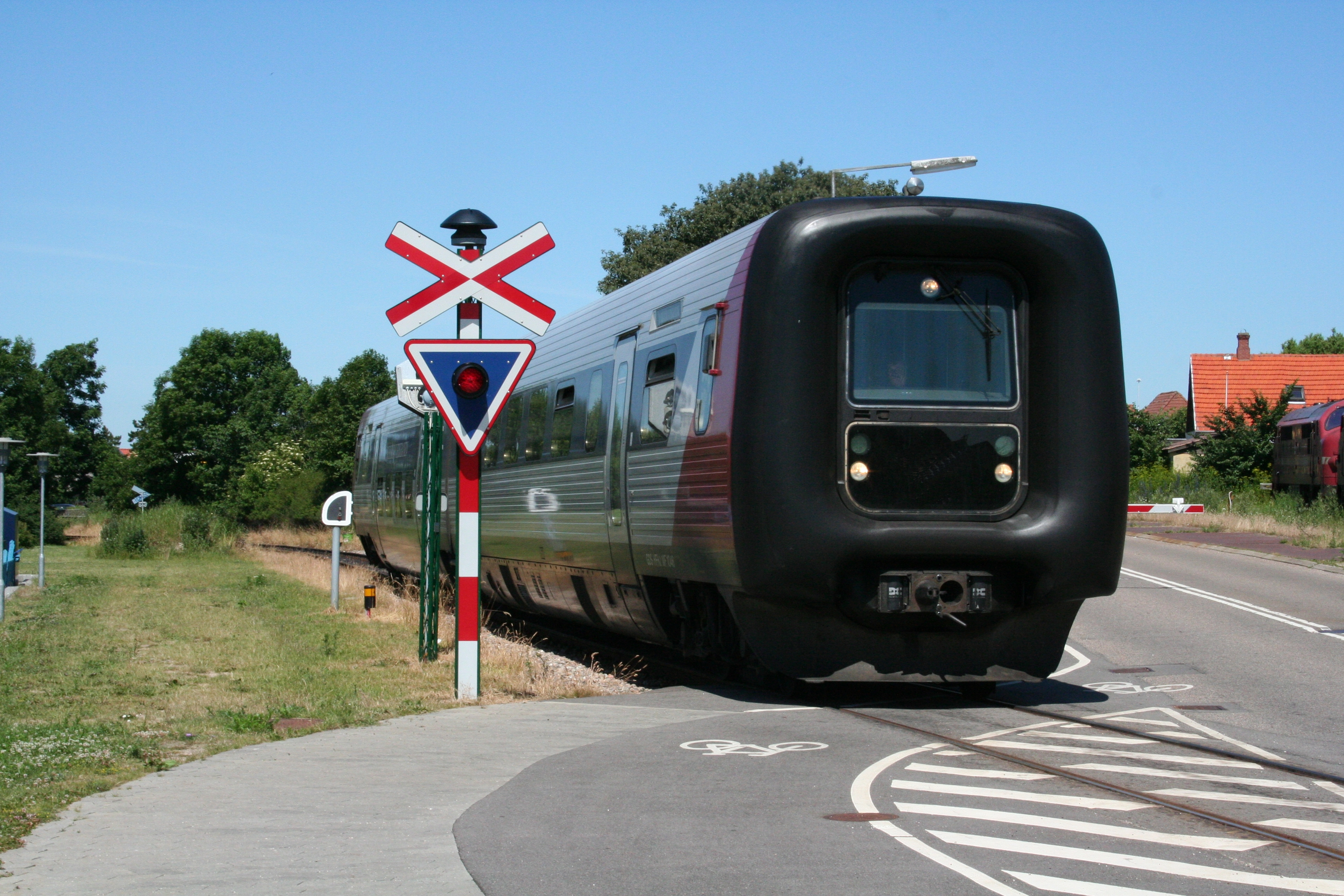
IC2 at Hundested-Hundested Station.

There are some technical differences between the IC2 and the IC3. The most obvious is of course the smaller number of carriages, and other engines (the IC3 has four engines, each delivering approx. 298 kW or 400 hp; the IC2 has two engines, each delivering approx. 313 kW or 420 hp). Other differences include the way the engines are cooled (the IC3 engines are air-cooled, but due to several technical issues with this system, it were decided to use water-cooled engines), electric-driven AC system (another thing decided after experience with the IC3, which AC system were powered directly from the engines).

Although the IC2 shares its physical profile and physical coupling system with the IC3 and the IR4, they are incapable of actually driving as a companion with those two "relatives". This is because the designers of the computer system which transmits the driver's commands to the engines and gearboxes have not been able to come up with a common system for all three train models. Instead, for the different types to work together, a special interface-module is required. This must be built into each trainset (except from the IC3, from which the original command-signal comes). However, due to financial issues, and the fact that it would probably not be used, this module was not included in the trains (although it can easily be added if needed).

A total of thirteen IC2-sets were built, all of which are in service and operated by Lokaltog since 2015.

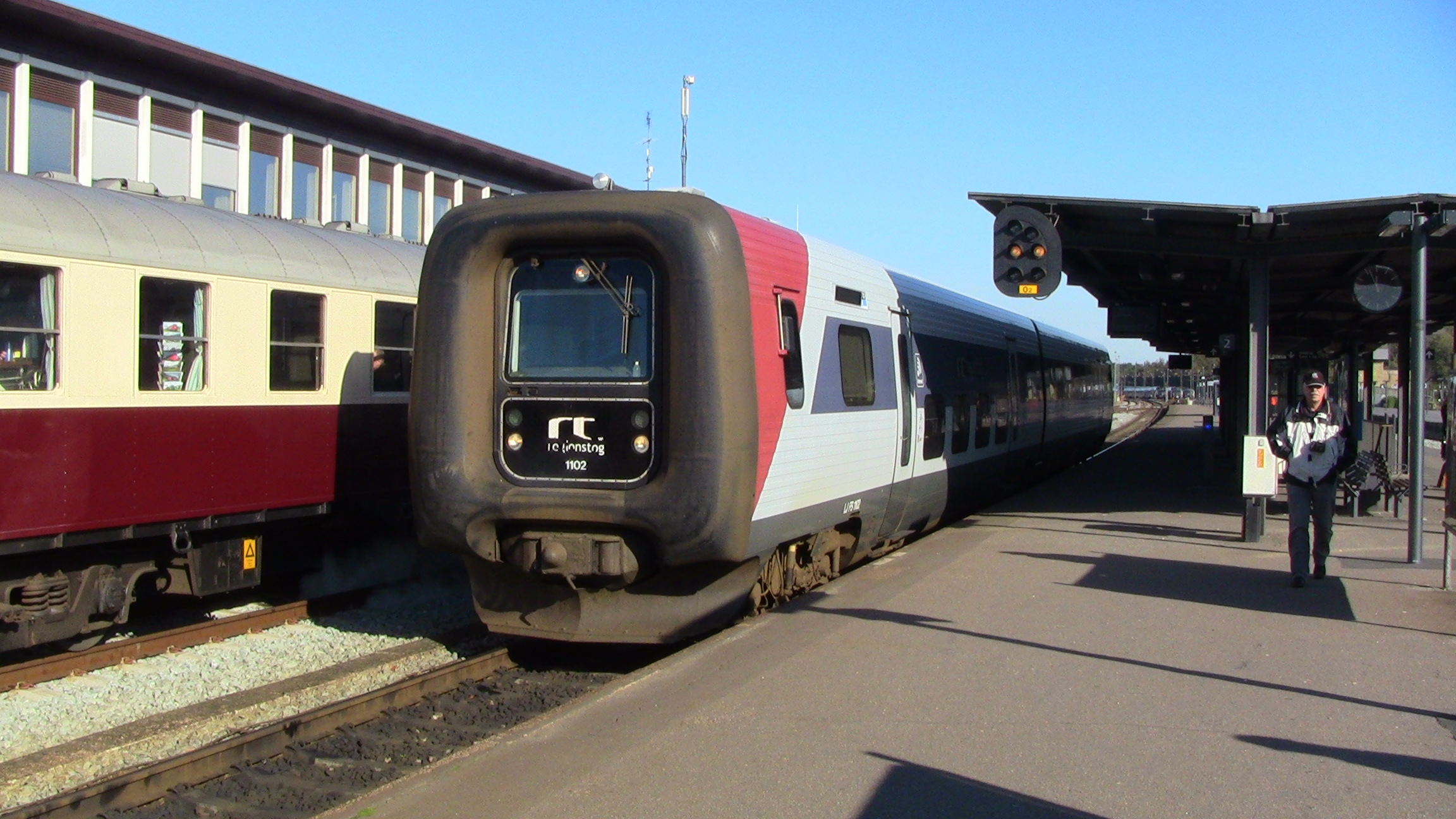
IC2 Regional train

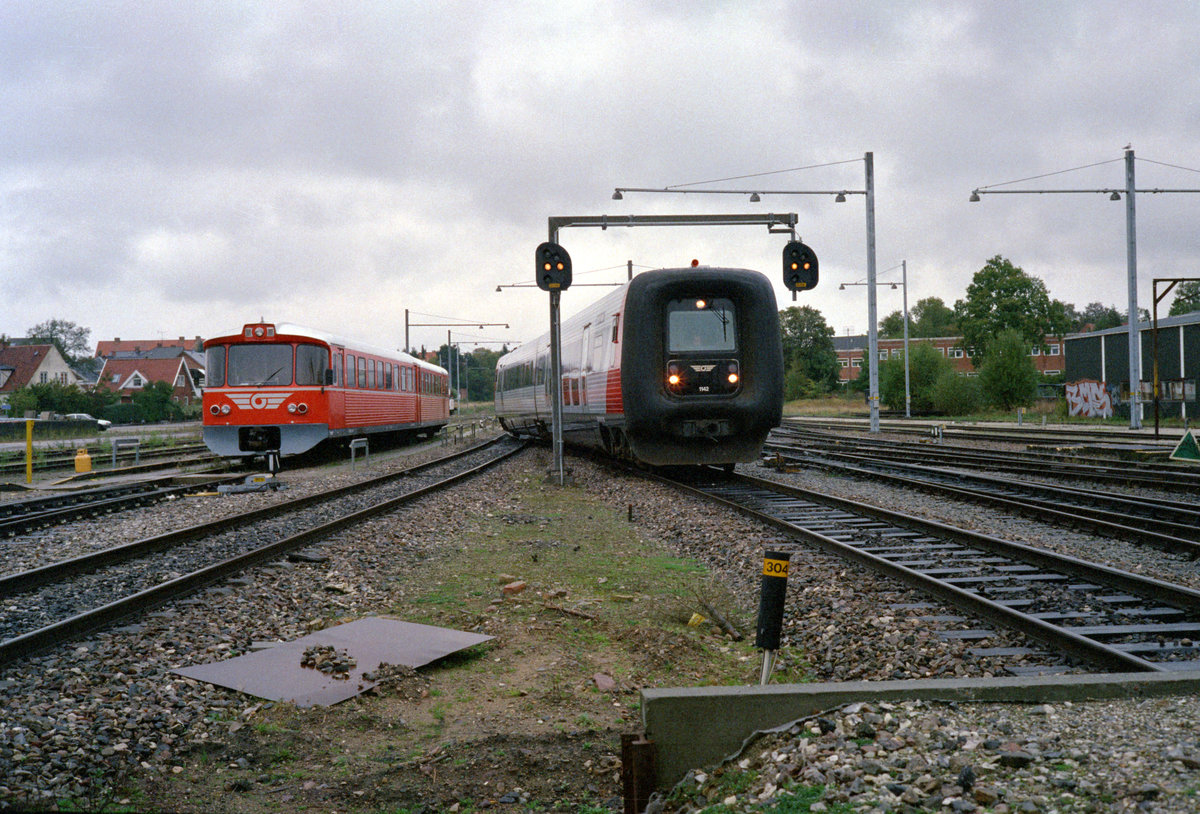
An IC2 train on Gribskovbanen.

=== Øresundtrain ===
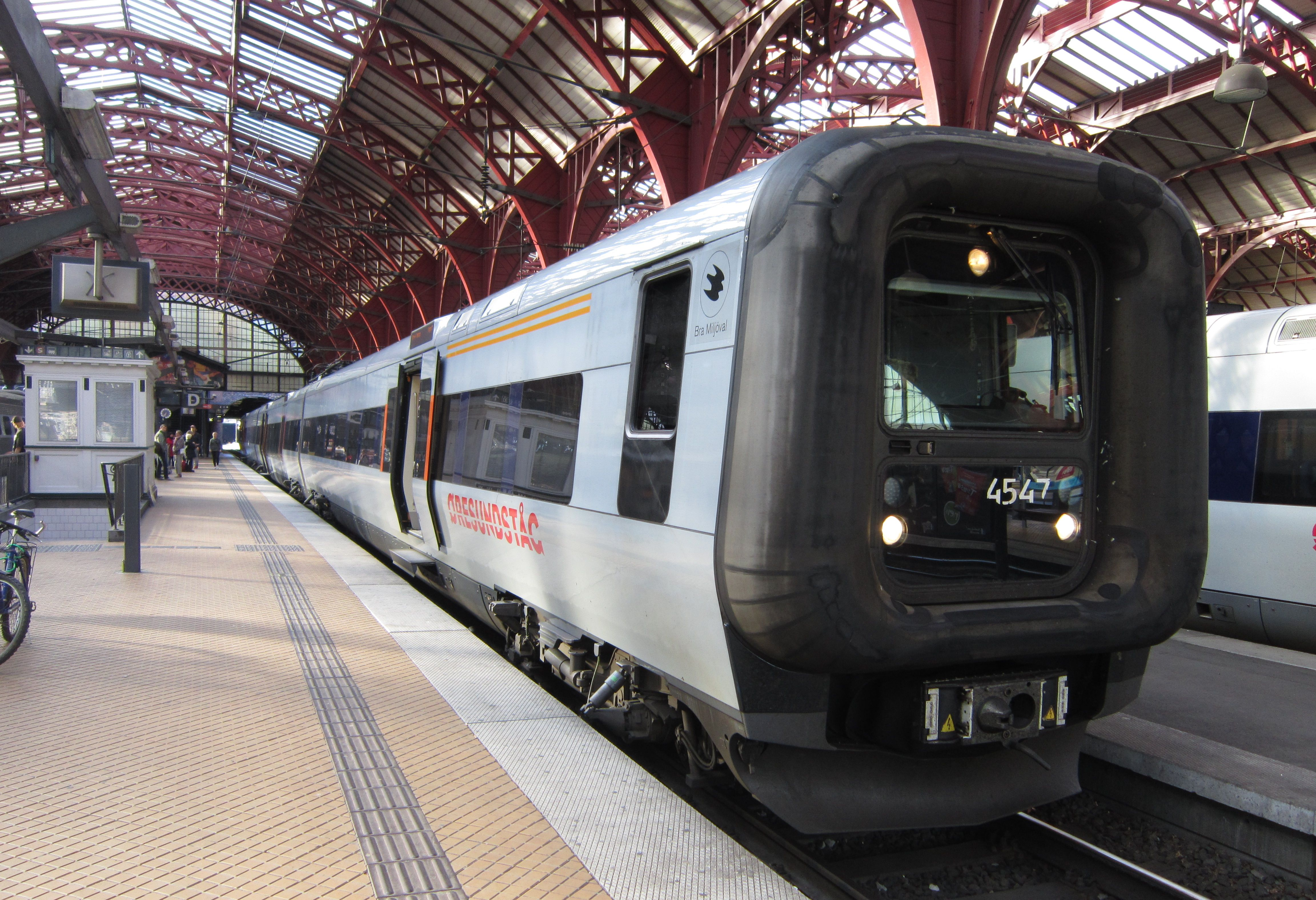
Øresundståg at Copenhagen Central Station

The third and newest of the IC3's offspring is specifically designed for use in the regional traffic in areas surrounding the Øresund Bridge. The train is operated by both DSB and SJ Öresund, with the latter being a sister company to SJ AB. Its formation is ET-FT-ET. The train is electrically powered, and can run on both Danish power (25 kV, 50 Hz) and Swedish power (15 kV, 16 2/3 Hz). It is called Øresundståg Contessa by its manufacturer^{da}, and designated Litra ET in Denmark and X31K in Sweden. Only the front and the cabin are similar to IC3. The wheels, bogies and motors are more similar to Bombardier Regina and each carriage has two bogies. It is used for the regional cross-border traffic called Øresundståg, and the train type is also often called that, these trains are used for some other traffic also.

== Accidents and incidents ==
Fires on the IC3 train sets are not uncommon, with over half of DSB's in service sets having either overheated or suffered from minor burns, however all of these were easy fixes. There have been some incidents where rebuilds were needed.

On 28 December 2010, an IC3 train in Israel caught fire due to a technical failure, injuring 121 people. A soldier shot the windows in order to allow the passengers to escape. The cause of the fire was not an electrical short, as first suspected, but a mechanical problem with the cardan joint, which is located next to the fuel tank in the train.

On 30 December 2010 Israel Railways decided on an immediate stoppage of all the IC3s in the fleet, pending further investigation. The ramifications of this decision were the closure of several lines and stations, including Jerusalem and Dimona and several other suburban lines. Service was resumed on all routes after modifications were approved.

On 20 October 2016, DSB's set number 51 caught fire in Odense, damaging the MFA significantly. No one was hurt, and the set was moved the day after. Then the rebuilding began, with a Swedish set donating its body to the damaged MFA unit. It was fitted with new engines and seats. The set was put rolling again in 2018; most notable is that this set was the first to be painted in DSB's newly formed design replacing the grey with red, and the blue lines at the windows became black. The passenger doors were painted white. Since the set is so far the only set in the new design, many enthusiasts have nicknamed the set “The One and Only”, which slowly has carried over to the personnel as well, although its official name remains “Niels Kjeldsen”.

== See also ==
- IE 22000 Class
- IC4
- IC5
- Prototypelyntog
- RegioSwinger
- SNCB Class AM96
