= Lod–Ganei Aviv railway station =

Railway station in Israel

Lod–Ganei Aviv לוד – גני אביב
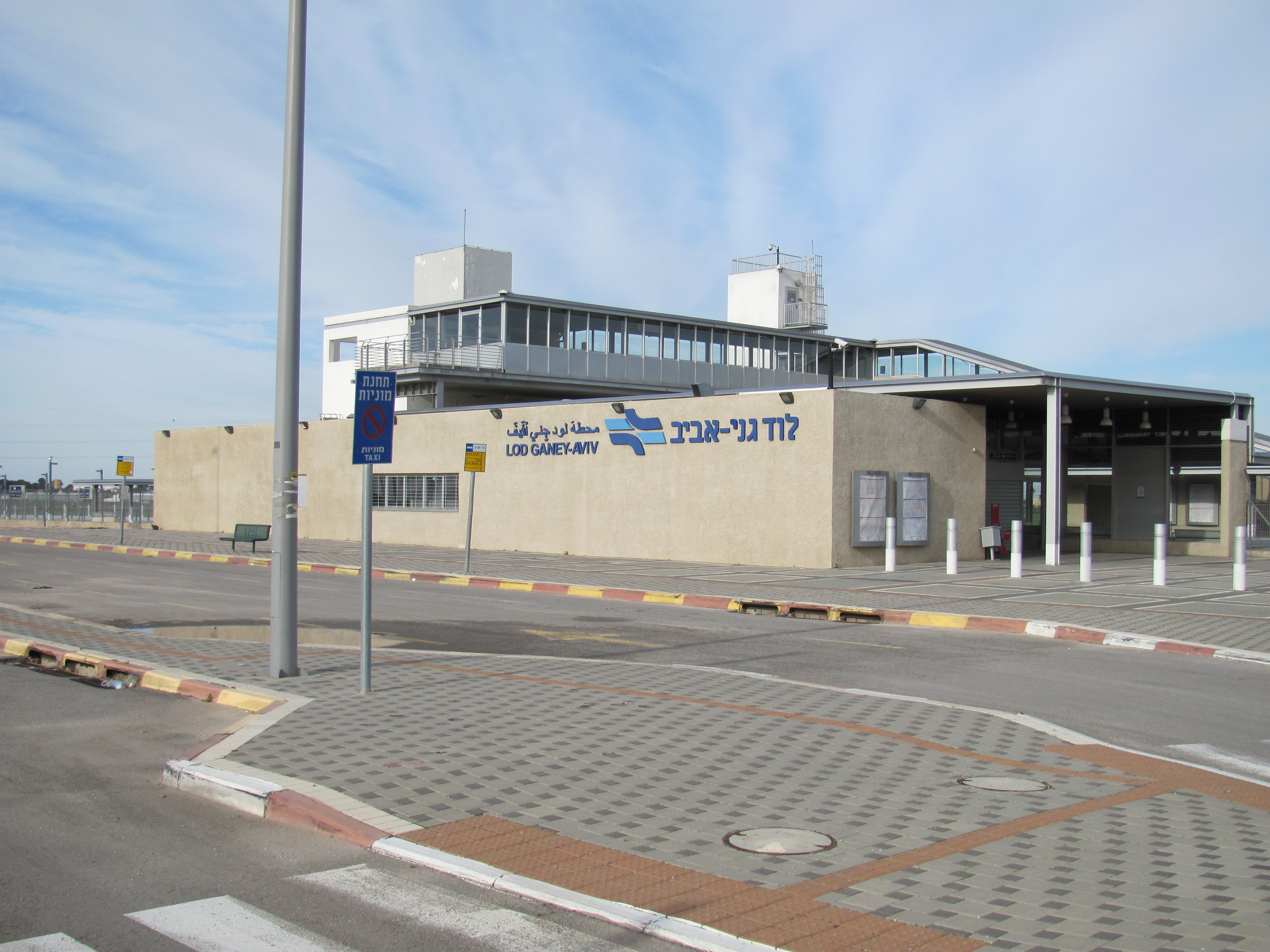

General information
- Coordinates: 31°58′1.03″N 34°52′43.19″E
- Platforms: 2
- Tracks: 2

History
- Opened: 10 May 2008; 18 years ago
- Electrified: 17 September 2022; 3 years ago

Passengers
- 2019: 525,198
- Rank: 50 out of 68
Location

The Lod–Ganei Aviv railway station is a station in Lod, Israel on the Tel Aviv–Rishon LeZion line.

Preceding station	Israel Railways	Following station
Kfar Chabad towards Binyamina	Binyamina–Beersheba	Lod towards Be'er Sheva–Center
Tel Aviv–HaHagana towards Netanya	Netanya–Beit Shemesh	Lod towards Beit Shemesh
