= Biblical Zoo railway station =

Railway station in Jerusalem, Israel

Jerusalem–Biblical Zoo ירושלים – גן החיות התנ״כי
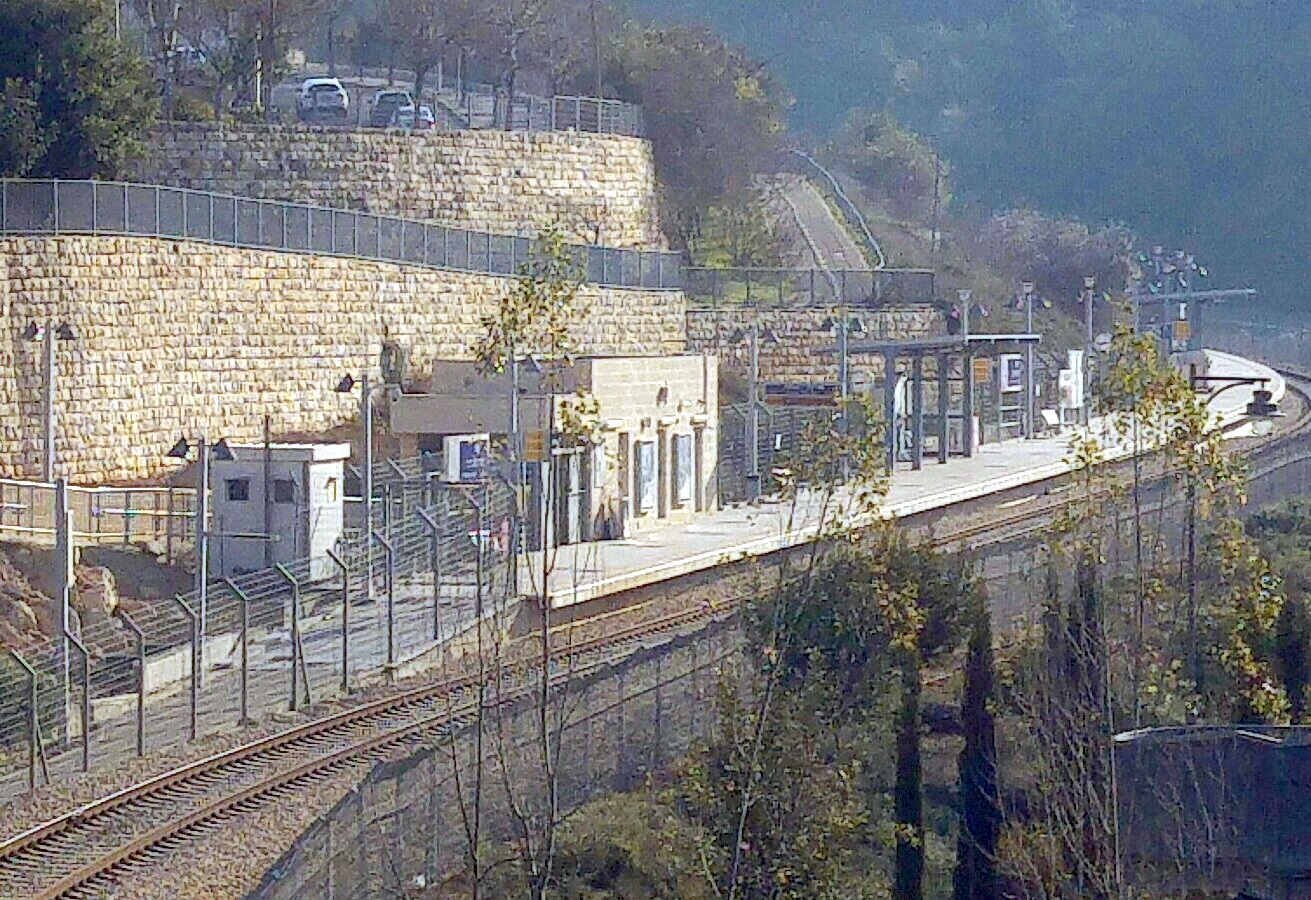

General information
- Coordinates: 31°44′41″N 35°10′37″E
- Platforms: 1
- Tracks: 1

Construction
- Accessible: Yes

History
- Opened: 1996
- Closed: March 2020

Passengers
- 2019: 26,445
- Rank: 67 out of 68

Station sign

Jerusalem–Biblical Zoo railway station is a defunct Israel Railways station on the Jaffa-Jerusalem railway, located in the southwestern part of the city next to the Jerusalem Biblical Zoo. The station saw limited service; with only 26,445 passengers recorded in 2019, it was the country's second least-used station, ahead of only Dimona railway station.

Service to the station has been suspended entirely since March 2020 due to poor usage combined with the economic impacts of the COVID-19 pandemic. Since 2021, the whole rail section between Beit Shemesh railway station and Jerusalem is inoperative until either a replacement is found for the decommissioned IC3 trains, or the line undergoes a massive renovation.
