= Ramla Museum =

Museum in Ramla, Central, Israel

- מוזיאון רמלה
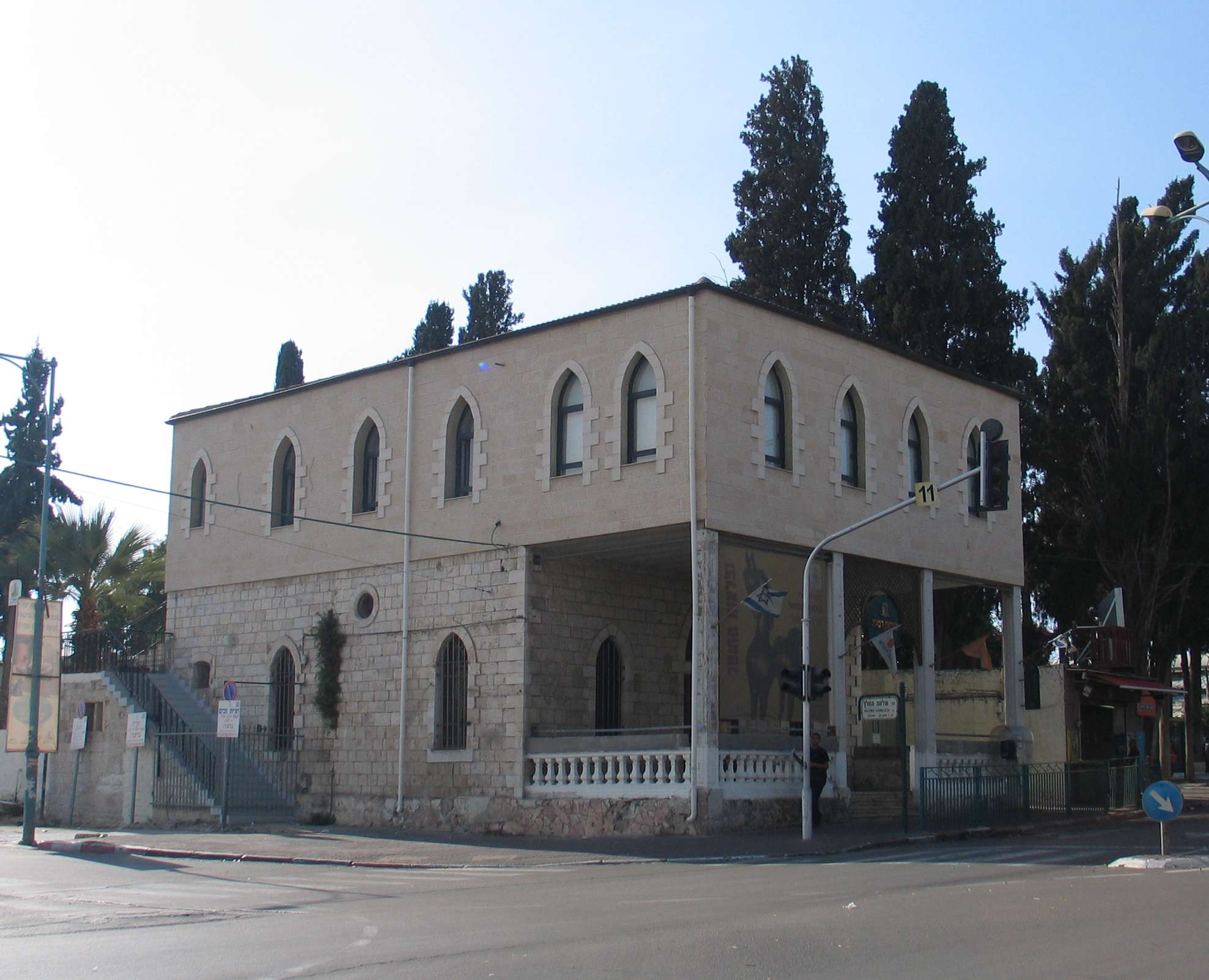
- Established: 2001
- Location: Ramla, Central, Israel
- Coordinates: 31°55′34.6″N 34°52′32.0″E
- Type: museum

The Ramla Museum (Hebrew: מוזיאון רמלה) is a museum in Ramla, Central District, Israel.

== History ==
The museum building was originally constructed in 1922 during the Mandate for Palestine. It was opened as a museum in 2001.

== Exhibitions ==
The museum exhibits the history of Ramla, which is divided into the daily life, commerce, ethnic and arts.

== Transportation ==
The mosque is accessible within walking distance south of Ramla Station of Israel Railways.

== See also ==
- List of Israeli museums
