= Lod railway station =

Railway station in Israel

Lod לוד
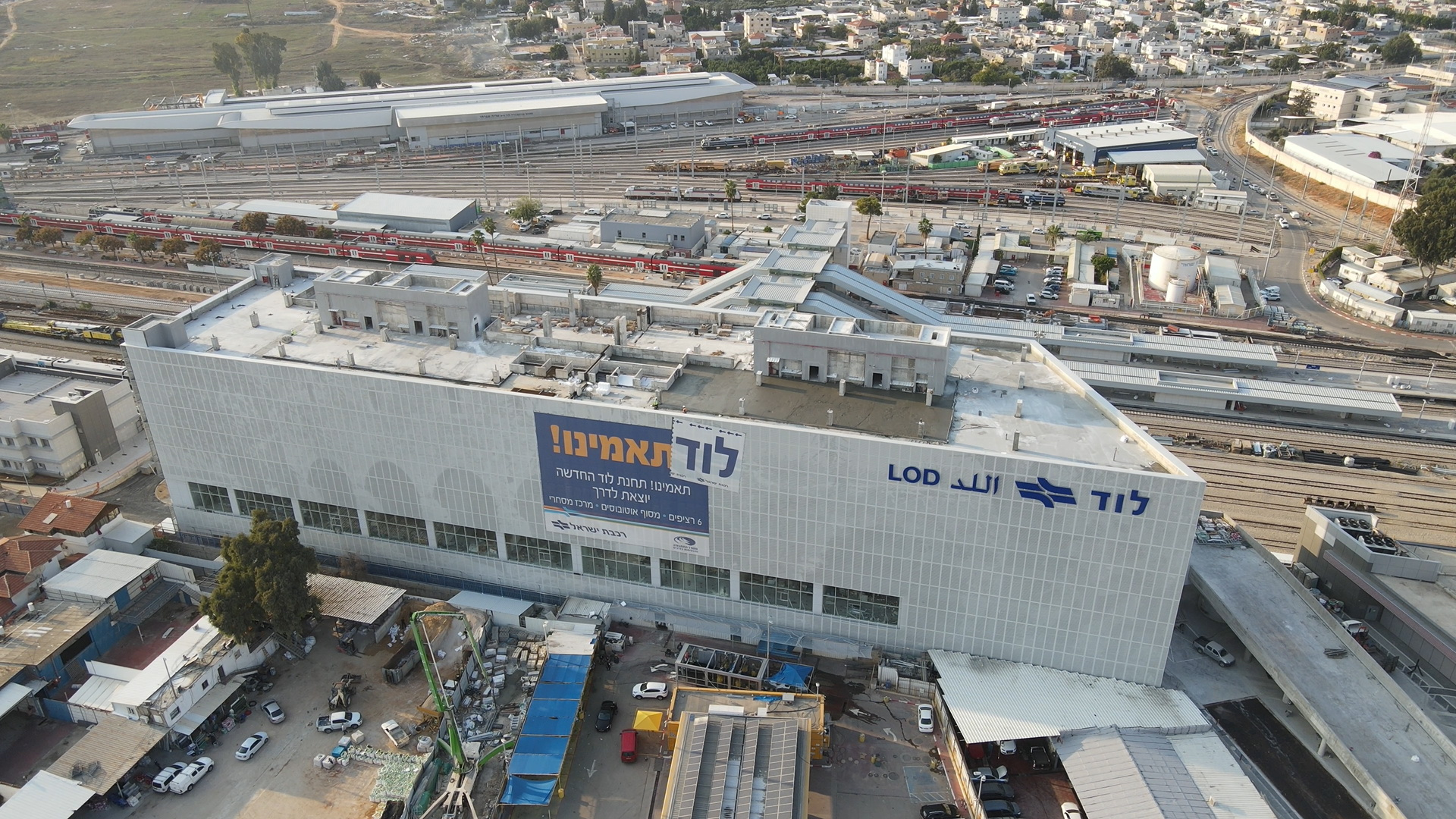

General information
- Location: 5 Yoseftal Ave., Lod
- Coordinates: 31°56′45″N 34°52′32″E
- Platforms: 3
- Tracks: 6

Construction
- Parking: 300 spaces
- Cycle facilities: 5 spaces

History
- Opened: 24 May 1891; 135 years ago
- Rebuilt: 1917–1920; 2016–2020
- Electrified: 17 September 2022; 3 years ago

Passengers
- 2019: 2,489,889
- Rank: 17 out of 68
Location

Lod railway station is an Israel Railways station in Lod, Israel, served by most railway lines of Israel Railways. The station is located in the HaRakevet district of south Lod. In December 2006, Lod Station served a daily average of 7,786 passengers.

Lod station is the 11th most used station of Israel Railways and is home to a major railway depot. It traces its history as such to the 19th century, when it was used as an interim station on the Jaffa-Jerusalem line, the first significant railway line in the Middle East. For many years Lod (then called Lydda) was the main railway hub of mandatory Palestine and later Israel as it sits at the intersection of several major rail lines located in the central part of the country. Also, before the establishment of the state of Israel, the Coastal Railway did not exist, neither did westbound spurs from the Eastern Railway and therefore all traffic from the north of the country bound for Tel Aviv and Jaffa had to first proceed southwards to Lod, then reroute northwest through the station.

The station's location was changed following World War I, when the British rebuilt the Jaffa–Jerusalem line to standard gauge. The original station building serves as a Magen David Adom station. In the late 2010s, the passenger station was rebuilt again, and the new station building, around 500 m northeast from the 1910s-era passenger station, opened on 29 November 2020. The new station complex, around 6000 m^{2} in area, is the third-largest in Israel after Jerusalem–Yitzhak Navon and Modi'in Central. It is located next to the new Israel Railways' headquarters building, which was relocated from the Tel Aviv Savidor Central railway station in 2017. In 2021, the Lod central bus station is expected to be relocated near the new railway station, forming a combined passenger station complex.

The sprawling site also houses a large rail yard and extensive rolling stock maintenance facilities.

In late 2021, Lod station's electronic signage was upgraded to display information in Arabic, in addition to Hebrew and English.

In 2024, the former station building was restored to its British Mandate-era condition, with one exception: a 1968 mural by Leah Majaro-Mintz, which was originally displayed in the Jerusalem-Khan railway station was added to the waiting room.

== Access ==
Bus routes that stop outside the station are: Kavim lines 11, 150, 152, 239 and 461, and Egged line 249.

Preceding station	Israel Railways	Following station
Tel Aviv–HaHagana towards Nahariya	Nahariya–Beersheba	Ramla towards Be'er Sheva–Center
Tel Aviv–HaHagana towards Karmiel	Karmiel–Beersheba	Kiryat Gat towards Be'er Sheva–Center
Lod–Ganei Aviv towards Binyamina	Binyamina–Beersheba	Be'er Ya'akov towards Be'er Sheva–Center
Kfar Chabad towards Netanya	Netanya–Rehovot	Be'er Ya'akov towards Rehovot
Lod–Ganei Aviv towards Netanya	Netanya–Beit Shemesh	Ramla towards Beit Shemesh
