= Mazkeret Batya railway station =

Railway station in Israel

Mazkeret Batya מזכרת בתיה
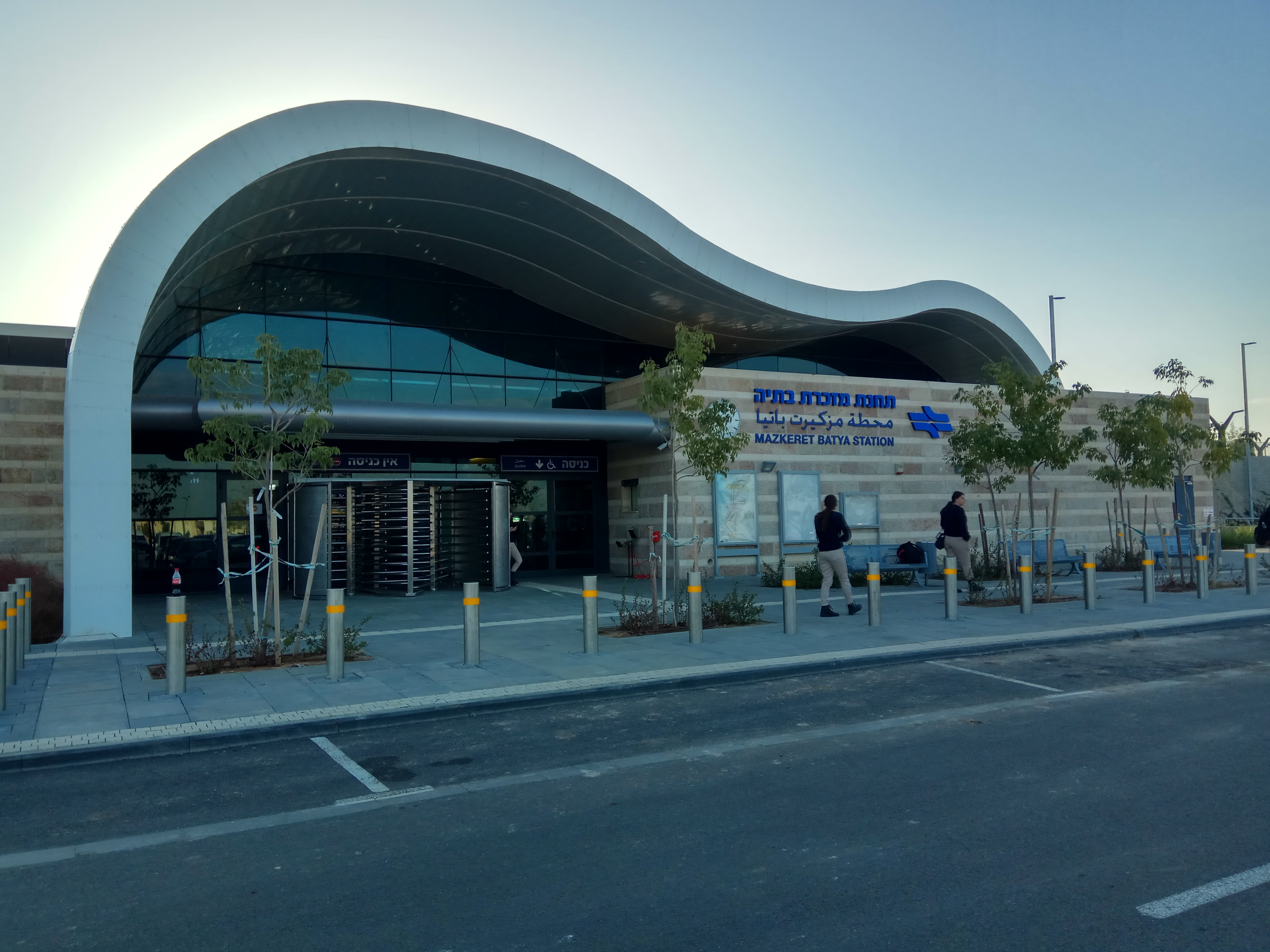

General information
- Coordinates: 31.840129°N 34.854614°E
- Line: Tel Aviv – Lod – Beersheba
- Platforms: 2
- Tracks: 2

Construction
- Accessible: Yes

History
- Opened: 30 May 2019; 7 years ago

Passengers
- 2019: 243,989
- Rank: 64 out of 68
Location

Mazkeret Batya railway station is an Israel Railways passenger station situated on the railway to Beersheba.

== History ==
The station is located north of Route 411 and south of the Shlosha stream, near the planned industrial zone of Mazkeret Batya.

The tender for the station was published in March 2016. On 27 December 2016 the Minister of Transportation, Yisrael Katz laid the cornerstone for the station. According to the ministry of transportation the station was to be inaugurated during October 2018, but this was delayed to 2019. The cost of building the station was approximately 20 million NIS. It opened on 30 May 2019.

The station has 320 parking spaces, 9 handicapped spaces and 7 bus bays. It has two 300 meter long side platforms with an underground passage to reach them, serving a total of two tracks. Each of the side platforms can be converted to an island platform in the future, allowing the station to serve a total of four tracks.

Trains on the Tel Aviv – Lod – Be'er Sheva line stop at this station.

Preceding station	Israel Railways	Following station
Ramla towards Nahariya	Nahariya–Beersheba	Kiryat Mal'akhi–Yoav towards Be'er Sheva–Center

== See also ==
- Transportation in Israel
