= Kiryat Mal'akhi–Yoav railway station =

Railway station in Israel

Kiryat Mal'akhi–Yoav קריית מלאכי – יואב
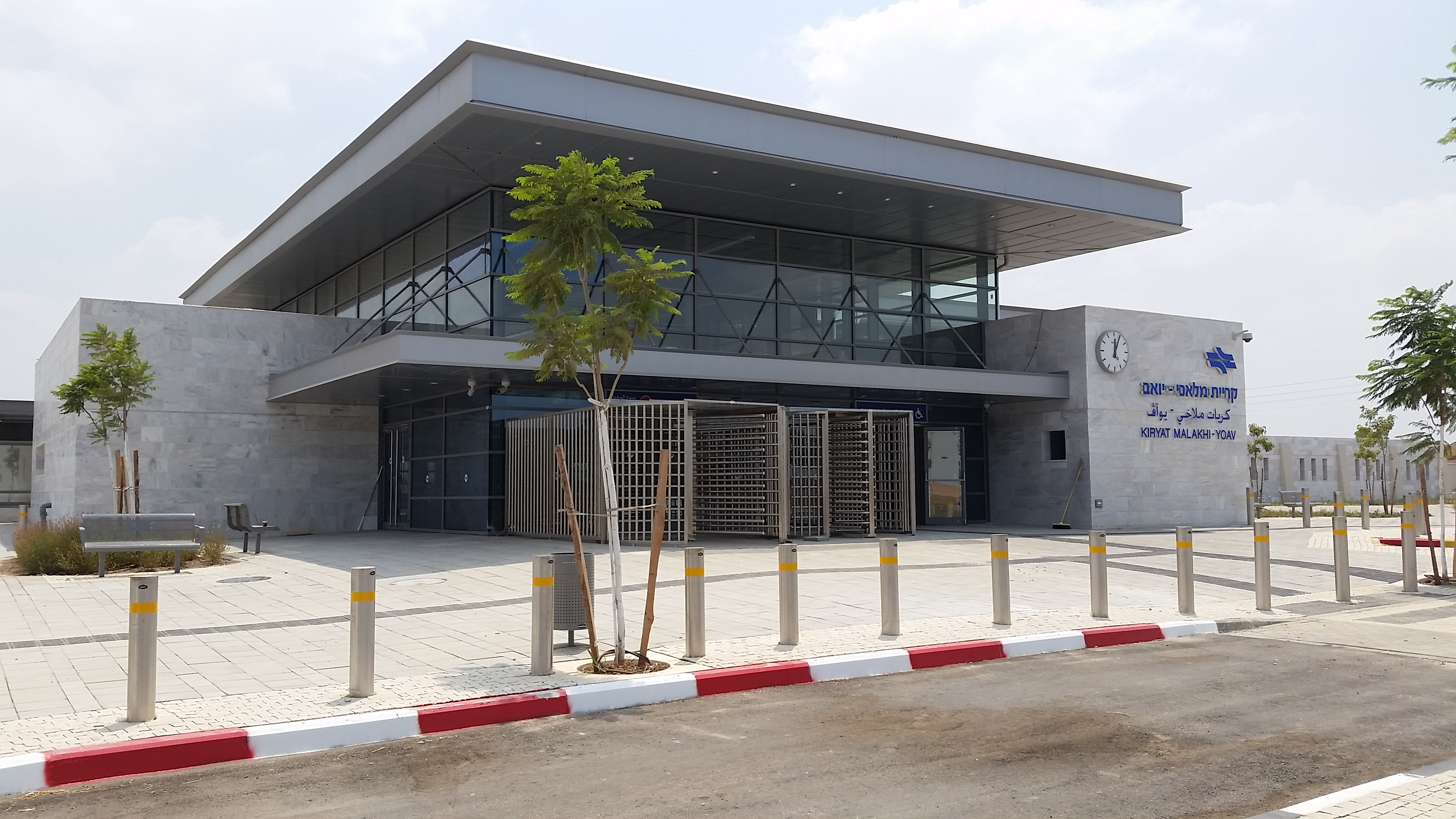
- Station Entrance

General information
- Coordinates: 31.747°N 34.822°E
- Line: Tel Aviv - Beersheba
- Platforms: 2
- Tracks: 2

Construction
- Accessible: yes

History
- Opened: 18 September, 2018

Passengers
- 2019: 360,569
- Rank: 58 out of 68
Location

Kiryat Mal'akhi–Yoav railway station (Hebrew: תחנת רכבת קריית מלאכי – יואב) is a railway station in southern Israel, next to Kfar Menahem and Highway 6. It is named after the closest city, Kiryat Mal'akhi, and the adjoining Yoav Regional Council. It opened in late 2018.

The station was envisioned as part of the renovation works for the railway to Beersheba, but a budget had not been allocated, so only the station's platforms were originally built.

In 2016, a tender was published for the construction of the station. In 2017, the proposed name was changed from Kfar Menahem to Kiryat Mal'akhi – Yoav, despite it being located 14 km (8.7 mi) from the city.

Preceding station	Israel Railways	Following station
Mazkeret Batya towards Nahariya	Nahariya–Beersheba	Kiryat Gat towards Be'er Sheva–Center
