= Lehavim–Rahat railway station =

Railway station in Israel

Lehavim–Rahat להבים – רהט
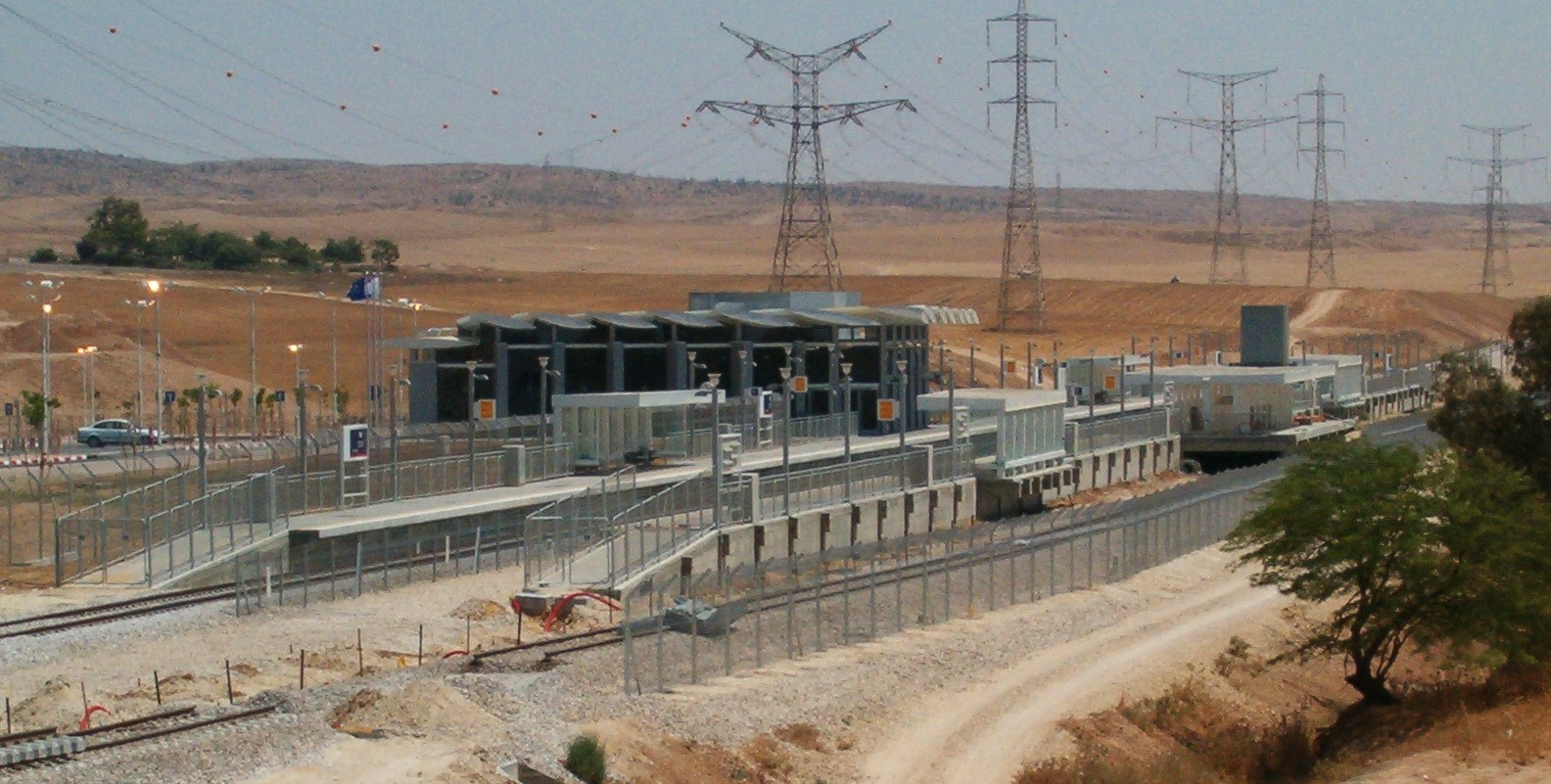

General information
- Coordinates: 31.3698°N 34.7981°E

History
- Opened: 24 June 2007; 19 years ago

Passengers
- 2019: 438,867
- Rank: 54 out of 68
Location

Station layout: Platform 1 – Red; Platform 2 – Black

The Lehavim–Rahat railway station is a station on the Israel Railways lines between Tel Aviv (and points north) and Beersheba, located near Lehavim Junction. The station was opened on June 23, 2007. It serves the city of Lehavim and the Bedouin city of Rahat.

The station was briefly renamed to Lehavim Railway Station, or Lehavim Center Railway Station, although Rahat was added back to the name after a campaign led by Rahat's mayor, Talal al-Karnawi.

== History ==
The station was designed by architect Eli Armon.

== Station lines ==
Preceding station	Israel Railways	Following station
Kiryat Gat towards Nahariya	Nahariya–Beersheba	Be'er Sheva–North towards Be'er Sheva–Center
