= Kiryat Gat railway station =

Railway station in Israel

Kiryat Gat קריית גת
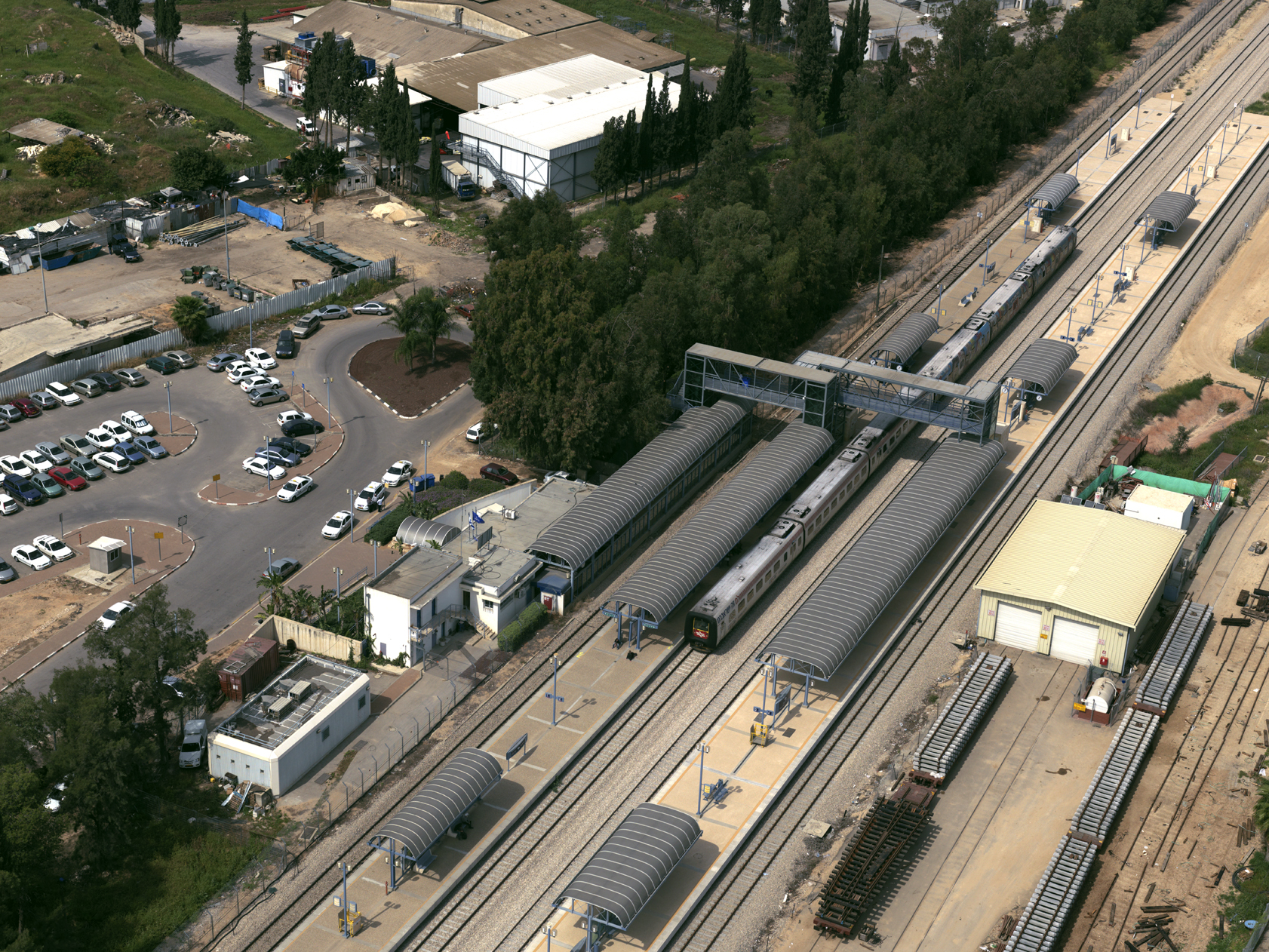

General information
- Coordinates: 31°36′12″N 34°46′40″E
- Line: Tel Aviv - Beersheba
- Platforms: 2
- Tracks: 4

Construction
- Parking: 100

History
- Opened: July 1960
- Closed: 1979 to 1997
- Rebuilt: 1997

Passengers
- 2019: 1,175,058
- Rank: 35 out of 68
Location

The Kiryat Gat railway station (Hebrew: תחנת הרכבת קריית גת; Arabic: كريات جات) is an Israel Railways station in Kiryat Gat, situated on the Railway to Beersheba. It is located in the industrial zone in the east of Kiryat Gat. The station was first opened in July 1960, but was closed from 1979 to 1997.

The station is accessible by intracity bus routes 1, 2, 3, 4 (and their variants 11, 12, 13, 14) and regional bus routes 61, 62, 63, 64, 65, 66, 68, 69, 70 and 251. All routes are operated by Dan BaDarom.

== Train service ==
The station is open 24 hours a day, except on Saturdays. At peak times there are two trains per hour in each direction to and from Tel Aviv (and points north) and Be're Sheva, with a journey time of approximately half an hour to each city. Service then drops to one train per hour at off-peak times. Early morning trains to and from the station also stop at Ben Gurion International Airport.

== Station Lines ==
| Preceding station | Israel Railways | Following station |
|---|---|---|
| Kiryat Mal'akhi–Yoav towards Nahariya | Nahariya–Beersheba | Lehavim–Rahat towards Be'er Sheva–Center |
| Lod towards Karmiel | Karmiel–Beersheba | Be'er Sheva–North towards Be'er Sheva–Center |
