= Migdal HaEmek–Kfar Baruch railway station =

Railway station in Israel

Coordinates: 32.6475°N 35.2096°E

Migdal HaEmek–Kfar Baruch מגדל העמק – כפר ברוך
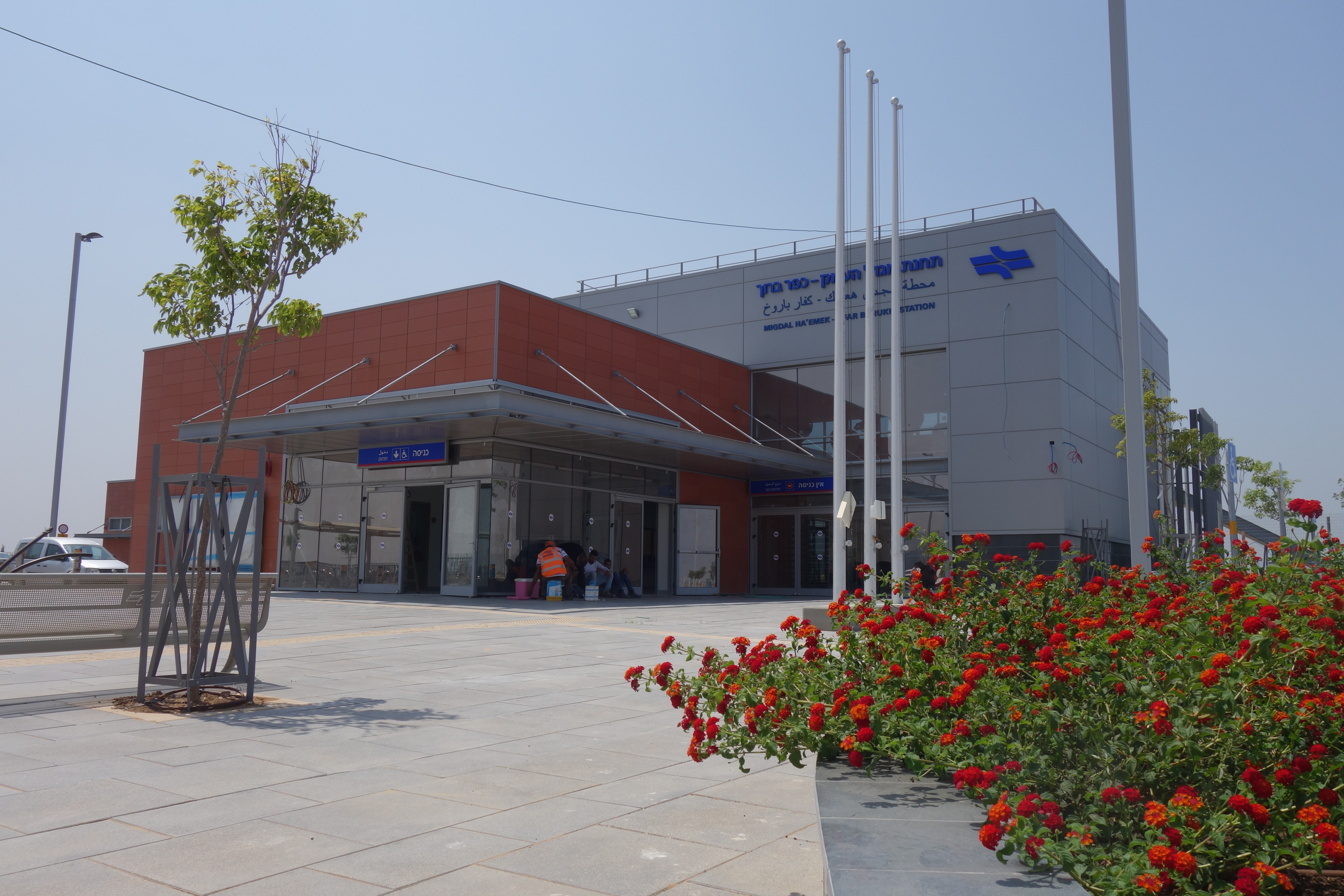
- Entrance to station

General information
- Location: Israel
- Owner: Israel Railways
- Platforms: 1
- Tracks: 2

Construction
- Parking: 469 free spaces

History
- Opened: August 29, 2016

Passengers
- 2019: 259,977
- Rank: 63 out of 68
Location

Migdal HaEmek–Kfar Baruch railway station (Hebrew: תחנת הרכבת מגדל העמק – כפר ברוך) is an Israel Railways passenger station situated on the Jezreel Valley railway. It is served by one to two trains per hour in each direction.

With 259,977 passengers recorded in 2019, it was the least-used station in the North District.

There was a historic train station built in 1926 for the residents of the moshav Kfar Baruch, to the north of the village. It was a simple shack for awaiting passengers and had neither a ticket booth, nor tickets printed for the station. Therefore, the residents had to haggle with the train conductor on the train in hopes of being let in. Today, there are no remnants left of the station. It was approximately 1 km north-east of the new station location.

== Public transport connections ==
There are 8 bus routes that terminate at the station, all of which are operated by Superbus except route 111.

- Route 5: From Migdal HaEmek CBS to the station.
- Route 6: From Migdal HaEmek CBS to the station via neighbourhoods.
- Route 9: From Migdal HaEmek Industrial Area to the station via neighbourhoods.
- Route 19: From Migdal HaEmek Industrial Area to the station via neighbourhoods and Kfar Baruch.
- Route 25: Kfar HaHoresh to the station via Migdal HaEmek.
- Route 105: From Ramat David direct to the station
- Route 111: From Nazareth and Yafia to the station.
- Route 305: From Ramat David to the station via Gvat, Yifat and Sarid.

Preceding station	Israel Railways	Following station
Afula towards Beit She'an	Beit She'an–Atlit	Yokneam–Kfar Yehoshua towards Atlit
