= Afula railway station =

Israel Railways passenger station in Afula

Afula עפולה
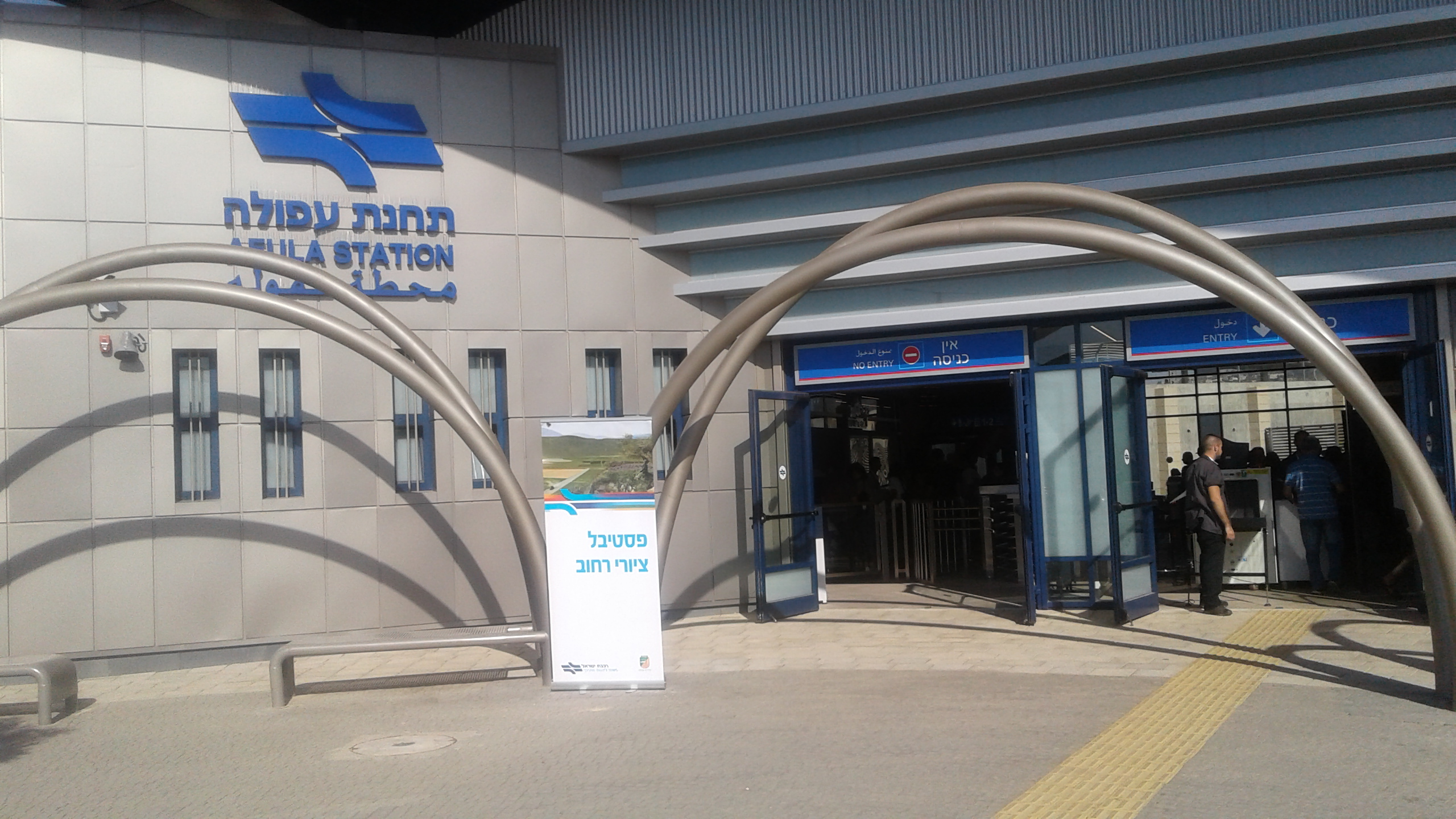

General information
- Coordinates: 32°37′18″N 35°17′43″E
- Platforms: 1
- Tracks: 2

Construction
- Parking: 690 free spaces
- Accessible: yes

History
- Opened: 2016

Passengers
- 2019: 776,477
- Rank: 47 out of 68
Location

The Afula railway station (Hebrew: תחנת הרכבת עפולה, Taḥanat HaRakevet Afula) is a railway station on the Beit She'an – Atlit line, serving Afula, Israel, and the surrounding communities. It opened in 2016.

== Public transport connections ==
There are several bus routes that stop at the station. All of them are operated by Superbus.

Near the station's entrance there is a bus terminal. Ten bus routes departing and terminating at the terminal except two one-way rush hour bus routes that only end at the terminal.

- Routes 15/16: Circular bus routes that serve the main part of the city.
- Route 49: from Yael via Meitav, Prazon and Avital to the station.
- Route 50: from Ram On via Dvora, Adirim, Barak and Hever to the station.
- Route 51: from Gadish via Ml'ea, Nir Yafeh and Omen to the station.
- Route 52: from Muqeible via Sandala and Gan Ner to the station.
- Route 57: from Gidona via Geva and Kfar Yehezkel to the station.
- Route 110: from Afula Illit neighbourhood to the station.
- Routes 115/116: One way rush hour bus routes to the station.
- Route 123: from Givat HaMoreh neighbourhood to the station.
- Route 147: from Iksal the station via Kfar Gidon.

In addition to these bus routes, there are also a few bus routes at Yoash Dovnov street like 19, 44, 46, 350, 355.

== Historical station ==
Afule
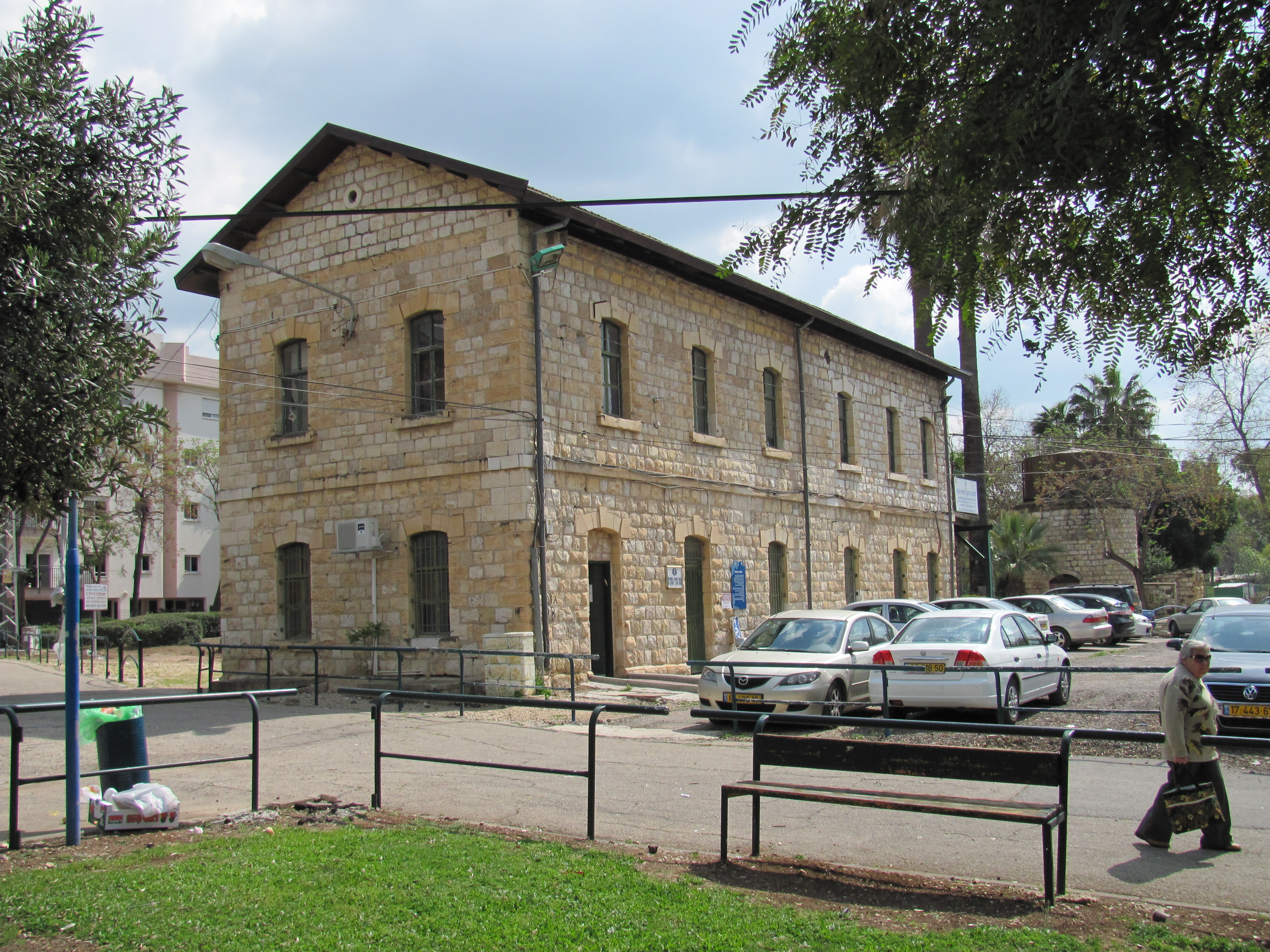

General information
- Location: HaBanim Garden, Zalman Hoz St 1, Afula
- Coordinates: 32°36′38″N 35°17′24″E
- Owner: Palestine Railways
- Line: Jezreel Valley railway

History
- Opened: 1905
- Closed: 2 March 1948
Location

Afula (Afule during Ottoman period) used to be the fourth station on the Ottoman era Jezreel Valley railway. It was named after the Arab village there, al-Fuleh, until the Jewish town Afula was founded there in 1925. The station was an important crossroads and served as a terminus for the Afula–Nablus extension of the valley line, which started operations to Jenin in 1913.

The station prompted the quick growth of al-Fuleh/Afula, and various civilian and military installation were built in its vicinity, including a regional post office that served the entire Jezreel Valley built in 1922.

On November 1, 1945, the station was destroyed as part of the Night of the Trains by the Jewish Resistance Movement, and has not been used since. A museum was built on the grounds of the station, commemorating the history of the Jezreel Valley railway. The historic station is approximately 1.5 km south of the modern station's location.

Preceding station	Israel Railways	Following station
Beit She'an Terminus	Beit She'an–Atlit	Migdal HaEmek–Kfar Baruch towards Atlit
