= Ramla railway station =

Railway station in Israel

Ramla רמלה
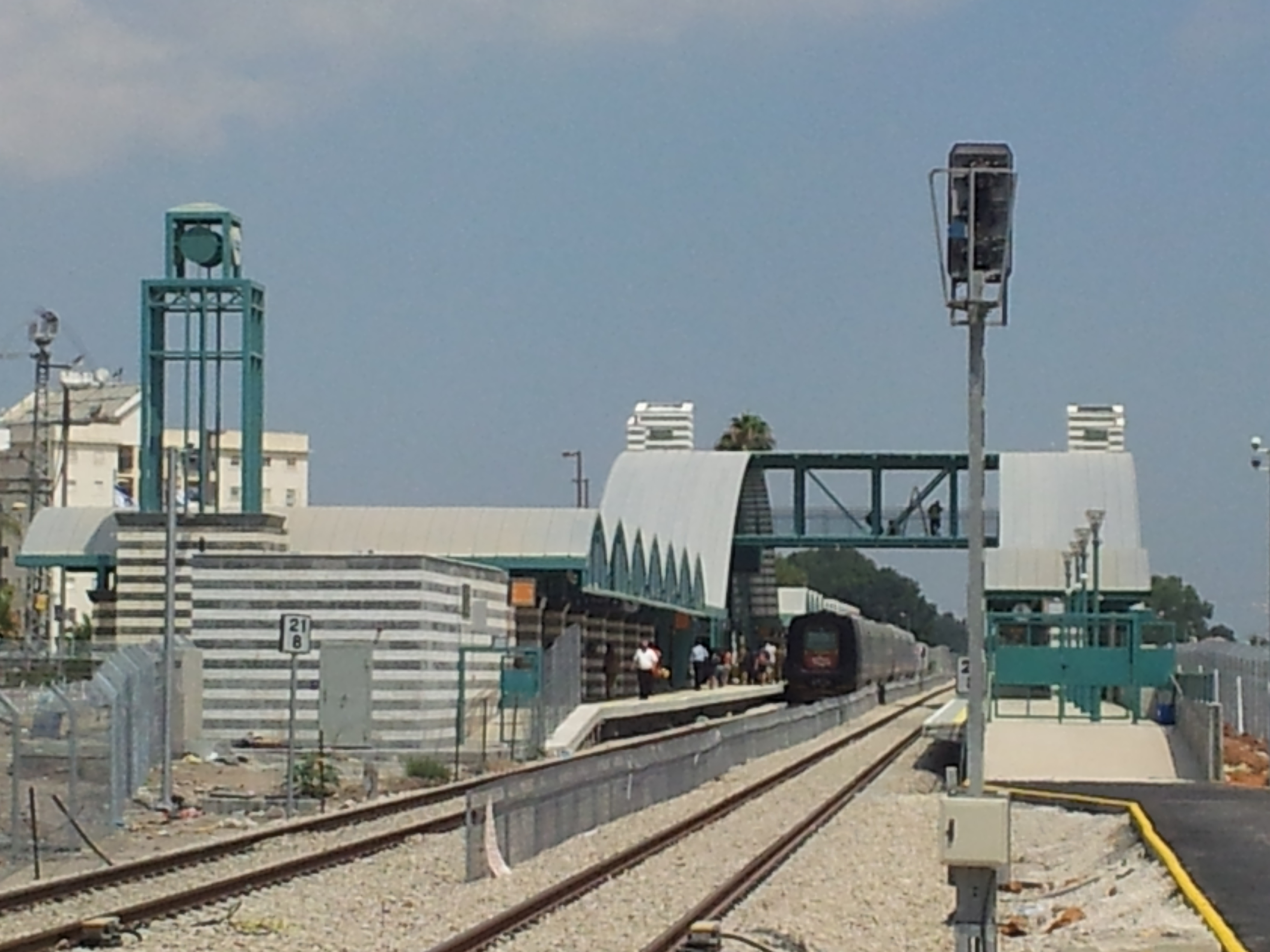

General information
- Location: Eli Cohen Street, Ramla
- Coordinates: 31°55′45.68″N 34°52′36.62″E
- Owner: Israel Railways
- Line: Tel Aviv - Jerusalem
- Platforms: 2
- Tracks: 2

Construction
- Accessible: yes

History
- Opened: April 1891
- Closed: 1998
- Rebuilt: 2003, 2012

Passengers
- 2019: 861,166
- Rank: 44 out of 68

Services
Preceding station	Israel Railways	Following station
Lod towards Nahariya	Nahariya–Beersheba	Mazkeret Batya towards Be'er Sheva–Center
Lod towards Netanya	Netanya–Beit Shemesh	Beit Shemesh Terminus
Location

Ramla railway station is a railway station in Ramla, Israel, on the Tel Aviv–Beit Shemesh–Jerusalem line. The station is located in the east of Ramla. The station is also on a section shared with the Be'er Sheva–Tel Aviv line, which branches out in a southerly direction about 3 km east of Ramla.

== History ==
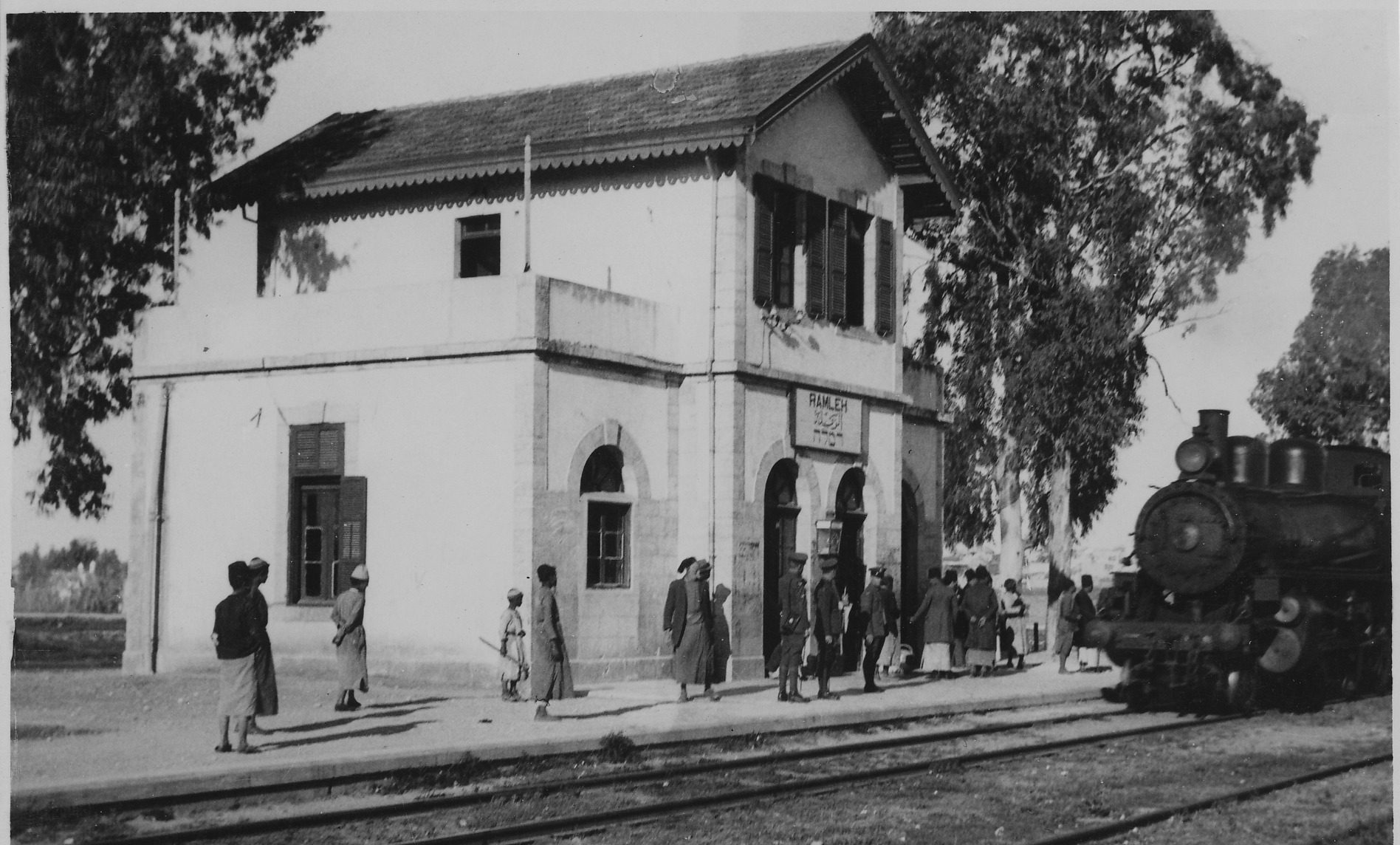
Original Ramla station building, circa 1930

Ramla Station was built as part of the Jaffa–Jerusalem railway, 22.5 km to the southeast of the Jaffa railway station; the first service to Jaffa began in April 1891. The original Jaffa railway station closed in 1948, when the line's western terminus was changed to Tel Aviv's Beit Hadar station (also known as the Customs House station), thus making Ramla the oldest active railway station in Israel.

During the unrest of the 1947–1948 Civil War in Mandatory Palestine the original station building was bombed by the Irgun on 27 May 1947.

In the 1950s a small concrete halt was built. On August 14, 1998, the station was closed since the section of line between Jerusalem and the Beit Shemesh railway station ceased operating due to deteriorating track conditions; the station was not served by trains to Beersheba at the time.

In 2001 it was decided to relocate the station to the west, closer to Ramla's city center and adjacent to the Ramla central bus station and civic center. The new Ramla station was opened on April 12, 2003, and service to Jerusalem resumed on April 9, 2005, the line having been completely renovated after being out of service for six years.

As part of the double-tracking and upgrading project of the Lod–Beersheba main line, the size of the station was doubled in 2012, and services to Beersheba commenced. Also as part of the project, the railway's route no longer passes next to the original 1891–1998 station location (which was located at 31.9231°N 34.8809°E).

=== Ramla West railway station ===
When suburban service to the Rehovot railway station, on the Lod–Ashkelon line commenced in 1990, a halt named Ramla West constructed on the line just south of the then-level crossing (now grade separation) with Road 44. Plans were made to build a station at the halt's location, and the Armon architectural firm was chosen for this purpose. However, due to its inconvenient location it was not popular and was removed from the line's course after just few months.

== Services ==
There is hourly train service in each direction to and from Tel Aviv and Beit Shemesh, and a half-hourly train service in each direction to Nahariya via Tel Aviv and Haifa and Beersheba via Kiryat Gat.
