= Tira–Kokhav Ya'ir railway station =

Railway station in Israel

Tira–Kokhav Ya'ir טירה – כוכב יאיר
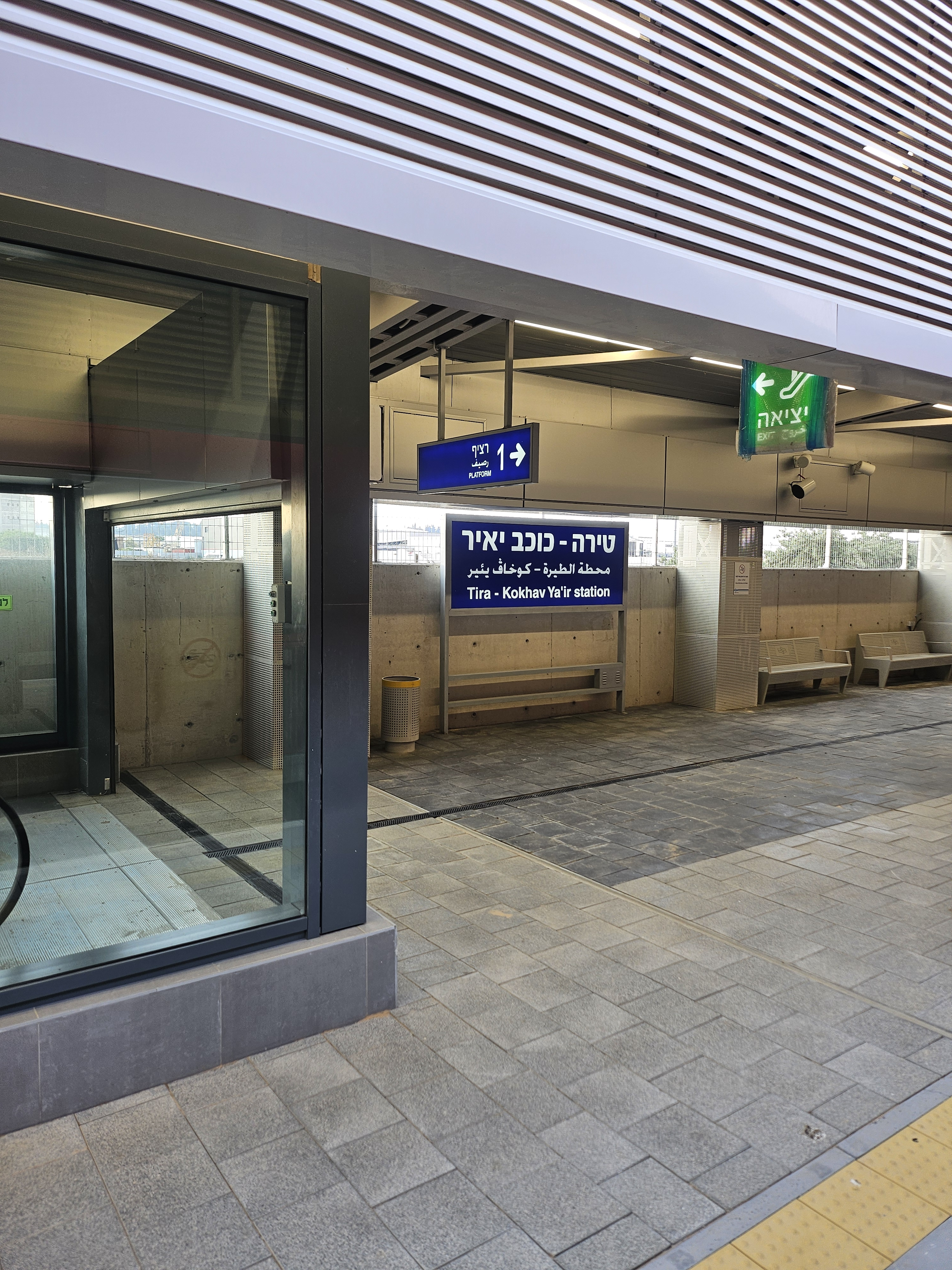
- Platform of the station

General information
- Location: Highway 6, Tira
- Coordinates: 32.229768°N 34.97707°E
- Owner: Israel Railways
- Line: Eastern Railway
- Platforms: 2
- Tracks: 2

History
- Opened: 28 June 2026
Location

Tira–Kokhav Ya'ir railway station (Hebrew: תחנת הרכבת טירה – כוכב יאיר, Arabic: محطة قطار الطيرة – كوخاڤ يئير) is an Israel Railway station that opened on 28 June 2026 as part of the Eastern Railway. It is intended to service the city of Tira and the town of Kokhav Ya'ir–Tsur Yig'al.

== History ==
Shomron–Tayyiba station corresponds to the historic Qalqilya/Eyal railway station, which was first built by Palestine Railways during the British Mandate. The station was built slightly north of the city of Qalqilya to enable it to serve other villages in the region.. The station, like almost the entire Eastern Railway, was conquered by the recently established State of Israel in the 1948 Arab–Israeli War, and was therefore located on the Israeli side of the Green Line, separating it from the city of Qalqilya which became part of the West Bank. The station kept the name Qalqilya as late as 1949, but was later renamed after the kibbutz Eyal.

In 1953, Israel Railways completed constructing the Coastal Railway from Hadera to Tel Aviv on a route roughly paralleling the Eastern Railway's, but much closer to the coastline, where most of the population resides. Nevertheless, some passenger and freight service on the Eastern railway continued operating, partly to show Israeli presence in the region around the railway which lay very close to the 1949 Armistice Line – then the country's eastern border with Jordan. After Israel came to control both sides of the Armistice Line following the 1967 Six-Day War, service on the section of the line from just south of the Hadera East railway station to Kfar Saba, which included Eyal station, was discontinued in 1969. This railway section was effectively abandoned, and had since then been dismantled.

The Tira–Kokhav Ya'ir station's opening date in June of 2026 was criticized as politically-motivated, as it coincided with the lead-up to the 2026 Israeli legislative election; the Railway's professional elements preferred a later opening date in Q3 2027 to enable the line's electrification to be complete before its opening. The station's location was also criticized as being far away from Tira's built-up area, and offering poor public transport connectivity between the city and the station. However, routing the rail line through the center of Tira would have forced the destruction of hundreds of houses, which was avoided by having the new railway follow the existing right-of-way.
