= Shomron–Tayyiba railway station =

Railway station in Israel

Shomron–Tayyiba שומרון – טייבה

General information
- Location: Highway 6, Tayibe
- Coordinates: 32.276401°N 34.99666°E
- Owner: Israel Railways
- Line: Eastern Railway
- Platforms: 4
- Tracks: 4

History
- Opened: 28 June 2026
Location

Shomron–Tayyiba railway station (Hebrew: תחנת הרכבת שומרון – טייבה, Arabic: محطة قطار سمارة – الطيبة) is an Israel Railways station that opened on 28 June 2026 as part of the Eastern Railway. It is intended to service the city of Tayibe. Despite its name, it is located in the municipality of Tayibe inside Israel's internationally-recognized territory within the Green Line, rather than in the Samaria Regional Council within the Israeli-occupied West Bank.

== History ==
Shomron–Tayyiba station corresponds to the historic Tulkarm railway station, which was first built by the Ottoman military during the Sinai and Palestine campaign of World War I and entered service on 30 October 1915. In Tulkarm, the Eastern railway was connected to a branch of the Jezreel Valley Railway, and through it to the greater Hejaz Railway, as well as an extension to Hadera built in order to supply the railway with timber collected from the forests around Hadera that was used as fuel and for infrastructure. The station, like the Eastern railway as a whole, was situated relatively inland to avoid the reach of naval guns from Royal Navy warships patrolling the Mediterranean coast.

After the British conquered the area, they converted the Eastern Railway to standard gauge and extended it from Hadera north to the port city of Haifa. It then became the main north-south rail link in Mandatory Palestine and was operated by Palestine Railways. While the Jaffa-Jerusalem railway was also converted to standard gauge at the same time, the Jezreel Valley Railway was not and therefore it was no longer possible for trains using the Eastern Railway to travel to sections of the Hejaz Railway due to the gauge break. Tulkarm served as the interchange station between the two railways.

While most of the Eastern Railway was conquered by the recently established State of Israel in the 1948 Arab–Israeli War, a small section of railway near Tulkarm, including the station itself, were instead conquered by Jordan and therefore fell within the West Bank. In 1949 a bypass was constructed west of Tulkarm, within Israeli territory, which allowed renewal of service on the railway.

On 19 May 2026, Prime Minister Benjamin Netanyahu and Transport Minister Miri Regev opened the Shomron–Tayyiba railway station. At the ceremony, they spoke of opening the entire Eastern Railway for passenger service by the end of 2026. The ceremony was boycotted by the mayor of Tayibe, Yahya Hajj Yahya, in protest of a government decision to include references to Samaria in the station's name to placate its base of supporters among the West Bank settlers, contrary to Israel Railways' professional name committee's decision to name the station simply "Tayibe station"; it was instead attended by the chairman of the Samaria Regional Council, Yossi Dagan. The opening's timing in June of 2026 was criticized as politically-motivated, as it coincided with the lead-up to the 2026 Israeli legislative election; the Railway's professional elements preferred a later opening date in Q3 2027 to enable the line's electrification to be complete before its opening. The station's location was also criticized as being far away from Tayibe's built-up area, and offering poor public transport connectivity between the city and the station. However, routing the rail line through the center of Tayibe would have forced the destruction of hundreds of houses, which was avoided by having the new railway follow the existing right-of-way, and the station's location allows for it to be used by the nearby Arab city of Qalansawe as well.
