= Be'er Sheva–North railway station =

Railway station in Beersheba, Israel

Coordinates: 31.2618°N 34.8092°E

Be'er Sheva–North באר שבע – צפון
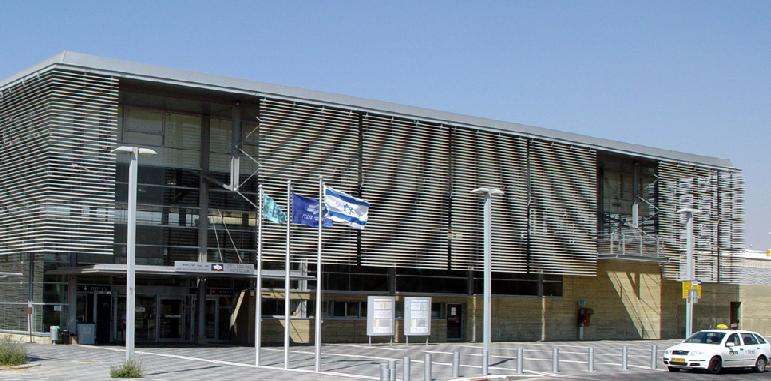

General information
- Location: Haharoshet St
- Owner: Israel Railways
- Lines: Nahariya–Haifa–Tel Aviv–Beersheba; Rosh HaAyin–Tel Aviv–Rishon LeZion–Ashkelon–Beersheba; Beersheba–Dimona
- Platforms: 3

Construction
- Accessible: yes

History
- Opened: 29 March 1956; 70 years ago
- Rebuilt: 2005
- Electrified: 27 March 2026; 4 months ago

Passengers
- 2019: 2,308,782
- Rank: 20 out of 68
Location

Be'er Sheva–North railway station (Hebrew: תחנת הרכבת באר שבע – צפון, Takhanat HaRakevet Be-er Sheva Tzafon) (also known as the University Train Station) is an Israel Railways station in Beersheba. It is a stop on the intercity line from Tel Aviv and the terminus of the Beersheba–Dimona branch line.

The station is located on HaHaroshet Street and is connected to the Ben-Gurion University of the Negev by Mexico Bridge, a covered pedestrian walkway. Another covered pedestrian bridge from the station leads to the technology office park located across the rail yard to the north.

The station complex also includes a large rail yard and a rolling stock maintenance depot.

== History ==
After the closure of the old Turkish station and railroad south of the town in 1927, the Railway to Beersheba mainly served the phosphate and other mineral industries in the Negev. The first passenger train station at the site opened on March 29, 1956. Between then and the opening of Be'er Sheva Center in 2000 it was the only active railway station in Beersheba.

In 2002, it was decided to move the passenger terminal at Be'er Sheva North 350 meters northwards to a new building nearby the university and an additional island platform was built. The new Be'er Sheva North passenger terminal opened in 2005.

Until the mid-2000s, the station complex also included a freight rail terminal which was closed when the freight terminal in Ne'ot Hovav opened.

== Train service ==
Station layout

Preceding station	Israel Railways	Following station
Lehavim–Rahat towards Nahariya	Nahariya–Beersheba	Be'er Sheva–Center Terminus
Kiryat Gat towards Karmiel	Karmiel–Beersheba	Be'er Sheva–Center Terminus
Ofakim towards Binyamina	Binyamina–Beersheba	Be'er Sheva–Center Terminus
Ofakim towards Ashkelon	Ashkelon–Beersheba	Be'er Sheva–Center Terminus
Terminus	Beersheba–Dimona	Dimona Terminus
