= Israel Railways =

State-owned Israeli railway company

רכבת ישראל בע"מ Israel Railways Ltd.

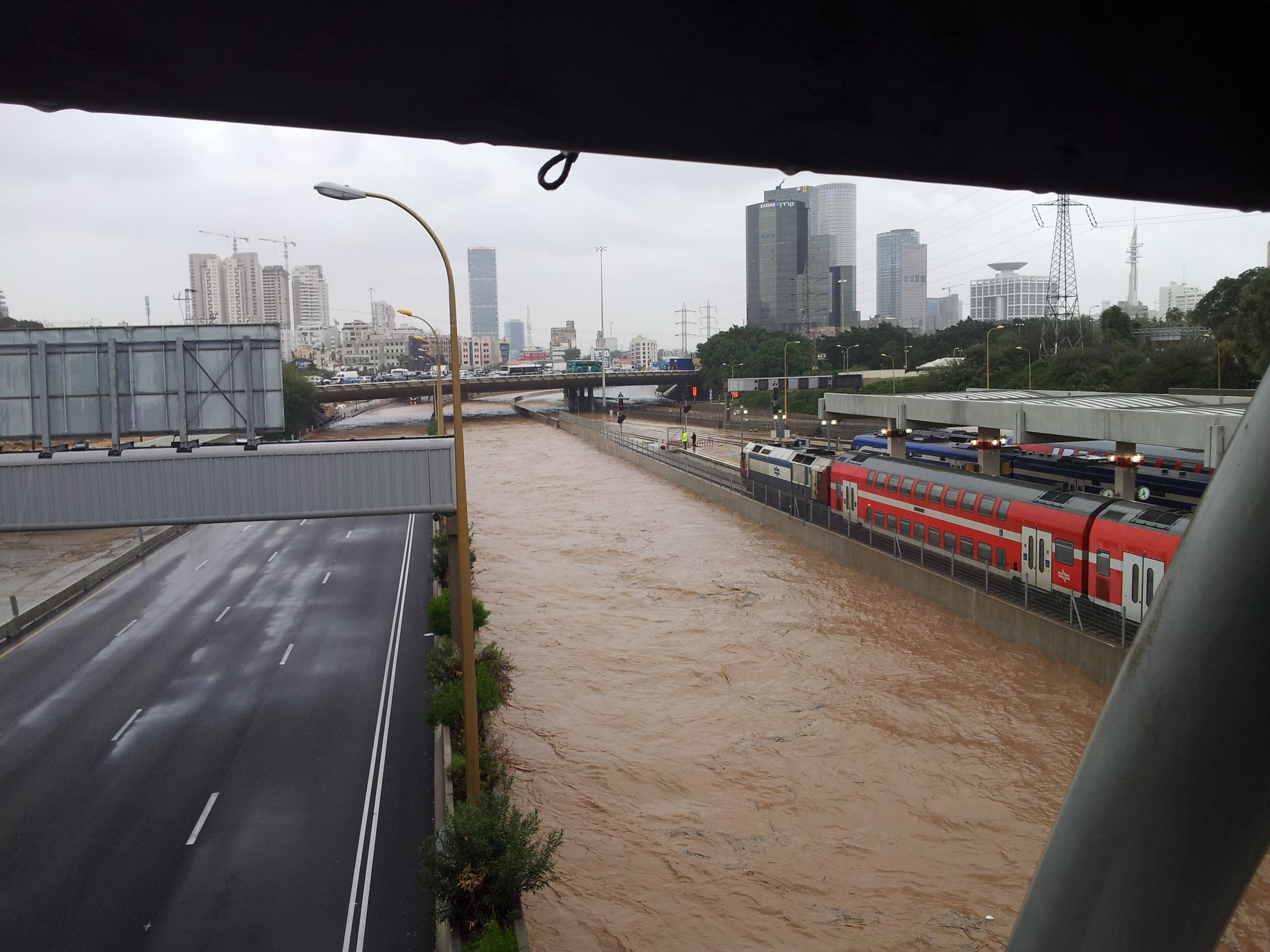
- View of Tel Aviv–Savidor Center railway station
- Type: State owned
- Industry: Railways
- Headquarters: Lod railway station, Lod, Israel
- Area served: Israel
- Key people: Avshalom Elmaliach (Interim CEO)
- Services: Rail transport, Commuter rail, Cargo transport
- Revenue: ▲ ₪940+ million (2015)
- Operating income: ▲ ₪1 billion (2016)
- Net income: ▲₪1.5 billion (2014)
- Owner: Government of Israel
- Number of employees: 4,995 (2025)
- Website: www.rail.co.il

רכבת ישראל Israel Railways

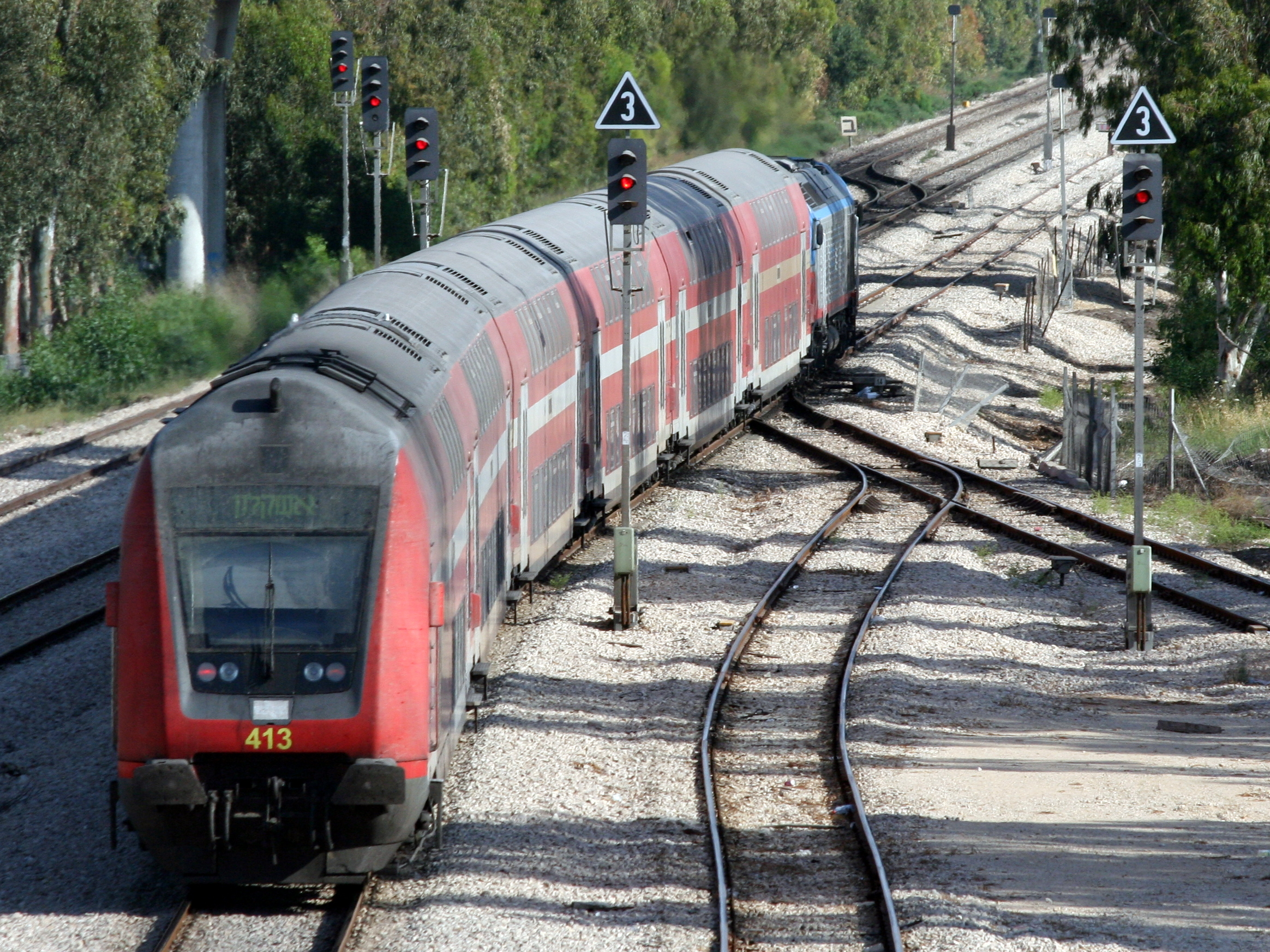

Overview
- Stations called at: 66
- Locale: Israel
- Dates of operation: 1948–present

Technical
- Track gauge: 1,435 mm (4 ft 8 1/2 in)
- Electrification: In the process of conversion to electric; 25 kV, 50 Hz overhead wire (72% complete)
- Length: 1541 km

Other
- Website: www.rail.co.il

Israel Railways (Hebrew: רַכֶּבֶת יִשְׂרָאֵל, Rakevet Yisra'el) is the state-owned principal railway company responsible for all inter-city, commuter, and freight rail transport in Israel. Israel Railways network consists of 1,541 kilometers (958 mi) of track. All its lines are standard gauge but some were originally built to other gauges and later regauged. Electrification began in 2018 with the new line to Jerusalem and there are plans to electrify the entire network at 25 kV 50 Hz supplied via overhead line. The network is centered in Israel's densely populated coastal plain, from which lines radiate out in many directions. In 2025, Israel Railways carried 71.8 million passengers.

Unlike road vehicles and city trams, Israeli heavy rail trains run on the left hand tracks, matching neighboring Egypt and other Middle Eastern countries, whose formerly connected rail networks were constructed by British engineers. Those lines that formerly crossed Israel's borders were severed during the 1948 Palestine war and as of 2026 there are no international train lines or services to or from Israel.

Until 1980, the company's head office was located at Haifa Center HaShmona railway station. Tzvi Tzafriri, the general manager of Israel Railways, decided to move the head office to Tel Aviv–Savidor Center railway station. In 2017, the company's head office was moved to a new campus built on the grounds of the Lod railway station.

Until 2002, it was a subsidiary of the Israel Port Authority when it was reconstituted as a state company.

== Stations ==
There are 66 stations on the Israel Railways network, with almost all of the stations being accessible to disabled persons, with public announcement and passenger information systems, vending machines and parking.

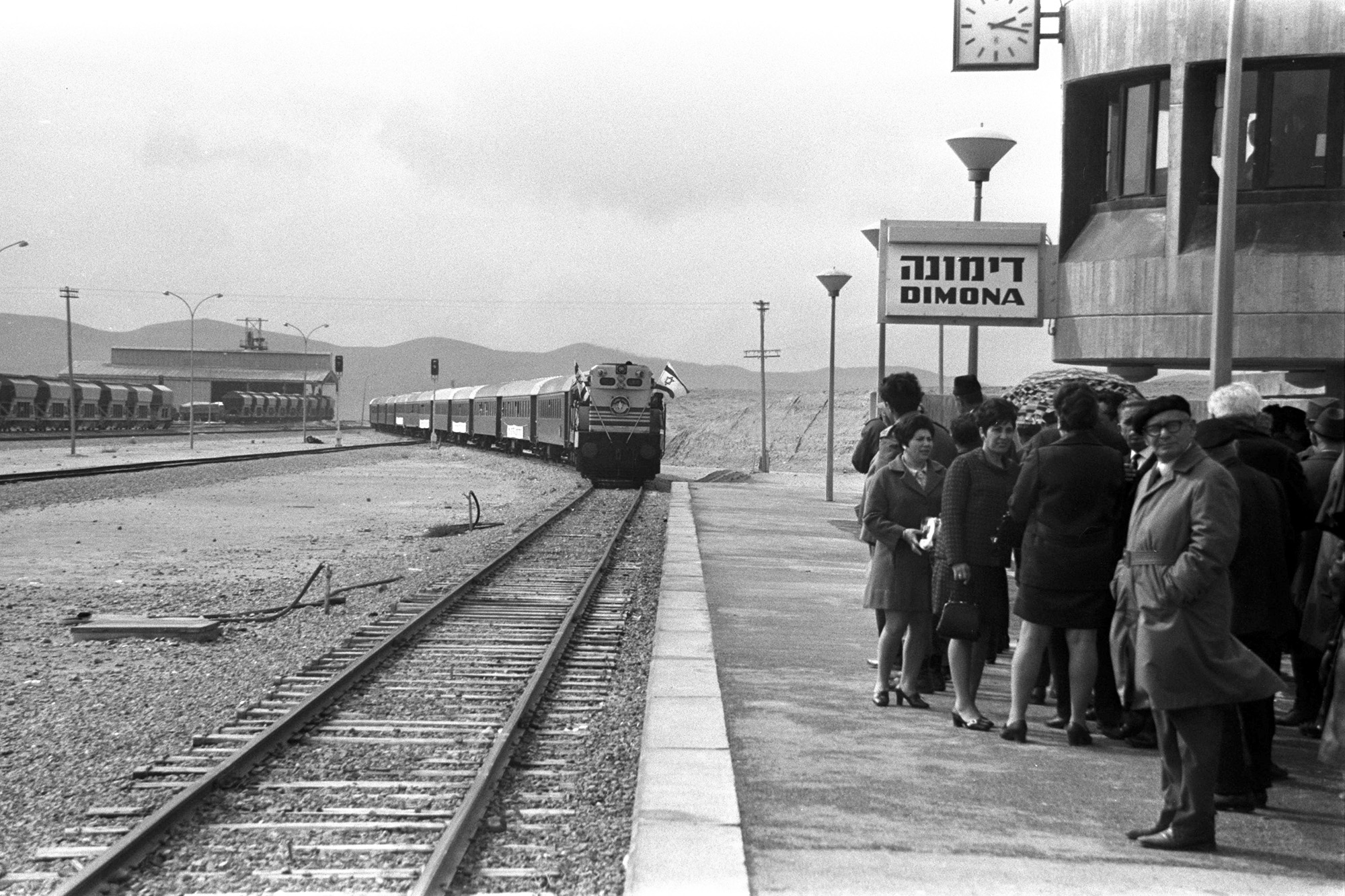
Dimona train station, 1970

=== Bicycle policy ===
Bicycles are permitted on trains in designated coaches.

Israel Railways encourages people to use bicycles by building a double-deck parking for bicycles in every railway station and by allowing people to take bicycles with them on trains to minimise the need for private cars.

=== Smoking ===
In Israel, smoking is prohibited in public enclosed places and in commercial areas. Although smoking in railway stations is allowed in designated areas, the sale of tobacco from automated vending machines is prohibited.

=== List of stations ===
Station		Passengers							Municipality	District
Code	Name	2019	2020	2021	2022	2023	2024	2025	Municipality	District
16	Nahariya	3,076,039	1,241,173	1,915,761	2,529,474	2,786,773	2,691,277	3,208,498	Nahariya	Northern
13	Akko (Acre)	2,043,343	732,180	1,067,444	1,471,117	1,633,823	1,629,758	1,833,776	Acre	Northern
62	Afula	776,477	268,214	495,069	722,153	848,136	953,123	1,021,353	Afula	Northern
63	Beit She'an–David Levy	442,417	162,902	295,790	427,176	477,532	541,605	570,641	Beit She'an	Northern
61	Migdal HaEmek–Kfar Baruch	259,977	85,531	138,467	210,073	242,584	256,519	264,047	Kfar Baruch (Jezreel Valley)	Northern
60	Yokneam–Kfar Yehoshua	339,789	122,210	224,054	327,172	346,705	385,978	432,412	Kfar Yehoshua (Jezreel Valley)	Northern
64	Ahihud	276,018	102,243	148,278	199,027	217,301	188,295	253,104	Ahihud (Mateh Asher)	Northern
65	Karmiel	1,923,674	675,621	1,119,308	1,468,695	1,604,924	1,697,825	1,853,980	Karmiel	Northern
12	Kiryat Motzkin	2,376,278	844,709	1,317,716	1,766,157	2,026,956	2,137,667	2,372,426	Kiryat Motzkin/Haifa	Haifa
11	Kiryat Haim	480,814	171,289	257,428	350,175	356,702	362,000	373,989	Haifa	Haifa
10	Hutzot HaMifratz	626,017	245,094	419,471	567,226	589,480	597,921	673,231	Haifa	Haifa
38	HaMifratz Central	2,984,821	1,113,062	1,642,487	2,774,923	3,133,350	3,291,205	3,562,105	Haifa	Haifa
25	Haifa Center–HaShmona	2,242,279	773,862	1,066,835	1,662,346	1,900,193	1,832,421	2,025,032	Haifa	Haifa
9	Haifa–Bat Galim	2,282,213	874,919	1,480,565	1,906,404	2,176,367	2,292,048	2,515,870	Haifa	Haifa
14	Haifa–Hof HaCarmel	4,648,766	1,630,110	2,425,278	3,304,744	3,728,929	4,021,830	4,365,806	Haifa	Haifa
8	Atlit	363,614	143,931	254,038	346,930	413,171	481,721	514,806	Atlit (Hof HaCarmel)	Haifa
6	Binyamina	3,336,093	1,206,294	1,954,827	2,659,029	3,272,180	3,751,782	3,951,298	Binyamina-Giv'at Ada	Haifa
7	Caesarea–Pardes Hanna	1,339,506	477,264	749,923	998,446	1,169,903	1,349,801	1,491,010	Pardes Hanna-Karkur/Caesarea (Hof HaCarmel)	Haifa
5	Hadera–West	2,430,825	879,112	1,424,860	1,990,340	2,297,204	2,709,587	2,888,668	Hadera	Haifa
	Hadera–East	—	—	—	—	—	—	—	Hadera	Haifa
	Shomron–Tayyiba	—	—	—	—	—	—	—	Tayibe/ Qalansuwa	Central
	Tira–Kokhav Ya'ir	—	—	—	—	—	—	—	Tira/Kokhav Ya'ir–Tsur Yig'al	Central
4	Netanya	3,563,026	1,212,729	1,596,659	2,508,795	3,008,301	3,360,302	3,579,278	Netanya	Central
59	Netanya–Sapir	1,155,205	407,584	630,966	958,546	1,149,964	1,318,750	1,406,963	Netanya	Central
3	Beit Yehoshua	2,056,937	675,390	1,052,922	1,469,031	1,643,073	1,853,644	1,938,480	Beit Yehoshua (Hof HaSharon)	Central
2	Herzliya	3,004,648	1,008,077	1,795,033	3,287,493	3,960,370	4,695,054	4,925,064	Herzliya	Tel Aviv
66	Ra'anana–West	265,006	58,882	120,302	379,791	541,332	454,124	619,249	Ra'anana/Herzliya	Central
67	Ra'anana–South	233,114	50,494	68,938	149,799	226,814	214,320	288,556	Ra'anana/Kfar Saba	Central
44	Hod HaSharon–Sokolov	926,654	185,951	247,703	513,615	774,572	714,525	961,141	Hod HaSharon/Kfar Saba	Central
15	Kfar Saba–Nordau	1,373,963	286,105	398,644	817,390	1,054,734	876,856	1,156,304	Hod HaSharon/Kfar Saba	Central
27	Rosh HaAyin–North	1,573,945	475,460	519,834	1,111,224	1,228,811	946,942	1,202,873	Rosh HaAyin	Central
34	Petah Tikva–Segula	905,440	237,701	221,772	477,782	609,412	362,148	478,312	Petah Tikva	Central
45	Petah Tikva–Kiryat Aryeh	1,943,818	528,942	477,782	1,145,391	1,372,580	733,924	931,587	Petah Tikva	Central
35	Bnei Brak–Ramat HaHayal	1,271,141	320,820	282,841	604,381	707,608	463,762	621,002	Bnei Brak	Tel Aviv
36	Tel Aviv–University	6,499,857	1,883,810	3,132,561	4,931,804	5,173,681	5,573,299	5,951,321	Tel Aviv	Tel Aviv
1	Tel Aviv–Savidor Center	13,426,398	4,980,537	6,476,362	9,384,612	10,687,304	12,359,619	13,400,789	Tel Aviv/Ramat Gan	Tel Aviv
23	Tel Aviv–HaShalom	15,352,944	5,635,092	8,425,111	13,220,102	15,309,116	16,642,898	17,209,007	Tel Aviv	Tel Aviv
39	Tel Aviv–HaHagana	6,596,080	2,516,573	3,659,147	5,309,215	5,920,733	5,147,085	5,382,799	Tel Aviv	Tel Aviv
50	Holon Junction	629,715	182,892	162,413	376,879	381,951	267,747	310,567	Holon/Tel Aviv	Tel Aviv
51	Holon–Wolfson	823,403	281,062	256,297	615,392	672,254	591,007	597,282	Holon/Tel Aviv	Tel Aviv
52	Bat Yam–Yoseftal	1,810,003	584,714	685,830	1,199,082	1,364,502	1,323,236	1,338,495	Holon/Bat Yam	Tel Aviv
53	Bat Yam–Komemiyut	934,648	288,396	274,700	611,642	669,802	560,800	637,255	Holon/Bat Yam	Tel Aviv
40	Ben Gurion Airport	4,383,073	788,867	881,276	2,948,403	4,339,102	3,737,967	4,700,437	Ben Gurion Airport (unincorporated area)	Central
22	Kfar Chabad	416,411	163,848	267,515	393,541	454,156	561,060	608,857	Kfar Chabad (Sdot Dan)	Central
46	Lod–Ganei Aviv	525,198	215,892	305,990	386,895	410,009	475,926	474,302	Lod	Central
20	Lod	2,489,889	965,369	1,283,229	1,735,282	2,076,207	2,278,605	2,390,666	Lod	Central
26	Ramla	861,166	336,700	452,460	668,712	708,128	734,069	772,316	Ramla	Central
48	Paatei Modi'in	391,832	120,963	225,461	515,597	667,989	860,051	1,020,603	Modi'in-Maccabim-Re'ut	Central
49	Modi'in–Center	1,711,198	594,652	957,050	1,762,050	2,169,093	2,326,657	2,458,515	Modi'in-Maccabim-Re'ut	Central
18	Beit Shemesh	930,014	316,171	482,584	629,960	773,853	842,785	884,357	Beit Shemesh	Jerusalem
69	Jerusalem–Yitzhak Navon	2,674,840	1,651,659	3,598,443	6,536,393	7,916,255	8,453,593	9,493,864	Jerusalem	Jerusalem
17	Biblical Zoo (closed from March 2020)	26,445	1,403	—	—	—	—	—	Jerusalem	Jerusalem
41	Jerusalem–Malha (closed from March 2020)	115,118	17,744	—	—	—	—	—	Jerusalem	Jerusalem
54	Rishon LeZion–Moshe Dayan	2,217,849	596,198	670,612	1,296,274	1,438,904	1,522,427	1,761,595	Rishon LeZion	Central
31	Rishon LeZion–HaRishonim	360,136	111,024	137,386	36,809	134,771	164,162	171,138	Rishon LeZion	Central
28	Be'er Ya'akov	777,819	294,761	444,211	569,267	779,887	930,267	971,876	Be'er Ya'akov	Central
29	Rehovot	3,855,766	1,395,040	1,654,749	2,199,938	2,606,104	2,779,919	3,022,117	Rehovot	Central
55	Yavne–West	1,465,638	483,214	647,974	1,188,447	1,264,794	1,295,831	1,481,547	Yavne	Central
30	Yavne–East	470,468	154,927	169,294	284,367	283,932	355,895	409,680	Yavne	Central
70	Mazkeret Batya	243,989	177,890	315,499	457,064	534,723	652,019	675,757	Mazkeret Batya	Central
32	Ashdod–Ad Halom	3,765,864	1,273,176	1,590,702	2,727,842	2,785,203	2,868,863	3,400,800	Ashdod	Southern
42	Ashkelon	3,005,131	1,026,198	1,220,611	2,290,614	2,484,857	2,846,206	3,200,125	Ashkelon	Southern
56	Sderot	1,025,670	359,793	398,278	635,242	448,712	123,524	568,261	Sderot	Southern
57	Netivot	970,450	382,667	480,892	710,581	524,149	303,495	608,131	Netivot	Southern
58	Ofakim	864,528	331,842	415,333	575,277	394,402	245,086	548,053	Ofakim	Southern
68	Kiryat Mal'akhi–Yoav	360,569	135,497	233,242	320,860	374,038	458,468	446,440	Kfar Menahem (Yoav)	Southern
19	Kiryat Gat	1,175,058	479,342	714,533	1,018,644	1,091,138	1,197,626	1,195,184	Kiryat Gat	Southern
47	Lehavim–Rahat	438,867	158,862	246,747	316,435	392,104	433,534	463,511	Lehavim/Rahat	Southern
21	Be'er Sheva–North	2,308,782	890,926	1,244,946	1,822,170	1,789,126	2,041,940	2,068,277	Beersheba	Southern
37	Be'er Sheva–Center	3,562,792	1,331,920	2,030,811	2,650,516	2,472,486	2,628,172	2,764,454	Beersheba	Southern
43	Dimona	14,745	5,278	7,969	6,397	12,277	18,178	23,269	Dimona	Southern

== Lines ==
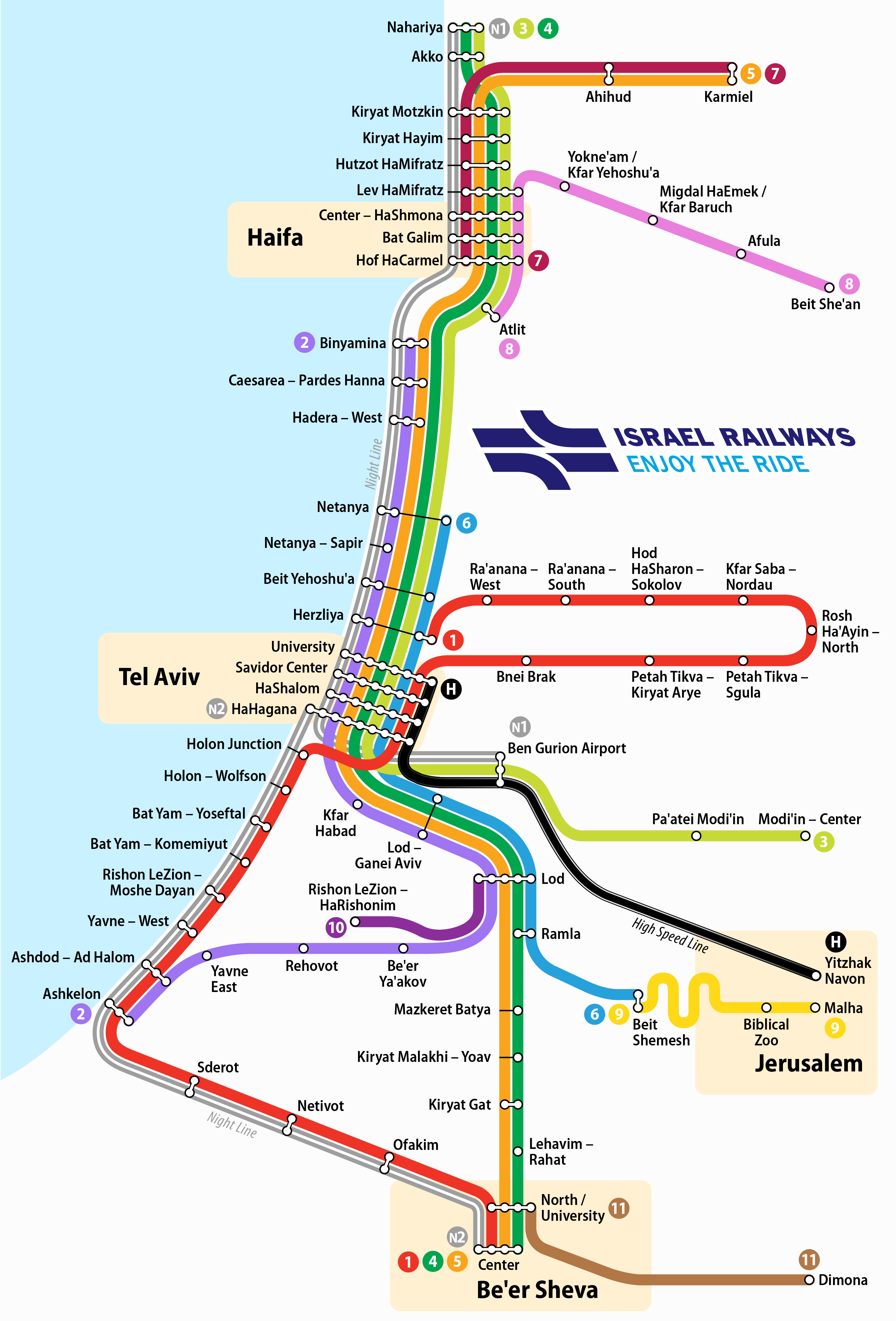
Schematic diagram of Israel Railways passenger services

Regional map of past and present railway lines

Israel Railways currently operates 15 passenger service lines. These can be broadly subdivided into inter-city lines, which connect two or more of Israel's major metropolitan centres (Tel Aviv, Jerusalem, Haifa, and Beersheba), usually skipping some of the intermediate stations, and commuter lines, centered on one metropolitan area and serving all stations on the line. However, Israel Railways no longer officially uses this classification.

Some services were partially or fully suspended as a result of the COVID-19 pandemic and electrification works.

=== Inter-city lines ===
Corridor	Service	Terminus (start)	Intermediate stops	Terminus (end)	Infrastructure
Haifa– Tel Aviv– Beersheba	Nahariya–Beersheba (partially commuter) ‡	Nahariya	17: Akko; Kiryat Motzkin; HaMifrats Central; Haifa Center; Haifa–Bat Galim; Haifa–Hof HaCarmel; Tel Aviv–University; Tel Aviv–Savidor Center; Tel Aviv–HaShalom; Tel Aviv–HaHagana; Lod; Ramla; Mazkeret Batya; Kiryat Mal'akhi-Yoav; Kiryat Gat; Lehavim–Rahat; Be'er Sheva–North	Be'er Sheva–Center	Coastal railway Ayalon railway Jaffa–Jerusalem railway South railway
Haifa– Tel Aviv– Beersheba	Karmiel–Beersheba ‡	Karmiel	15: Ahihud; Akko; Kiryat Motzkin; HaMifrats Central; Haifa–Center; Haifa–Bat Galim; Haifa–Hof HaCarmel; Hadera–West; Tel Aviv–University; Tel Aviv–Savidor Center; Tel Aviv–HaShalom; Tel Aviv–HaHagana; Lod; Kiryat Gat; Be'er Sheva–North	Be'er Sheva–Center	Karmiel–Acre railway Coastal railway Ayalon railway Jaffa–Jerusalem railway South railway
Haifa– Tel Aviv	Nahariya–Modi'in (partially commuter) ‡	Nahariya	16: Akko; Kiryat Motzkin; Kiryat Haim; Hutzot HaMifratz; HaMifrats Central; Haifa–Center; Haifa–Bat Galim; Haifa–Hof HaCarmel; Atlit; Binyamina; Tel Aviv–University; Tel Aviv–Savidor Center; Tel Aviv–HaShalom; Tel Aviv–HaHagana; Ben Gurion Airport; Pa'atei Modi'in	Modi'in Center	Coastal railway Ayalon railway Tel Aviv–Jerusalem railway Anava–Modi'in railway
Haifa– Tel Aviv	Nahariya–Ben Gurion Airport (night train)	Nahariya	9: Akko; Kiryat Motzkin; Haifa–Center; Haifa–Hof HaCarmel; Binyamina; Hadera West; Netanya; Tel Aviv–Savidor Center; Tel Aviv–HaHagana	Ben Gurion Airport	Coastal railway Ayalon railway Tel Aviv–Jerusalem railway
Hadera-Tel Aviv– Jerusalem	Hadera–Jerusalem †	Hadera–West	7: Netanya; Beit Yehoshua; Herzliya; Tel Aviv–University; Tel Aviv–HaShalom; Tel Aviv–HaHagana; Ben Gurion Airport	Jerusalem–Yitzhak Navon	Coastal railway Ayalon railway Tel Aviv–Jerusalem railway
Tel Aviv– Jerusalem	Tel Aviv–Jerusalem (night train) †	Tel Aviv–Savidor Center	Ben Gurion Airport	Jerusalem–Yitzhak Navon (closed Wednesdays for maintenance)	Ayalon railway Tel Aviv–Jerusalem railway
Tel Aviv– Beersheba	~~Tel Aviv–Beersheba~~ (night train, suspended) ‡	Tel Aviv–Savidor Center	4: Tel Aviv–HaHagana; Ben Gurion Airport; Lod; Kiryat Gat	Be'er Sheva–Center	Ayalon railway Tel Aviv–Jerusalem railway Jaffa–Jerusalem railway South railway
Hadera - Rosh HaAyin	Hadera East - Rosh HaAyin North	Hadera–East	Shomron–Tayyiba Tira–Kokhav Ya'ir	Rosh HaAyin–North	Eastern Railway

=== Commuter lines ===
Metropolitan core	Service	Terminus (start)	Intermediate stops	Terminus (end)	Infrastructure
Haifa	Nahariya–Binyamina (inter-city connection)	Nahariya	9: Akko; Kiryat Motzkin; Kiryat Haim; Hutzot HaMifratz; HaMifratz Central; Haifa–Center; Haifa–Bat Galim; Haifa–Hof HaCarmel; Atlit	Binyamina inter-city to Modi'in →	Coastal railway
Haifa	Karmiel–Haifa	Karmiel	8: Ahihud; Akko; Kiryat Motzkin; Kiryat Haim; Hutzot HaMifratz; HaMifratz Central; Haifa–Center; Haifa–Bat Galim	Haifa–Hof HaCarmel	Karmiel–Acre railway Coastal railway
Haifa	Beit She'an–Atlit	Beit She'an	7: Afula; Migdal HaEmek–Kfar Baruch; Yokneam–Kfar Yehoshua; HaMifratz Central; Haifa–Center; Haifa–Bat Galim; Haifa–Hof HaCarmel	Atlit	Jezreel Valley railway Coastal railway
Tel Aviv	Binyamina–Ashkelon (commuter connection) †	Binyamina	17: Caesarea-Pardes Hanna; Hadera West; Netanya; Netanya–Sapir; Beit Yehoshua; Herzliya; Tel Aviv–University; Tel Aviv–Savidor Center; Tel Aviv–HaShalom; Tel Aviv–HaHagana; Kfar Chabad; Lod–Ganei Aviv; Lod; Be'er Ya'akov; Rehovot; Yavne–East; Ashdod–Ad Halom	Ashkelon commuter to Beersheba →	Coastal railway Ayalon railway Jaffa–Jerusalem railway Lod–Ashkelon railway
Tel Aviv	Herzliya–Ashkelon †	Herzliya	18: Ra'anana–South; Hod HaSharon–Sokolov; Kfar Saba–Nordau; Rosh HaAyin North; Petah Tikva–Sgula; Petah Tikva–Kiryat Aryeh; Bnei Brak; Tel Aviv–University; Tel Aviv–Savidor Center; Tel Aviv–HaShalom; Tel Aviv–HaHagana; Holon Junction; Holon–Wolfson; Bat Yam–Yoseftal; Bat Yam–Komemiyut; Rishon LeZion–Moshe Dayan; Yavne–West; Ashdod–Ad Halom	Ashkelon	Sharon railway Eastern railway Yarkon railway Ayalon railway Tel Aviv–Bnei Darom railway Lod–Ashkelon railway
Tel Aviv	Netanya–Beit Shemesh ‡	Netanya	9: Beit Yehoshua; Herzliya; Tel Aviv–University; Tel Aviv–Savidor Center; Tel Aviv–HaShalom; Tel Aviv–HaHagana; Lod–Ganei Aviv; Lod; Ramla	Beit Shemesh	Coastal railway Ayalon railway Jaffa–Jerusalem railway
Tel Aviv	Netanya–Rehovot †	Netanya	8: Beit Yehoshua; Herzliya; Tel Aviv–University; Tel Aviv–Savidor Center; Tel Aviv–HaShalom; Tel Aviv–HaHagana; Kfar Chabad; Lod	Rehovot	Coastal railway Ayalon railway Jaffa–Jerusalem railway
Tel Aviv	Tel Aviv–Modi'in (inter-city connection)	Tel Aviv–University ← inter-city to Nahariya	5: Tel Aviv Center; Tel Aviv HaShalom; Tel Aviv HaHagana; Ben Gurion Airport; Pa'atei Modi'in	Modi'in–Center	Ayalon railway Tel Aviv–Jerusalem railway Anava–Modi'in railway
Lod–Rishon LeZion	Lod–Rishon LeZion	Lod	–	Rishon LeZion–HaRishonim	Lod–Ashkelon railway
Jerusalem	~~Beit Shemesh–Jerusalem~~ (suspended)	Beit Shemesh	Biblical Zoo	Jerusalem–Malha	Jaffa–Jerusalem railway
Jerusalem	Modi'in–Jerusalem †	Modi'in–Center	Paatei Modi'in	Jerusalem–Yitzhak Navon	Tel Aviv–Jerusalem railway Anava–Modi'in railway
Beersheba	Lod–Beersheba (inter-city connection) ‡	Lod ← inter-city to Nahariya	6: Ramla; Mazkeret Batya; Kiryat Mal'akhi-Yoav; Kiryat Gat; Lehavim-Rahat; Be'er Sheva–North	Be'er Sheva–Center	Jaffa–Jerusalem railway South railway
Beersheba	Ashkelon–Beersheba (commuter connection) ‡	Ashkelon ← commuter to Binyamina	4: Sderot; Netivot; Ofakim; Be'er Sheva–North	Be'er Sheva–Center	Ashkelon–Beersheba railway
Beersheba	Ashkelon–Beersheba ‡	Ashkelon	4: Sderot; Netivot; Ofakim; Be'er Sheva–North	Be'er Sheva–Center	Ashkelon–Beersheba railway
Beersheba	Beersheba–Dimona	Be'er Sheva–North	–	Dimona	Beersheba–Dimona railway

† Fully electrified line
‡ Line electrification in progress

== Future ==
=== Electrification ===
Since the opening of the fully-electrified Tel Aviv–Ben Gurion Airport–Jerusalem railway line in 2018, work has been underway to electrify the passenger rail network with overhead 25 kV 50 Hz AC electrification. In 2024, Israel Railways estimated that work was 72% complete, with full electrification officially scheduled for July 2027.

=== Network expansion ===
Due to increasing demand, Israel Railways is pursuing expansion to its infrastructure network.

The 64 km (40 mi) long Eastern Railway, which will connect Hadera to Kfar Saba and then to Lod, running parallel to the Coastal Railway, began construction in 2019 and is scheduled to open in 2027, with partial opening of the line from Hadera–East to Rosh HaAyin–North occurring at the end of June 2026. This line follows the disused route of the Ottoman-period Tulkarm–Lydda railroad, which was abandoned in 1968, and will allow freight and passenger trains to bypass the congested Hadera–Herzliya corridor.

The 30 km (19 mi) Rishon LeZion–Modi'in Railway also began construction in 2019, with opening planned in 2026. This line will create an east-west link south of Tel Aviv, crossing the Tel Aviv–Ashkelon, Tel Aviv–Beersheba and Tel Aviv–Jerusalem rail corridors.

Since 2019, work is underway to quadruple the 3.5 km (2.2 mi) section of the Ayalon Railway from Tel Aviv Center to Tel Aviv HaHagana, which forms a critical bottleneck for the entire rail network. Upon completion, this project will nearly double the capacity of the corridor, allowing a significant increase in train frequency across the network. Completion is scheduled for 2028.

=== Plans and proposals ===
A 23.5 kilometres (14.6 mi) line from the city of Acre, on the Mediterranean coast, to Karmiel was completed in March 2017. However, this tract bypasses Acre and does not make a stop there; it is planned to be extended north to the north-eastern town of Qiryat Shemona, with future stations also planned for Jadeidi-Makr and Majd al-Krum, though there is no timetable for construction. This line will be fully electrified.

In 2011 the reconstruction and expansion of the 60 kilometres (37 mi) long, formerly abandoned Jezreel Valley railway line connecting Haifa and Beit Shean (near the Jordanian border) started. This was completed in 2016. There has been talk of further extending the line to Irbid, in Jordan (to allow a direct freight connection from Jordan to the Mediterranean Sea); however, no decision has yet been made on this matter. Another proposed extension under discussion would connect the reconstructed Jezreel Valley railway at Afula to Tiberias.

Several proposals have been made to extend Israel's railway network to Eilat, collectively known as the Med-Red railway. The project was approved by the government in 2012 but was indefinitely frozen in 2019. In July 2023, the government revived plans for a nationwide high-speed railway connecting Kiryat Shmona with Eilat via Tel Aviv, Beersheba and Dimona. In August 2025, Netivei Israel held a public consultation regarding the proposed Dimona–Eilat section, which would accommodate both passenger and freight services. The project remains under planning, with no confirmed opening date.

In May 2017, an extension of the railway from Arad via Kuseife was approved. The line would connect to the existing Beersheba–Dimona rail line at the proposed new station at Nevatim.

== Rolling stock ==
Israel Railways currently owns a total of 193 locomotives, 717 passenger cars, and 110 MU trainsets.

=== Current ===
==== Locomotives ====
Class	Image	Type	Top speed		Number	Remarks	Built	Entered service
Class	Image	Type	mph	km/h	Number	Remarks	Built	Entered service
EMD G12		Diesel-Electric locomotive			10	Bo-Bo. Israel imported 23 from EMD 1954–62 and captured four more from Egyptian National Railways in the 1967 Six-Day War. Some have been withdrawn and one (No. 107) is now in the Israel Railway Museum in Haifa. No. 106 was withdrawn after sabotage. Nos. 119 & 123 withdrawn after incidents. No. 130 never in service due to Six-Day War.	1954–62	1961
EMD G26		Diesel-Electric locomotive			14		1971–82	1971
EMD GT26CW-2		Diesel-Electric locomotive			13	Number 701 is an original EMD unit delivered in 1989. In the mid-2010s Israel Railways purchased thirteen units from NRE which were completely rebuilt by TŽV Gredelj from 11 Croatian Railways HŽ series 2063 GT26 units plus 2 new frames and designated as NGT26CW-3 variants. They were delivered to Israel Railways between August 2015 and December 2017 and numbered 710–722.	1989, 2015–17	2015
Alstom Prima JT 42CW		Diesel-Electric locomotive	68	110	7	Series 702–709. EMD prime mover.	1996	1997
Alstom Prima JT 42BW		Diesel-Electric locomotive	87	140	48	Series 731–778. EMD prime mover.	1996–2006	1997
Vossloh Euro 3200		Diesel-Electric locomotive	100	160	24	Series 1301–1324. With modifications capable of 200 km/h. EMD prime mover.	2011–13	2015
Vossloh Euro 4000		Diesel-Electric locomotive	80	130	14	Series 1401–1414. EMD prime mover.	2011	2014
Bombardier TRAXX P160 AC3		Electric locomotive	100	160	63 (32 options)	Ordered in 2015. 25 kV 50 Hz AC operation. 6 MW electric output. Initial delivery began in 2017.	2017	2018

==== Multiple units ====
Class	Image	Type	Top speed		Number	Remarks	Built
Class	Image	Type	mph	km/h	Number	Remarks	Built
Siemens Desiro HC		EMU	100	160	~60 sets (330 cars)	Siemens won tender in September 2017. Tender called for two basic double-deck sets: 15 short (composed of 4 cars) and 45 long (6 cars). First delivery, consisting of three sets, took place in November 2020.	2019

==== Carriages ====
Israel Railways owns a total of 717 passenger cars.

Class	Image	Type	Top speed		Number	Remarks	Built
Class	Image	Type	mph	km/h	Number	Remarks	Built
Bombardier Double-deck Coach		double deck push-pull (DDPP)	100	160	24	Driving- and generator trailer (PC-103) series 401–424. Two trailers out of operation	2001–04
Bombardier Double-deck Coach		double deck push-pull (DDPP)	100	160	68	Coaches (TC-101) series 425–490. Four trailers out of operation	2001–04
Bombardier Double-deck Coach		double deck push-pull (DDPP)	100	160	7	Driving- and generator trailer (PC-103) series 501–507.	2005–06
Bombardier Double-deck Coach		double deck push-pull (DDPP)	100	160	18	Coaches (TC-101) series 521–538.	2005–06
Bombardier Double-deck Coach		double deck push-pull (DDPP)	100	160	82	Coaches (TC-101) series 2201–2394.	2005–06
Siemens Viaggio Light		single deck push-pull	100	160	87	Three types: standard coach (901-953), standard coach with wheelchair accessible toilets (825-849) and DVT with diesel generator (801-814). First stock in service on 8 March 2009	2008
Siemens Viaggio Light		single deck push-pull	100	160	31	Three types: standard coach (901-953), standard coach with wheelchair accessible toilets (825-849) and DVT with diesel generator (801-814). First stock in service on 8 March 2009	2011
Bombardier Double-deck Coach		double deck push-pull	100	160	78	Further coaches were ordered from Bombardier in 2010.	2011
Bombardier Double-deck Coach		double deck push-pull	100	160	72	Ordered in 2012 and delivered from the end of March 2014. Similar in overall appearance to previous DDPP sets but capable of higher speeds and advanced safety measures (although previous Bombardier DDPP sets were later upgraded to these standards). First rolling stock capable of operating on Israel Railways' 25 kV 50 Hz electrified lines.	2014
Bombardier Double-deck Coach		double deck push-pull	100	160	93	Twindexx. Similar in overall appearance to previous DDPP sets. Sixty Ordered in 2016 and a further 33 in mid-2017.	2018
Bombardier Double-deck Coach		double deck push-pull	100	160	48	Twindexx. Similar in overall appearance to previous DDPP sets. Electric operation only (no diesel generator installed in control car). Ordered in late 2017.	2019
Bombardier Double-deck Coach		double deck push-pull	100	160	74	Twindexx. Similar in overall appearance to previous DDPP sets. Ordered in May 2019.	2020

=== Retired ===
==== Locomotives ====
===== Steam locomotives =====
Class	Image	Top speed		Number	Remarks	Built
Class	Image	mph	km/h	Number	Remarks	Built
Baldwin H class				6	Series 7-12 (H2), 13-17 (H3), 33 of series 871–920. Taken over from Palestine Railways. Last went out of service in 1959 and scrapped in '60.	1918
NBL/Borsig Egyptian 545 class				4	5 captured during 1956 Israeli invasion of Sinai on the former Palestine Railways main line between El Kantara East and Gaza: numbers 546, 550 and 557 (NBL) and numbers 607 and 613 (Borsig). 4 taken into stock and used them around Lod in central Israel for 1–2 years. Withdrawn and scrapped in 1959.	1928, 1931
NBL P class 4-6-0				6	Series 60–65. Taken over from Palestine Railways. Last went out of service in 1959 and scrapped in '60. Tender of 62 preserved at Israel Railway Museum.	1935
LMS Stanier Class 8F				23	Series around 70513. Taken over from Palestine Railways. Last went out of service in 1958. One (the 24th) stranded 8F, 70372 (NBL works no. 24680), on a small section of the main line near Tulkarm on the West Bank side of the 1949 Armistice line.It remained there, increasingly derelict, until after the 1967 Israeli 6 day war. The Israelis finally removed and scrapped it in about 1973. A similar 8F (a Turkish TCDD 45151 Class locomotive) preserved at Be'er Sheva Turkish railway station and numbered 70414.	1935–46
USATC S100 Class				2	Number 21 &22 (class 957?). Transported from Europe to Suez in September 1942. To Palestine Railways, later Army. Later to Israel Railways. 1	1942

===== Diesel locomotives =====
Class	Image	Top speed		Number	Remarks	Built
Class	Image	mph	km/h	Number	Remarks	Built
SAFB (GM-EMD)		68	110	3	BoBo locomotives series 101-103, fitted with EMD 3RSW engines. In service until 1998. First diesel locomotive in IR's service. 102 locomotive is preserved.	1952
Esslingen				18	Series 211–228. Similar to DB Class V 60. In the mid-1960s, the Esslingen factory was closed. As a result, some almost-new locomotives were cannibalised for parts. One example preserved at the Railway Museum and another at the Jezreel Valley railway heritage site in Elro'i.	1955–56
Deutz				3	Series 201-203 shunting locomotives. 203 is preserved under the 201 number	1958
EMD G16				3	Co-Co. During the Six-Day War Israel captured Egyptian Railways 3304, 3329 and 3361 which were appropriated into Israel Railways stock as numbers 301–303, later 161–163. All have now been withdrawn from service but 163 (formerly ER 3361) is preserved at the Israel Railway Museum.	1960–61
GA DE900		50	80	3	Series 261–263. Primarily used for shunting. Withdrawn from service in the early 2020s. One placed on static display near the historic Petah Tikva railway station.	1997

==== Multiple units ====
Class	Image	Type	Top speed		Number	Remarks	Built
Class	Image	Type	mph	km/h	Number	Remarks	Built
Esslingen		DMU			12	Similar to German VT08. 3-car sets (powered coaches 1-12, intermediate coaches 1-12, driving coaches 1-12), some later extended to 4-unit sets (with intermediate coaches 13-22). In the early sixties converted to non-powered coaches in push-pull service because of high maintenance costs. Withdrawn in 1979. Some carriages continued in regular services from 1992 until nineties as 111–117. One trailer should be preserved by the Country Museum in Tel Aviv	1956
FIAT 7225		Railcar	80	128	0	10 ordered. After 8 were finished, the order was cancelled for unclear reasons. Italian literature wrote because of the Yom Kippur War. All ten units were sold to Ferrocarril del Pacifico and Ferrocarril Chihuahua al Pacífico in Mexico, where they entered service in 1975.	1970/1973
ABB Scandia IC3		DMU	112	180	9 sets (42-50)	The introduction of IC3-trains in the early 1990s marked the beginning of a political recommitment to major improvements in the services of Israel Railways. Each IC3 set is composed of 3 cars and multiple sets may be joined together. Sets 42-50 purchased from SJ in 2005. 31 was scrapped after an incident near Revadim on 10 August 2006. 19, 21, 25 possibly out of service. 01 is now in the Israel Railway Museum.	1990
ABB Scandia IC3		DMU	100	160	10 sets (01-10)	The introduction of IC3-trains in the early 1990s marked the beginning of a political recommitment to major improvements in the services of Israel Railways. Each IC3 set is composed of 3 cars and multiple sets may be joined together. Sets 42-50 purchased from SJ in 2005. 31 was scrapped after an incident near Revadim on 10 August 2006. 19, 21, 25 possibly out of service. 01 is now in the Israel Railway Museum.	1992
ABB Scandia IC3		DMU	100	160	31 sets (11-41)	The introduction of IC3-trains in the early 1990s marked the beginning of a political recommitment to major improvements in the services of Israel Railways. Each IC3 set is composed of 3 cars and multiple sets may be joined together. Sets 42-50 purchased from SJ in 2005. 31 was scrapped after an incident near Revadim on 10 August 2006. 19, 21, 25 possibly out of service. 01 is now in the Israel Railway Museum.	1994–96

==== Carriages ====
Class	Image	Number	Remarks	Built
O&K		8	3rd class coaches similar to German Eilzugwagen series 51-58. Seating however different with 2+3 seat arrangement and 96 seats.	1955
Carel et Fouché CarF		14	Picture: first carriage. Series 71-84	1961
Boris Kidrič/Metalka "Yugo"		43	Series 601–643, delivered in several batches between 1964 and 1972. 601-615 in 1964, series 616-625 in 1965, 626-633 in 1966, 634-637 in 1971 and 638-643 in 1972. Coaches 631, 632 and 633 were fitted with buffets. 610 converted to half passenger carriage, half generator car. Some other were converted to full generator carriages. 621 in 2009 used as office in red colors in Bnei Brak.	1964–72
DEV-Inox Carel et Fouché		8	Bought from SNCF in 1994 (Series 91-98) to create superfuous coaches for refurbishment by HaArgaz. Original 1st class A9TJ-mainline carriage U64. Declassified to B10 1/2TJ in eighties. Scrapped in 2006. 1 preserved in Railway Museum.	1965
British Railways Mark 2c TSO		8 (13)	Bought from British Rail in 1977 (Series 681-688 (ex BR 5567, 5570, 5575, 5580, 5588, 5593, 5606, 5612) and retro-fitted with air conditioning equipment at Wolverton Works. 1 preserved at Railway Museum. In 1989, restaurant chain Apropo bought 5 Mk1 (BR 3947, 7675, 18768, 84338) and 1 Mk2 (5250) and shipped these to Israel, never to be used.	1970
Alstom Modo		35	Assembled in Israel by Haargaz and were the first push-pull carriages operated by Israel railways. In August 2022 Israel Railways announced they were pulling the Alstom Modo from service starting September 2022. Driving Coach 302 is preserved on display at Railway Museum.	1996-1997

== Organizational structure ==
The company is headed by a chief executive officer. It has two subsidiaries: a real estate development company, and a freight rail company. The main organization has five operational departments: freight, infrastructure, rolling stock, passengers and development.

In 2017, Israel Railways founded a Tunnels Unit that is responsible for the daily operation of railway tunnels, including lighting, air circulation, etc. and managing emergencies.

== Performance ==
View chart definition.

The passenger number history (in millions) is as follows:

Ridership of Israel Railways
Year	Ridership (millions)
1950	1.6
1960	4.4
1970	4.1
1980	3.3
1990	2.5
1991	2.9
1995	4.8
1996	5.1
1997	5.6
1998	6.4
1999	8.8
2000	12.7
2001	15.1
2002	17.5
2003	19.8
2004	22.9
2005	26.8
2006	28.4
2007	31.8
2008	35.1
2009	35.9
2010	35.9
2011	35.9
2012	40.4
2013	45
2014	48.5
2015	53
2016	59.5
2017	64.6
2018	67.7
2019	69
2020	24.2
2021	35.0
2022	54.7
2023	62.5
2024	65.4
2025	71.8

Additional statistics
	1990	1995	2000	2010	2015	2016	2017	2018	2019	2020	2021	2022	2023	2024	2025
Total Revenue (million NIS)^{a}	102	200	402	840	1,158	1,102	1,159	1,155	1,146	518	599	604	598	566	608
Passenger-kilometers (million)	170	267	781	1,986	2,608	2,645	2,765	3,032	3,580	1,253	1,956	3,019	3,401	3,588	4,000
Train-kilometers (passenger, million)			3.812	8.905	12.101	12.92	13.767	14.137	14.796	10.158				14.429	14.672
Train-kilometers (cargo, thousand)			1,498	1,609	1,817	2,063	2,141	1,934	1,934	1,791				1,262	1,441
Ton-kilometers (cargo, million)	1,048	1,176	1,173	1,062	1,155	1,404	1,381	1,235	1,241	1,250	1,085	992	895	906	963
Network length (km)	940	858	926	1,035	1,277	1,337	1,384	1,462	1,462	1,486				1,464	1,541

^a In contemporary shekels – not adjusted for inflation

== Notable accidents ==
- On 26 December 1963 two passenger trains on the then single-track main line linking Tel Aviv and Haifa collided head-on at Bet Yehoshua just south of Netanya. The northbound train had passed a red signal and its locomotive rode over and crushed the locomotive of the southbound train. None of the coaches was derailed but a coupler broke in the northbound train detaching the rear three coaches. The continuous train brake should have then automatically stopped the detached coaches but it had not been connected properly so they started to roll back southwards. 55 people were injured but only three seriously enough to be detained in hospital. The two head-end crews survived but their locomotives, EMD G12s 105 and 118, were destroyed.
- HaBonim disaster: On 11 June 1985 a train collided with a bus carrying school children, killing 19 children and 3 adults, near moshav HaBonim.
- On 21 June 2005 an IC3 train crashed into a freight truck near kibbutz Revadim, killing 8 and injuring 198.
- 8 July 2005, a train collided with a truck between Kiryat Gat and Ahuzam, resulting in the death of the train driver and 38 injuries. In February 2012 a plea bargain had been set for the Revadim crash.
- On 12 June 2006 a train crashed into a truck near Beit Yehoshua, killing 5 and injuring from 77 to over 80.
- On 27 December 2009 a train crashed into a car near Kiryat Gat. The driver proceeded without regard to the train checkpoint on the road. The train struck his car and he was killed.
- On 5 August 2010 a train crashed into a minibus near Kiryat Gat, killing 7 and injuring 6. The minibus was hit at 19:05 GMT+3 on Route 353, apparently as it tried to pass over a level crossing.
- On 28 December 2010 a fire started in a train near kibbutz Yakum, probably because of a short circuit, injuring 116.
- On 7 April 2011 two trains collided frontally near Netanya, injuring 59.
- On 4 October 2013, two men walking along railroad tracks in the Emek Hefer valley industrial zone were killed by a train.
- On 18 December 2013, a Beersheba-bound train collided with a group of camels walking along railroad tracks at the Segev Shalom Junction in the Negev, killing 14 camels. The incident caused massive delays in train traffic.
- On 29 December 2013, an Israel Railways worker was run down and killed by a train near Lod.
- On 15 March 2016, an Israel Railways locomotive crashed into freight wagons, injuring 6.

== See also ==
- Rail transport in Israel
- Hejaz Railway (1908-1920), Ottoman line which connected Damascus with Medina; the Jezreel Valley railway was a branch in its network

Ottoman Palestine railways

- Eastern Railway, Ottoman WWI line, Tulkarm to Hadera and Tulkarm to Lydda; connected to Jezreel Valley, Jaffa–Jerusalem, and Beersheba lines
- Jaffa–Jerusalem railway (inaugurated 1892)
- Jezreel Valley railway (1905-1948), segment of the Haifa–Dera'a Line which connected the Hejaz Railway to the port of Haifa
- Railway to Beersheba or the 'Egyptian Branch', Ottoman WWI line headed towards the Suez Canal; two lines: (Lidda–) Wadi Surar (Nahal Soreq)–Beit Hanoun, and Wadi Surar–Beersheba

Mandate Palestine & Israel railways

- Palestine Railways, government-owned company and rail monopolist in Mandate Palestine (1920-1948)
- Coastal railway line, main line in Mandate Palestine and Israel

== Bibliography ==
- Cotterell, Paul (1986). The Railways of Palestine and Israel. Tourret Publishing. ISBN 0-905878-04-3.
