= Dimona railway station =

Railway station in Israel

Dimona דימונה
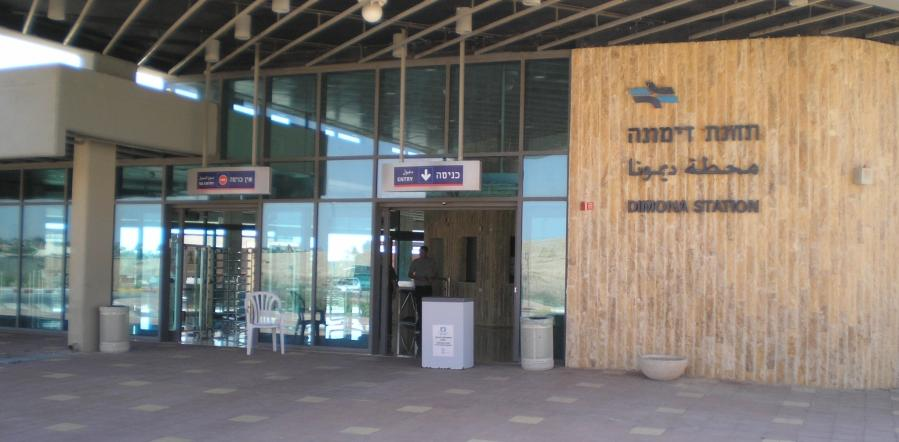

General information
- Coordinates: 31.070028°N 35.01066°E

History
- Opened: December 17, 2005

Passengers
- 2019: 14,745
- Rank: 68 out of 68
Location

Dimona railway station (Hebrew: תחנת הרכבת דימונה, Takhanat HaRakevet Dimona) is a train station in Dimona, Israel, opened in 2005.

It is on a 35-kilometre-long (22 mi) line between Dimona and Beersheba, a separate operating line within Israel Railways. The track carries on beyond the actual town itself to mines and freight yards.

Partly due to the station's distance from central Dimona and low service frequency of at most 4 trains a day, ridership is very low. With only 14,745 passengers recorded in 2019, the station was the least used in all of Israel. However, proposals to close it on account of poor usage have been rejected in order to preserve passenger rail service to the historically deprived development town.

Preceding station	Israel Railways	Following station
Be'er Sheva–North Terminus	Beersheba–Dimona	Terminus
