= Beit Shemesh railway station =

Railway station in Israel

Coordinates: 31°45′26.77″N 34°59′27.15″E

Beit Shemesh בית שמש
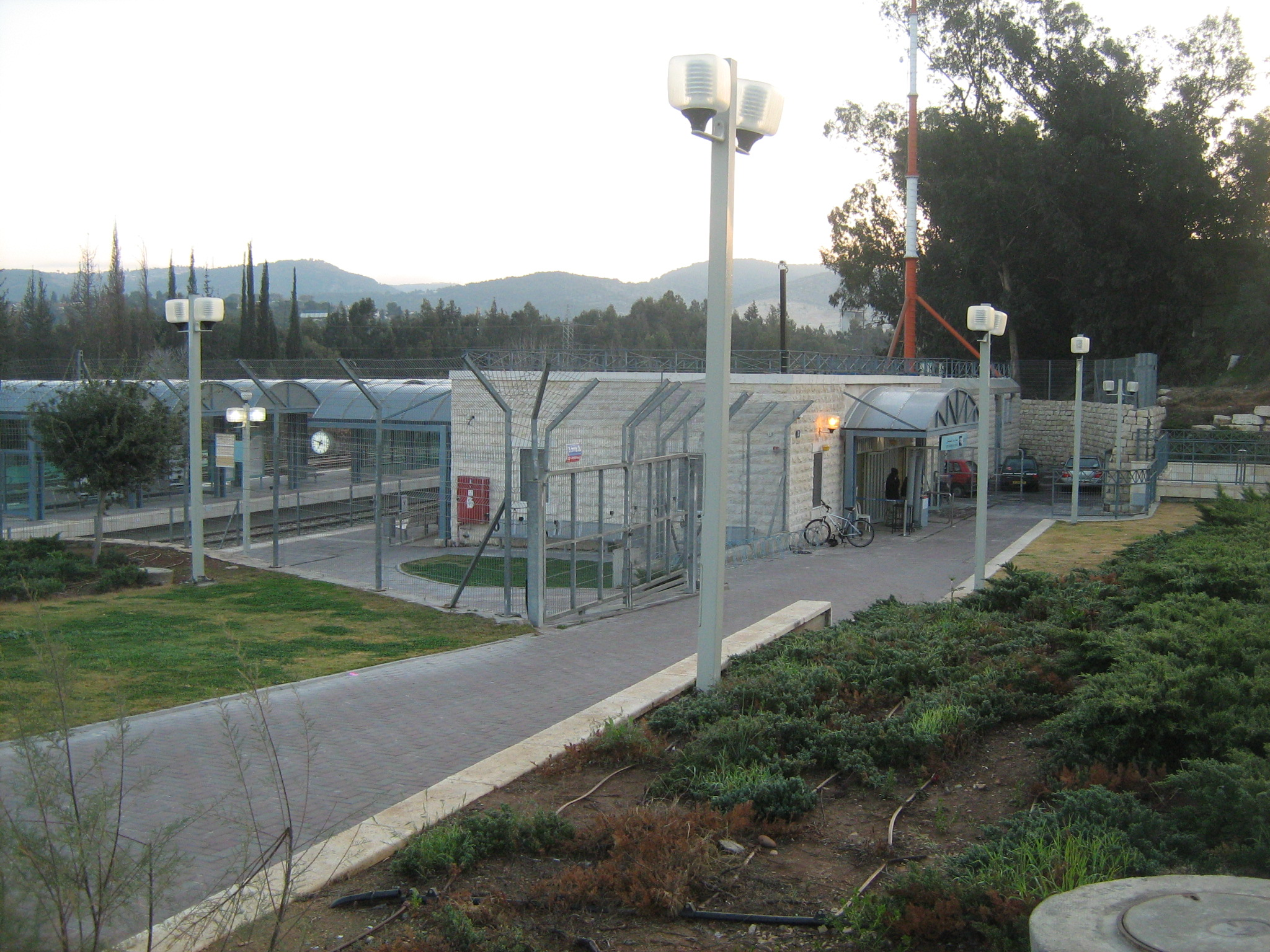
- Beit Shemesh train station building

General information
- Location: Beit Shemesh, Israel

History
- Opened: 1892
- Closed: 1998–2003
- Rebuilt: 2003
- Former names: 1892–1918: Deir Aban; 1918–1948: Artuf; 1948–1953: Har-Tuv

Passengers
- 2019: 930,014
- Rank: 40 out of 68

Services
| Preceding station | Israel Railways | Following station |
|---|---|---|
| Ramla towards Netanya | Netanya–Beit Shemesh | Terminus |
Location

Beit Shemesh railway station is an Israel Railways station in Beit Shemesh, Israel, on the Tel Aviv–Lod–Jerusalem line. The station is located near the northern industrial zone of Beit Shemesh.

== History ==
Beit Shemesh Station was built under Ottoman rule with the construction of the Jaffa-Jerusalem railway, the first rail line in Palestine. The station has been known under four different names: its original name, Dayr Aban, which was changed during the late Mandatory period to Artuf/Hartuv, the names of a nearby Arab village and a Jewish moshava, both depopulated in the 1948 Arab–Israeli War. The location of the station remained unchanged throughout this period, at a point that now lies on the northern border of the city of Beit Shemesh, near Highway 38.

The station was closed to passenger trains in July 1998 due to the poor condition of the tracks. During the upgrade of the Jerusalem line, the station was also redesigned, and the line connected to the Gush Dan train system. The upgrade of the tracks was conducted in two parts: first, which was completed on September 13, 2003, included running track to Beit Shemesh, and the second, concluded on April 9, 2005, extended the line to Jerusalem. At the end of 2006, service on the line was split in two and the Beit Shemesh station became an intermediate station for transferring between the Tel Aviv-Beit Shemesh line and the Beit Shemesh-Jerusalem line. The split line was cancelled on 2014, though the line was later re-split in 2017.

Due to the COVID-19 pandemic and the ensuing shutdown of train services, only the Tel Aviv-Beit Shemesh portion of the line was reinstated when train operations were resumed. Train services to Jerusalem are now handled only by the electrified Tel Aviv–Jerusalem railway.

== Line split ==
When the line to Jerusalem was completed on April 9, 2005, rail service on the Tel Aviv-Beit Shemesh line was on IC3 trains only, because this was the type of train with the smallest distance between the bogies. Following numerous cracks in the bogies as a result of the winding track and steep slope and the high cost of operation arising from repair of the bogies, it was decided to use only two IC3 systems on the track to Jerusalem. In 2006, the track was split into two for a trial period: Tel Aviv-Beit Shemesh and Beit Shemesh-Jerusalem. Following the split it was attempted to operate double-decker passenger cars until Beit Shemesh, and IC3 systems until Jerusalem. Due to the prolonged wait times in Beit Shemesh—45 minutes in the direction of Tel Aviv and 15 minutes in the direction of Jerusalem—there was a significant decline in the number of rail passengers to and from Jerusalem.

In 2007, it was decided to move the Tel Aviv-Beit Shemesh transfer to Nahal Sorek, instead of the transfer at Na'an. As a result, travel time was lengthened by three minutes for trains travelling on the line in all directions, but the waiting time for the train change to and from Jerusalem was reduced to five minutes. With the reduction of travel times, the number of passengers gradually began to rise. The line split was cancelled on March 15, 2008.

In 2017 the line split was reinstated with waiting times of between 5 and 31 minutes. A few trains per day ran direct.

In 2021, Israel Railways announced the retirement of its IC3 trains as the new Siemens Desiro electric multiple units were introduced; the IC3 trains were withdrawn from timetabled services in November 2023 but retained as backup, and completely retired on 28 January 2024. This has rendered the rail section between Beit Shemesh and Jerusalem inoperative until either a replacement train is found, or the line undergoes a massive renovation.

== Structure of the station ==
The station includes a large passenger hall, an underground crossing between tracks, a side platform, and an island platform.

== Train service ==
From Sunday to Thursday, a train leaves the station every hour to Tel Aviv.

On Fridays and holiday eves, trains leave the station every hour to Tel Aviv.

On Saturday Nights and the night after holidays, a single train leaves the station in the direction of Tel Aviv.
