= Be'er Sheva–Center railway station =

Railway station in Beersheba, Israel

Coordinates: 31.243288°N 34.798443°E

Be'er Sheva–Center באר שבע – מרכז
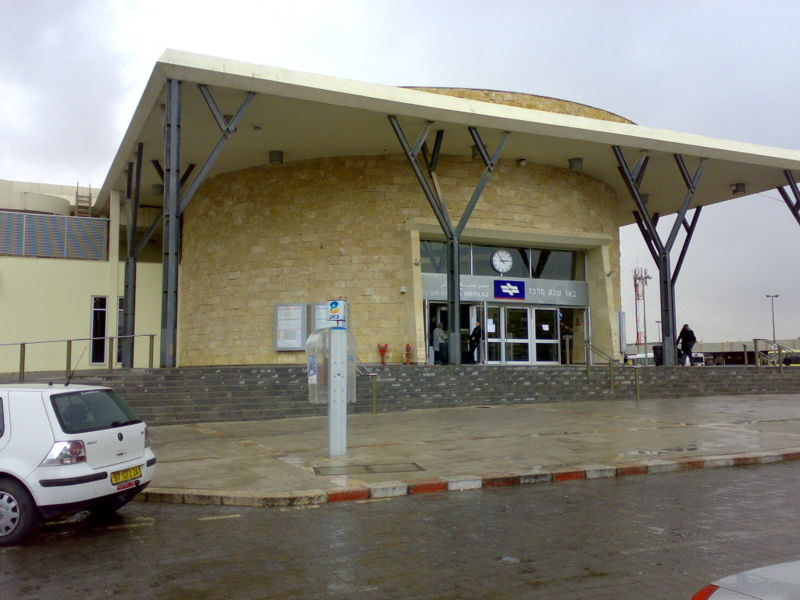
- Be'er Sheva Merkaz station entrance

General information
- Location: 8 Yitzhak Ben-Zvi Street, Beersheba
- Lines: Nahariya-Haifa-Tel Aviv-Lod-Beersheba; Rosh HaAyin-Tel Aviv-Rishon LeZion-Ashkelon-Beersheba
- Platforms: 5
- Tracks: 4

Construction
- Parking: 300
- Accessible: yes

History
- Opened: September 20, 2000; 25 years ago
- Electrified: 27 March 2026; 4 months ago

Passengers
- 2019: 3,562,792
- Rank: 10 out of 68
Location

Be'er Sheva–Center railway station is an Israel Railways terminal in Beersheba. It is located on Yitzhak Ben-Zvi street next to the city's central bus station and HaNegev Mall. It is one of two railway stations serving the city, the other being Be'er Sheva–North, located near the Ben-Gurion University of the Negev.

== Design ==
The station building is located at the north end of the platforms. As of 2021, the station consists of three platforms (two side platforms and an island platform) serving a total of four tracks. Construction is expected to be completed in 2022, converting the eastern side platform into an island platform to serve a fifth track at the station. The works will also add an additional public entrance to the station from the southeast.

Space also exists to add an additional passenger platform on the western side of the station in the future.

== Services ==
As of the Fall 2015 schedule, there are three trains per hour in each direction between Be'er Sheva Center and central Israel during most hours of the day. Two of these trains use the Railway to Beersheba with a travel time of between 1hr 5mins and 1hr 15mins (depending on the stops along the route) to Tel Aviv HaHagana Railway Station, with some continuing as far north as Nahariya. The other train serving the station uses the Ashkelon–Beersheba railway and the Coastal railway with a travel time between 1hr 30mins and 1hr 45mins to Tel Aviv HaHagana via Ashkelon and Rishon LeZion. These trains then terminate in Hod HaSharon.

== See also ==
- Beersheba Turkish Railway Station

Preceding station	Israel Railways	Following station
Be'er Sheva–North towards Nahariya	Nahariya–Beersheba	Terminus
Be'er Sheva–North towards Karmiel	Karmiel–Beersheba	Terminus
Be'er Sheva–North towards Binyamina	Binyamina–Beersheba	Terminus
Be'er Sheva–North towards Ashkelon	Ashkelon–Beersheba	Terminus
