= Tel Aviv–Jerusalem railway =

Railway line in Israel

Coordinates: 31.850440°N 35.002388°E

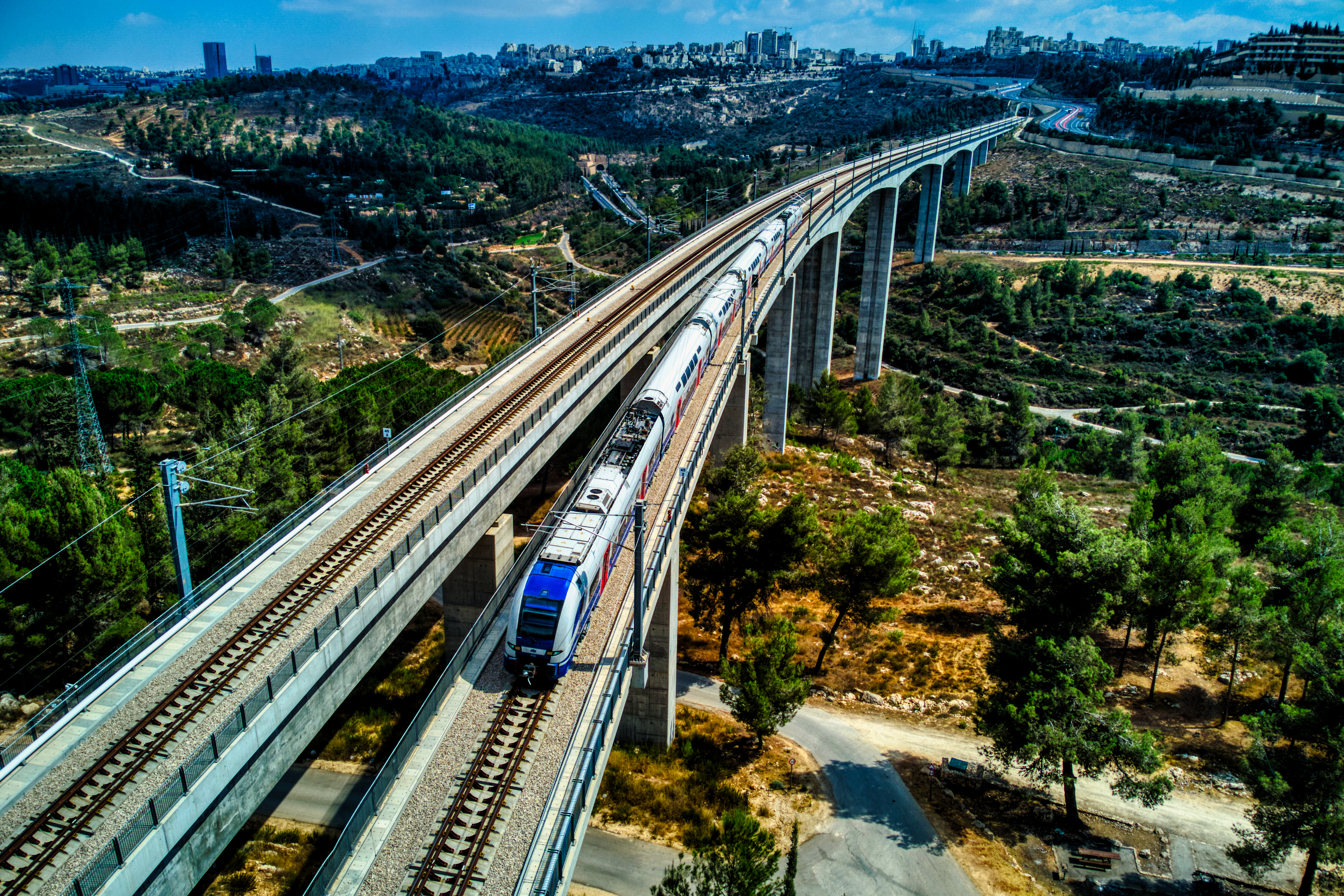

Service
- Operator: Israel Railways

History
- Opened: 25 September 2018

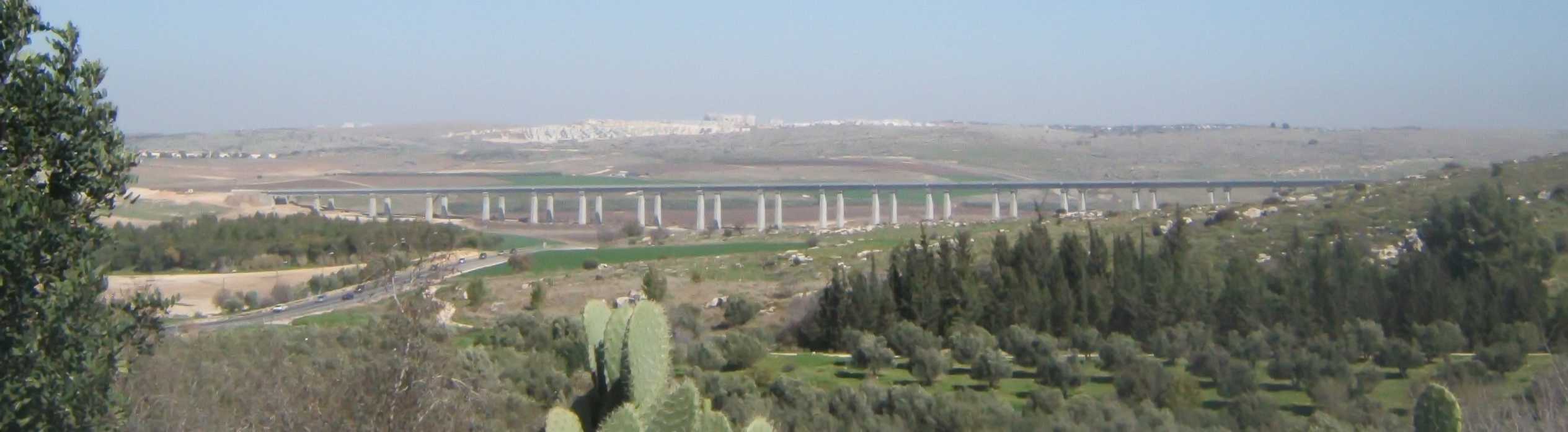
The viaduct over the Valley of Ayalon, one of the most recognisable landmarks of the project

External videos
- Jerusalem to Tel Aviv (YouTube) – Train driver's view of the journey from Navon station to HaHagana Station
- Tel Aviv to Jerusalem (YouTube) – Train driver's view of the journey from HaHagana Station to Navon station

The Tel Aviv–Jerusalem railway is a railway line in Israel connecting the cities of Tel Aviv and Jerusalem. It serves as the main rail link between the two cities, complementing the old Jaffa–Jerusalem railway. As such, the railway is often referred to in Israel as the high-speed railway to Jerusalem to distinguish it from the older, longer and slower line. In spite of that name, the line is not high-speed under the definition used by the International Union of Railways: both its design speed of 200 km/h (125 mph) and its current operational speed of 160 km/h (99 mph) are below the 250 km/h (155 mph) threshold used by the UIC to define high-speed railways, and it is traversed by IR's regular rolling stock (Note: While initially, the Tel Aviv-Jerusalem line was the only one operated by electric locomotives in Israel, they are being gradually introduced in the rest of the system as electrification progresses. As of 2025, electric trains are also run on the Binaymina-Ashkelon and Ashkelon-Herzliya lines, as well as the Jerusalem-Modi'in spur of the Tel Aviv-Jerusalem line.) instead of the UIC requirement for specially designed high-speed trains.

The newly constructed railway section to Jerusalem branches off from the Tel Aviv–Lod railway at the Ganot Interchange southeast of Tel Aviv and spans about 56 km (35 mi) of electrified double track. It cost approximately NIS 7 billion (about US$2 billion in 2008 dollars) – due to the extensive bridging and tunneling required along the mountainous route. Besides the construction of the new railway section, the existing railway from Herzliya to Ganot Interchange underwent electrification. The railway's design speed is 160 km/h (99 mph) with a projected non-stop travel time of approximately 28 minutes from Tel Aviv HaHagana railway station to Jerusalem–Yitzhak Navon railway station. As of 2019, the scheduled travel time between Ben Gurion Airport railway station and Jerusalem is 22–26 minutes, and between Tel Aviv HaHagana and Jerusalem 32–34 minutes (including the stop at Ben Gurion Airport). This compared with about 75 minutes each way using the Jaffa–Jerusalem railway from Tel Aviv HaHagana to southern Jerusalem's Malha station, which unlike Jerusalem–Navon, is located relatively far from the city center.

Construction of the railway began in 2001. It was the first heavy rail line in Israel to be electrified and was originally planned to open in 2008, but various objections, bureaucratic delays and engineering difficulties caused planning and construction to span over two decades, with the line opening for service in stages. The first section, between the Ganot interchange on Highway 1 and Ben Gurion Airport opened in October 2004 and made train travel possible between Tel Aviv and the airport. Another section completed in 2007 is used by trains operating between central Israel and Modi'in. The final section opened on 25 September 2018 and enabled service between Jerusalem–Navon and Ben Gurion Airport. As electrification works progressed northwards from the airport through Tel Aviv to Herzliya, service to and from Jerusalem was extended to include additional stations, beginning with Tel Aviv HaHagana on 21 December 2019, Tel Aviv HaShalom and Savidor Central on 30 June 2020, and Tel Aviv University and Herzliya on 21 September 2020. With the completion of electrification works to Binyamina in February 2023, nighttime-only service was extended from Hertzliya to Netanya, Hadera West And Binyamina. A railway spur which opened on 31 March 2022 also enables direct service on the line between Jerusalem and Modi'in.

Eventually, trains from Jerusalem are expected to continue all the way to northern Israel as future phases of Israel Railways' electrification project are carried out along the Coastal Railway, with the long-term plan of trains originating from Jerusalem terminating at Karmiel by the mid 2020s.

== Planning ==
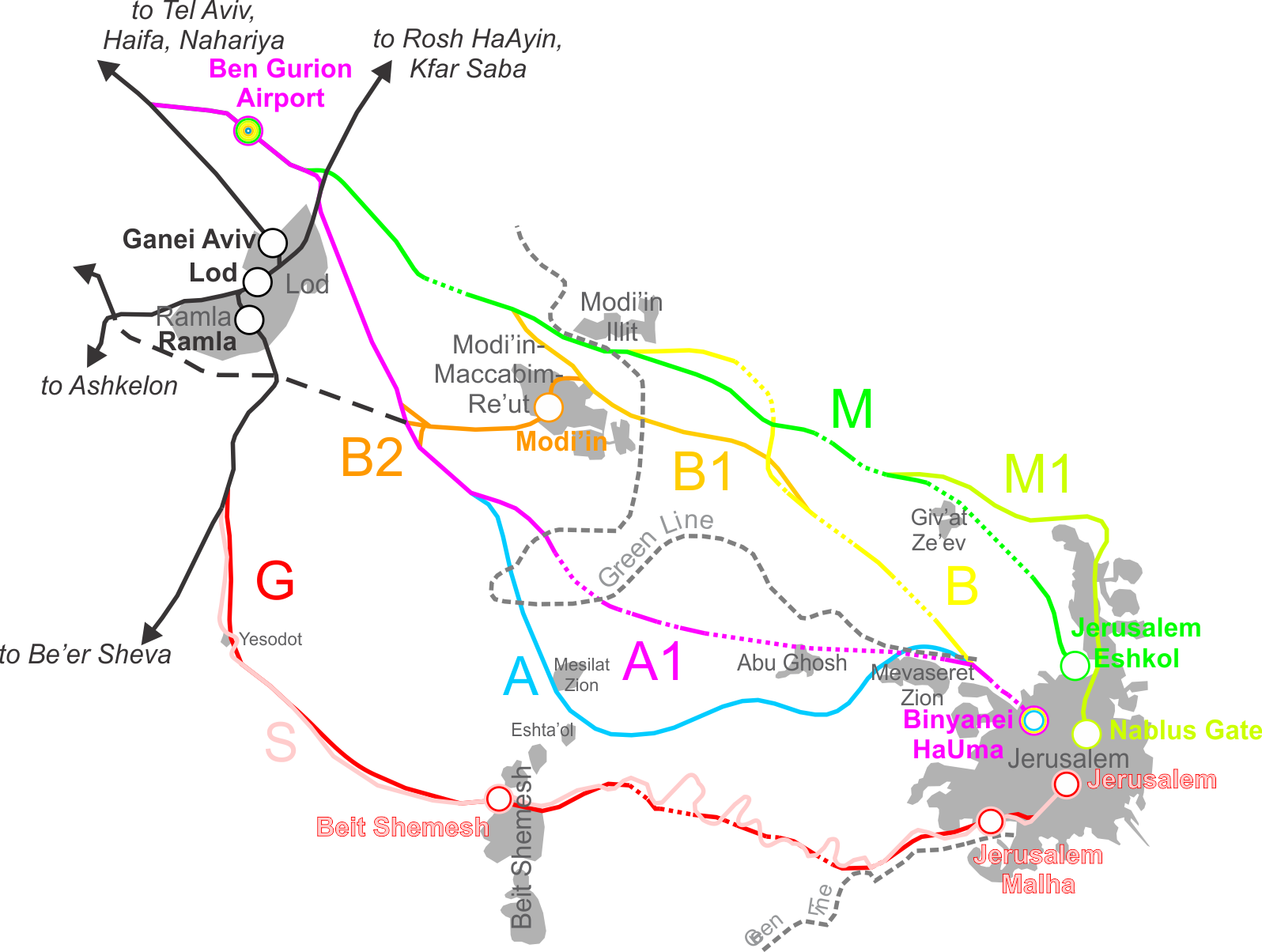
Map of the selected routes (S and A1) and other proposed routes under consideration, with dots indicating tunnels

After the suspension of service from Tel Aviv to Jerusalem on the old Jaffa–Jerusalem line in 1998 due to the poor track state, an urgent need arose to create a rail link from Tel Aviv to Jerusalem. Between 2000 and 2001, several alternatives were proposed:

- Plans S and S1 – minor repairs of the old single-track route (S), or one that also includes a few short tunnels and curve straightening (S1).
- Plans G and G1 – a massive repair of the old route, straightening all the curves by excavating numerous long tunnels along the route: 4–6 km (2.5–3.7 mi) of tunnels in G and 16 km (9.9 mi) in G1. G1 was meant to continue into central Jerusalem and terminate in an underground station at Independence Park.
- Plans B, B1, B2, M and M1 – construction of a new line from Tel Aviv to Jerusalem via Modi'in-Maccabim-Re'ut within or near Road 443.
- Plans A and A1 – construction of a new line between the cities nearby Highway 1, with a branch to Modi'in. These plans were recommended by the bodies that originally published them (A in 1994 and A1 in 1997 and 2000). Compared to alternative A, A1 included a considerable amount of tunneling in order to obtain a more direct route through the mountains.

Plans to build a line adjacent to Road 443 were discarded immediately, due to its being inside the West Bank. The Municipality of Jerusalem supported Plan G1, while Israel Railways supported Plan S as a quick deployment plan, followed by A1. On June 13, 2001, Transportation Minister Ephraim Sneh and Prime Minister Ariel Sharon chose to proceed with Israel Railways' plan. One of the reasons was environmentalists' opposition to G1, due to the route passing through the middle of a nature reserve. Plan B2 was used for the branch to Modi'in, which was completed in 2008. This section of railway is part of the Rishon LeZion–Modi'in railway, a longer future line that will extend from Modi'in to Rishon LeZion along right-of-way reserved for it during the construction of Highway 431. As part of the implementation of plan S, the old line's reach into Jerusalem was shortened at the request of the Jerusalem municipality. Instead of terminating at the Jerusalem Railway Station, the renovated line terminated at the new Malha Station in southern Jerusalem.

Following plan S rehabilitation, trains using the Jaffa–Jerusalem railway reached southern Jerusalem in about 75 minutes from Tel Aviv. This relatively long travel time, the non-central location of Malha station, and the low capacity of the line due to its eastern section consisting of only single-track meant that it continued to be one of the least-used lines in Israel Railways' network, despite connecting two large metropolises. In contrast, the travel time from Tel Aviv to central Jerusalem using the A1 route is approximately 30 minutes, and enables a high frequency of trains to operate along the route; when the A1 route opened in 2018, it quickly became the most heavily-used line in the network.

== Construction ==
Construction began in 2001 and was divided into multiple sections:

- Tel Aviv – Ben Gurion Airport (western part of Railway 27) – the line begins approximately 6 km (3.7 mi) southeast of Tel Aviv's HaHagana Railway Station, where it branches off from the Tel Aviv – Lod railway through a tunnel under the northern set of lanes of Highway 1 and the northern set of tracks of the Tel Aviv – Lod railway, at a point located between the Ganot and Shafirim interchanges, and from there connects to Ben Gurion's Terminal 3. Construction was completed in 2004 and regular service to the airport started in October of that year.
- Ben Gurion Airport – Kfar Daniel (eastern part of Railway 27) – from terminal 3 the line continues to the southeast, passing over a 550 m bridge over Highway 1, then crosses over Highway 40 and the Eastern Railway, proceeds to another bridge over Highway 443 and continues towards the Anava Interchange where it branches off towards the new Modi'in Center Railway Station through a series of bridges and tunnels. The line also connects with the Eastern Railway near the Lod Interchange providing a connection between the airport and the Lod Railway Station to the south. Construction started in 2004 and ended in 2007, with service to Paatei Modi'in Station starting in September 2007.
- Kfar Daniel – Latrun (Section A) – this section was built by Danya Cebus and was completed in 2011, at a cost of NIS 250 million. It includes a prominent 1.2 km (0.75 mi) bridge over the Ayalon Valley that was completed in 2008 and which is often claimed as the "longest railway bridge in Israel". However, this assertion is incorrect since the bridge supporting the elevated railway approaching HaMifrats Central railway station and its platforms on the Jezreel Valley railway in northern Israel that opened in 2016 is almost twice as long.
- Latrun – Sha'ar HaGai (Section B) – includes a 3.5 km (2.2 mi) tunnel under Canada Park, the tender for which was awarded in July 2010. This section was completed in 2015 by the Israeli construction firm Minrav in association with the Russian company Moscow MetroStroy at a cost of NIS 560 million. Tunnel excavation started on February 6, 2012, with one TBM. Each TBM costs NIS 100 million (not including NIS 100 million in supplementary equipment) and weighs about 1,800 tons. It was expected to excavate 20 m each day.
- Sha'ar HaGai and Mevaseret Zion (Section C) – the tender was awarded in September 2009 and preliminary site work began November 2009 with expected overall completion in 2014–2016. The most complicated part of the project involves two bridges and several tunnels, one of which, tunnel 3, is the longest in Israel. It is composed of a pair of parallel tunnels, each 9.2 m wide and 11.6 km in length, approximately three quarters of was to be bored using two TBMs working simultaneously from the west and the remainder bored conventionally from the east. The companies that performed this work are the Israeli firm Shapir Civil & Marine Engineering Ltd. in partnership with the Italian engineering firm Impresa Pizzarotti. Conventional boring of tunnel 3 from east to west started in March 2012 while TBM excavation from west to east started in September 2012 and were completed in October 2014.
- Mevaseret Zion – Jerusalem–Yitzhak Navon Railway Station, Jerusalem (Section D) – includes two bridges, two parallel single-track tunnels 800–900 meters in length, and a 2.9 kilometre tunnel. Completion is estimated to take four years. The tender for construction was awarded in the fall of 2009 to Hofrey Hasharon Ltd. and the German holding company Max Bögl. The estimated cost is NIS 640 million, not including bridge 10, which will cost an additional NIS 150 million and will be based on the design of the Črni Kal Viaduct in Slovenia. This section is supervised by Dana Engineering.

=== Bridges and tunnels ===
Below is a breakdown of the tunnels, bridges and underpasses found along the route.

Name	Location	Intersection	Type	Length
	Shafirim Interchange	Under Route 412 and the westbound direction of Highway 1	Underpass	
	Between Hemed and Tzafria	Under Road 4404	Underpass	
Bridge 1	Ben Gurion Interchange	Above Highway 1	Bridge	550–600 m
	Between Lod Interchange and Lod Bridge Junction	Over the Eastern Railway and Highway 40	Bridge	
	East of Ginaton Junction	Over Route 443	Bridge	
	Daniel Interchange	Over Highway 6	Bridge	
Bridge 4	Near Sha'alvim	Over entrance road to Sha'alvim	Bridge	120 m
Bridge 5	Near Sha'alvim		Bridge	180 m
Bridge 6	Valley of Ajalon	Over Highway 3 and the valley	Viaduct	1,200–1,250 m (40 m tall)
Tunnel 1	Canada Park	Under the park	Tunnel (TBM)	2 × 3.5 km
Bridge 7	South of Mevo Horon		Bridge	80 m
Tunnel 2	Near Nataf		Tunnel (25% C&C, 75% NATM)	2 × 1,250 m
Bridge 8	West of Nataf	Over Yitla Stream	Bridge	150 m
Tunnel 3	Sha'ar HaGai, Abu Ghosh	Under Mount HaRu'ah, Mount HaHagana, Abu Ghosh	Tunnel (75% TBM, 25% NATM)	2 × 11.6 km
Bridge 9	Mevaseret Zion		Bridge	255 m
Tunnel 3a	Mevaseret Zion		Tunnel (NATM)	2 × 850 m
Bridge 10	Mevaseret Zion		Bridge	975 m (95 m tall)
Tunnel 4	Jerusalem—from near Ginot Saharov to Binyanei HaUma	Under Lifta	Tunnel (NATM)	2.9 km

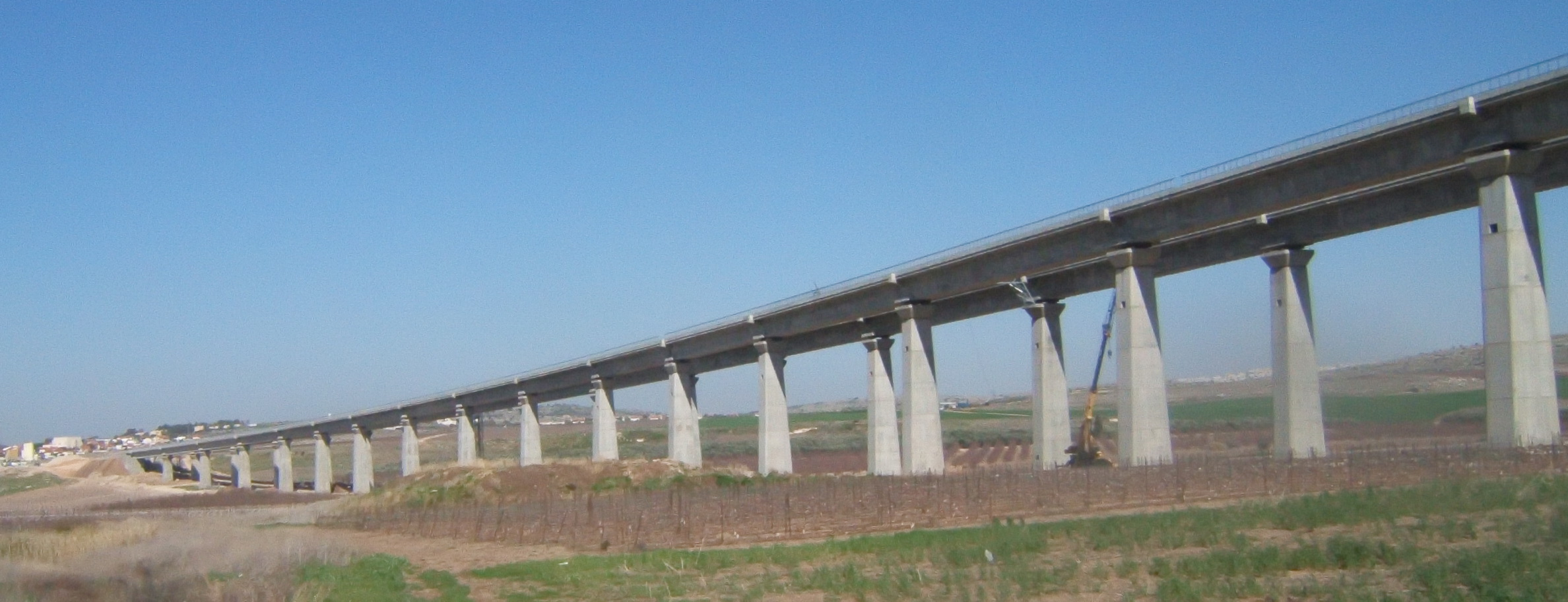
Bridge no. 6, Ayalon Valley bridge

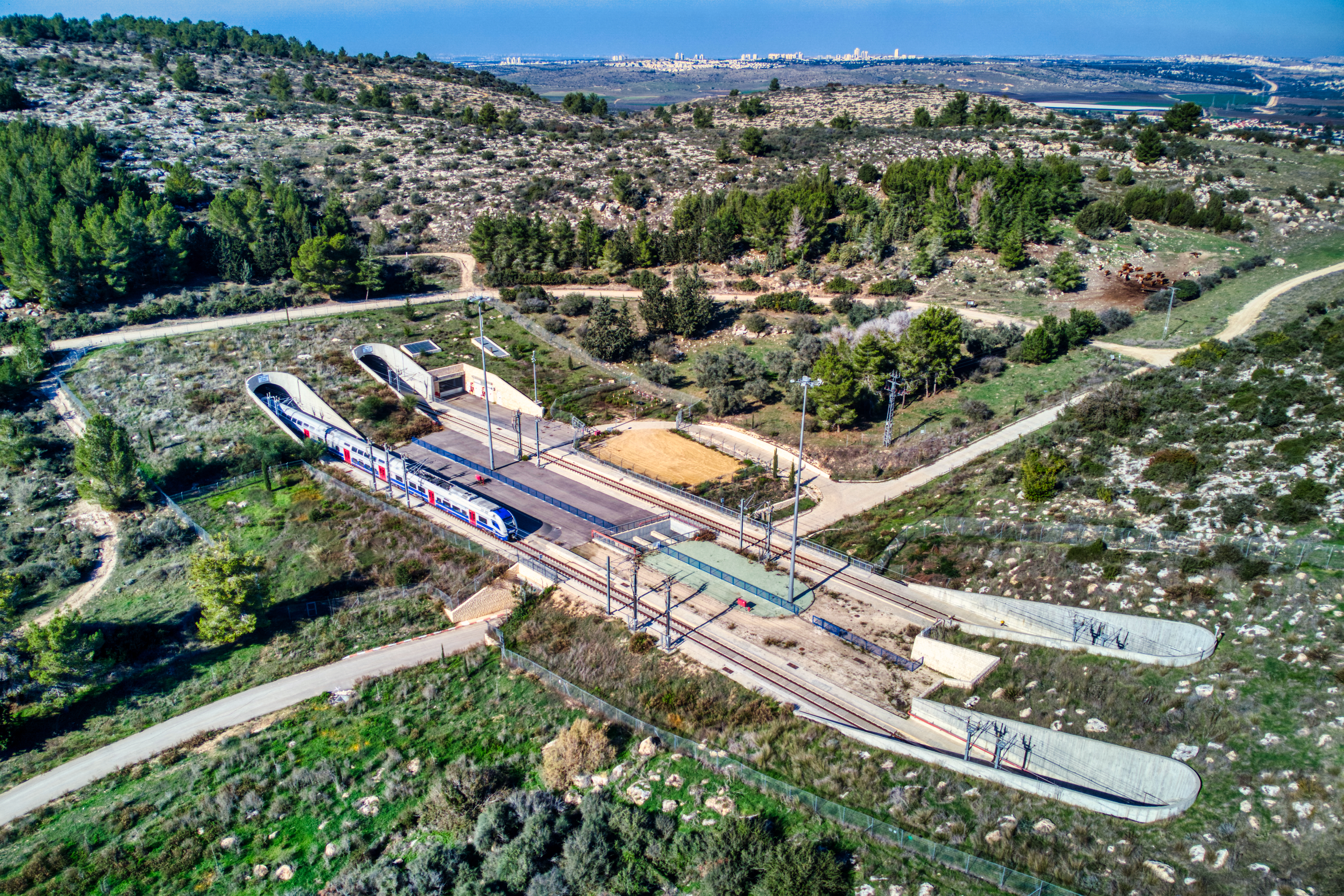
Bridge no. 7

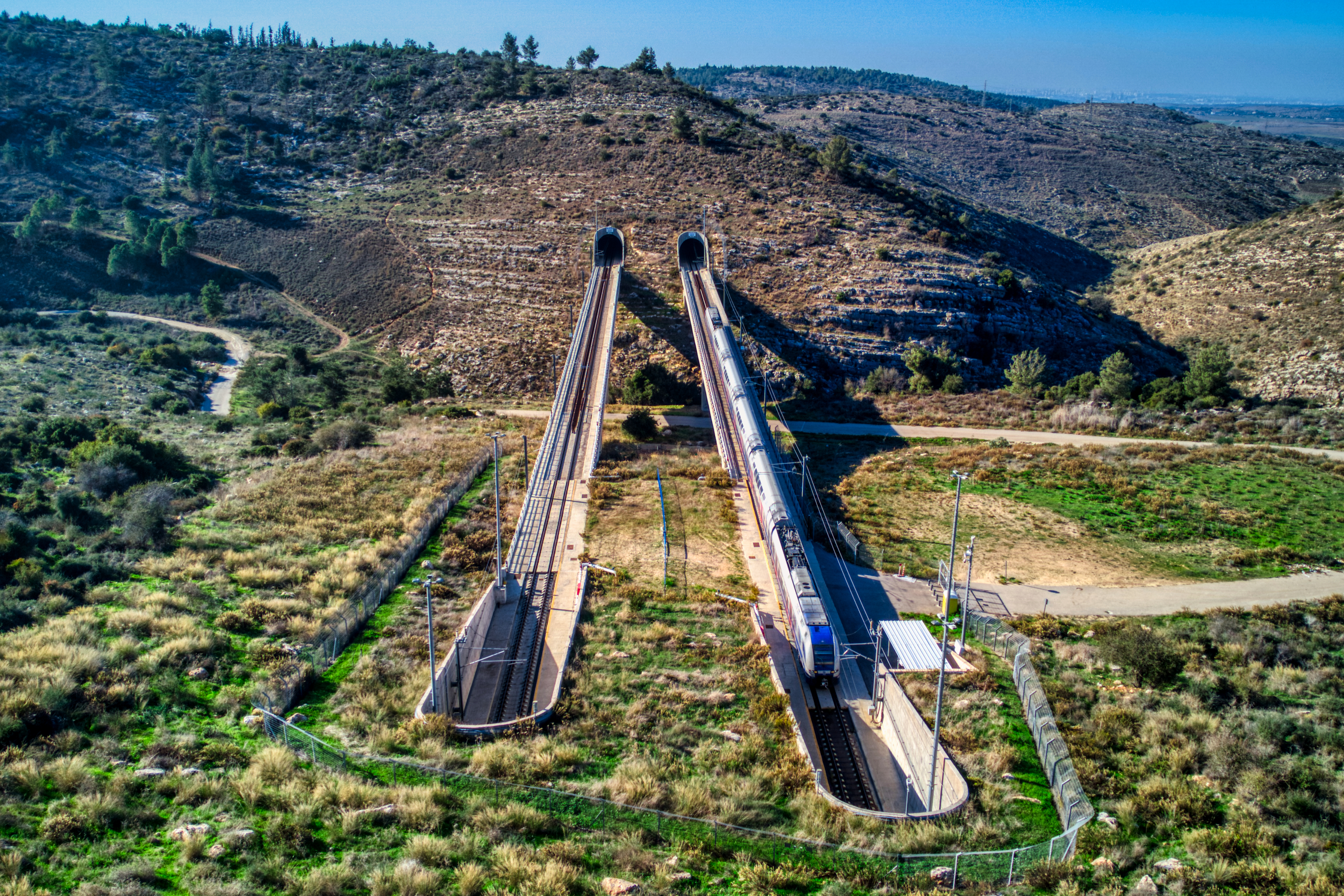
Bridge no. 8, Nahal Yitla railway bridge

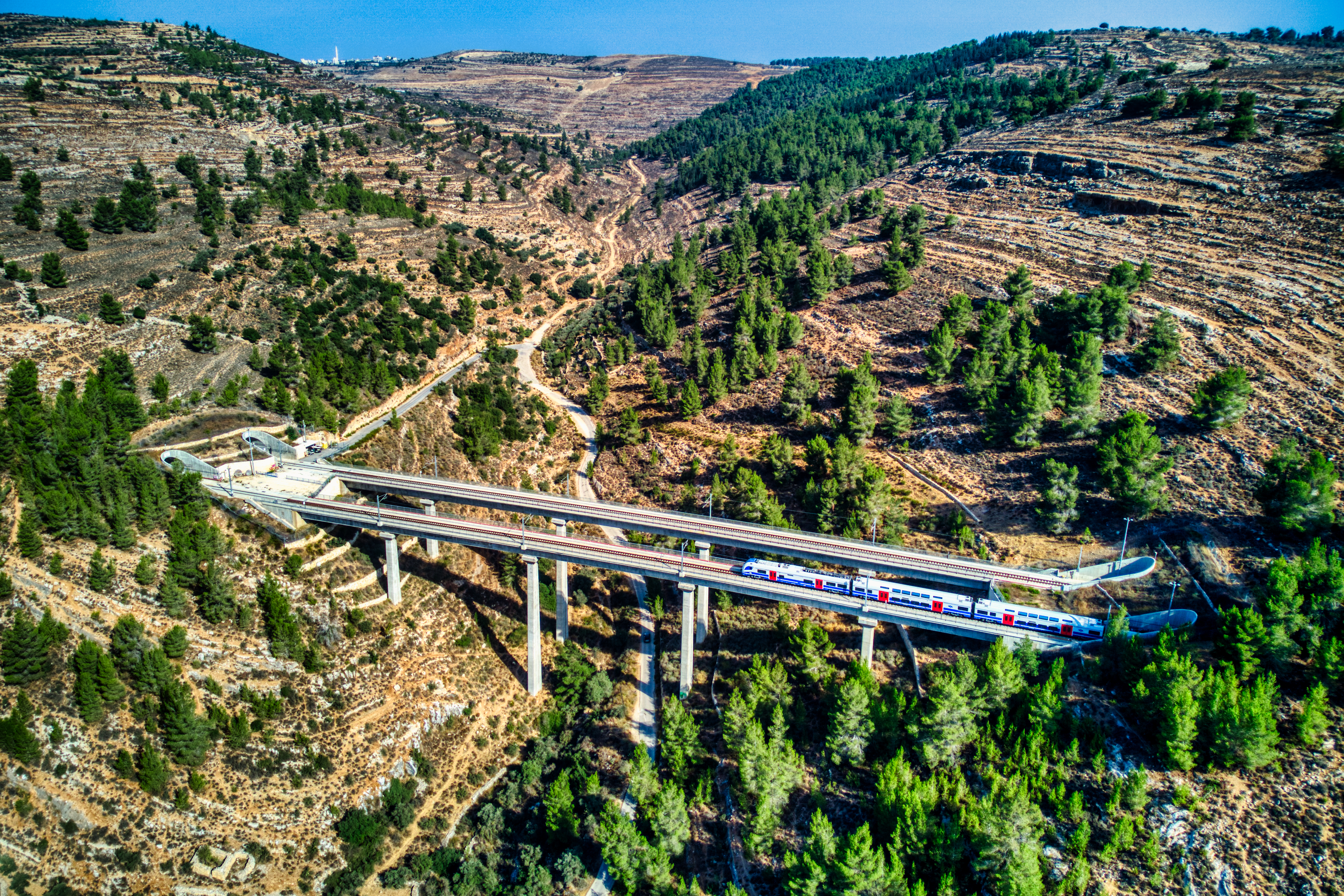
Bridge no. 9, Nahal Luz railway bridge

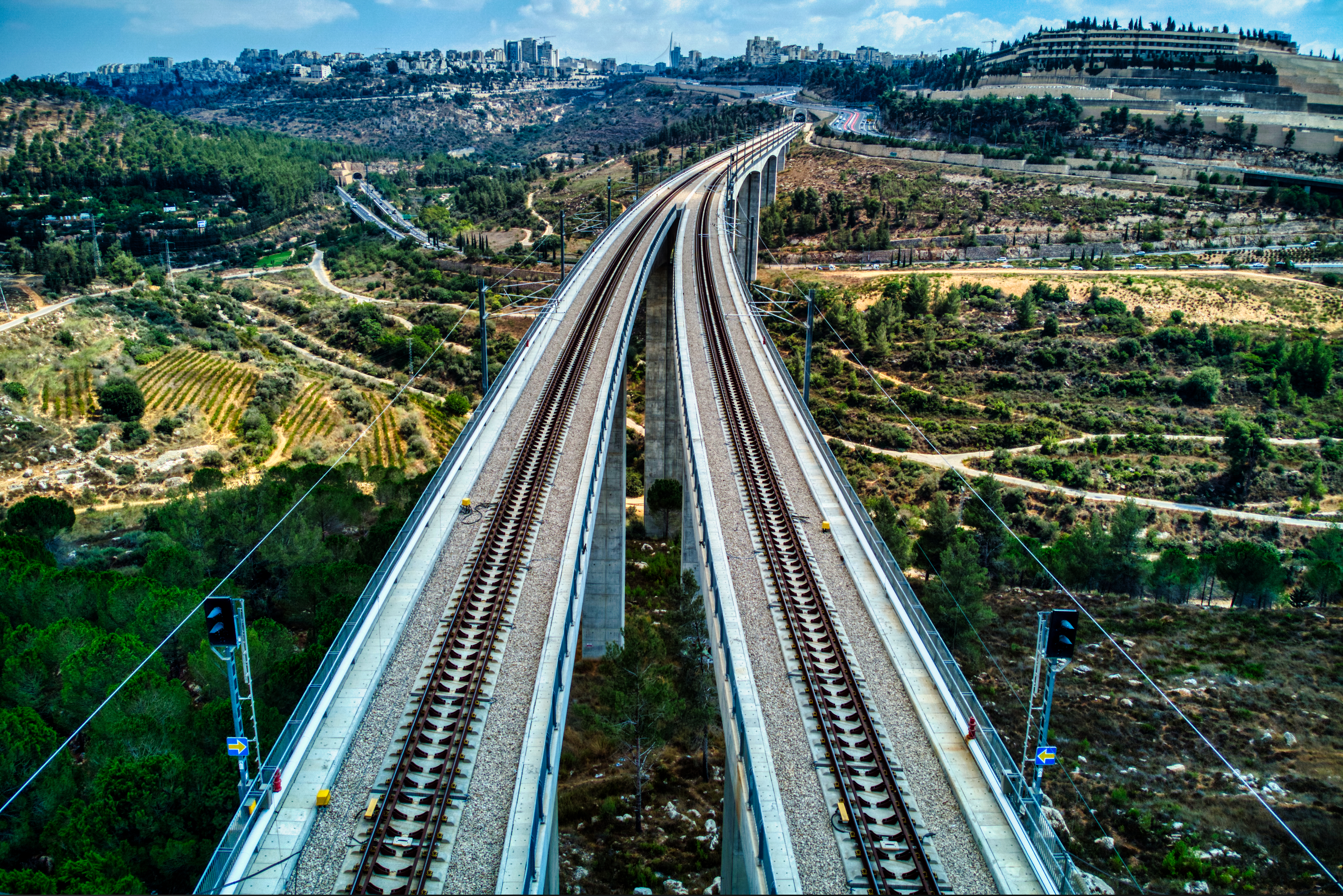
Bridge no. 10, Arazim railway bridge

=== Electrification ===
The sections to Ben Gurion Airport and onwards to Anava junction were initially constructed without electrification and served the passenger line from Tel Aviv to the airport and Modi'in using diesel rolling stock. After the completion of the Anava–Jerusalem section, electrification of the railway using 25 kV 50 Hz AC overhead catenary began, which once completed facilitated the commencement of train service between Jerusalem and Ben Gurion Airport in September 2018. Over the following two years, the section of railway between the airport to and through Tel Aviv to Herzliya was electrified in stages. The section of the Eastern Railway between the airport and Lod station (which contains a major train maintenance depot) was also electrified. The new railway to Jerusalem was the first heavy rail line in Israel to be electrified and marked the beginning of an overall effort to electrify most of Israel Railways' lines by the mid-2020s.

== Stations ==
The following stations are found on the line:

- Ben Gurion Airport Railway Station – located within Terminal 3 of the Ben Gurion International Airport.
- Jerusalem–Yitzhak Navon railway station (initially called Jerusalem—HaUma Railway Station and renamed during construction) – located next to the Jerusalem Central Bus Station, 80 meters underground. The station also doubles as a bomb shelter.

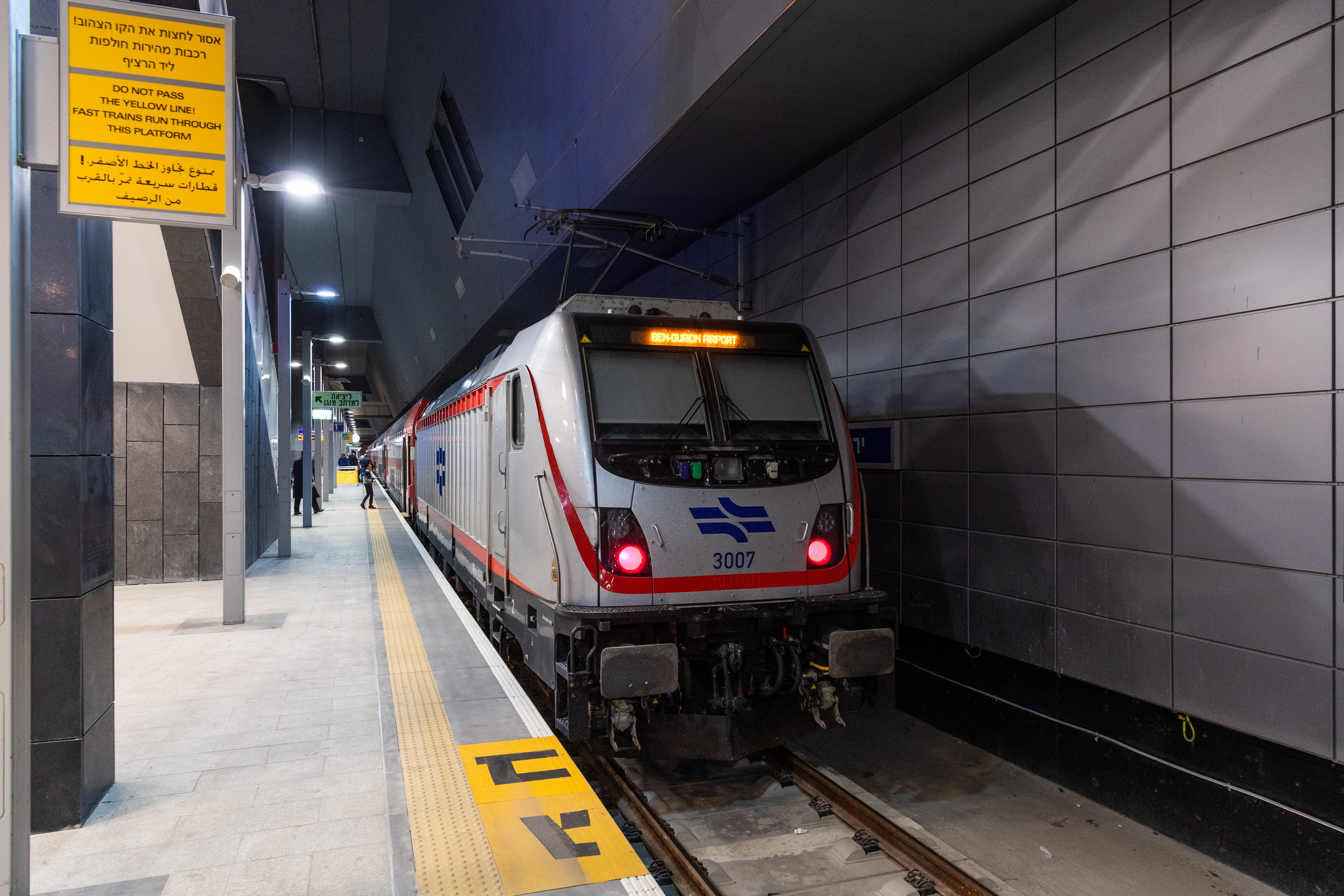
Bombardier TRAXX P160 AC3, Jerusalem–Yitzhak Navon railway station

For the first few years of operation, past the Ben Gurion Airport station, trains from Jerusalem stop at all of Tel Aviv's railway stations and terminate at the Herzliya Railway Station since this is where the initial stage of the railway electrification program ended. Later advances in electrification allowed Night Trains to run from Jerusalem to Netanya, though they were later withdrawn. Eventually, trains will be extended northwards towards Haifa and later to Karmiel as progress is made on electrifying the rest of the northern portion of the Coastal Railway.

On the Jerusalem side, there are proposals to connect Yitzhak Navon station with the Jerusalem Malha station through a continuation of the tunnel from Mevaseret Zion.

=== Modi'in branch ===
The Modi'in branch (which is a section of the future Rishon LeZion–Modi'in railway) was fully opened on April 1, 2008, and includes two stations: Pa'atei Modi'in and Modi'in Center. The latter is underground, similar to the Jerusalem–Yitzhak Navon railway station, therefore making it possible to continue the line further into the city and beyond. In the past, various government panels have expressed the desire to continue this line, but is on hold pending agreement with the Palestinian Authority, as continuation of the rail line from the Modi'in branch northwards or eastwards will have to pass through the West Bank.

The initial configuration of the Modi'in branch only made it possible for trains to and from the direction of the airport and Tel Aviv to reach Modi'in. In 2022 construction was completed on a spur which enables trains to and from the direction of Jerusalem to reach Modi'in as well.

== Challenges ==
=== Financial difficulties ===
Due to the extremely high cost of the project, it faced financial difficulties from the start, despite being Israel Railways' flagship project. The initial cost was estimated at NIS 2.8 billion, although after a re-evaluation in 2008, it rose to about NIS 6 billion, and required NIS 2 billion more to be invested by the Israeli government. This caused a significant delay in starting the tunneling stage of the project pending the evaluation by the Ministry of Transport, which eventually showed that, while the costs rose sharply, forecast demand rose sharply as well. The ministry further decided to indefinitely postpone implementing the plans for a future link from the railway to Modi'in (B2) east to Jerusalem. On December 2, 2008, the Israeli cabinet instructed Israel Railways to continue with the project despite the higher estimate and the Ministry of Finance to allocate the additional NIS 3 billion coverage necessary to proceed with construction. By 2010, the cost had risen to NIS 6.9 billion.

Shapir Engineering, which won the tender to build Section C between Sha'ar HaGai and Mevasseret Zion, was forced to delay the project by two years because Israel Railways issued the tender before the necessary permits were procured from the relevant government authorities. The issue was only resolved in summer 2009. Shapir suffered financial losses because of this, and sued Israel Railways for NIS 500 million, a sum that will be added to the project's overall cost if the courts side with Shapir.

=== Administrative disputes and tender controversies ===
Israel Railways published a tender for supervising the constructions of sections B and C, which stipulated that only companies with experience overseeing projects of NIS 1 billion or more could participate. This caused controversy because only the company Dana Engineering actually had such experience in Israel. The companies Eldad Spivak and A. Epstein joined into a holding company in order to compete in the tender, which they won.

However, Israel Railways appointed Dan Ari, a former executive in Dana Engineering, as responsible for the entire project, and disputes between Spivak and Epstein and Ari led to the holding company's resignation from the project. They were replaced by Dana Engineering. In late 2010, the railways decided to create a new administration for the project, leaving Dan Ari out of the picture.

=== Dirt dumpage and engineering problems ===
A notable stumbling block, still unresolved as of January 2008, is the issue of where to put the excess dirt dug up in the tunnels. Temporary mounds have been created, but this method, aside from hurting the environment, will be insufficient for the main tunnel (Tunnel 3). Israel Railways has also come to odds with the engineering company, Ami Mtom, responsible for the project involving additional payments to be made due to changes made to the original design of the railway, which is likely to further delay progress. Additional dirt will be dumped in a new landfill on a site next to the Sha'ar HaGai interchange between Tel Aviv and Jerusalem.

The project has come under fire for two consecutive tunnel collapses in Tunnel 3a in January and March 2011. Both incidents ended without casualties.

=== Yitla Stream ===
One of the main environmental issues with the project, and a source of opposition from green organizations, is the railway's passage through the Yitla Stream, a national park and Biblical location mentioned in the Book of Joshua. The greens' campaign was led by Ze'ev HaCohen from the Parks Authority and Avraham Shaked from the Society for the Protection of Nature (SPNI), who proposed an alternate design that would have replaced tunnels 2 and 3 with a single, combined longer and deeper tunnel that would pass under the stream, based on the opinion of the German tunneling expert Alfred Haack. According to them, their proposal, opposed by Israel Railways, would have saved money in the long run.

The main points of contention with Israel Railways' proposed design were a 150 m rail bridge (Bridge 8) over the stream, and a 200 m paved access road created to aid the construction work. While Israel Railways and the Ministry of Finance claimed to oppose the longer combined tunnel proposal on financial and construction-time related reasons, Globes columnist Moshe Lichtman argued that the opposition was based on a combination of ego and the unwillingness, in principle, to change construction plans at the last minute. Nevertheless, in March 2009 the Jerusalem area regional infrastructure planning commission recommended against the environmentalists' plan and chose to proceed with Israel Railways' original two-tunnel plan. The plan was then forwarded to the National infrastructure planning commission for a final decision on the matter. On April 5, 2009, the SPNI submitted a petition with thousands of signatures against the line, including that of Prof. Robert Aumann.

On June 23, 2009, the environmentalists' petitions were rejected, and the planning committee decided that there would be a bridge over the Yitla Stream, in line with the previous recommendations of the Sadan Committee. Israel Railways and the Jerusalem Municipality supported the decision. The decision in favor of a bridge over the stream was ratified by the National Planning Committee in August 2009, subject to design changes to be made to the bridge site to make it environmentally friendlier. As a result, to reduce the bridge's footprint, its overall design was changed from a conventional concrete beam bridge composed of multiple segments to a long concrete balanced cantilever design, supported in the middle by a single set of columns. In addition, care was taken to minimize as much as possible the construction activities' impact on the stream's surroundings. Instead of the wide access road, a smaller route was employed and heavy equipment (such as sections of the TBMs for tunnel 3) and digging discharge associated with the construction of the nearly 12 km-long tunnel 3 were instead transported to and from the site through tunnel 2 and over the new bridge.

== Plans ==
After Yitzhak Navon Station was completed, planning began for an extension of the line further into the city with two additional underground stations: Jerusalem–Central railway station near the city's center and a station at the site of the historical Jerusalem–Khan railway station. The estimated cost of the extension is ₪4,685,000,000. The architects, writing the Environmental Impact Survey for the extension, mentioned the tunneling work starting from the historical Khan station's end is due to start in the middle of year 2024 and finish toward 2031.

In addition, Israel Railways is due to introduce 60 new Siemens Desiro HC Double Decker EMUs by the end of 2021. Similarly to the existing Bombardier TRAXX locomotives, these electric multiple units will travel at 160 km/h (100 mph) down the line.

== See also ==
- Rail transport in Israel
