= Jerusalem railway station =

Jerusalem railway station may refer to:

- Jerusalem–Khan railway station, the oldest such station (1892–1998, 2030s planned)
- Jerusalem–Malha railway station (2005–2020)
- Jerusalem–Yitzhak Navon railway station (2018–present)
- Jerusalem–Central railway station (planned)

== See also ==
- Category:Railway stations in Jerusalem
