= Tel Aviv–University railway station =

Railway station in Tel Aviv, Israel

Tel Aviv–University תל אביב – האוניברסיטה
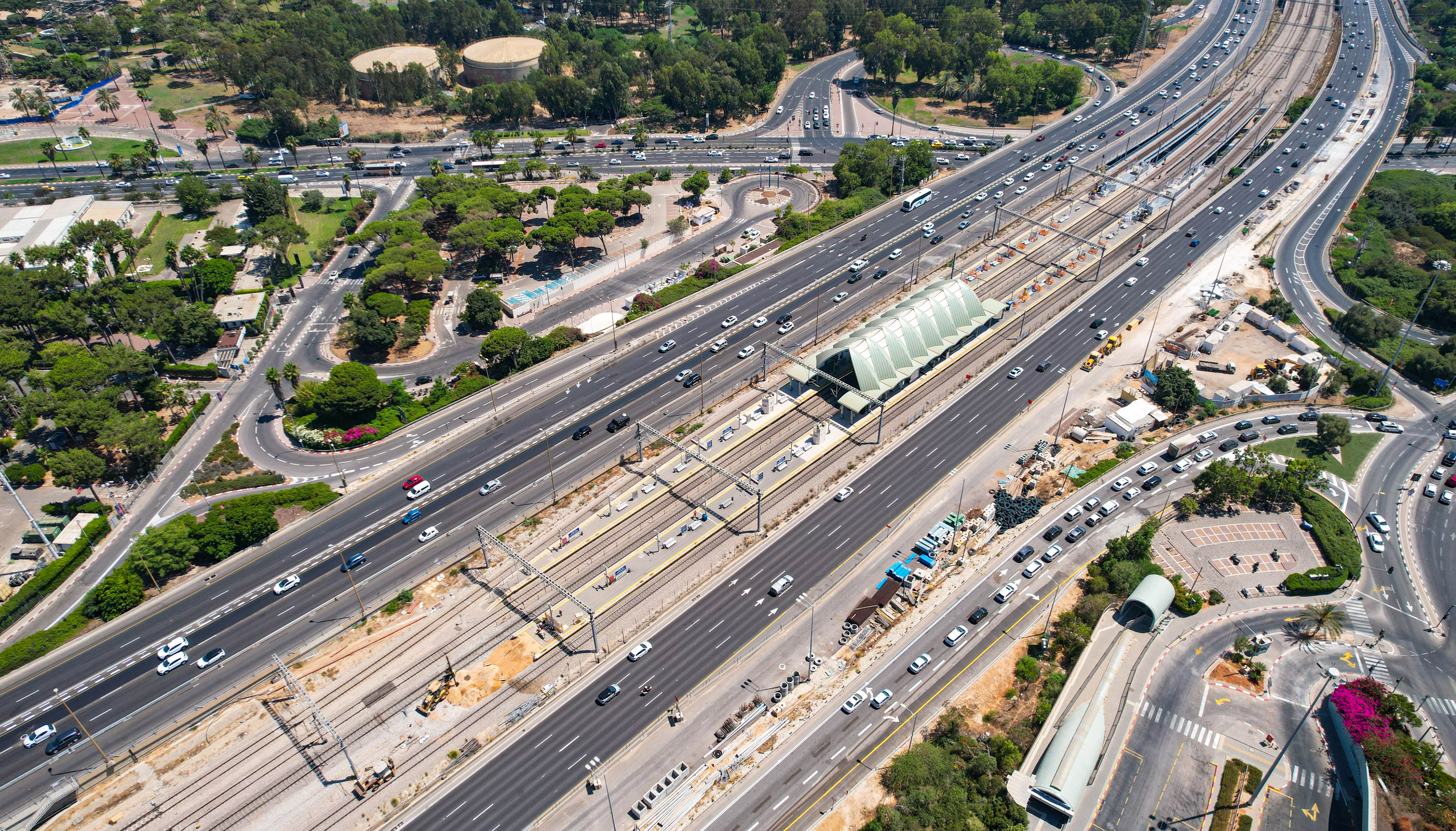

General information
- Location: 95 Rokah Blvd., Tel Aviv, Israel
- Coordinates: 32°06′13″N 34°48′16.5″E
- Platforms: 2
- Tracks: 4

Construction
- Parking: 170 spaces

History
- Opened: 26 October 2000; 25 years ago
- Electrified: 6 September 2020; 5 years ago

Passengers
- 2019: 6,499,857
- Rank: 4 out of 68
Location

Tel Aviv–University railway station is an Israel Railways station in northern Tel Aviv, Israel. It is officially named Tel Aviv Universita – Merkaz HaYeridim in Hebrew (English: Tel Aviv University – Exhibition Center), due to its proximity to Tel Aviv University and Expo Tel Aviv (the Tel Aviv fairgrounds and convention center, commonly known as Ganei HaTaarucha).

The station has four platforms connected by pedestrian tunnels. It is the northernmost passenger rail station in Tel Aviv; non-stop trains from the station can reach southern Haifa's Hof HaCarmel railway station in about 40 minutes. Outside the station, there is a bus terminal serving the areas adjacent to the university.

In 2019, over six million passengers used the station, making it the fourth-busiest in the country.

== Access ==
The station is located between the lanes of the Ayalon Highway at the Rokah Boulevard interchange. The western entrance is connected to Tel Aviv University by a long stairway, while the eastern entrance allows foot access to the Israel Trade Fairs & Convention Center and to the Yarkon Park. There is a parking facility located near the eastern entrance, between the station and the Trade Fairs Center. The parking facility can be accessed by private transport from Rokah Boulevard or by taking the Exhibition Center exit from the northbound lane of the Ayalon Highway.

A Dan Bus Company terminal is adjacent to the western entrance of the station. It is the terminus of routes 7, 13, 40, 45, 49, 113 and 289, that connect the station to Tel Aviv University and continue further to different parts of Tel Aviv and Gush Dan. On the eastern entrance of the station there is a small bus terminal that contains only the terminus of Dan bus line 8 that operated on rush hours only.
On Rokah Boulevard, outside the eastern entrance, are stops of Dan routes 8, 22, 40, 89, 122, 189 and 266 as well as routes from Tel Aviv to Herzliya, Ra'anana and Kfar Saba: 47, 48, 247 of Metropoline Bus Company and 521 of the Egged Bus Cooperative.

== Train service ==
Preceding station	Israel Railways	Following station
Binyamina towards Nahariya	Nahariya–Modi'in	Tel Aviv–Savidor Center towards Modi'in–Center
Herzliya towards Nahariya	Nahariya–Beersheba	Tel Aviv–Savidor Center towards Be'er Sheva–Center
Herzliya towards Karmiel	Karmiel–Beersheba	Tel Aviv–Savidor Center towards Be'er Sheva–Center
Herzliya towards Binyamina	Binyamina–Beersheba	Tel Aviv–Savidor Center towards Be'er Sheva–Center
Herzliya towards Netanya	Netanya–Rehovot	Tel Aviv–Savidor Center towards Rehovot
Herzliya towards Netanya	Netanya–Beit Shemesh	Tel Aviv–Savidor Center towards Beit Shemesh
Herzliya Terminus	Herzliya–Jerusalem	Tel Aviv–Savidor Center towards Jerusalem–Yitzhak Navon
Bnei Brak–Ramat HaHayal towards Herzliya	Herzliya–Ashkelon	Tel Aviv–Savidor Center towards Ashkelon

== Station layout ==
Platform numbers increase in a West-to-East direction

Platform 1	Nahariya–Modi'in trains toward Nahariya (Binyamina) → Nahariya–Beersheba trains toward Nahariya (Herzliya during peak hours; Haifa–Hof HaCarmel during off-peak hours) → Karmiel–Beersheba trains toward Karmiel (Herzliya) → Binyamina–Beersheba trains toward Binyamina (Herzliya) → Netanya–Rehovot and Netanya–Beit Shemesh trains toward Netanya (Herzliya) (peak hours only) → Herzliya–Jerusalem trains toward Herzliya (Terminus) → Night Train toward Herzliya or Nahariya does not stop here →
Island platform
Platform 2	← Nahariya–Modi'in trains toward Modi'in–Center (Tel Aviv–Savidor Center) ← Nahariya–Beersheba, Karmiel–Beersheba and Binyamina–Beersheba trains toward Be'er Sheva–Center (Tel Aviv–Savidor Center) ← Netanya–Rehovot trains toward Rehovot (Tel Aviv–Savidor Center) (peak hours only) ← Netanya–Beit Shemesh trains toward Beit Shemesh (Tel Aviv–Savidor Center) (peak hours only) ← Herzliya–Jerusalem trains toward Jerusalem–Yitzhak Navon (Tel Aviv–Savidor Center) ← Night Train toward Ben Gurion Airport or Jerusalem–Yitzhak Navon does not stop here
Platform 3	Herzliya–Ashkelon trains toward Herzliya (Bnei Brak–Ramat HaHayal) →
Island platform
Platform 4	← Herzliya–Ashkelon trains toward Ashkelon (Tel Aviv–Savidor Center)

== Ridership ==
Passengers boarding and disembarking by year
Year	Passengers	Rank	Source
2021	3,132,561 (▲1,248,751)	5 of 66 (▼1)	2021 Freedom of Information Law Annual Report
2020	1,883,810 (▼4,616,047)	4 of 68	2020 Freedom of Information Law Annual Report
2019	6,499,857	4 of 68	2019 Freedom of Information Law Annual Report
