= Tel Aviv–Savidor Center railway station =

Railway station in Tel Aviv, Israel

Tel Aviv–Savidor Center תל אביב – סבידור מרכז
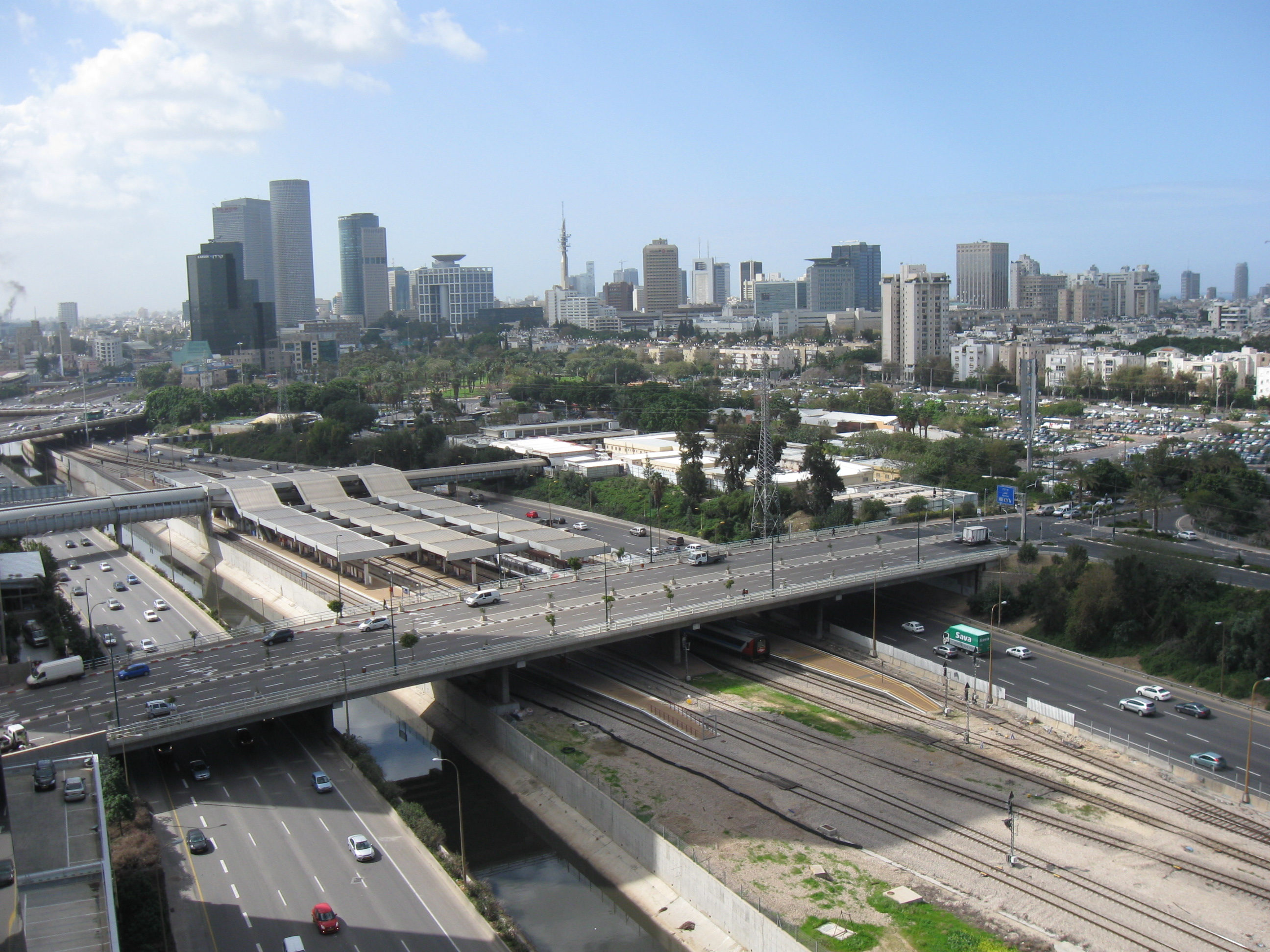

General information
- Location: 10 Al Parashat Drakhim St., Tel Aviv
- Coordinates: 32°05′02″N 34°47′54″E
- Line: Ayalon Railway
- Platforms: 3
- Tracks: 6

Construction
- Parking: 3000 payable spaces
- Cycle facilities: 50 spaces
- Accessible: yes

History
- Opened: 3 November 1953; 73 years ago
- Rebuilt: 1988; 38 years ago
- Electrified: 5 April 2020; 6 years ago

Passengers
- 2019: 13,426,398
- Rank: 2 out of 68
Location

The Tel Aviv–Savidor Center railway station (Hebrew: תֵּל אָבִיב – סָבִידוֹר מֶרְכָּז, Tel Aviv Savidor Merkaz, Arabic: تل أبيب مركز سافيدور) is a major railway station on the Ayalon Railway in central Tel Aviv, Israel, serving most lines of Israel Railways.

It is located in the median of the Ayalon Highway at the Arlozorov interchange, with bridges over the highway linking passengers to a large bus terminal to the west and light rail station to the south, and to the Ramat Gan Diamond Exchange District to the east. In 2019, over 13 million passengers used the station, making it the busiest in the country after HaShalom station, one stop to the south.

The station was opened to the public in November 1954 under the name Tel Aviv Central, and throughout its history was also widely known as Arlozorov station. It was eventually named after Menachem Savidor, Israel Railways' chairman between 1954–1964 and later the Speaker of the Knesset.

It has three island platforms serving a total of six tracks, the most recent of which were built in 2005. An additional island platform and two more tracks are expected to be added to the station in the late-2020s as part of the project to expand the capacity of the Ayalon Railway. Electrification works in the station were completed in 2020.

In 2018, a northern access terminal fronting Modai'i bridge opened, adding a third passenger entry and exit point out of the station and facilitating additional access to the Diamond Exchange District.

The Arolozorov underground light rail station opened on 18 August 2023. It is located about 125 m south of the main entrance to Savidor Central railway station and provides access to the Red Line light rail line. However, this location is inconvenient, as it is separated from the station's entrance by a large parking lot and bus terminal; the Abba Hillel light rail station, 250 m to the east of the Diamond Exchange district exit, can be reached easier by foot.

== History ==
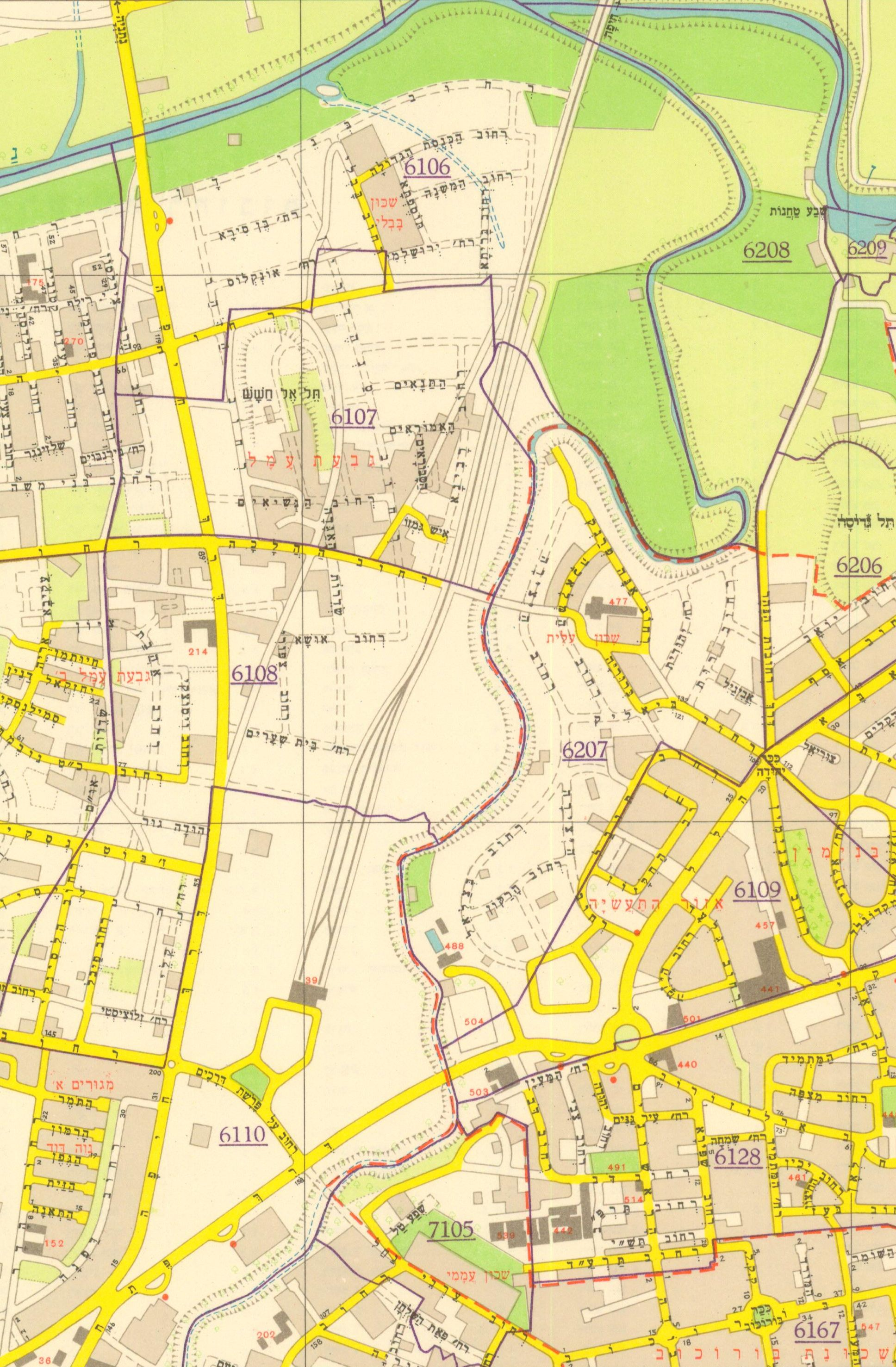
The original terminus before the relocation, on a map from 1958

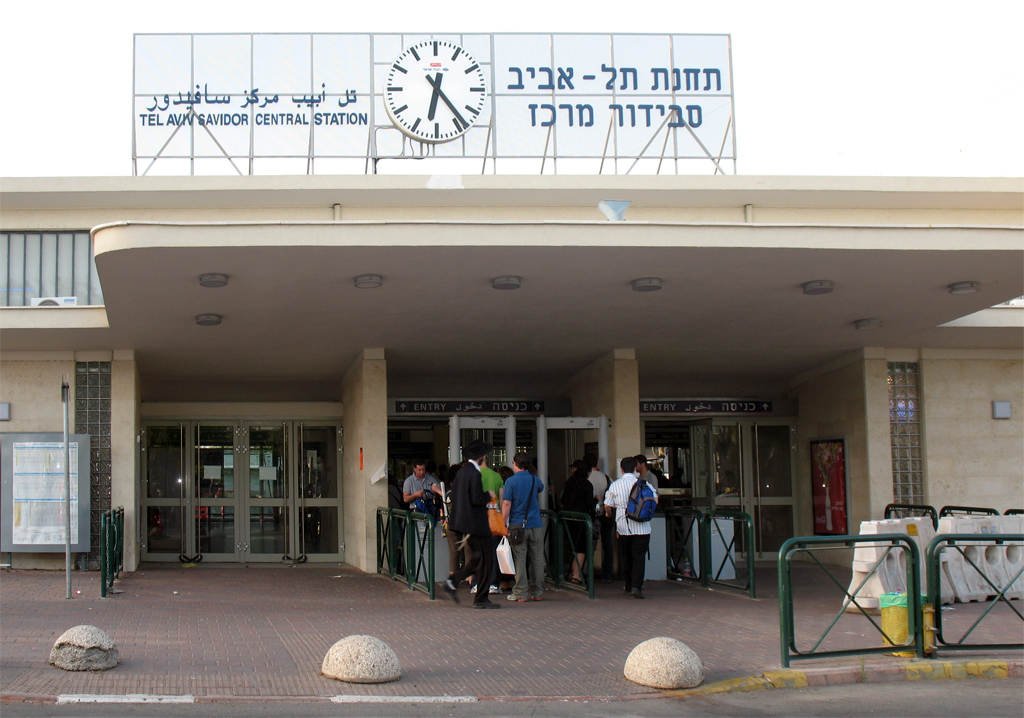
Entrance

The railway station was originally the southern terminus of the Coastal railway line, which opened on November 3, 1954 and reached what was then the northern fringe of Tel Aviv. For the next four decades, it only handled trains to and from the north, and was colloquially known as Tel Aviv North station. This colloquial name could be ambiguous because between 1949 and Tel Aviv central's opening in 1954, "Tel Aviv North" was the official name of the Bnei Brak railway station. Railway service to and from destinations south of Tel Aviv was provided from Tel Aviv South railway station, which was not connected to Tel Aviv Central.

In its initial configuration as a terminal station, the passenger platforms were located directly north of the terminal building, to the west of their present location. In 1988, the tracks leading to the station (along the present Pinchas Sapir Street) were shifted eastwards as works on the Ayalon Highway and railway progressed southwards. The station's platforms were then moved to their current location and a pedestrian bridge over the Ayalon Highway was built to connect them to the terminal building to the west. The station with its relocated tracks was opened to the public on January 10, 1988, and the official opening took place on May 3 of the same year. In 1993, the station ceased being a terminal station when the Ayalon section of the coastal railway was extended to link with the Jaffa–Jerusalem railway in southern Tel Aviv. At that point, the little-used Tel Aviv South station (which unlike Tel Aviv Central was not located on the Ayalon line) was closed for passengers and services operating to it were routed to the more conveniently located Tel Aviv Central station instead. Between the closing of Tel Aviv South and the opening of Tel Aviv HaShalom in 1996, Tel Aviv Central was the only active passenger railway station in the city.

Until 1980, the head office of Israel Railways was located at Haifa Central station when Tzvi Tzafriry, the general manager of Israel Railways decided to move the head office to Tel Aviv Central. In 2017 Israel Railways' head office was relocated from Tel Aviv Central to a new office complex situated on the grounds of the Lod railway station, with a new Lod passenger terminal later built directly to its south.

== Central bus terminal ==
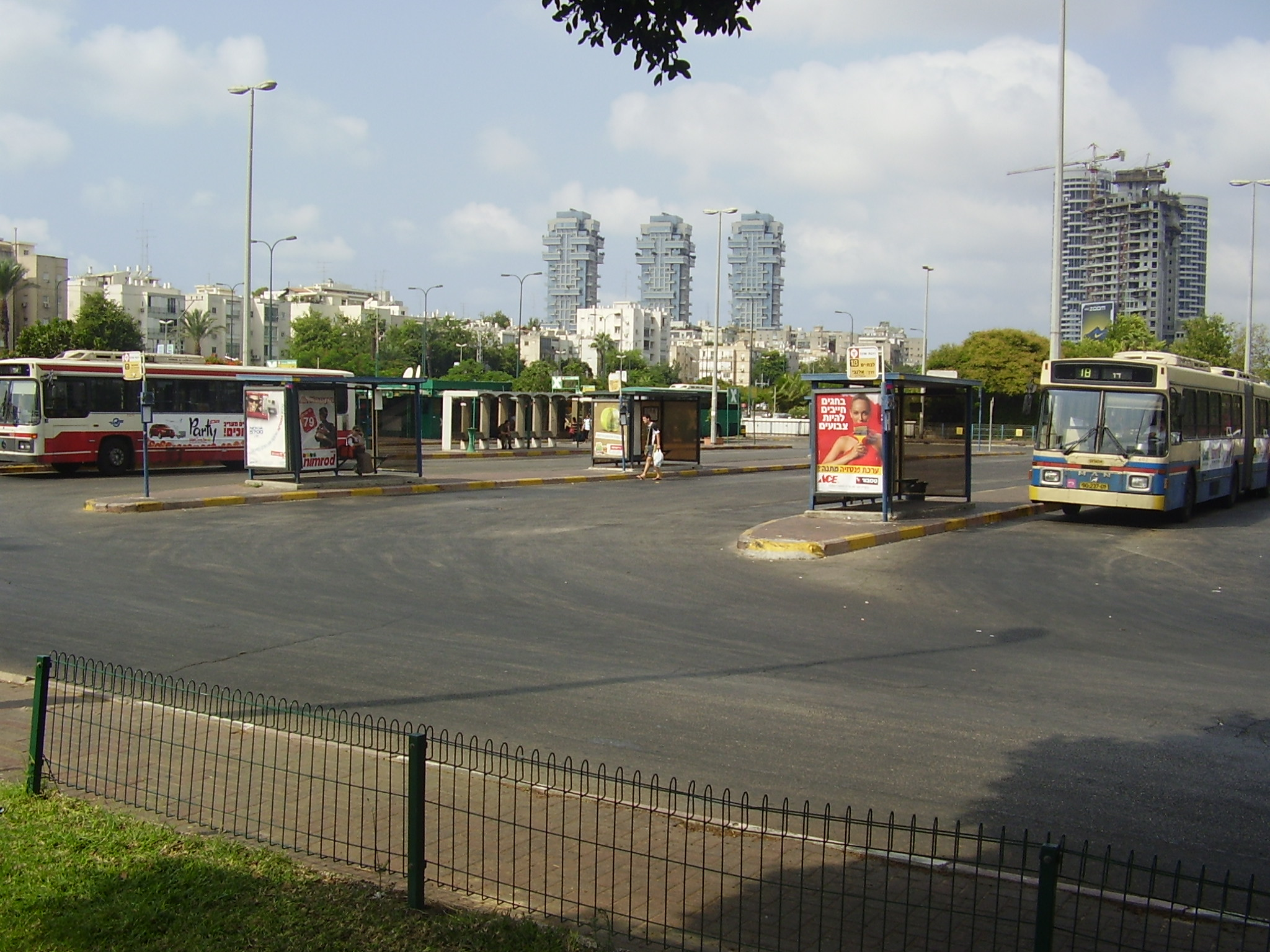
The central bus terminal in 2007

The central bus terminal (מסוף רכבת מרכז), Arlozorov Terminal or Tel Aviv 2000 Terminal (מסוף 2000), is a major bus station located next to the Tel Aviv Central railway station, near the border of Tel Aviv and Ramat Gan, next to the Ayalon Highway and the junction of several traffic arteries: Jabotinsky Road that leads to Ramat Gan, Bnei Brak and Petah Tikva, Begin Road that goes to south Tel Aviv, Namir Road to north Tel Aviv and further to Highway 2 and Arlozorov street westward to the sea. Arlozorov/2000 Terminal should not be confused however with the Tel Aviv central bus station, located in southern Tel Aviv – nearby the HaHagana railway station.

Together, the bus and train terminals and the underground light rail station at the site constitute a major transportation hub that plays a significant role in both short- and long-distance public transportation in Israel. As of 2016 the bus terminal serves about 120,000 passengers daily.

Buses of Egged, Dan, Kavim, Metropoline, Afikim, and other bus companies stop at the terminal and surrounding streets.

The terminal lies in the open air, unlike the central bus stations in Tel Aviv, Jerusalem and some other cities, which are inside large buildings that also double as shopping malls. The open-air terminal underwent renovations in 2018–2019.

== Train service ==
Preceding station	Israel Railways	Following station
Tel Aviv–University towards Nahariya	Nahariya–Modi'in	Tel Aviv–HaShalom towards Modi'in–Center
Tel Aviv–University towards Nahariya	Nahariya–Beersheba	Tel Aviv–HaShalom towards Be'er Sheva–Center
Tel Aviv–University towards Karmiel	Karmiel–Beersheba	Tel Aviv–HaShalom towards Be'er Sheva–Center
Tel Aviv–University towards Binyamina	Binyamina–Beersheba	Tel Aviv–HaShalom towards Be'er Sheva–Center
Tel Aviv–University towards Netanya	Netanya–Rehovot	Tel Aviv–HaShalom towards Rehovot
Tel Aviv–University towards Netanya	Netanya–Beit Shemesh	Tel Aviv–HaShalom towards Beit Shemesh
Tel Aviv–University towards Herzliya	Herzliya–Ashkelon	Tel Aviv–HaShalom towards Ashkelon
Tel Aviv–University towards Herzliya	Herzliya–Jerusalem	Tel Aviv–HaShalom towards Jerusalem–Yitzhak Navon
Herzliya towards Nahariya or Herzliya	Night Train	Ben Gurion Airport towards Ben Gurion Airport or Jerusalem–Yitzhak Navon

== Station layout ==
Platform numbers increase in a West-to-East direction

Platform 1	Nahariya–Modi'in trains toward Nahariya (Tel Aviv–University) → Herzliya–Jerusalem trains toward Herzliya (Tel Aviv–University) → Night Train toward Herzliya or Nahariya (Herzliya) →
Island platform
Platform 2	Nahariya–Beersheba trains toward Nahariya (Tel Aviv–University) → Nahariya–Beersheba termination track (selected off-peak trains) → Karmiel–Beersheba trains toward Karmiel (Tel Aviv–University) → Binyamina–Beersheba trains toward Binyamina (Tel Aviv–University) → Netanya–Rehovot trains toward Netanya (Tel Aviv–University) (peak hours only) → Netanya–Beit Shemesh trains toward Netanya (Tel Aviv–University) (peak hours) → Netanya–Beit Shemesh termination track (off-peak hours) →
Platform 3	← Nahariya–Modi'in trains toward Modi'in–Center (Tel Aviv–HaShalom) ← Nahariya–Beersheba and Karmiel–Beersheba trains toward Be'er Sheva–Center (Tel Aviv–HaShalom) ← Binyamina–Beersheba trains toward Be'er Sheva–Center (Tel Aviv–HaShalom) ← Netanya–Rehovot trains toward Rehovot (Tel Aviv–HaShalom) (peak hours only) ← Netanya–Beit Shemesh trains toward Beit Shemesh (Tel Aviv–HaShalom) (peak hours only)
Island platform
Platform 4	← Binyamina–Beersheba trains toward Be'er Sheva–Center (Tel Aviv–HaShalom) ← Netanya–Beit Shemesh trains toward Beit Shemesh (Tel Aviv–HaShalom) during off-peak hours only ← Herzliya–Jerusalem trains toward Jerusalem–Yitzhak Navon (Tel Aviv–HaShalom) ← Night Train toward Ben Gurion Airport or Jerusalem–Yitzhak Navon (Ben Gurion Airport)
Platform 5	Herzliya–Ashkelon trains toward Herzliya (Tel Aviv–University) →
Island platform
Platform 6	← Herzliya–Ashkelon trains toward Ashkelon (Tel Aviv–HaShalom)

== Ridership ==
Passengers boarding and disembarking by year
Year	Passengers	Rank	Source
2021	6,476,362 (▲1,495,825)	2 of 66	2021 Freedom of Information Law Annual Report
2020	4,980,537 (▼8,445,861)	2 of 68	2020 Freedom of Information Law Annual Report
2019	13,426,398	2 of 68	2019 Freedom of Information Law Annual Report

== See also ==
- History of Tel Aviv
- Transport in Israel
