= Ben Gurion Airport railway station =

Railway station in Ben Gurion International Airport, Israel

Ben Gurion Airport נמל התעופה בן גוריון
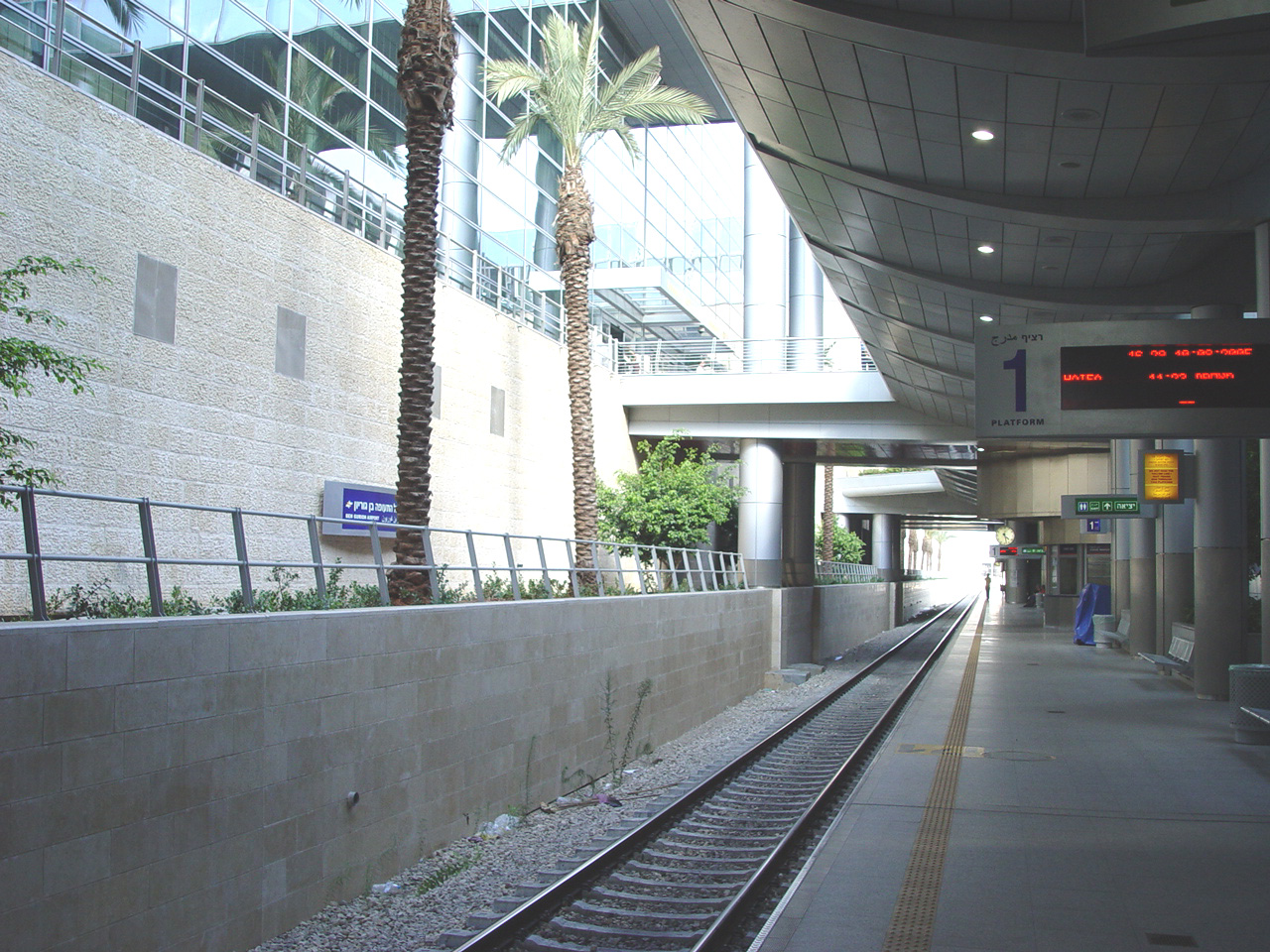
- Platform 1 of the airport train station at Terminal 3

General information
- Location: Ben Gurion Airport, Israel
- Coordinates: 32°00′01.66″N 34°52′13.91″E
- Line: Tel Aviv–Jerusalem
- Platforms: 2

Construction
- Accessible: Yes

History
- Opened: 10 October 2004; 22 years ago
- Electrified: 20 September 2018; 8 years ago

Passengers
- 2019: 4,383,073
- Rank: 6 out of 68

Services
Preceding station	Israel Railways	Following station
Tel Aviv–HaHagana towards Nahariya	Nahariya–Modi'in	Paatei Modi'in towards Modi'in–Center
Tel Aviv–HaHagana towards Herzliya	Herzliya–Jerusalem	Jerusalem–Yitzhak Navon Terminus
Tel Aviv–Savidor Center towards Nahariya or Herzliya	Night Train Herzliya–Jerusalem	Jerusalem–Yitzhak Navon Terminus
Tel Aviv–Savidor Center towards Nahariya or Herzliya	Night Train Nahariya–Ben Gurion Airport	Terminus
Location

Ben Gurion Airport railway station (Hebrew: תחנת הרכבת נמל התעופה בן גוריון, Tahanat HaRakevet Nemal HaTe'ufa Ben Gurion) is an Israel Railways station located in the lower level of Ben Gurion International Airport's Terminal 3. The station opened on 10 October 2004, together with the opening of Terminal 3. The railway line extending to the northwest from the station connects it to Tel Aviv and points north, while in the other direction from the station the railway splits south to Lod and southeast to Modi'in and Jerusalem.

== Services ==
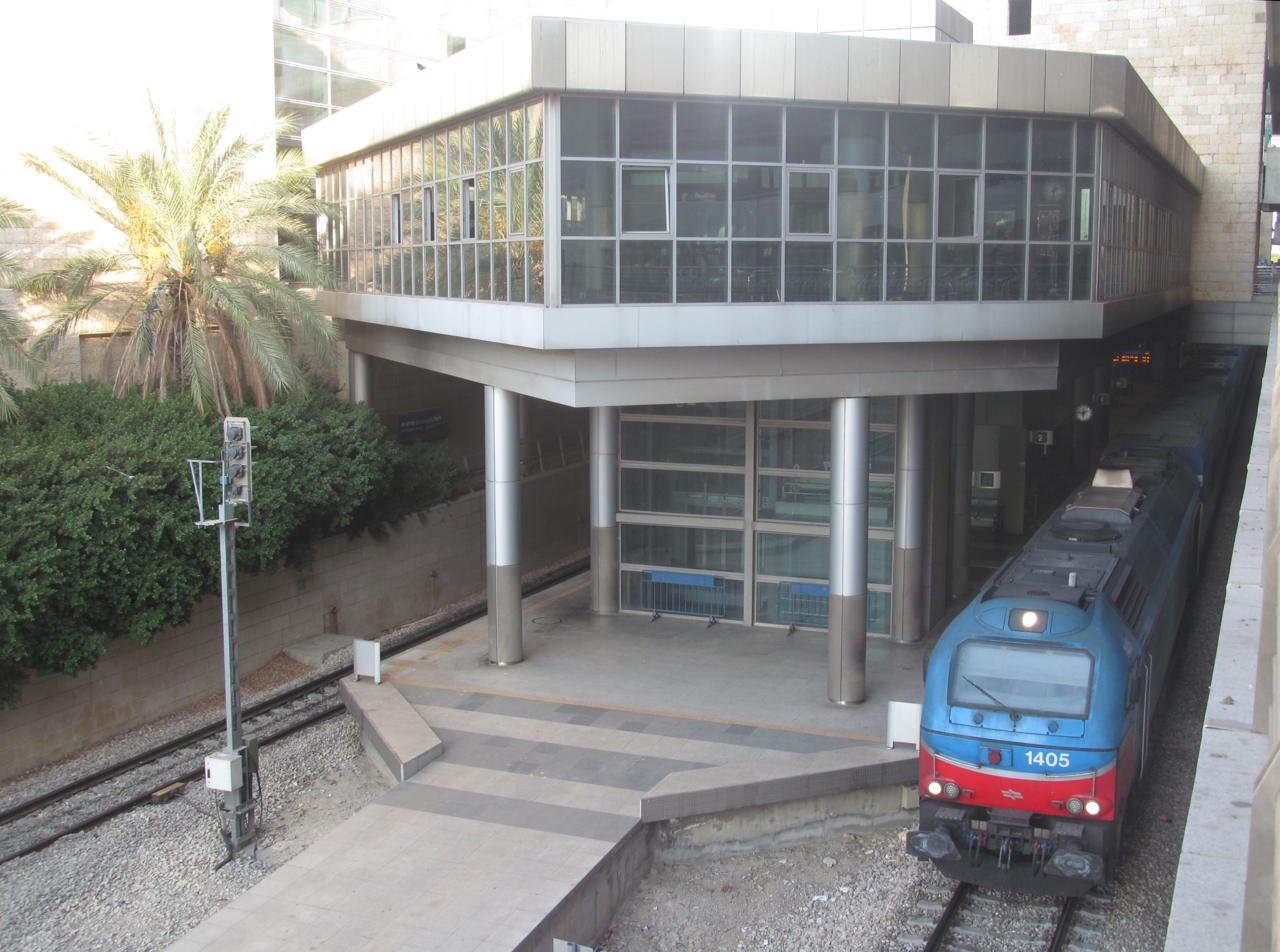
A westbound train at the station, as seen from the arrivals level.

The station currently serves three passenger lines. In August 2019, it handled an average of approximately 22 thousand passengers per day, but its ridership declined severely with the advent of COVID-19 travel restrictions.

=== Nahariya – Haifa – Tel Aviv – Modi'in ===
The rail journey from Ben Gurion Airport to Tel Aviv Savidor Central station takes 15–20 minutes (with intermediate stops at Tel Aviv's HaShalom and HaHagana stations). Most Northbound trains from the airport then continue past Tel Aviv and terminate in Nahariya in northern Israel, making stops in Binyamina, Haifa, the Krayot and Acre (with a total journey time of about 2 hours from the airport to Nahariya). The service to and from Nahariya operates from 5 AM to 15 past Midnight the following day, except on Shabbat (i.e., from Friday evening to Saturday evenings) and on Jewish Holidays, operating twice per hour and in the opposite direction from the airport terminating in Modi'in to the southeast. Before the COVID-19 pandemic, the line operated 24 hours a day except on Shabbat and Jewish Holidays, and there was one train per hour from during late night and early morning.

=== Hadera West/Netanya – Tel Aviv – Jerusalem ===
The station is a stop on the Tel Aviv–Jerusalem railway. Travel time from the airport to Jerusalem–Yitzhak Navon station is just under 25 minutes, with trains running approximately every 30 minutes during the day and evening.

On 14 November 2026, Israel Railways introduced a new timetable extending the Jerusalem–Tel Aviv–Herzliya service northwards to Beit Yehoshua, Netanya and Hadera West. The extension provides direct daytime and evening connections between these stations, Ben Gurion Airport and Jerusalem without requiring passengers to change trains. Previously, regular daytime and evening services terminated at Herzliya, while trains continued farther north during overnight hours.

During late nights and early mornings, the service operates approximately once per hour, with trains continuing northwards to Binyamina. The line operates throughout the night, except during Shabbat, certain Jewish holidays and scheduled maintenance periods.

=== Night trains to southern Israel ===
Before the COVID-19 pandemic, during late nights and early mornings there was one train per hour to and from the airport terminating at Beersheba Center via Lod, Rehovot, Ashdod, Ashkelon and selected stops in between.

=== Future services ===
With the new fast line to Jerusalem and the current construction of two new railway lines (the new Eastern line and the new Rishon Lezion-Modi’in line) that will connect to the Ben Gurion Airport line, an extra 6 km (3.7 mi) of double tracks will be added with new platforms on the southern side of the current station to accommodate the increase in traffic.

== Station layout ==
Platform numbers increase in a North-to-South direction

Platform 1	Nahariya–Modi'in trains toward Modi'in–Center (Paatei Modi'in) → Hadera–Jerusalem trains toward Jerusalem–Yitzhak Navon (terminus) → Night Train toward Jerusalem–Yitzhak Navon (terminus) →
Island platform
Platform 2	← Nahariya–Modi'in trains toward Nahariya (Tel Aviv–HaHagana) ← Hadera–Jerusalem trains toward Netanya or Hadera–West (Tel Aviv–HaHagana) ← Night Train toward Herzliya or Nahariya (Tel Aviv–Savidor Center)

== Ridership ==
Passengers boarding and disembarking by year
Year	Passengers	Rank	Source	Notes
2021	881,276 (▲92,409)	26 of 66 (▼5)	2021 Freedom of Information Law Annual Report	Station closed due to COVID-19 restrictions from March 2020 to April 2021; operated in an alighting-only manner from November 2021 until the end of the year
2020	788,867 (▼3,594,206)	21 of 68 (▼15)	2020 Freedom of Information Law Annual Report	Station closed in March 2020 due to COVID-19 restrictions and remained closed at the end of the year
2019	4,383,073	6 of 68	2019 Freedom of Information Law Annual Report	
