= Jerusalem–Malha railway station =

Railway station in Jerusalem, Israel

Jerusalem–Malha ירושלים – מלחה
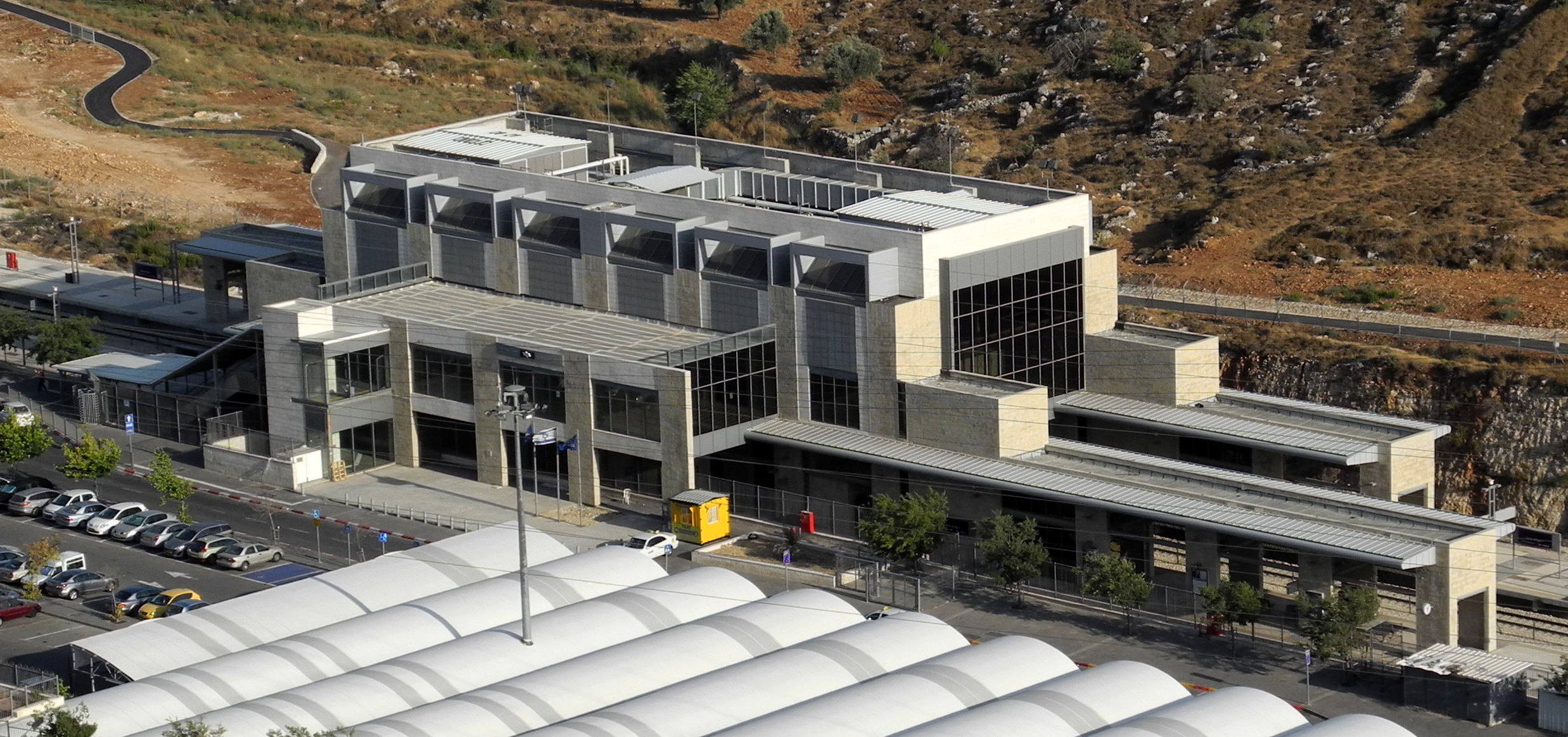

General information
- Location: Jerusalem, Israel
- Coordinates: 31°44.885′N 35°11.252′E
- Line: Jaffa–Jerusalem railway
- Platforms: 2
- Tracks: 4

Construction
- Platform levels: 3
- Accessible: yes

History
- Opened: 9 April 2005; 21 years ago
- Closed: March 2020

Passengers
- 2019: 115,118
- Rank: 66 out of 68
Location

Jerusalem–Malha railway station (Hebrew: תחנת הרכבת ירושלים – מלחה, Tahanat HaRakevet Yerushalayim–Malha; Arabic: محطة أورشليم – المالحة) was one of two Israel Railways termini in Jerusalem, the other being Jerusalem–Yitzhak Navon railway station. The station is located in the southern neighborhood of Malha, across from the Jerusalem Shopping Mall, Pais Arena and Teddy Stadium.

As it is much less centrally located than Navon station, and the historic Jaffa–Jerusalem railway provides a much slower journey to the Tel Aviv area than the modern Tel Aviv–Jerusalem railway, ridership is very low. 115,118 passengers boarded or disembarked at the station in 2019, ahead of only the adjacent Biblical Zoo railway station and Dimona railway station.

Service to the station has been suspended entirely since March 2020 due to poor usage combined with the economic impacts of the COVID-19 pandemic, and it is unclear if or when it will resume.

== History ==
Jerusalem–Malha is the current terminus of the Jaffa–Jerusalem railway. The other Jerusalem station on this line is the Biblical Zoo station which is served by limited stops. Jerusalem Malha was opened on April 9, 2005, when the historic Jaffa–Jerusalem railway was restored after being out of service for six years. The line underwent a major renovation, including the laying of new tracks. Jerusalem Malha replaced the historic Jerusalem railway station near the Old City as the terminus of the line, which was not restored due to the objections of area residents over train noise. The at grade tracks from Malha to Khan have been turned into a mixed use path, called the Park HaMesila, or Train Track Park.

Since February 5, 2006, intercity bus routes to Gush Etzion and the Hebron area stop at Malha station on their way from the Jerusalem Central Bus Station to their destination via Begin Boulevard.

== Future ==
There are conceptual plans to extend the new Tel Aviv–Jerusalem railway from Jerusalem–Yitzhak Navon to Jerusalem–Malha along an underground route beneath Jerusalem; for that reason, Malha station was built as a thorough station at an elevation relative to sea level which is equal to that of Jerusalem–Navon's underground tracks and platforms. Detailed plans unveiled in November 2021 establish the precise course of the extension, which will also pass via a new underground station in central Jerusalem and another underneath the historic Jerusalem-Khan train station.

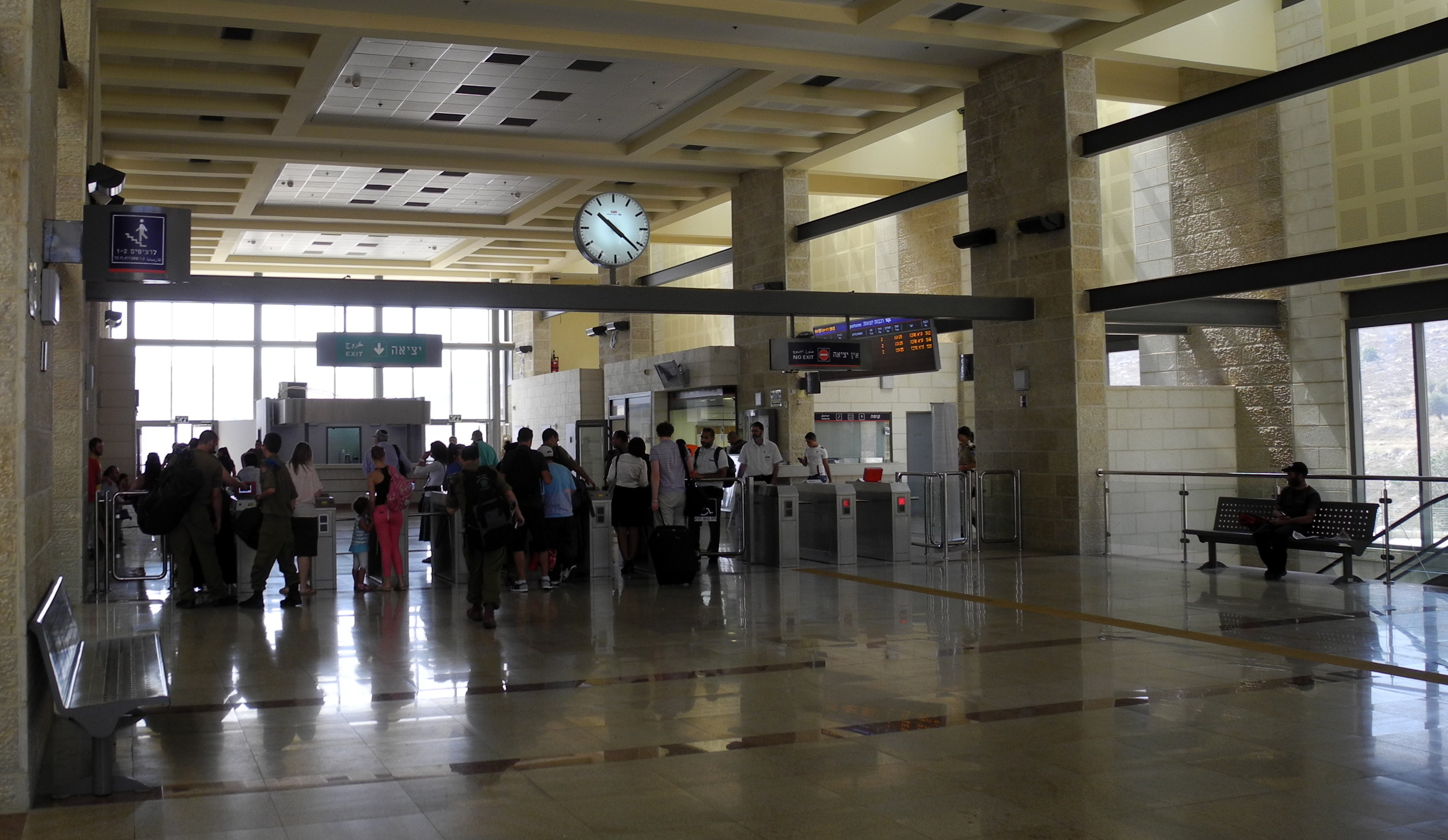
Passengers hall (2013)

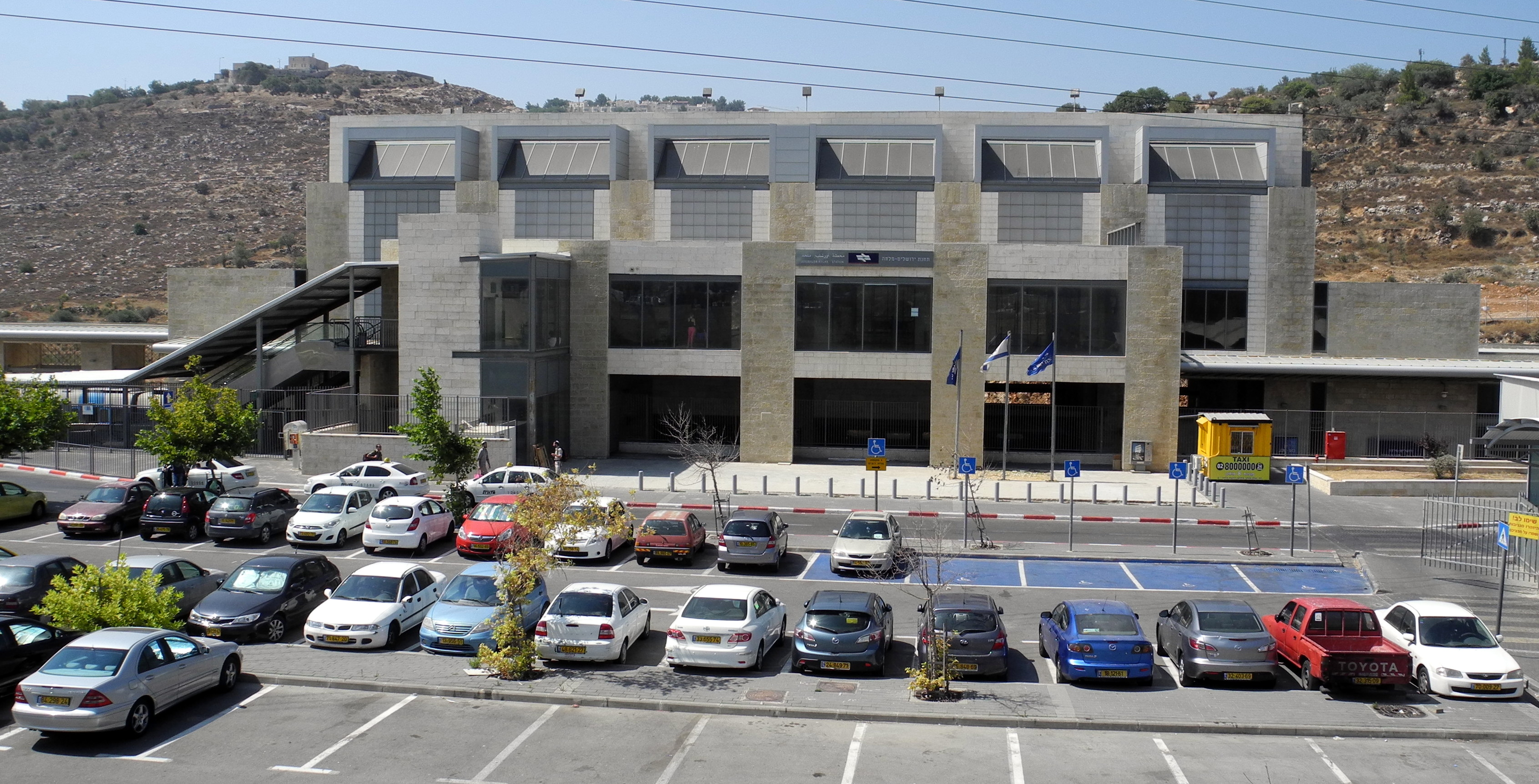
View from outside

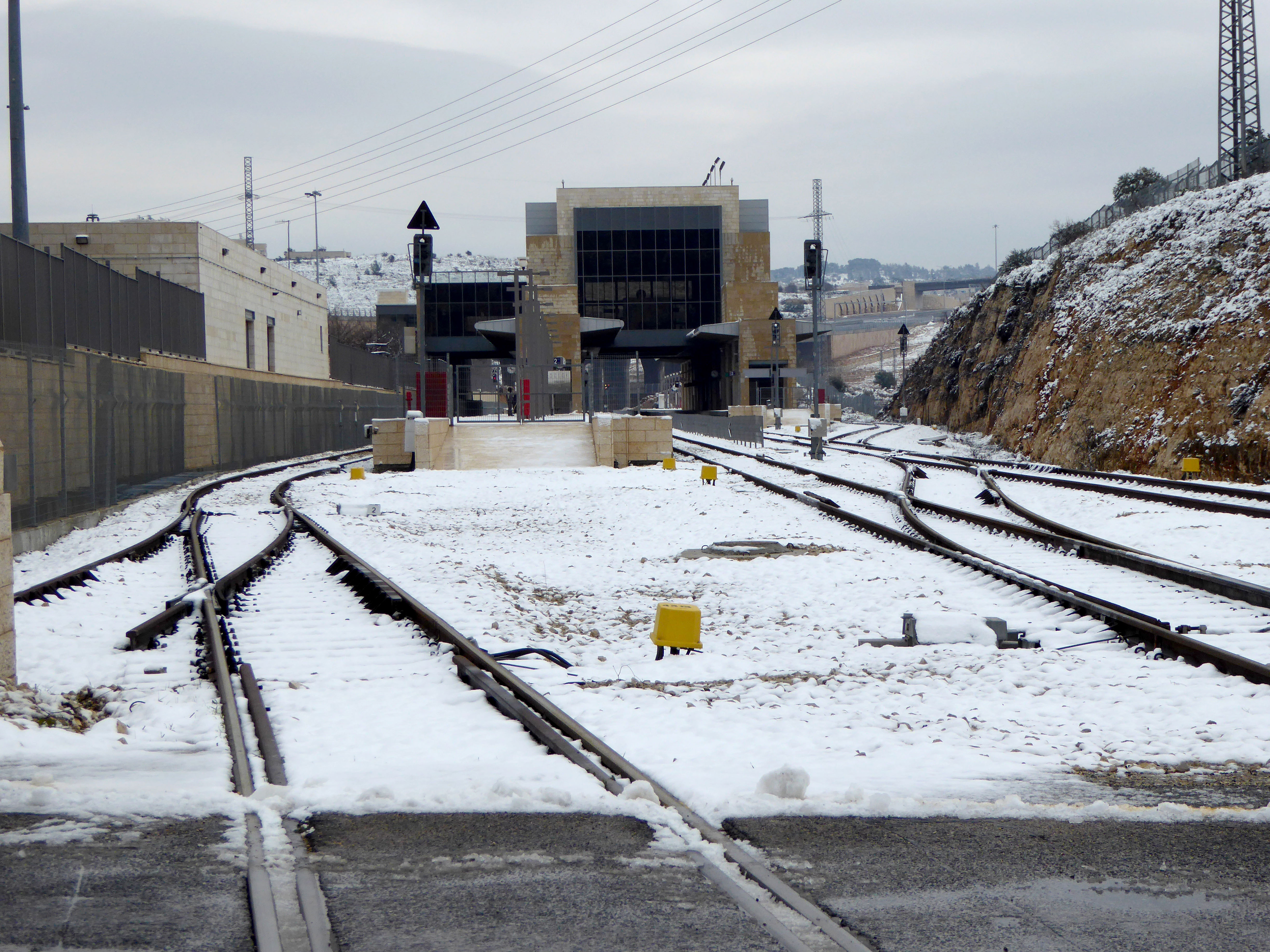
Malha railway station in snow
