= Paatei Modi'in railway station =

Railway station in Israel

Paatei Modi'in פאתי מודיעין
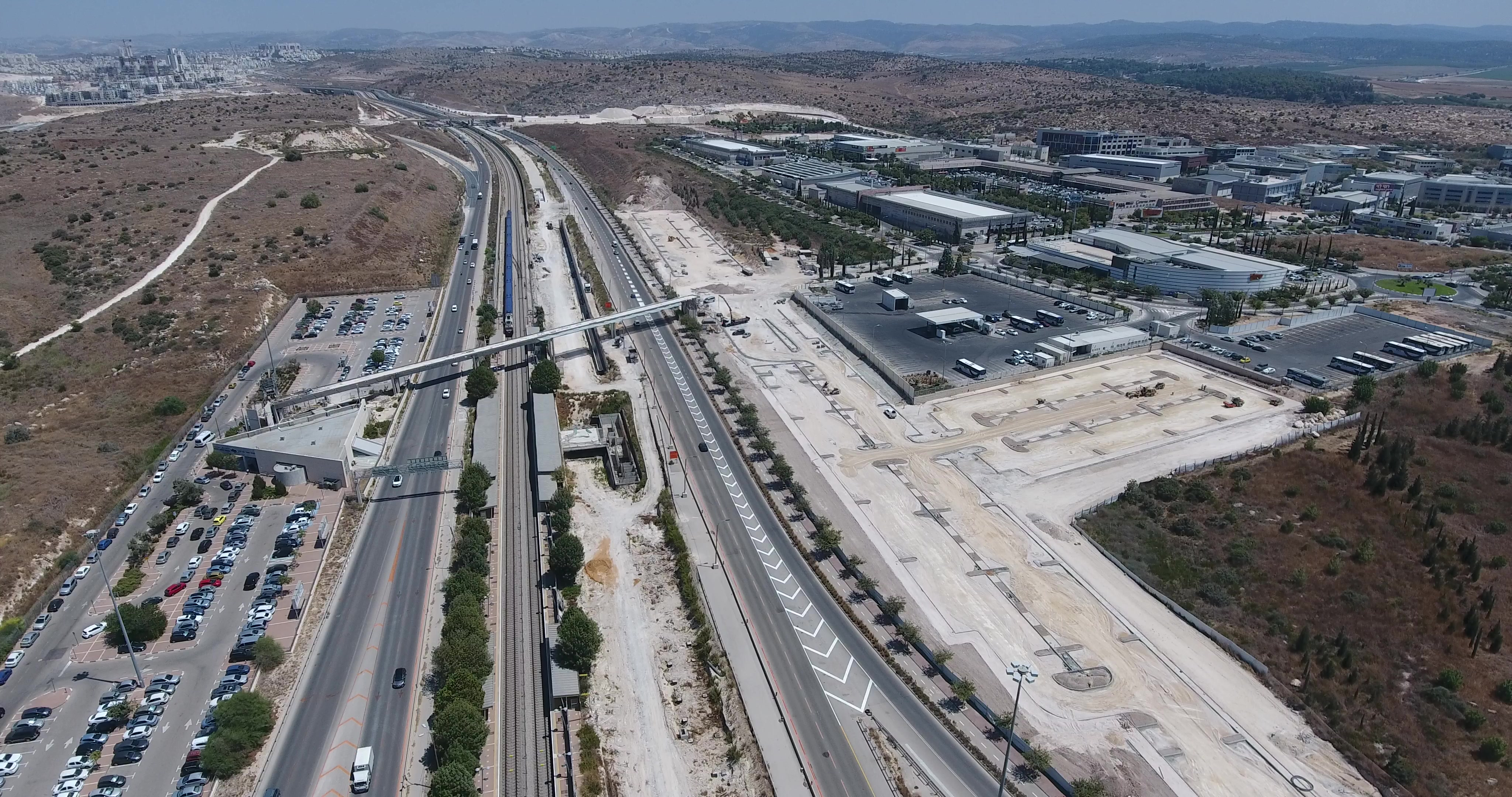
- Paatei Modi'in railway station, on the left

General information
- Location: Modi'in, Israel
- Coordinates: 31°53′37″N 34°57′39″E
- Platforms: 4
- Tracks: 4

Construction
- Parking: yes

History
- Opened: 9 January 2007; 19 years ago
- Electrified: 31 March 2022; 4 years ago

Passengers
- 2019: 391,832
- Rank: 56 out of 68

Services
Preceding station	Israel Railways	Following station
Ben Gurion Airport towards Nahariya	Nahariya–Modi'in	Modi'in–Center Terminus
Jerusalem–Yitzhak Navon Terminus	Jerusalem–Modi'in	Modi'in–Center Terminus
Route map
- Israel Rail Lines Map
Location

Paatei Modi'in railway station (Hebrew: תחנת הרכבת פאתי מודיעין, Tahanat HaRakevet Paatei Modi'in [Modi'in outskirts]) is the next-to-last station on the Nahariya-Modi'in Israel Railways line, serving the residents of Modi'in. It was opened in September 2007. It served as the final stop on the line until April 2008, when service was inaugurated to the Modi'in Central station.

Between 2020 and 2022, the original southern side platform was converted to an island platform and a new southern side platform was constructed. The new platforms serve trains originating from or headed to Jerusalem–Navon railway station.

== Station layout ==
Platform numbers increase in a North-to-South direction

Side platform
Platform 1	Nahariya–Modi'in trains toward Modi'in–Center (Terminus) →
Platform 2	← Nahariya–Modi'in trains toward Nahariya (Ben Gurion Airport)
Island platform
Platform 3	Jerusalem–Modi'in trains toward Modi'in–Center (Terminus) →
Platform 4	← Jerusalem–Modi'in trains toward Jerusalem–Yitzhak Navon (Terminus)
Side platform
