= Jerusalem–Yitzhak Navon railway station =

Train station located in Jerusalem, Israel

Jerusalem–Yitzhak Navon ירושלים – יצחק נבון
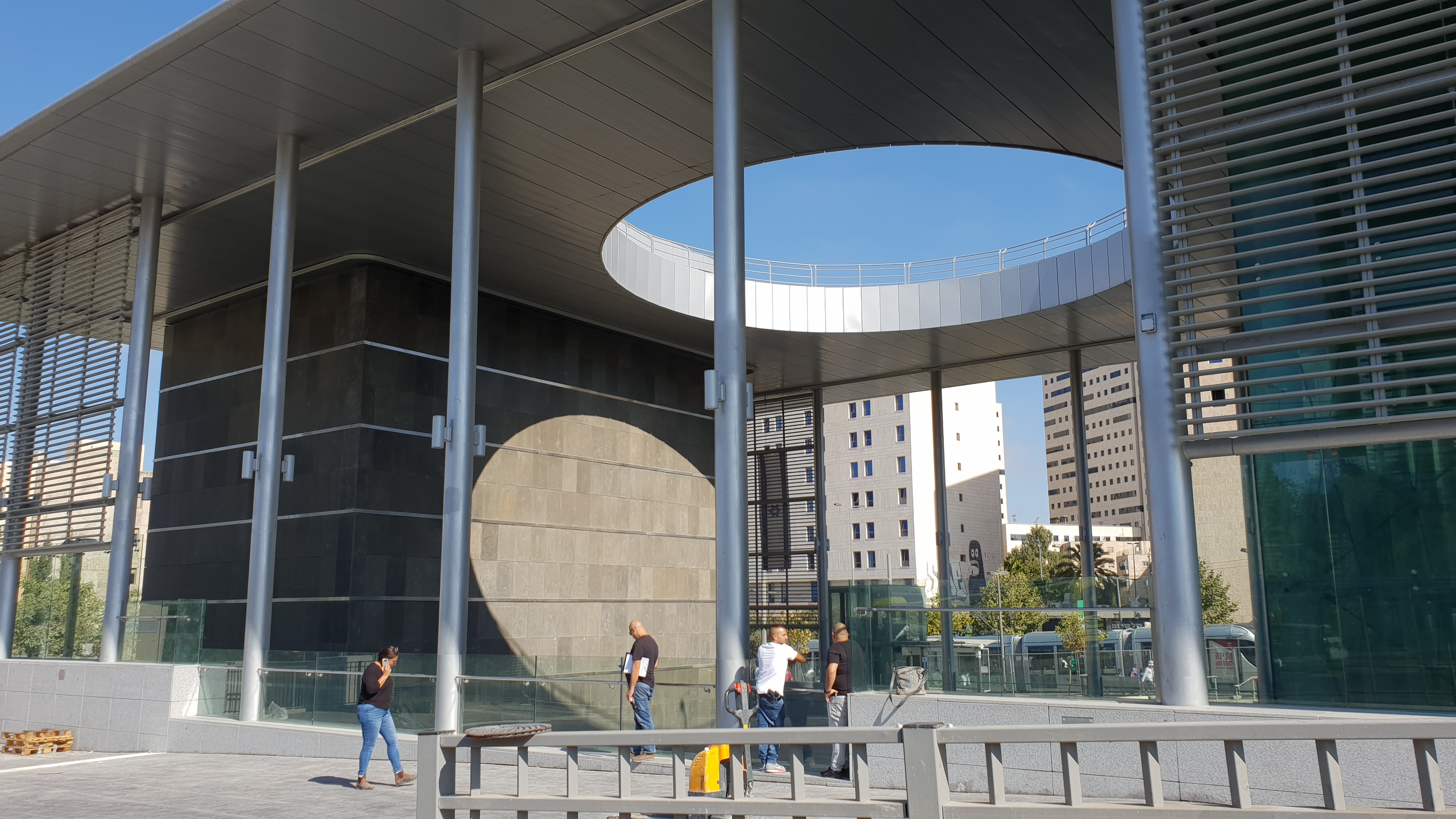
- Surface vestibule

General information
- Location: 6 Shazar Avenue, Jerusalem
- Coordinates: 31.788219°N 35.202439°E
- Operator: Israel Railways
- Line: Tel Aviv–Jerusalem railway
- Platforms: 2
- Tracks: 4
- Connections: Jerusalem Central Bus Station, Jerusalem Light Rail

Construction
- Structure type: Deep-level pylon three-vault station
- Depth: 80 metres (260 ft)
- Accessible: Yes
- Architect: Barchana Architects
- Architectural style: Neo-futurism

Other information
- Website: rail.co.il

History
- Opened: 25 September 2018; 8 years ago
- Electrified: at opening

Passengers
- 2020: 1,651,659
- Rank: 5 out of 68
Location

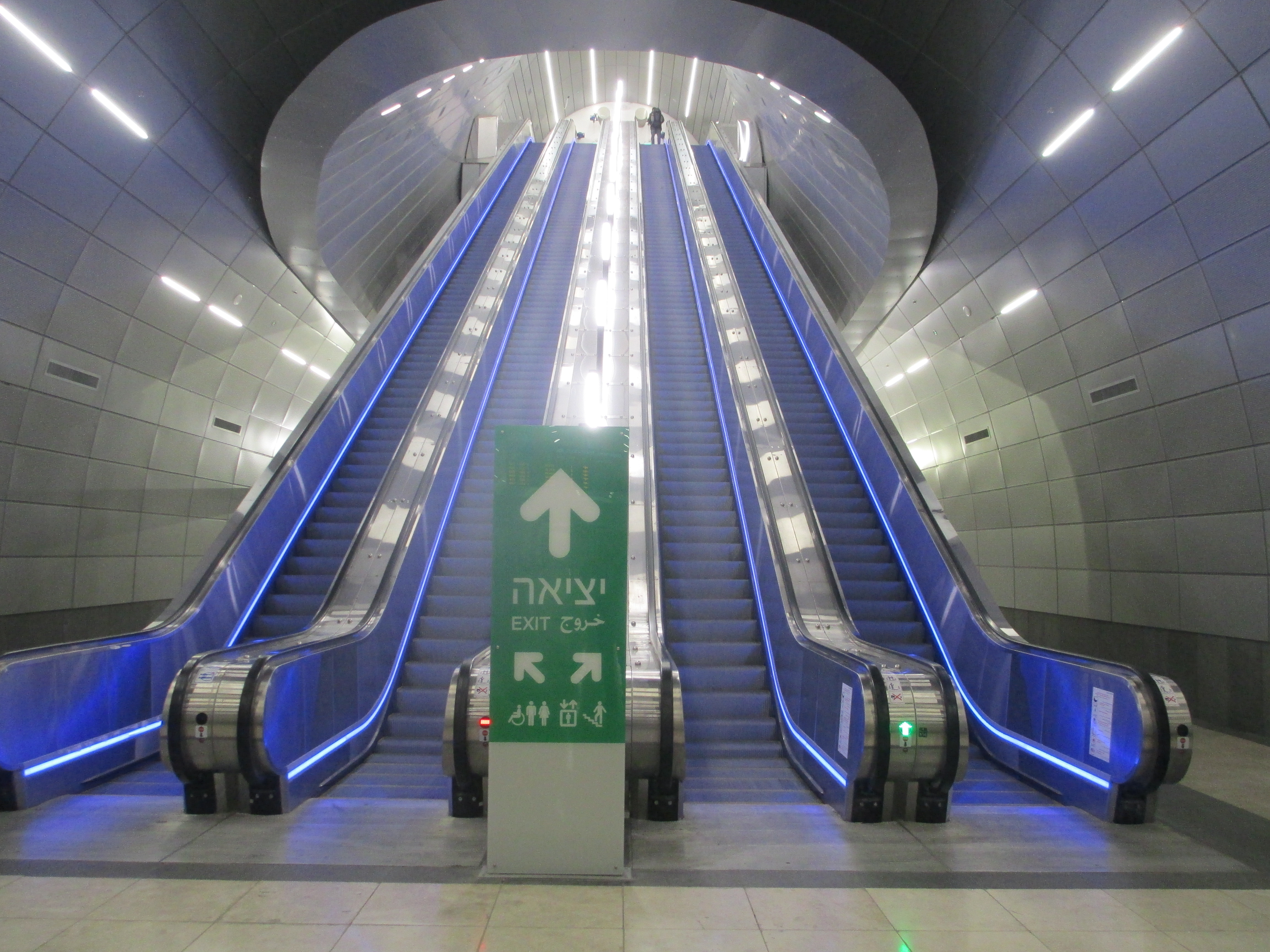
Escalators in the central vault

Jerusalem–Yitzhak Navon Railway Station (Hebrew: תחנת הרכבת ירושלים – יצחק נבון, Tahanat HaRakevet Yerushalaim–Yitzhak Navon; Arabic: محطة أورشليم – يتسحاق ناڤون), originally named Jerusalem–HaUma railway station, is an Israel Railways passenger terminal in Jerusalem, located at 6 Shazar Avenue.

The station is the eastern terminus of the Tel Aviv–Jerusalem railway. It is the world's deepest heavy-rail passenger station, with its platforms extending down to 80 metres (260 ft) below street level. At the time of its opening, it was the fourth deepest underground station in the world and the deepest underground station outside the former Soviet Union; it is currently the sixth-deepest in the world, and the deepest in West Asia. (Note: Jerusalem–Yitzhak Navon's depth is surpassed by: Hongyancun station of Chongqing Rail Transit, 116 metres (381 ft); Arsenalna station of the Kyiv Metro, 110 metres (360 ft) below ground; Hongtudi station of Chongqing Rail Transit, 94 metres (308 ft) below ground; Admiralteyskaya station of the Saint Petersburg Metro, 86 metres (282 ft) below ground; Park Pobedy station of the Moscow Metro, 84 metres (276 ft) below ground) It is located across from Binyanei HaUma and constitutes part of a major public transportation hub, being situated adjacent to the Jerusalem Central Bus Station as well as next to a station serving current and future lines of the Jerusalem Light Rail.

The station is named after Jerusalem native Yitzhak Navon, the fifth President of Israel.

== History ==
Construction of the station began in 2007 and was completed in 2018 at a cost of about NIS 500 million (appx. US$140 million).

2,674,840 passengers boarded or disembarked at the station in 2019, making it the 16th busiest station in the country overall at the time. As electrification works progressed northwards along the line, direct services from Tel Aviv were made possible without the need for a transfer at Ben-Gurion Airport and as a result the station's ridership rankings rose further – making it the fifth-busiest railway station in the country and the busiest outside of Tel Aviv (immediately above the previous holder of this title, Haifa Hof HaCarmel) with 1,651,659 passengers boarding or disembarking in 2020.

In 2021, 3,598,443 passengers embarked and disembarked, not only surpassing the (2019) pre-COVID traffic numbers, but also making Navon station the fourth-busiest in the network, above Tel Aviv University.

In 2022, Navon Station reached a ridership of 6,536,393, nearly double that of the previous year, placing it behind only the Savidor Central and HaShalom stations in central Tel Aviv. 2022 also marked the opening of a second line served by the station, connecting Jerusalem with Modi'in, as well as the beginning of nighttime services; initially only between Jerusalem and Tel Aviv Savidor, with a stop at Ben Gurion Airport, these services were extended in 2023 to stop at Herzliya, Netanya, Hadera and Binyamina, continuing well north of the daytime services (which still terminate at Herzliya).

== Station structure ==
Due to the constraints of building the Tel Aviv–Jerusalem railway in a grade suitable for carrying passengers, the station platforms had to be built 80 metres (260 ft) below street level, at the end of a tunnel leading to the railroad bridge over Emeq HaArazim.

The underground portion of the station is built as a pylon tri-vault. The side vaults each host one of the two island platforms, and are linked by three pairs of overpasses to the central vault. The length of the platforms is 300 metres (980 ft), and the temperature inside remains consistent year-round.

The central vault itself contains the escalators, high-speed elevators and stairways leading up to the surface vestibule 60 metres (200 ft) above, where the station offices, ticket offices, station café and other services are located.

The surface vestibule is located at an elevation of 815 metres (2,674 ft), with most of the station's 60,000 square metres (650,000 sq ft) of floorspace located underground. The lion's share of the underground portion is home to vast logistical and operating areas. The station can double as a shelter in case of a conventional, biological or chemical attack, being able to provide refuge for 5,000 people. Due to the station's profound depth, its underground portion has large ventilation systems pulling in air directly from the surface level, which are also capable of quickly sucking out air in the event of a fire.

== Future plans ==
As of 2022, additional surface entrances from the east and south are being added as part of a major urban re-development plan being carried out in the vicinity of the station.

There is a proposed plan to extend the railway from the station towards the Jerusalem–Malha railway station, via a new underground station in central Jerusalem and another underneath the historic Jerusalem-Khan train station.

== Station layout ==
Platform numbers increase in a North-to-South direction

+1	Street level	Light Rail, buses
+1	Light Rail station	Central Bus Station entrance
+1	Light Rail station	Side platform
+1	Light Rail station	Southbound	← L1 toward Hadassah Ein Kerem (Kiryat Moshe)
+1	Light Rail station	Northbound	L1 toward Neve Yaakov (Ha-Turim) →
+1	Light Rail station	Side platform
+1	Light Rail station	Navon Station entrance
+1	Light Rail station	Side platform
+1	Light Rail station	Southbound	←L3 toward Malha (Manahat) (Government Complex)
+1	Light Rail station	Northbound	L3 toward Damascus Gate (HaTurim) →
+1	Light Rail station	Side platform
0	Entrance level	Exterior plaza, security checkpoint, ticket machines, underpass to Central Bus Station
-1	Passenger hall	Fare control, ticket machines, station master's office, synagogue, toilets
-2	Passage to platforms	Children's play area, station café, toilets
-3	Platforms	Platform 1	← Hadera–Jerusalem trains toward Netanya or Hadera West (Ben Gurion Airport) ← Night Train toward Herzliya (Ben Gurion Airport)
-3	Platforms	Island platform
-3	Platforms	Platform 2	← Hadera–Jerusalem trains toward Netanya or Hadera West (Ben Gurion Airport) ← Night Train toward Herzliya (Ben Gurion Airport)
-3	Platforms	Platform 3	← Hadera–Jerusalem trains toward Netanya or Hadera West (Ben Gurion Airport)
-3	Platforms	Island platform
-3	Platforms	Platform 4	← Jerusalem–Modi'in trains toward Modi'in–Center (Paatei Modi'in)

== Ridership ==
Passengers boarding and disembarking by year
Year	Passengers	Rank	Source
2022	6,536,393 (▲2,937,950)	3 of 66 (▲1)	2022 Freedom of Information Law Annual Report
2021	3,598,443 (▲1,946,784)	4 of 66 (▲1)	2021 Freedom of Information Law Annual Report
2020	1,651,659 (▼1,023,181)	5 of 68 (▲11)	2020 Freedom of Information Law Annual Report
2019	2,674,840	16 of 68	2019 Freedom of Information Law Annual Report

== Station lines ==
Preceding station	Israel Railways	Following station
Terminus	Jerusalem–Modi'in	Paatei Modi'in towards Modi'in–Center
Ben Gurion Airport towards Herzliya	Herzliya–Jerusalem	Terminus
Ben Gurion Airport towards Herzliya	Night Train Herzliya–Jerusalem	Terminus

== See also ==
- Transportation in Israel
- Jerusalem–Malha railway station
