= Jerusalem–Central railway station =

Railway station in Jerusalem, Israel

Jerusalem–Central ירושלים – מרכז أورشليم – مركز

General information
- Location: Jaffa Street, Jerusalem
- Coordinates: 31.7838°N 35.2166°E
- Operator: Israel Railways
- Line: Tel Aviv–Jerusalem railway
- Platforms: 2
- Tracks: 4
- Train operators: Israel Railways
- Connections: Jerusalem Light Rail

Construction
- Structure type: Deep-level pylon two-vault station
- Depth: 75 metres (246 ft)
- Accessible: Yes
Location

Jerusalem–Central railway station (Hebrew: תחנת הרכבת ירושלים – מרכז, Tahanat HaRakevet Yerushalayim–Merkaz; Arabic: محطة أورشليم – مركز) is a proposed railway station in Jerusalem.

== Planning ==
The new Tel Aviv–Jerusalem railway reaches as far as Jerusalem–Yitzhak Navon station located 80m underground at the northwest entrance to Jerusalem. Several proposals have suggested extending this line to the Jerusalem city center and from there possibly to the Western Wall in the Old City.

Initial plans called for a central Jerusalem station at the intersection of King George and Jaffa streets, under the "Pillars Building" (which from 1932 until the 1960s served as Jerusalem's central bus station) and its parking lot. This location would provide transfers to the Red Line and future Blue Line of the Jerusalem Light Rail. The station would be located 50m underground.

In July 2018 a slightly different location was proposed, 130 m to the northwest, at the future "Benin Compound" to be built near the Davidka Square, located approximately 1.4 km southeast of Navon railway station. Israel Railways submitted a legal objection asking that the compound's plan be modified to allow for an underground train station. Since this location is at a higher elevation than the Pillars Building, the station would be deeper, 75m below ground level and nearly as deep as Navon station. From this future station the line is expected to continue underground to the southeast in the direction of the Old City, connecting to a large, shallow-underground station to be built nearby the historical Jerusalem railway station.

In 2020 the government of Israel approved spending NIS 90 million to purchase rights in the future compound to permit for the construction of the station. In November 2021 detailed plans for the station were revealed; according to them, the main entrance will be built under the Benin Compound, but a secondary entrance will also be built under the Pillars Building. Therefore, the station's depth will be 78m below ground level from the Benin compound entrance, and 71m below ground level from the Pillars building. The line's final route was also confirmed—it will pass via an underground station underneath the historical Jerusalem–Khan railway station, and emerge from the ground to connect to the surface-level Jerusalem–Malha railway station.

Like the existing Navon and Malha stations, as well as the planned revived Khan station, Jerusalem-Central will have two island platforms servicing four tracks. Each Island platform will be built in a vault, and both vaults will be linked by direct overpasses to escalators and elevators leading to the surface; as opposed to Jerusalem-Navon's structure, where the surface escalators and elevators only lead to a central vault, from which overpasses extend to the platforms.
