= Modi'in–Center railway station =

Rail station in Modi'in, Israel

Modi'in–Center מודיעין – מרכז
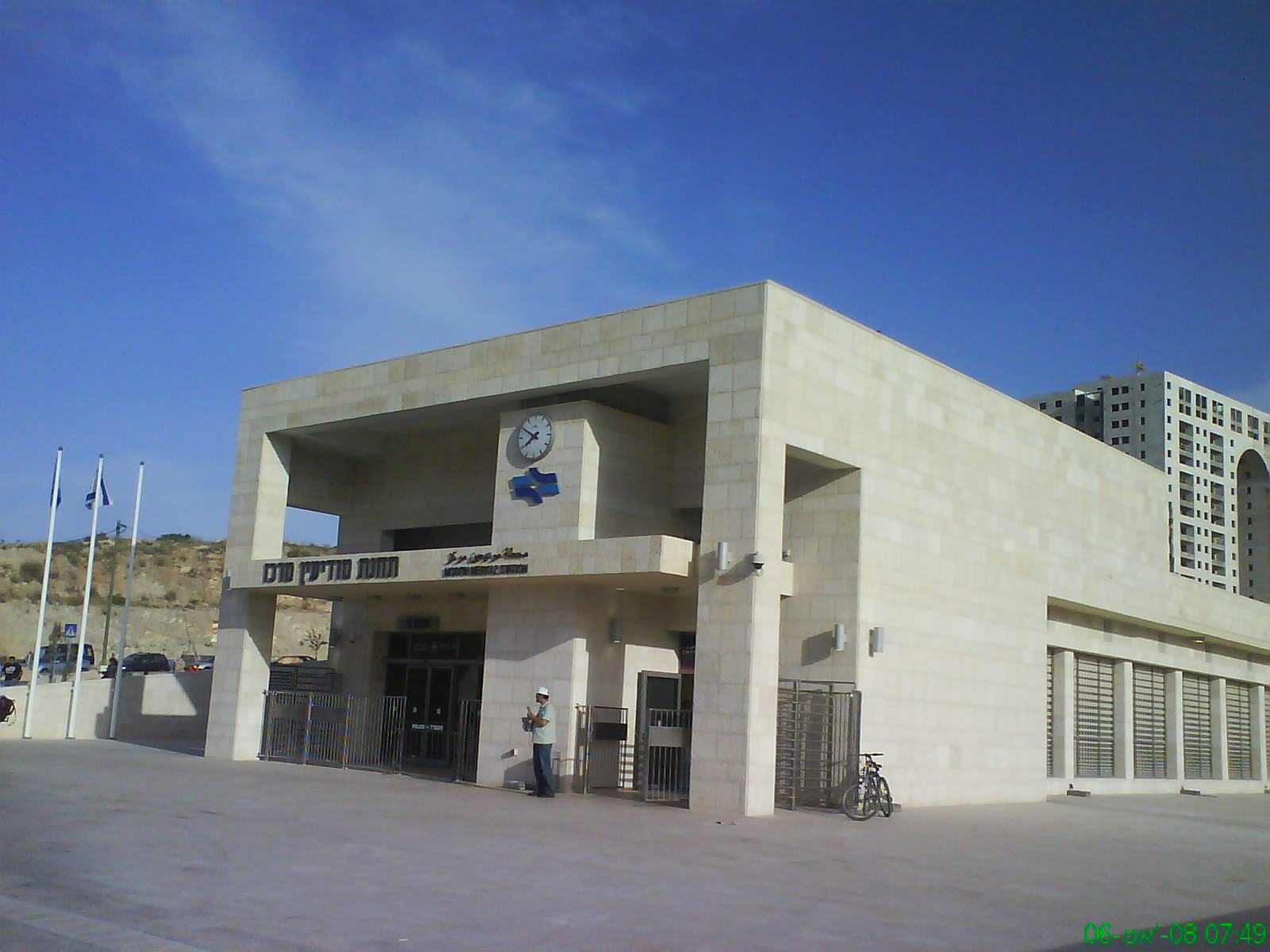

General information
- Location: Modi'in, Israel
- Coordinates: 31°54′03″N 35°00′21″E
- Line: 1
- Platforms: 2
- Tracks: 4

Construction
- Structure type: underground
- Platform levels: 3
- Parking: no

History
- Opened: 1 April 2008; 18 years ago
- Electrified: 31 March 2022; 4 years ago

Passengers
- 2019: 1,711,198
- Rank: 29 out of 68

Services
Preceding station	Israel Railways	Following station
Paatei Modi'in towards Nahariya	Nahariya–Modi'in	Terminus
Paatei Modi'in towards Jerusalem–Yitzhak Navon	Jerusalem–Modi'in	Terminus
Route map
- Israel Rail Lines Map
Location

Modi'in–Center railway station (Hebrew: תחנת הרכבת מודיעין – מרכז, Tahanat HaRakevet Modi'in Merkaz) is an Israel Railways passenger terminal and one of two stations serving Modi'in (the other being Paatei Modi'in). It is the terminus of the Nahariya-Modi'in line, with service to the airport, Tel Aviv, Haifa, and Akko. It became operational on 1 April 2008. On 31 March 2022, an electric link to Jerusalem was established.

Modi'in Central is the first rail station in Israel that is completely underground. Covering an area of approximately 7,000 square meters (75,000 sq ft), it was the largest railway station in Israel until the opening of the Jerusalem–Yitzhak Navon railway station, which is eight times larger.

== Gallery ==
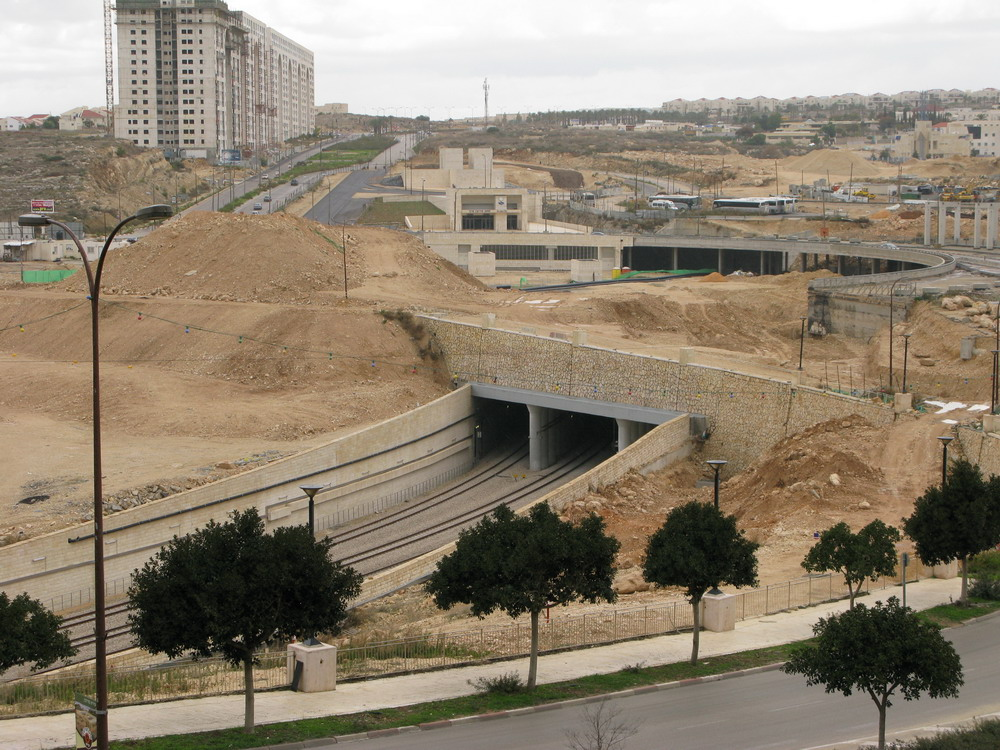
Tracks leading towards the station. The station is in the background.

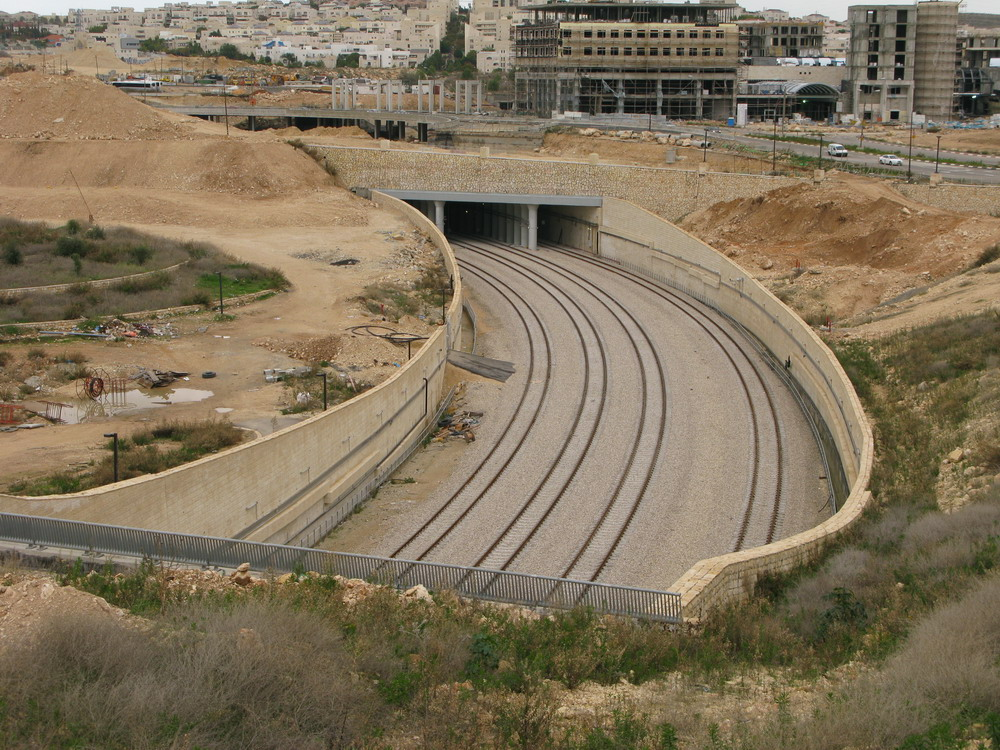
Another view of the tracks

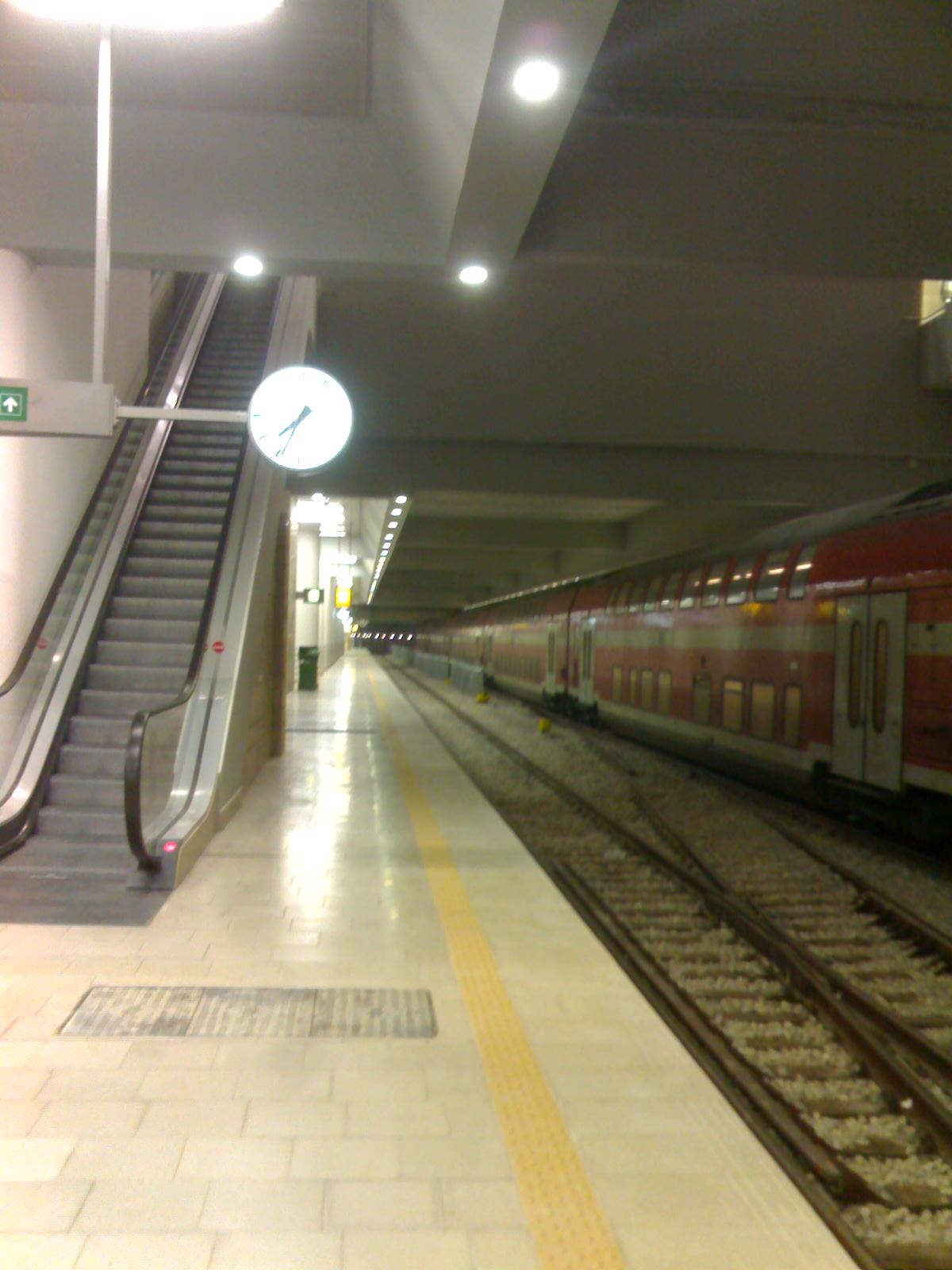
Inside the station
