= Jaffa =

Ancient port and city in Tel Aviv, Israel

Coordinates: 32°03′08″N 34°45′11″E

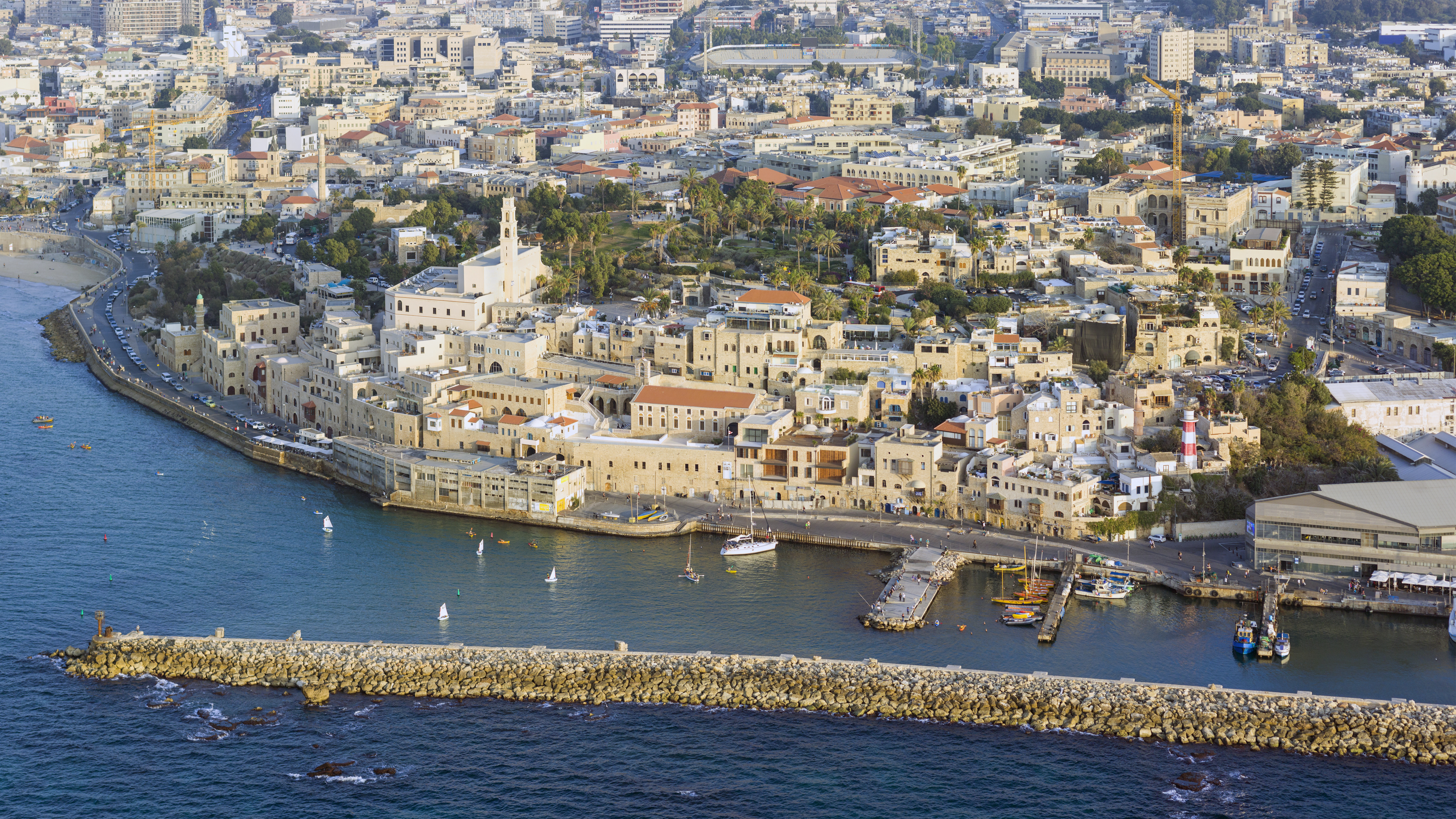
Aerial view of old Jaffa

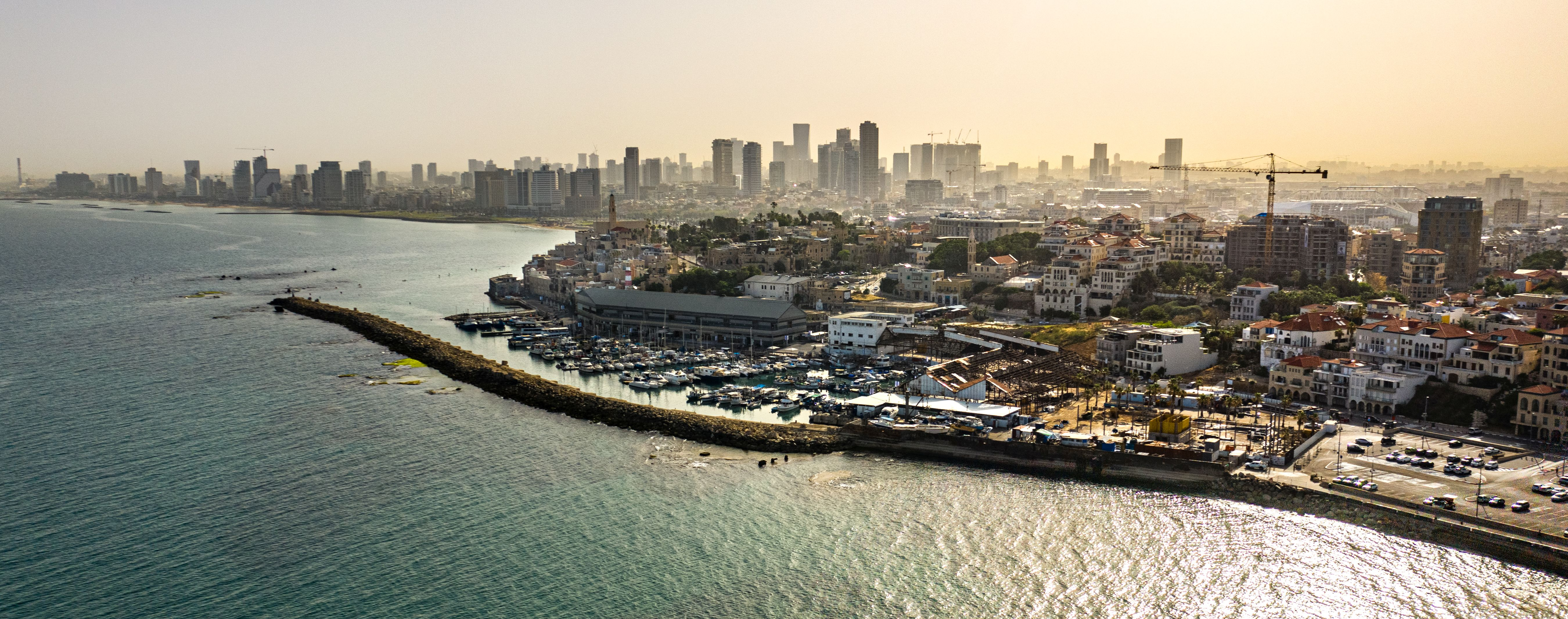
Aerial view of old Jaffa and port with Tel Aviv behind

Jaffa (Hebrew: יָפוֹ, romanised: Yāfō, pronounced [jaˈfo]; Arabic: يَافَا, romanised: Yāfā, pronounced [ˈjaːfaː]), also called Japho, Joppa or Joppe in English, is an ancient Levantine port city which is part of Tel Aviv-Yafo, Israel, located in its southern part. The city sits atop a naturally elevated outcrop on the Mediterranean coastline.

Excavations at Jaffa indicate that the city was settled as early as the Early Bronze Age. The city is referenced in several ancient Egyptian and Assyrian documents. Biblically, Jaffa is noted as one of the boundaries of the tribe of Dan and as a port through which Lebanese cedars were imported for the construction of the Temple in Jerusalem. This was done under the rule of the Hebrew King Solomon, prior to the Ptolemies conquering the city under Alexander the Great. Under Persian rule, Jaffa was given to the Phoenicians. The city features in the biblical story of Jonah and the Greek legend of Andromeda. Later, the city served as the major port of Hasmonean Judea. However, its importance declined during the Roman period due to the construction of Caesarea.

Jaffa was contested during the Crusades, when it presided over the County of Jaffa and Ascalon. It is associated with the 1192 Battle of Jaffa and subsequent Treaty of Jaffa, a truce between Richard the Lionheart and Saladin, as well as a later 1229 peace treaty. In 1799, Napoleon also sacked the town in the Siege of Jaffa, and in the First World War the British took the city in the 1917 Battle of Jaffa, and under their watch, as part of Mandatory Palestine, ethnic tensions culminated in the 1921 Jaffa riots.

As an Arab majority city in the Ottoman era, Jaffa became known starting from the 19th century for its expansive orchards and fruits, including its namesake Jaffa orange. It was also a Palestinian hub for journalism in Mandatory Palestine in the 20th century, where Falastin and Al-Difa' newspapers were established. After the 1948 Palestine War, most of its Arab population fled or were expelled, and the city became part of then newly established state of Israel, and was unified into a single municipality with Tel Aviv in 1950. Today, Jaffa is one of Israel's mixed cities, with approximately 37% of the city being Arab.

== Etymology ==
The town was mentioned in Egyptian sources and the Amarna letters as Yapu. Mythology says that it is named for Yafet (Japheth), one of the sons of Noah, the one who built it after the Flood. The Hellenist tradition links the name to Iopeia, or Cassiopeia, mother of Andromeda. An outcropping of rocks near the harbour is reputed to have been the place where Andromeda was rescued by Perseus. Pliny the Elder associated the name with Iopa, daughter of Aeolus, god of the wind. The medieval Arab geographer al-Muqaddasi referred to it as Yaffa.

== History ==
Ancient Jaffa was built on a 40 metres (130 ft) high kurkar sandstone ridge, with a broad view of the coastline, giving it a strategic importance in military history. The tell of Jaffa, created through the accumulation of debris and landfill over the centuries, made the hill even higher.

=== Early Bronze Age ===
==== Early Bronze I ====
Jaffa was settled as early as the Early Bronze Age I period (4th millennium BCE). This is evidenced by numerous potsherds identified in excavations. The scarcity of material from this period is likely due to early remains being deeply buried beneath later occupational layers.

==== Early Bronze III ====
While no direct archaeological have been found, some scholars have hypothesised that during the Early Bronze Age III (c. 2850–2400 BCE), Jaffa served as a natural harbour in the developing trade route between the Old Kingdom of Egypt and the city of Byblos (in present-day Lebanon).

=== Middle Bronze Age ===
==== Middle Bronze II ====
The earliest remains of an actual settlement date to the 18th century BCE. Jaffa formed part of a broader pattern of settlements, comprising small villages, fortresses, and watchtowers, established in the central coastal plain during this period. These include sites such as Tel Aphek, Tel Gerisa, and Yavne-Yam. Excavations in Areas B–D on the northern slope of the mound revealed fortifications, including an earthen rampart that likely supported a mudbrick superstructure, which has not survived. Additional fortification elements, including traces of a gate dated to the 17th–16th centuries BCE, were uncovered in Area A on the eastern slope. These features are characteristic of Middle Bronze Age sites in the Levant. Middle Bronze Age Jaffa was relatively modest in scale, covering approximately three hectares, but nonetheless occupied a strategic position along maritime trade routes connecting the Levant, Egypt, and Cyprus. Evidence of this trade includes imported Middle Cypriot pottery types, such as Black-on-Red Ware and White-Painted Ware, as well as Egyptian Hyksos scarabs discovered at the site.

=== Late Bronze Age ===
==== Egyptian period ====
As late as the 15th century BCE Jaffa came under the imperial control of Egypt's New Kingdom. It is listed among the cities conquered by Thutmose III (r. c. 1479 – 1425 BCE) of the Eighteenth Dynasty, whose campaigns in the Levant are generally dated to the late 16th through early 15th centuries BCE. Jaffa likely served as a ḥtm-base—a fortified harbour used to monitor movement along the coast.

Jaffa is mentioned in Papyrus Harris 500, which contains a partially preserved tale known as The Taking of Joppa. The story recounts a Canaanite revolt against Egyptian rule. According to the account, the rebel leader left Jaffa—possibly to acquire supplies—and encountered the Egyptian general Djehuty, who killed him. Djehuty then tricked the remaining rebels by hiding 200 soldiers in sacks, which were transported into the city under the guise of goods. Once inside, the soldiers emerged and captured Jaffa, apparently without a fight. This tale bears a striking resemblance to the later Greek story of the Trojan Horse, as recounted by Homer, although it predates it by at least two centuries. The historicity of the story is questionable, considering its folkloristic character, but scholars have noted it may have conveyed historical memory, echoing Jaffa's importance to the Egyptian rule in the 15th century BCE.

Around 1350 BCE, Jaffa was of strategic importance as attested by the Amarna letters. It served as residence for Egyptian officials and as the administrative centre of the central coastal plain. The site is mentioned under its Egyptian name Yapu, along its royal granaries. During that period, Amarna Letter EA 138 implied that the Pharaoh suggested Rib-Hadda, the king of Byblos to seek refuge in the residence of an Egyptian official named Api. A clay-inscribed letter from the 12th century BCE found at the "Governor's Palace" (Building 1104) at the nearby Tel Aphek, which served as a Royal-agricultural estate, recounts the supply of 12,000 to 15,000 litres of wheat to Jaffa. These were received by a man named Tur-šimati, likely an Egyptian official.

Archaeological investigations in Jaffa have revealed massive fortifications and a monumental gateway from this period, nicknamed "Ramesses Gate", as well as a temple titled the "Lion Temple". Numerous Egyptian artifacts such as scarabs were found, attesting to Egyptian cultural influences.

=== Iron Age ===
==== Early Iron Age (11th–10th centuries BCE) ====
In the Hebrew Bible, Jaffa is depicted as the northernmost Philistine city, bordering the Israelite territories – more specifically those of Tribe of Dan (hence the modern term "Gush Dan" for the centre of the coastal plain). The Israelites did not manage to take Jaffa from the Philistines.

Jaffa is mentioned four times in the Hebrew Bible: as the northernmost Philistine city by the coast, bordering the territory of the Tribe of Dan (Joshua 19:46); as port-of-entry for the cedars of Lebanon for Solomon's Temple (2 Chronicles 2:16); as the place whence the prophet Jonah embarked for Tarshish (Jonah 1:3); and again as port-of-entry for the cedars of Lebanon for the Second Temple of Jerusalem (Ezra 3:7).

==== Late Iron Age (8th century BCE) ====
In the late 8th century BCE, Sennacherib, king of Assyria, recorded conquering Jaffa, along with Beth Dagon, Beneberak and Azor, from their Sidqa, the Philistine king of Ashkelon. This is the only historical mention of Jaffa since the end of the Late Bronze Age in the 12th century BCE, and the late 6th century BCE. The coastal plain from Jaffa to the Mount Carmel was incorporated following Sennacherib's campaigns to the Province of Dor. The construction of the fortified site at Tell Qudadi during that time, at the mouth of the Yarkon River, just north of Jaffa, has led scholars to suggest that Jaffa was a port town of secondary importance during that time.

Archaeological remains from the 8th century are meager, in comparison to those found from the previous Late Bronze Age and subsequent Persian periods. The most significant finds were excavated in Area A on Tel Yafo atop the remains of Late Bronze Age fortifications. These Iron Age remains were severely damaged by levelling and construction during the subsequent Persian period. The finds include remains of walls, which were identified as part of a farmstead built atop Jaffa's mound. Several pits were found nearby, containing pottery vessels used for storage, preparation of food and eating, attesting to the domestic nature of the site.

=== Persian period ===
Jaffa was awarded to Sidon along with Dor and the Sharon plain, as attested in an inscription on the Sarcophagus of Eshmunazar II.

=== Hellenistic period ===
Jaffa is not mentioned in Alexander the Great's coastal campaign, but during the Wars of the Diadochi, Antigonus Monophthalmus captured Jaffa in 315 BCE. Ptolemy I Soter later destroyed it in 312 BCE. Despite this, Jaffa was resettled and became a Ptolemaic mint site in the third century BCE. Archaeological evidence from this period includes a watchtower and numerous stamped amphora handles. Additionally, the city is mentioned in several Zeno papyri. The area was transferred to Seleucid control after the Battle of Paneas in 198 BCE. Together with the other primarily Phoenician-inhabited coastal plain cities of Gaza, Ascalon, Dor, and Acre, Jaffa became highly Hellenised during this period, becoming standard-bearers for the spread of Greek culture in the region.

According to 2 Maccabees 12:3–6, probably in the 163–162 BCE years during the Maccabean revolt, Jaffa's non-Jewish inhabitants invited its Jewish foreign residents onto boats, subsequently sinking them and drowning hundreds. In retaliation, Judas Maccabeus attacked Jaffa, setting the harbour on fire, destroying ships, and killing many inhabitants, though he did not attempt to hold the city. By 147–146 BCE, his brother Jonathan Apphus expelled the garrison of Seleucid king Demetrius II from Jaffa but did not conquer the city. In 143 BCE, Simon Thassi established a garrison in Jaffa, expelled the non-Jewish inhabitants to prevent them from collaborating with the Seleucid commander Tryphon, and fortified the city. During the operations of Antiochus VII Sidetes in Judaea, he demanded the surrender of Jaffa among other cities. Simon negotiated a settlement by agreeing to pay a smaller tribute. Simon's capture of Jaffa is earlier praised in 1 Maccabees because of the city's strategic importance as a port.

In the Hasmonean period, the city was fortified and served as the main port of Judaea. Under Hasmonean king Alexander Jannaeus (103–76 BCE), Jaffa was one of several coastal cities controlled by the Jews, including Straton's Tower, Apollonia, Iamnia, and Gaza. Archaeological evidence from this period is limited but includes remnants of walls, tombs from the early first century BCE, and hoards of coins. Incidents of piracy before the Roman conquest are mentioned by Josephus, who accused Aristobulus of instigating raids and acts of piracy. These claims are echoed by Diodorus and Strabo, though their reliability is debated, given the term leistai (pirates) was often used pejoratively in this period.

=== Roman period ===
Jaffa was annexed to Syria by Pompey but later restored to Judaea by Julius Caesar, reaffirming Jewish access to the sea through their traditional port. In 39 BCE, Herod captured Jaffa from Antigonus, though control fluctuated until Octavian returned it to Herod after the defeat of Antony and Cleopatra. After Herod's death, Jaffa, along with Strato's Tower (Caesarea), Sebaste, and Jerusalem, was assigned to Archelaus's ethnarchy in Judaea. The construction of Herod's superior harbour at Caesarea diminished Jaffa's regional importance.

Josephus's accounts indicate that Jaffa had city status, administering surrounding districts, reflecting continued regional significance. However, he adds that the harbour at Jaffa was inferior to that of Caesarea. The population of the city during this period was predominantly Jewish. Strabo, writing in the early 1st century CE, describes Jaffa as a location from which it is possible to see Jerusalem, the capital of the Jews, and writes that the Jews used it as their naval arsenal when they descended to the sea. Excavations suggest urban expansion during the Hellenistic period under Ptolemaic rule, followed by contraction under Seleucid and early Roman rule, and renewed expansion later in the Roman and Byzantine periods. Archaeological remains from the Roman period are mainly found near the harbour, including rich finds like terra sigillata, a bread or cheese stamp, and coins.

In the early stages of the First Jewish–Roman War in 66 CE, Cestius Gallus sent forces to Jaffa, where the city was destroyed and its inhabitants indiscriminately killed. Josephus writes that 8,400 inhabitants were massacred. Subsequently, the city was resettled by Jews expelled from neighbouring regions, who used it to disrupt maritime commerce between Egypt and Syria. As the Romans, led by Vespasian, approached Jaffa, those Jews fled to sea but were devastated by a storm, killing 4,200 people. Those who reached shore were killed by the Romans, who subsequently destroyed Jaffa again and stationed troops to prevent its reuse as a pirate base. In the 3rd century CE, Jaffa was known by the name Flavia Ioppe, potentially indicating an honorary designation under Flavian rule.

=== Byzantine period ===
Despite the devastation and loss of life during the revolt, Jaffa maintained a Jewish population. Inscriptions from the early 2nd century indicate Jewish involvement in local governance. Further evidence includes Jewish epitaphs dating from the 3rd to 6th centuries, some from members of the diaspora, along with references in Talmudic sources to scholars associated with Jaffa. Archaeological findings from the 2nd and 3rd centuries reveal structures destroyed by fire, possibly linked to regional unrest.

During the first centuries of Christianity, Jaffa was a fairly unimportant Roman and Byzantine locality, which only in the 5th century became a bishopric. The new religion arrived in Jaffa relatively late, not appearing in historical records until the Council of Ephesus in 431 CE. A very small number of its Greek or Latin bishops are known. Early Christian texts describe Jaffa as a modest settlement, with varying accounts of its prosperity and state of preservation.

=== Religious narratives ===
The New Testament account of Saint Peter bringing back to life the widow Dorcas (recorded in Acts of the Apostles, 9:36–42), takes place in Jaffa, then called in Greek Ἰόππη (Latinised as Joppa). Acts 10:10–23 relates that, while Peter was in Jaffa, he had a vision of a large sheet filled with "clean" and "unclean" animals being lowered from heaven, together with a message from the Holy Spirit telling him to accompany several messengers to Cornelius in Caesarea Maritima. Peter retells the story of his vision in Acts 11:4–17, explaining how he had come to preach Christianity to the gentiles.

In Midrash Tanna'im in its chapter Deuteronomy 33:19, reference is made to Jose ben Halafta (2nd century) traveling through Jaffa. Jaffa seems to have attracted serious Jewish scholars in the 4th and 5th century. The Jerusalem Talmud (compiled 4th and 5th century) in Moed Ketan references Rabi Akha bar Khanina of Jaffa; and in Pesachim chapter 1 refers to Rabi Pinchas ben Yair of Jaffa. The Babylonian Talmud (compiled 5th century) in Megillah 16b mentions Rav Adda Demin of Jaffa. Leviticus Rabbah (compiled between 5th and 7th century) mentions Rav Nachman of Jaffa. The Pesikta Rabbati (written in the 9th century) in chapter 17 mentions R. Tanchum of Jaffa. Several streets and alleys of the Jaffa Flea Market area are named after these scholars.

=== Early Islamic period ===
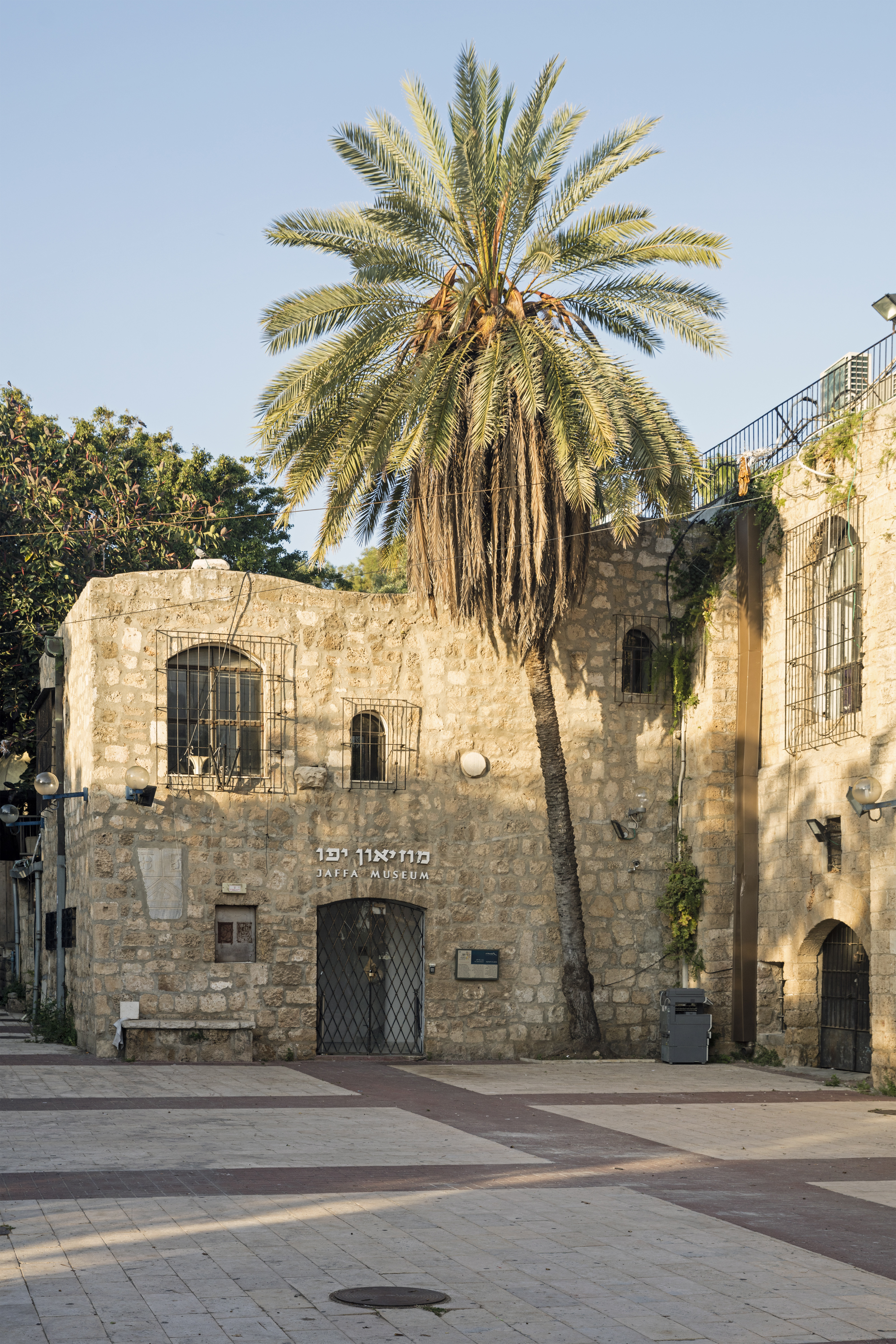
Jaffa Museum in Old Saraya building, in the historical Old Jaffa region

In 636 Jaffa was conquered by Arabs. Under Islamic rule, it served as a port of Ramla, then the provincial capital.

Al-Muqaddasi (c. 945/946 – 991) described Yafah as "lying on the sea, is but a small town, although the emporium of Palestine and the port of Ar-Ramlah. It is protected by a strong wall with iron gates, and the sea-gates also are of iron. The mosque is pleasant to the eye, and overlooks the sea. The harbour is excellent".

=== Crusader and Ayyubid periods ===
Jaffa was captured in June 1099 during the First Crusade, and was the centre of the County of Jaffa and Ascalon, one of the vassals of the Kingdom of Jerusalem. One of its counts, John of Ibelin, wrote the principal book of the Assizes of the Kingdom of Jerusalem.

Saladin conquered Jaffa in 1187. The city surrendered to King Richard the Lionheart on 10 September 1191, three days after the Battle of Arsuf. Despite efforts by Saladin to reoccupy the city in the July 1192 Battle of Jaffa, the city remained in the hands of the Crusaders. On 2 September 1192, the Treaty of Jaffa was formally signed, guaranteeing a three-year truce between the two armies.

In 1229, Frederick II signed a ten-year truce in a new Treaty of Jaffa. He fortified the castle of Jaffa and had two inscriptions carved into city wall, one Latin and the other Arabic. The inscription, deciphered in 2011, describes him as the "Holy Roman Emperor" and bears the date "1229 of the Incarnation of our Lord Jesus the Messiah."

=== Mamluk period ===
In March 1268, Baibars, the sultan of the Egyptian Mamluks, conquered Jaffa simultaneously with conquering Antioch. Baibars's goal was to conquer Christian crusader strongholds. An inscription from the White Mosque of Ramla, today visible in the Great Mosque of Gaza, commemorates the event:

In the name of God the Merciful, the Compassionate, ... gave power to his servant ...who has trust in him ... who fights for Him and defends the faith of His Prophet ... Sultan of Islam and the Muslims, Baybars ... who came out with his victorious army on the 10th of the month of Rajab from the land of Egypt, resolved to carry out jihad and combat the intransigent infidels. He camped in the port city of Jaffa in the morning and conquered it, by God's will, in the third hour of that day. Then he ordered the erection of the dome over the blessed minaret, as well as the gate of this mosque ... in the year 666 of the Hijra [1268 CE]. May God have mercy upon him and upon all Muslims.

Abu'l-Fida (1273–1331), writing in 1321, described "Yafa, in Filastin" as "a small but very pleasant town lying on the sea-shore. It has a celebrated harbour. The town of Yafa is well fortified. Its markets are much frequented, and many merchants ply their trades here. There is a large harbour frequented by all the ships coming to Filastin, and from it they set sail to all lands. Between it and Ar Ramlah the distance is 6 miles, and it lies west of Ar Ramlah."

In 1432, Bertrandon de la Broquière observed that Jaffa was in ruins, with only a few tents standing. He wrote: "At Jaffa, the pardons commence for pilgrims to the Holy Land ... at present, it is entirely destroyed, having only a few tents covered with reeds, where pilgrims seek shelter from the heat of the sun. The sea enters the town, forming a poor and shallow harbor: it is dangerous to remain there long for fear of being driven onshore by a gust of wind. When any pilgrims disembark there, interpreters and other officers of the sultan instantly hasten to ascertain their numbers, to serve them as guides, and to receive, in the name of their master, the customary tribute."

=== Ottoman period ===
==== 16th–18th centuries ====
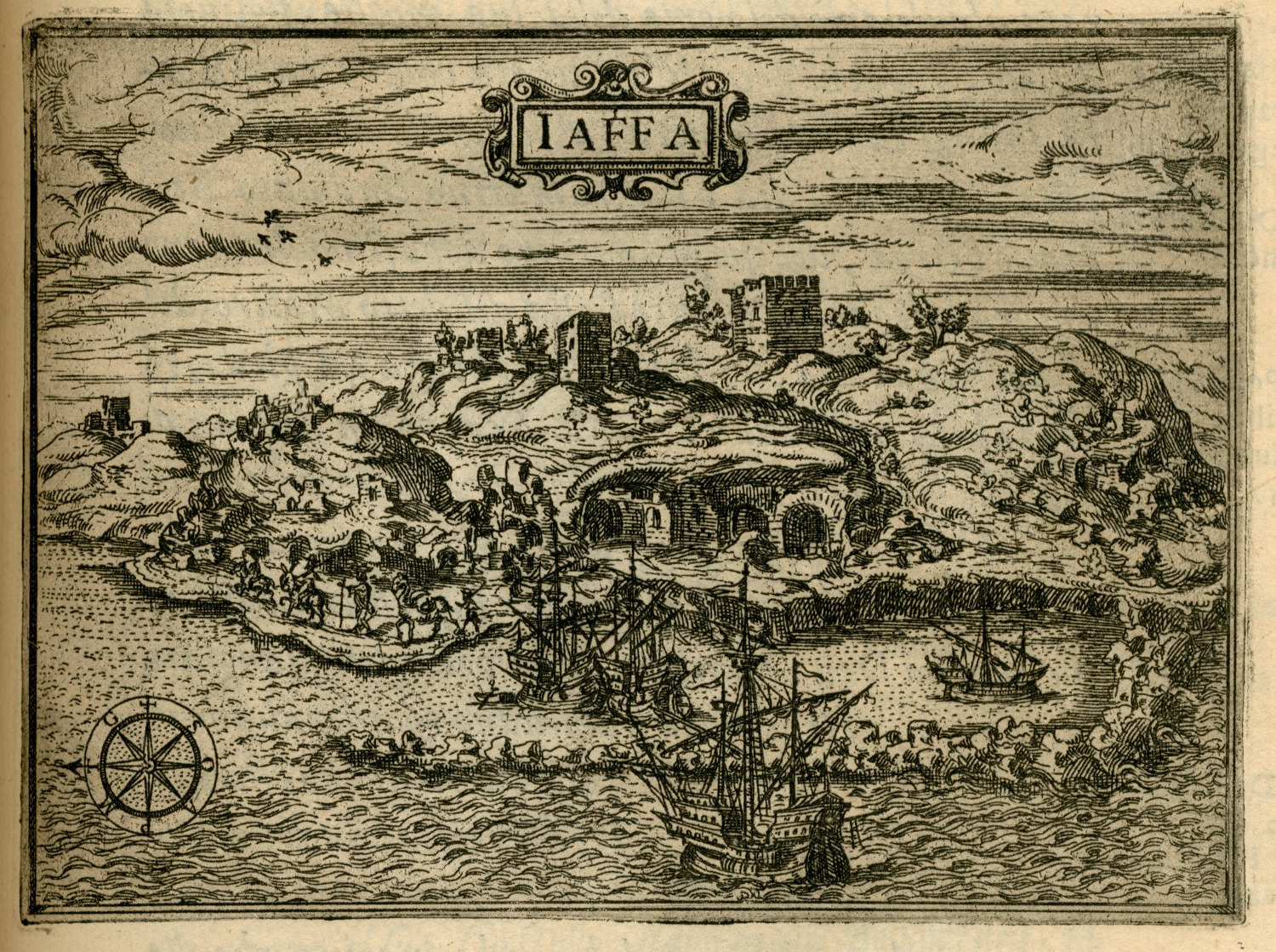
Jaffa in 1587, by Jean Zuallart

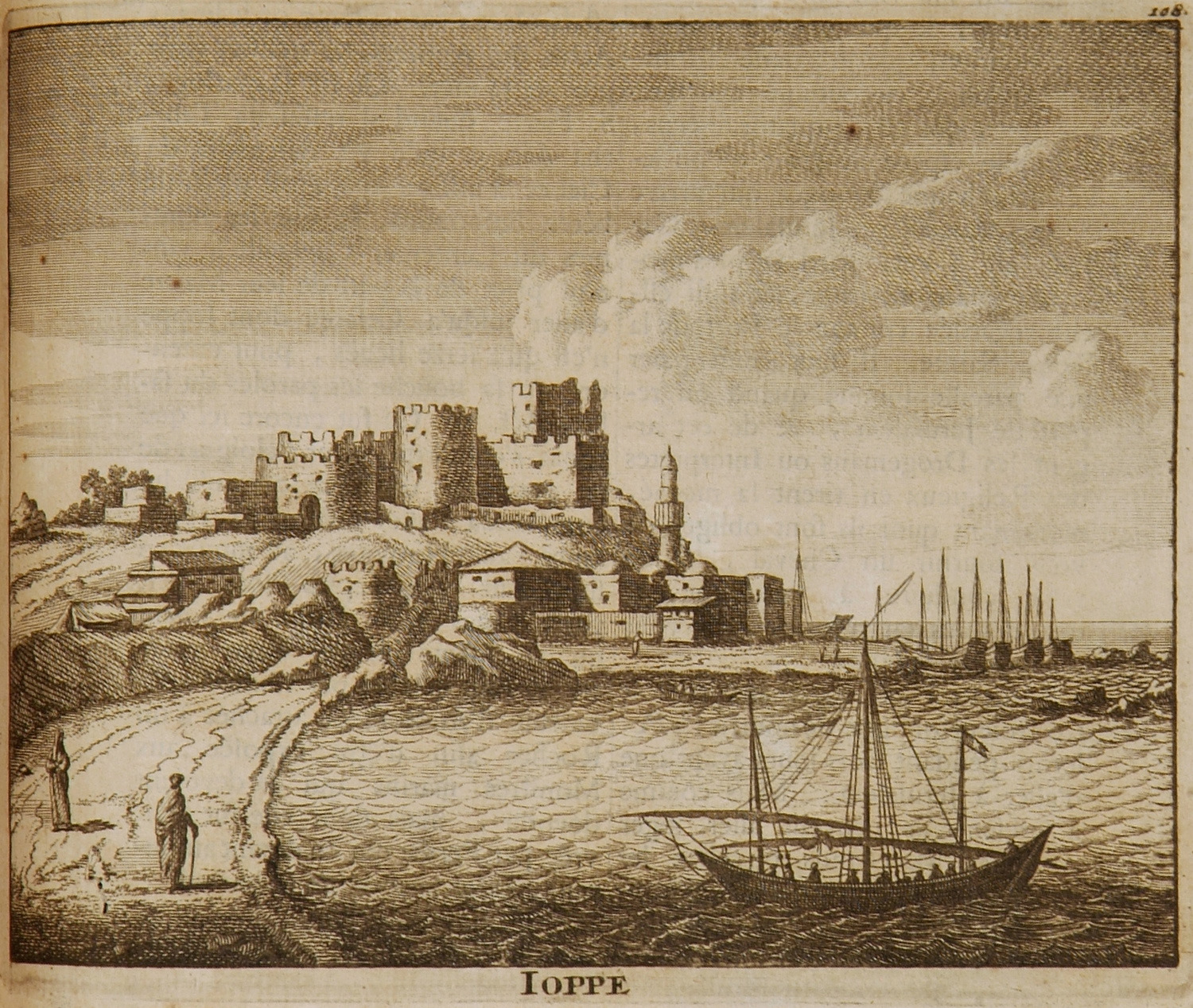
Jaffa in 1714, by Cornelis de Bruijn

In 1515, Jaffa was conquered by the Ottoman sultan Selim I.

In the census of 1596, it appeared located in the nahiya of Ramla in the liwa of Gaza. It had a population of 15 households, all Muslim. They paid a fixed tax rate of 33,3 % on various products; a total of 7,520 akçe.

The traveller Jean Cotwyk (Cotovicus) described Jaffa as a heap of ruins when he visited in 1598. Botanist and traveller Leonhard Rauwolf landed near the site of the town on 13 September 1575 and wrote "we landed on the high, rocky shore where the town of Joppe did stand formerly, at this time the town was so demolished that there was not one house to be found." (p. 212, Rauwolf, 1582)

The 17th century saw the beginning of the re-establishment of churches and hostels for Christian pilgrims en route to Jerusalem and the Galilee. During the 18th century, the coastline around Jaffa was often besieged by pirates and this led to the inhabitants relocating to Ramla and Lod, where they relied on messages from a solitary guard house to inform them when ships were approaching the harbour. The landing of goods and passengers was notoriously difficult and dangerous. Until well into the 20th century, ships had to rely on teams of oarsmen to bring their cargo ashore.

In 1775, Jaffa, then controlled by Daher al-Umar, was besieged by Abu al-Dhahab, the mamluk strongman of Ottoman Egypt. After 49 days of siege, the city was captured and all adult males in the city were executed, the women and children taken captive.

==== Napoleon (1799) ====
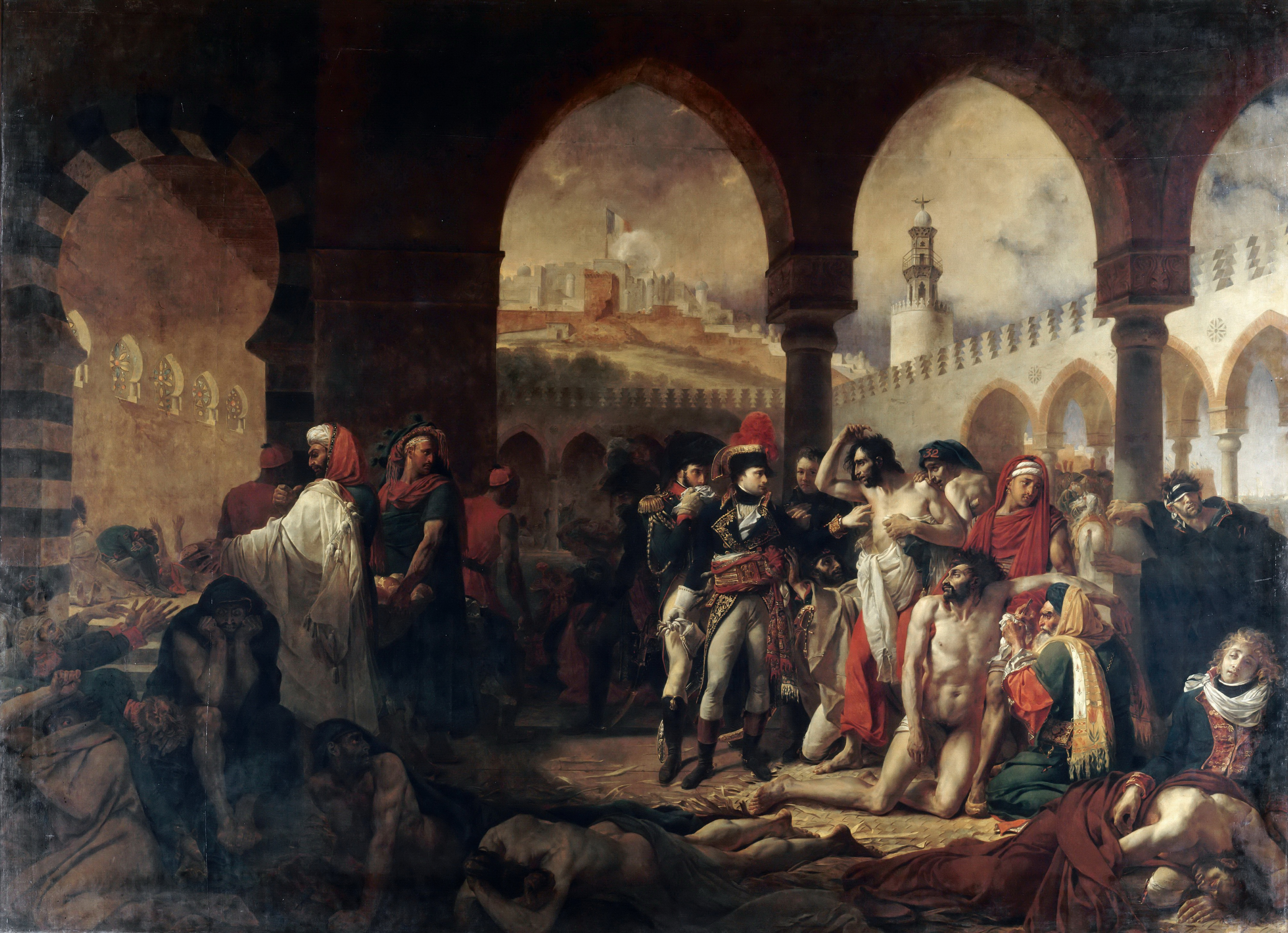
Bonaparte Visiting the Plague Victims of Jaffa, 1804 propaganda painting commissioned by Napoleon; completed by Baron Gros, who had not visited Jaffa

On 7 March 1799, French troops under Napoleon captured the town in what became known as the siege of Jaffa. The French breached the city walls, after which Napoleon granted his troops two days to sack the city in retaliation for his envoys being killed when delivering an ultimatum of surrender. French soldiers rampaged through the city, killing, looting and raping. Napoleon also ordered the massacre of 2,100 Ottoman prisoners of war after discovering that some of them had been previously captured by the French and released upon a promise not to take up arms again. Napoleon's deputy commissioner of war Jacques-François Miot described it thus:

On 10 March 1799 in the afternoon, the prisoners of Jaffa were marched off in the midst of a vast square phalanx formed by the troops of General Bon ... The Turks, walking along in total disorder, had already guessed their fate and appeared not even to shed any tears ... When they finally arrived in the sand dunes to the southwest of Jaffa, they were ordered to halt beside a pool of yellowish water. The officer commanding the troops then divided the mass of prisoners into small groups, who were led off to several different points and shot ... Finally, of all the prisoners there only remained those who were beside the pool of water. Our soldiers had used up their cartridges, so there was nothing to be done but to dispatch them with bayonets and knives. ... The result ... was a terrible pyramid of dead and dying bodies dripping blood and the bodies of those already dead had to be pulled away so as to finish off those unfortunate beings who, concealed under this awful and terrible wall of bodies, had not yet been struck down.

Many more died in an epidemic of bubonic plague that broke out soon afterwards.

==== 19th century ====
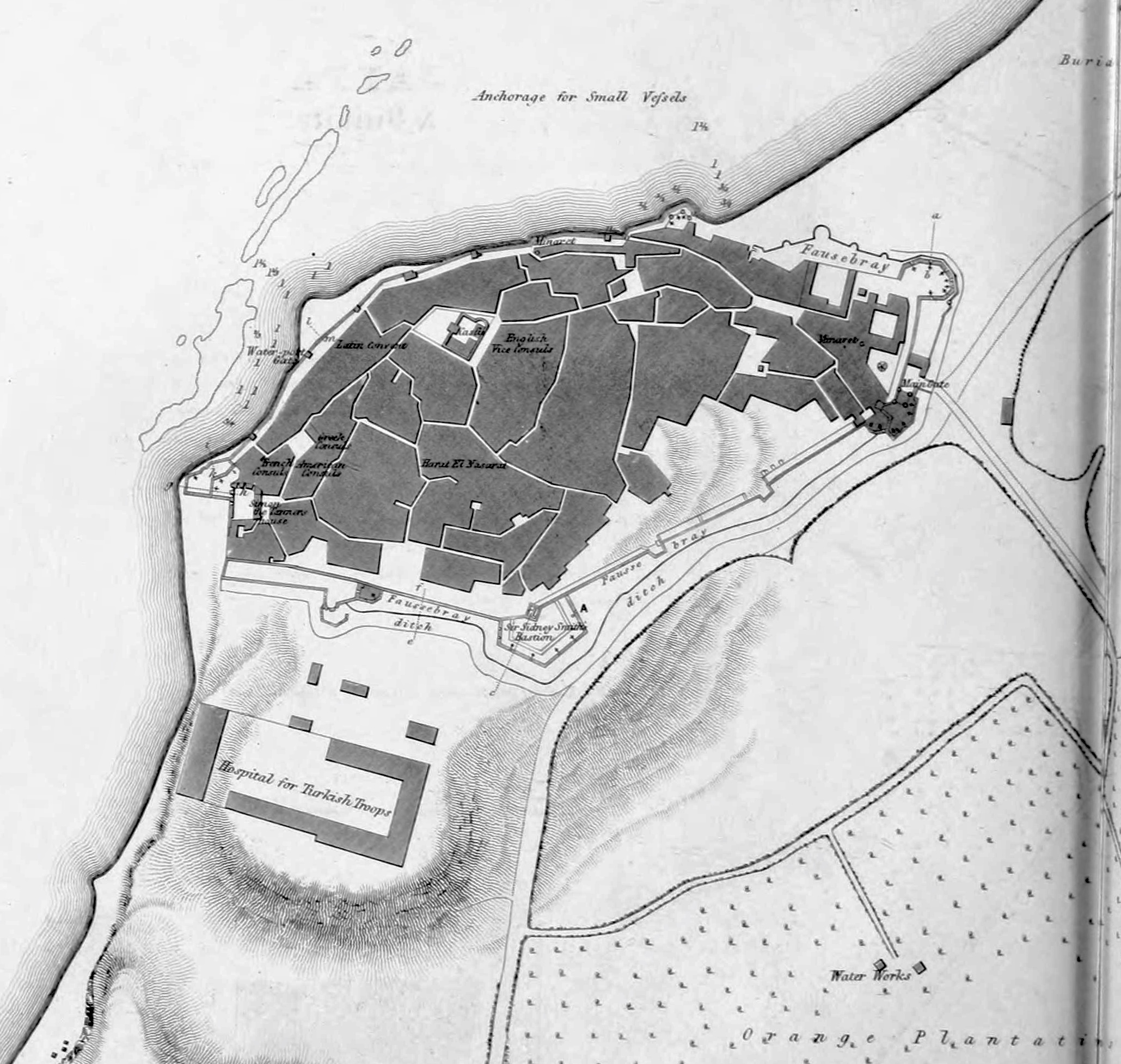
Jaffa in 1841, as mapped by the British Royal Engineers after the Oriental Crisis of 1840

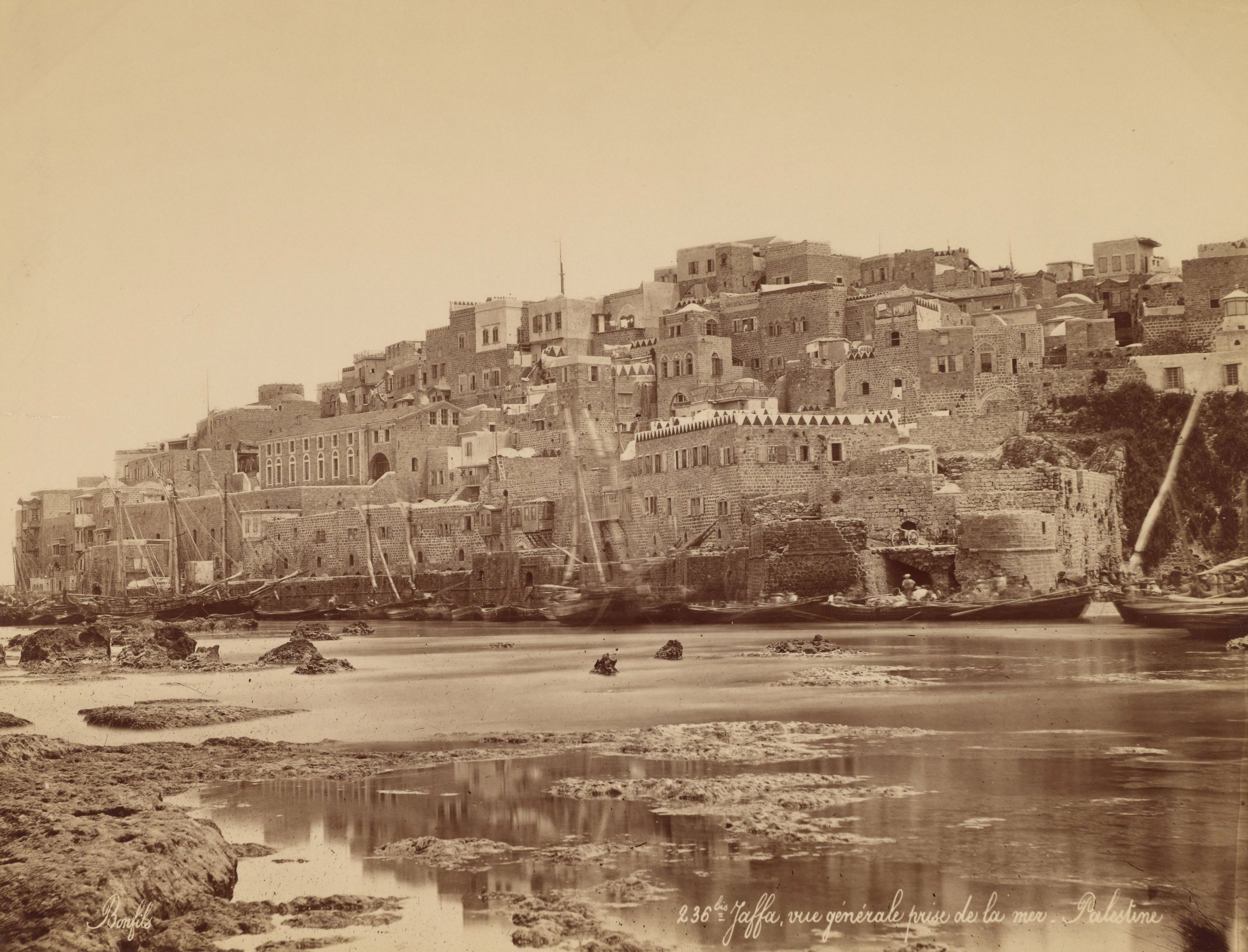
View of the port by Félix Bonfils, 1867–1870

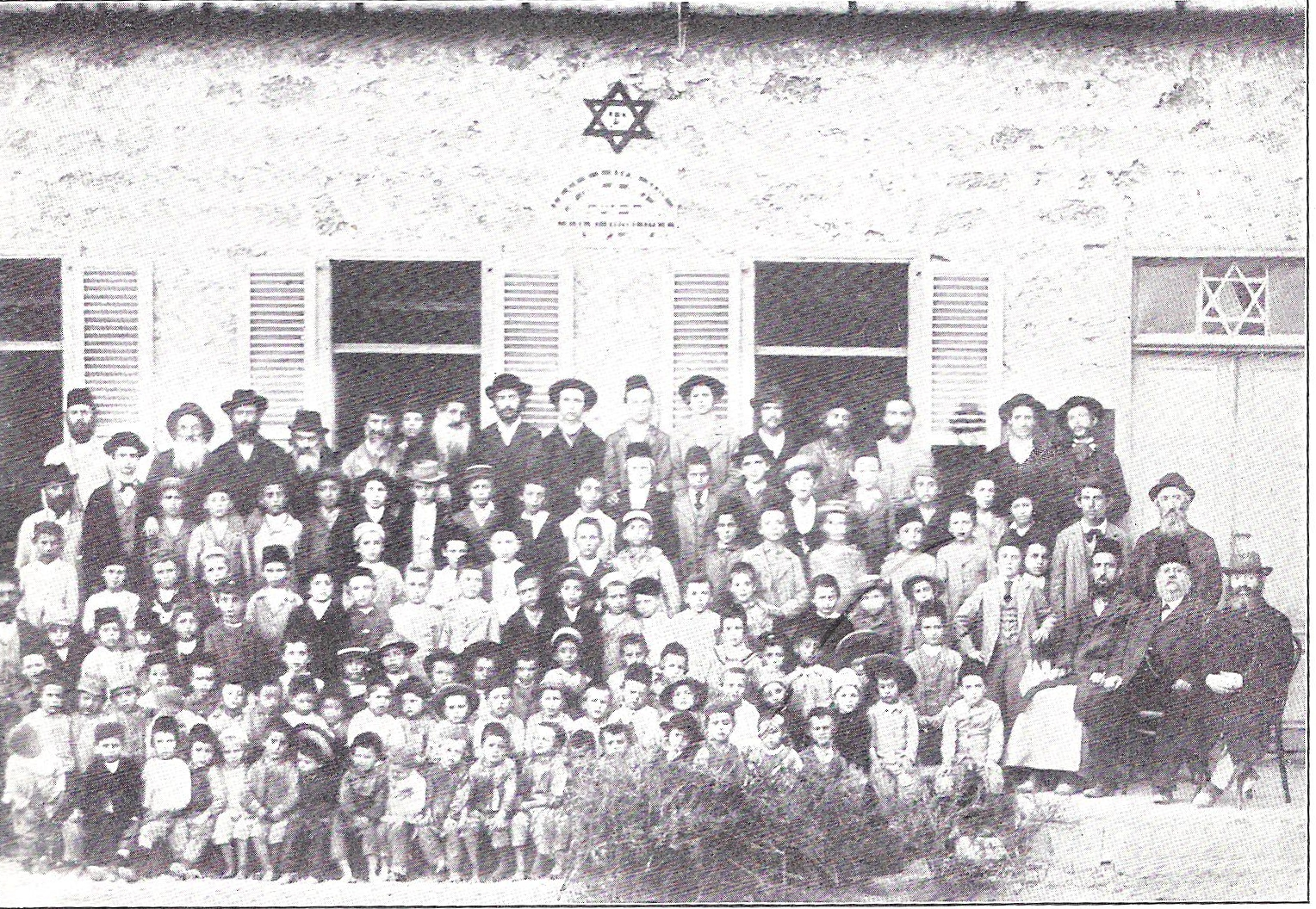
Jewish preschool (Cheder) of studies in Yiddish and Hebrew, Jaffa, c. 1890s

Residential life in the city was reestablished in the early 19th century. The governor who was appointed after the devastation brought about by Napoleon, Muhammad Abu-Nabbut, commenced wide-ranging building and restoration work in Jaffa, including the Mahmoudiya Mosque and the public fountain known as Sabil Abu Nabbut. During the 1834 Peasants' revolt in Palestine, Jaffa was besieged for forty days by "mountaineers" in revolt against Ibrahim Pasha of Egypt.

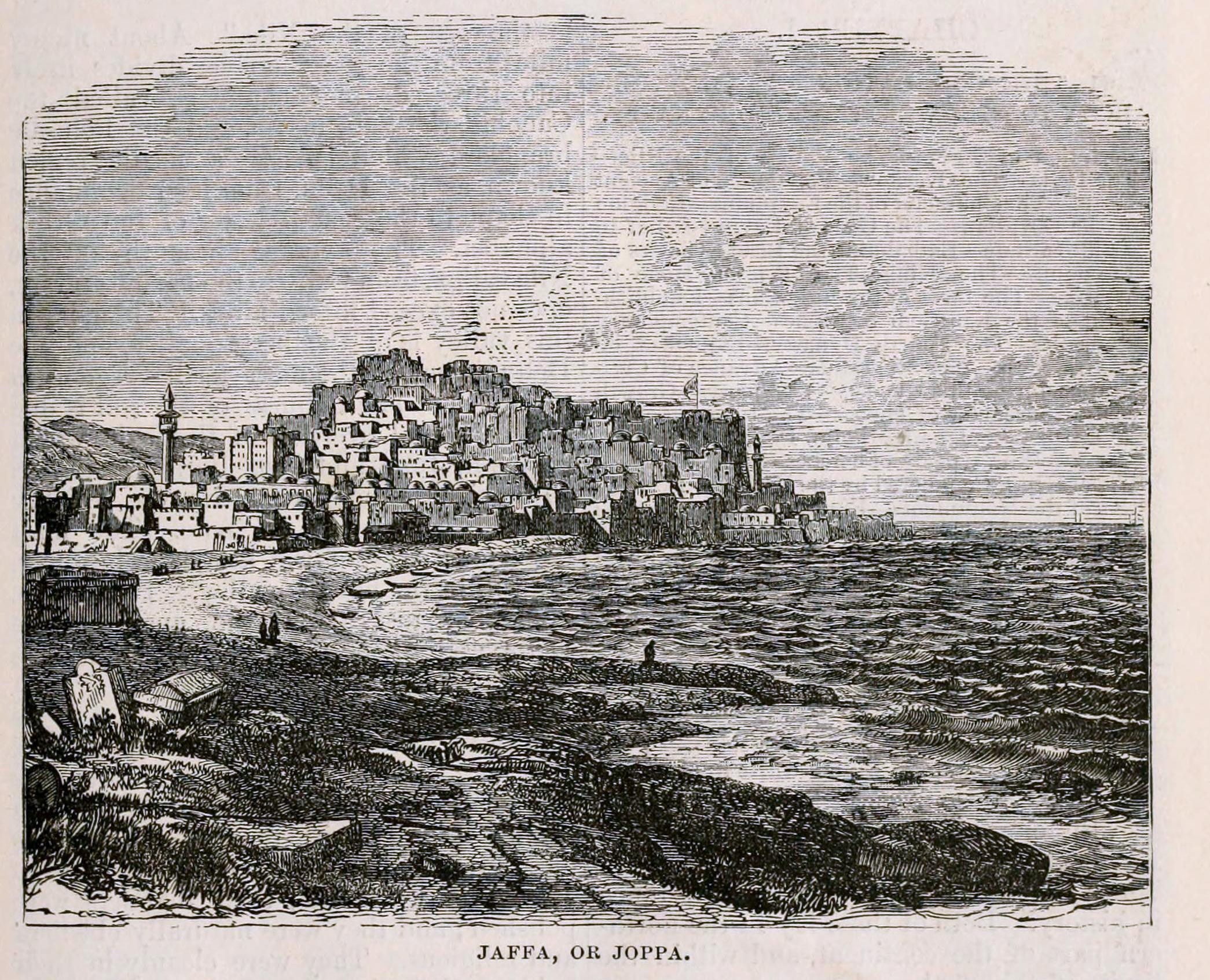
1877 illustration of "Jaffa, or Joppa"

In 1820, Isaiah Ajiman of Istanbul built a synagogue and hostel for the accommodation of Jews on their way to their four holy cities - Jerusalem, Hebron, Tiberias and Safed. This area became known as Dar al-Yehud (Arabic for "the house of the Jews"); and was the basis of the Jewish community in Jaffa. The appointment of Mahmud Aja as Ottoman governor marked the beginning of a period of stability and growth for the city, interrupted by the 1832 conquest of the city by Muhammad Ali of Egypt.

By 1839, at least 153 Sephardic Jews were living in Jaffa. The community was served for fifty years by Rabbi Yehuda HaLevi miRagusa. In the early 1850s, HaLevi leased an orchard to Clorinda S. Minor, founder of a Christian messianic community that established Mount Hope, a farming initiative to encourage local Jews to learn manual trades, which the Messianics did in order to pave the way for the Second Coming of Jesus. In 1855, the British Jewish philanthropist Moses Montefiore bought the orchard from HaLevi, although Minor continued to manage it.

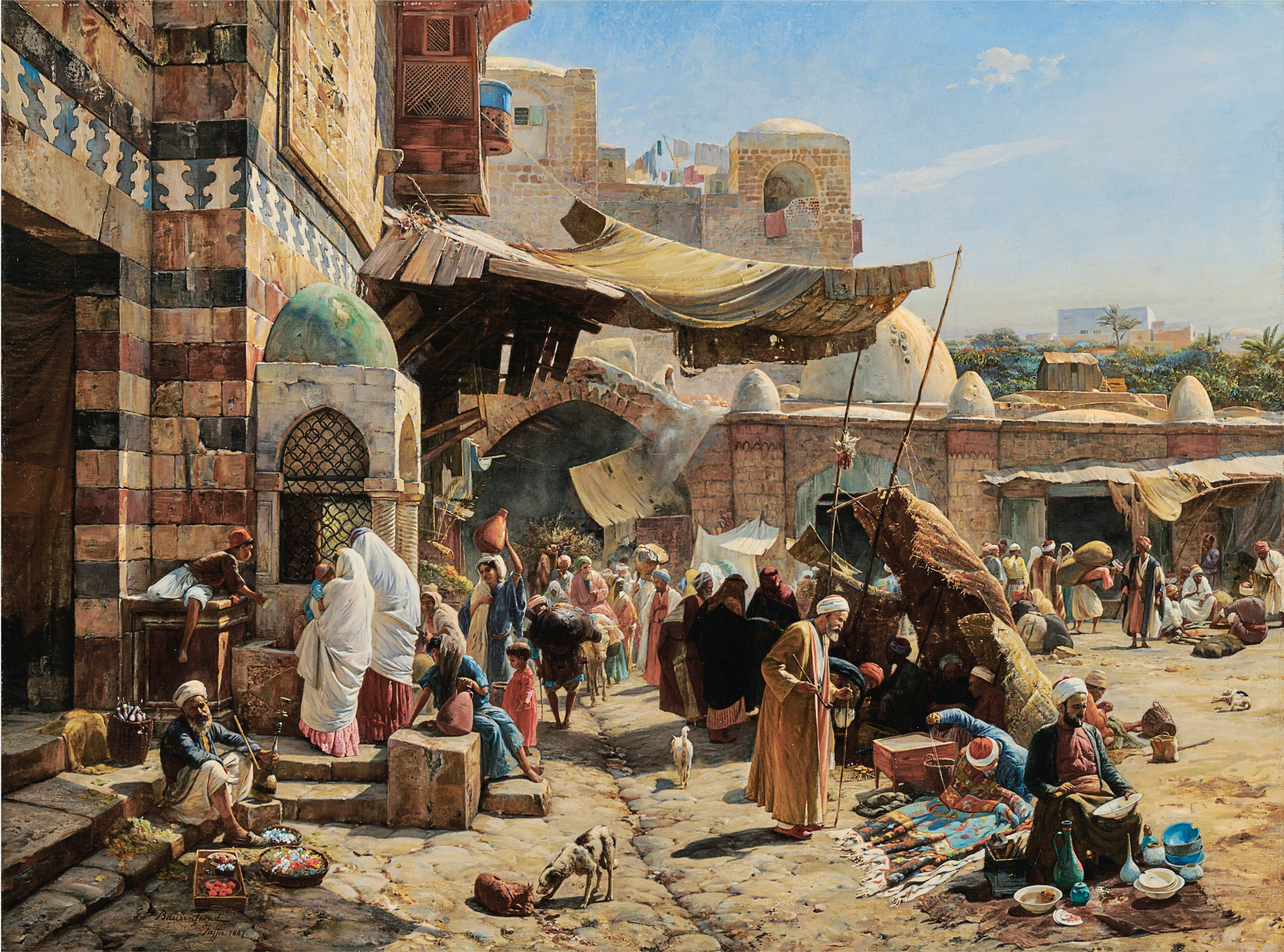
Market at Jaffa, by Gustav Bauernfeind, 1887

American missionary Ellen Clare Miller, visiting Jaffa in 1867, reported that the town had a population of "about 5000, 1000 of these being Christians, 800 Jews and the rest Moslems".

The city walls were torn down during the 1870s, allowing the city to expand.

==== 1900–1915 ====
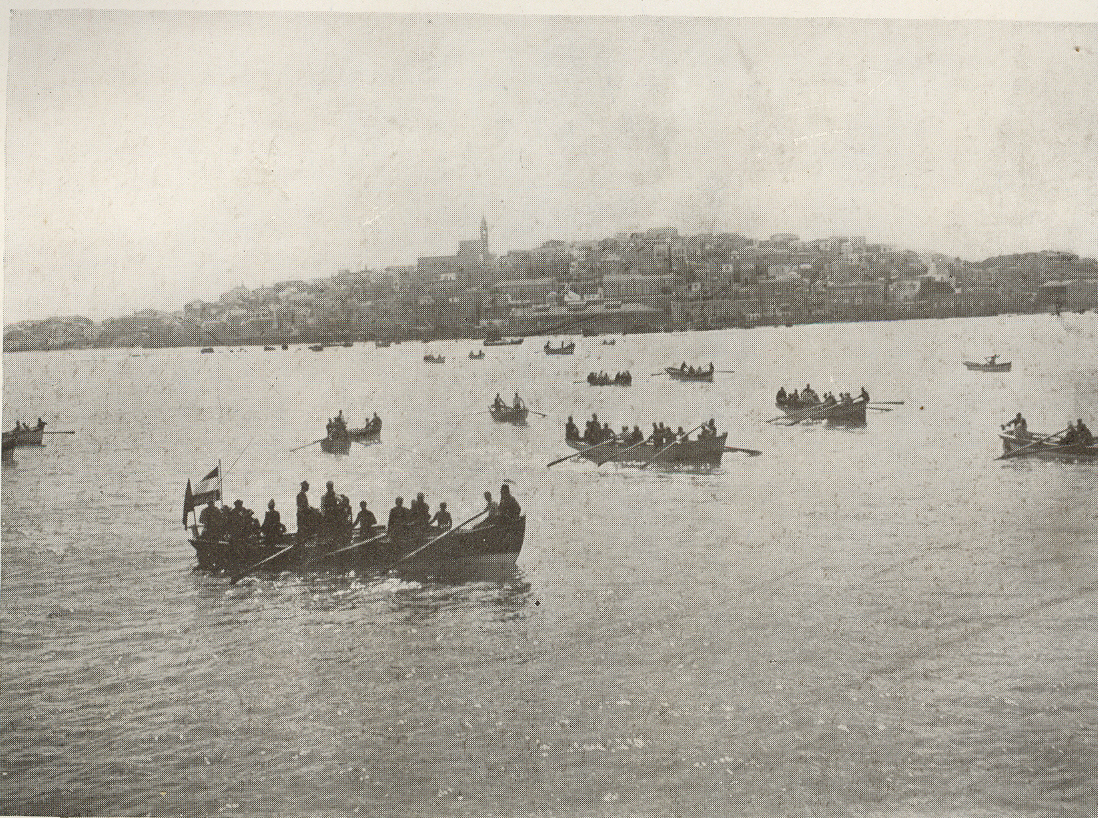
Boatmen waiting to land passengers, c. 1911

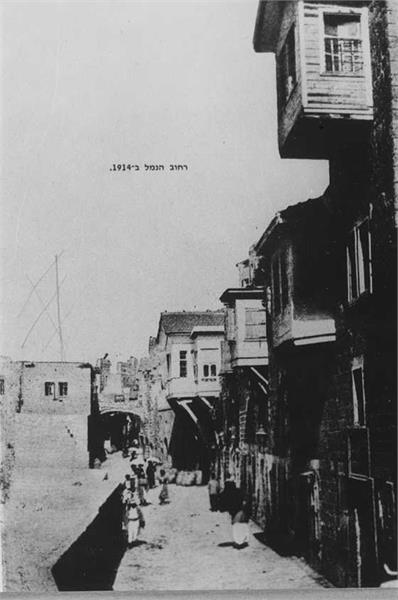
Jaffa street beside port, 1914

By the beginning of the 20th century, the population of Jaffa had swelled considerably. A group of Jews left Jaffa for the sand dunes to the north, where in 1909 they held a lottery to divide the lots acquired earlier. The settlement was known at first as Ahuzat Bayit, but an assembly of its residents changed its name to Tel Aviv in 1910. Other Jewish suburbs to Jaffa had already been founded since 1887, with others following until the Great War.

In 1904, rabbi Abraham Isaac Kook (1864–1935) moved to Ottoman Palestine and took up the position of Chief Rabbi of Jaffa.

Jaffa was struck by three locust waves during the 1915 Ottoman Syria locust infestation. The economic costs in the Jaffa District were estimated at 800,000 golden francs.

==== Late Ottoman-period economy ====
In the 19th century, Jaffa was best known for its soap industry. Modern industry emerged in the late 1880s. The most successful enterprises were metalworking factories, among them the machine shop run by the Templers that employed over 100 workers in 1910. Other factories produced orange-crates, barrels, corks, noodles, ice, seltzer, candy, soap, olive oil, leather, alkali, wine, cosmetics and ink. Most of the newspapers and books printed in Ottoman Palestine were published in Jaffa.

In 1859, a Jewish visitor, L. A. Frankl, found sixty-five Jewish families living in Jaffa, 'about 400 soul in all.' Of these four were shoemakers, three tailors, one silversmith and one watchmaker. There were also merchants and shopkeepers and 'many live by manual labour, porters, sailors, messengers, etc.'

==== Late Ottoman agriculture; Jaffa oranges ====
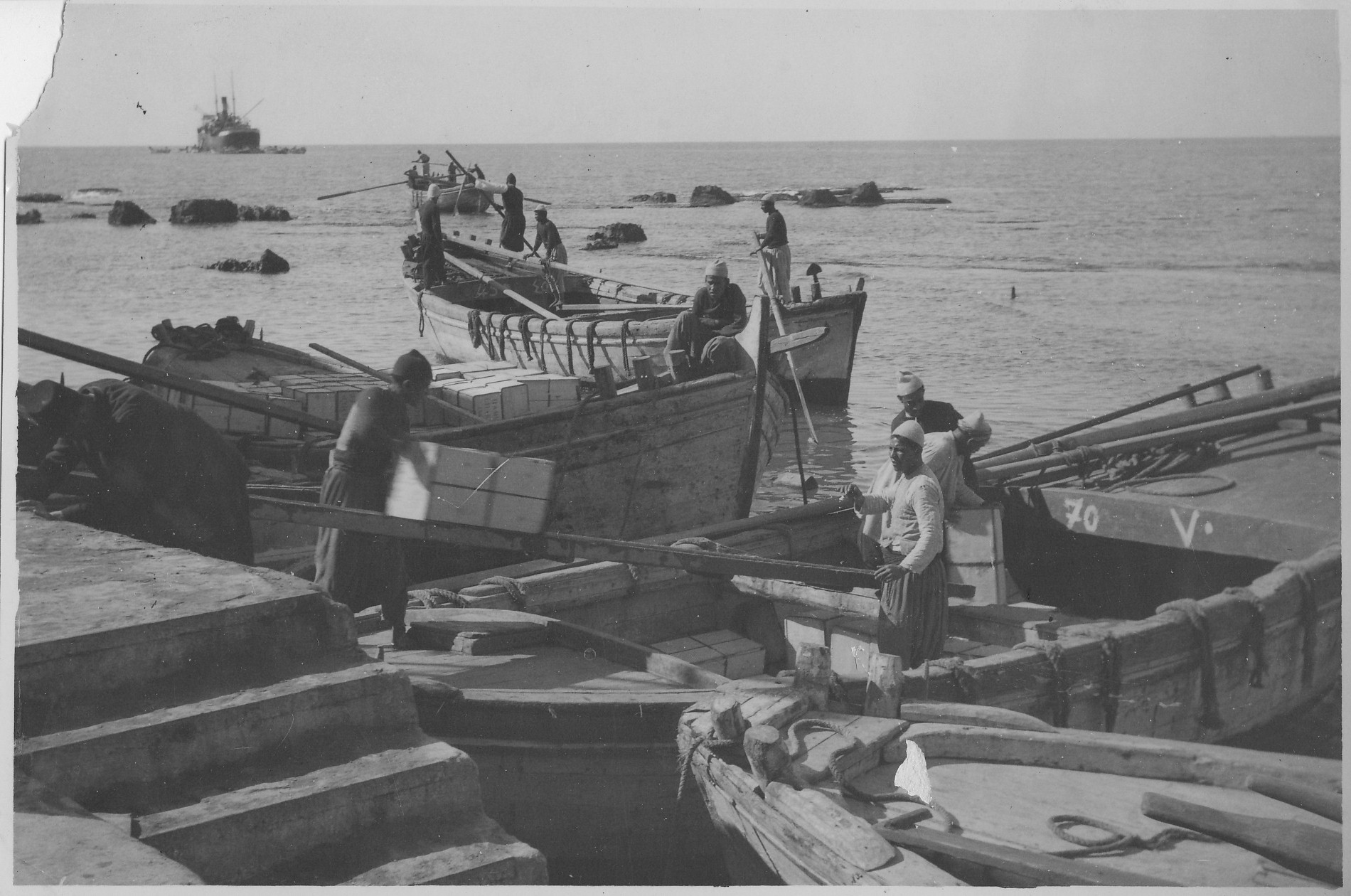
Crates of Jaffa oranges being ferried to a waiting freighter for export, circa 1930

Until the mid-19th century, Jaffa's orange groves were mainly owned by Arabs, who employed traditional methods of farming. The pioneers of modern agriculture in Jaffa were American settlers, who brought in farm machinery in the 1850s and 1860s, followed by the Templers and the Jews. From the 1880s, real estate became an important branch of the economy. A 'biarah' (a watered garden) cost 100,000 piastres and annually produced 15,000, of which the farming costs were 5,000: 'A very fair percentage return on the investment.' Water for the gardens was easily accessible with wells between ten and forty feet deep.

Jaffa's citrus industry began to flourish in the last quarter of the 19th century. E.C. Miller records that 'about ten million' oranges were being exported annually, and that the town was surrounded by 'three or four hundred orange gardens, each containing upwards of one thousand trees'. Shamuti or Shamouti oranges, aka "Jaffa oranges", were the major crop, but citrons, lemons and mandarin oranges were also grown. Jaffa had a reputation for producing the best pomegranates.

Developed the mid-19th century, the Jaffa orange was first produced for export in the city after being developed by Arab farmers. The orange was the primary citrus export for the city. Today, along with the navel and bitter orange, it is one of three main varieties of the fruit grown in the Mediterranean, the Middle East, and Southern Europe.

The Jaffa orange emerged as a mutation on a tree of the 'Baladi' variety of sweet orange (C. sinensis) near the city of Jaffa. After the Crimean War (1853–56), the most important innovation in local agriculture was the rapid expansion of citrus cultivation. Foremost among the varieties cultivated was the Jaffa (Shamouti) orange, and mention of it being exported to Europe first appears in British consular reports in the 1850s. One factor cited in the growth of the export market was the development of steamships in the first half of the 19th century, which enabled the export of oranges to the European markets in days rather than weeks. Another reason cited for the growth of the industry was the relative lack of European control over the cultivation of oranges compared to cotton, formerly a primary commodity crop of Palestine, but outpaced by the Jaffa orange.

The prosperity of the orange industry brought increased European interest and involvement in the development of Jaffa. In 1902, a study of the growth of the orange industry by Zionist officials outlined the different Palestinian owners and their primary export markets as England, Turkey, Egypt and Austria-Hungary. While the traditional Arabic cultivation methods were considered "primitive," an in-depth study of the financial expenditure involved reveals that they were ultimately more cost-efficient than the Zionist-European enterprises that followed them some two decades later.

==== First World War ====
In 1917, the Tel Aviv and Jaffa deportation resulted in the Ottomans expelling the entire civilian population. While Muslim evacuees were allowed to return before long, the Jewish evacuees remained in camps (and some in Egypt) until after the British conquest.

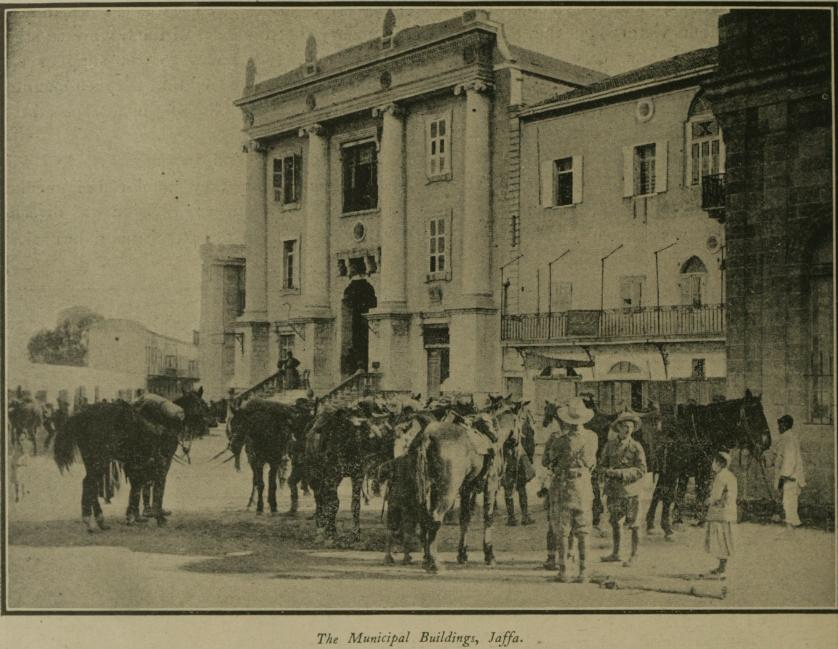
New Zealand soldiers outside Jaffa municipality building, WWI (winter 1917–18)

During the course of their campaign through Ottoman Palestine and the Sinai (1915–1918) against the Ottomans, the British took Jaffa in November 1917, although it remained under observation and fire from the Ottomans. The battle of Jaffa in late December 1917 pushed back the Ottoman forces securing Jaffa and the line of communication between it and Jerusalem, which had already been taken on 11 December.

=== British Mandate ===
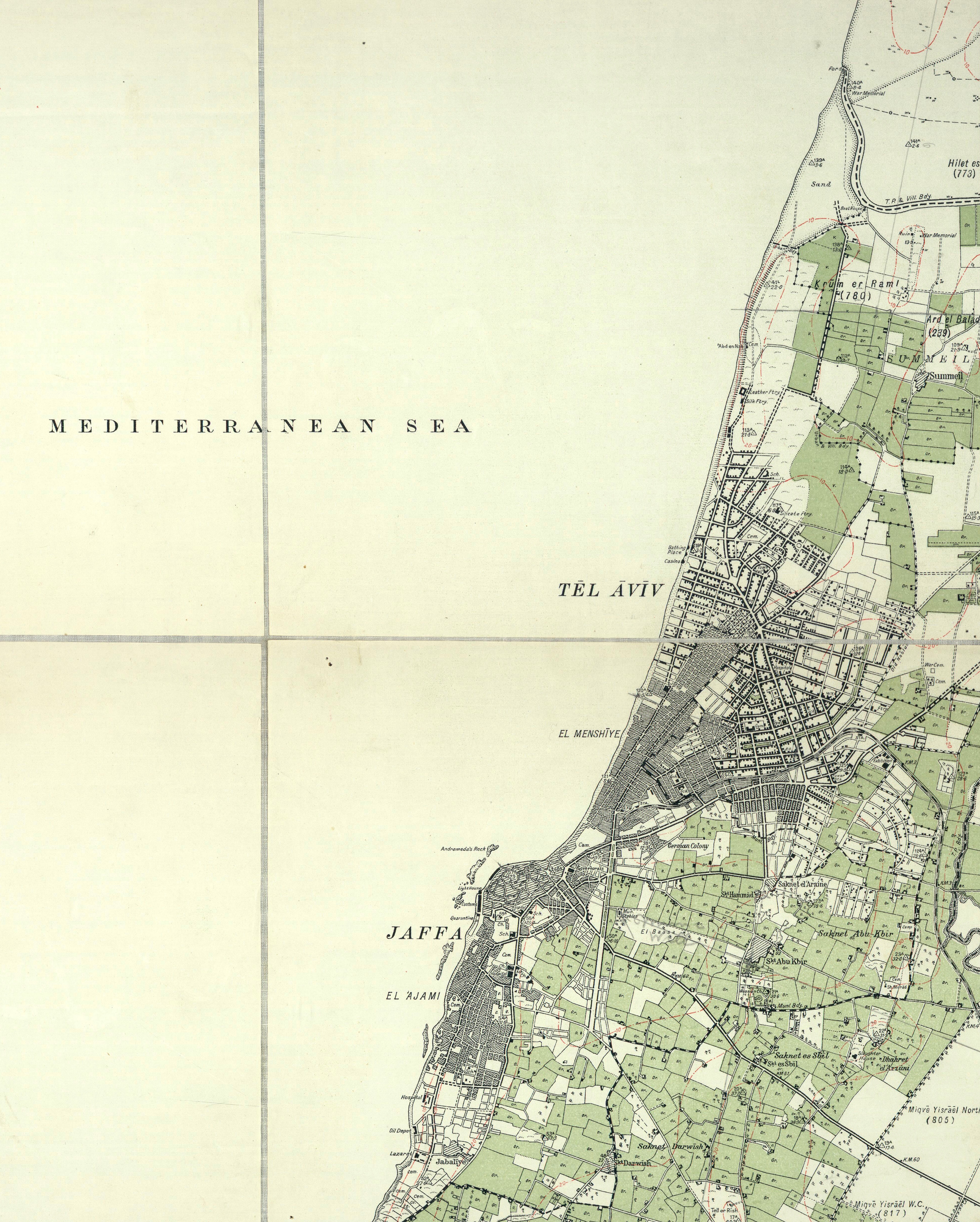
Jaffa 1929 1:20,000

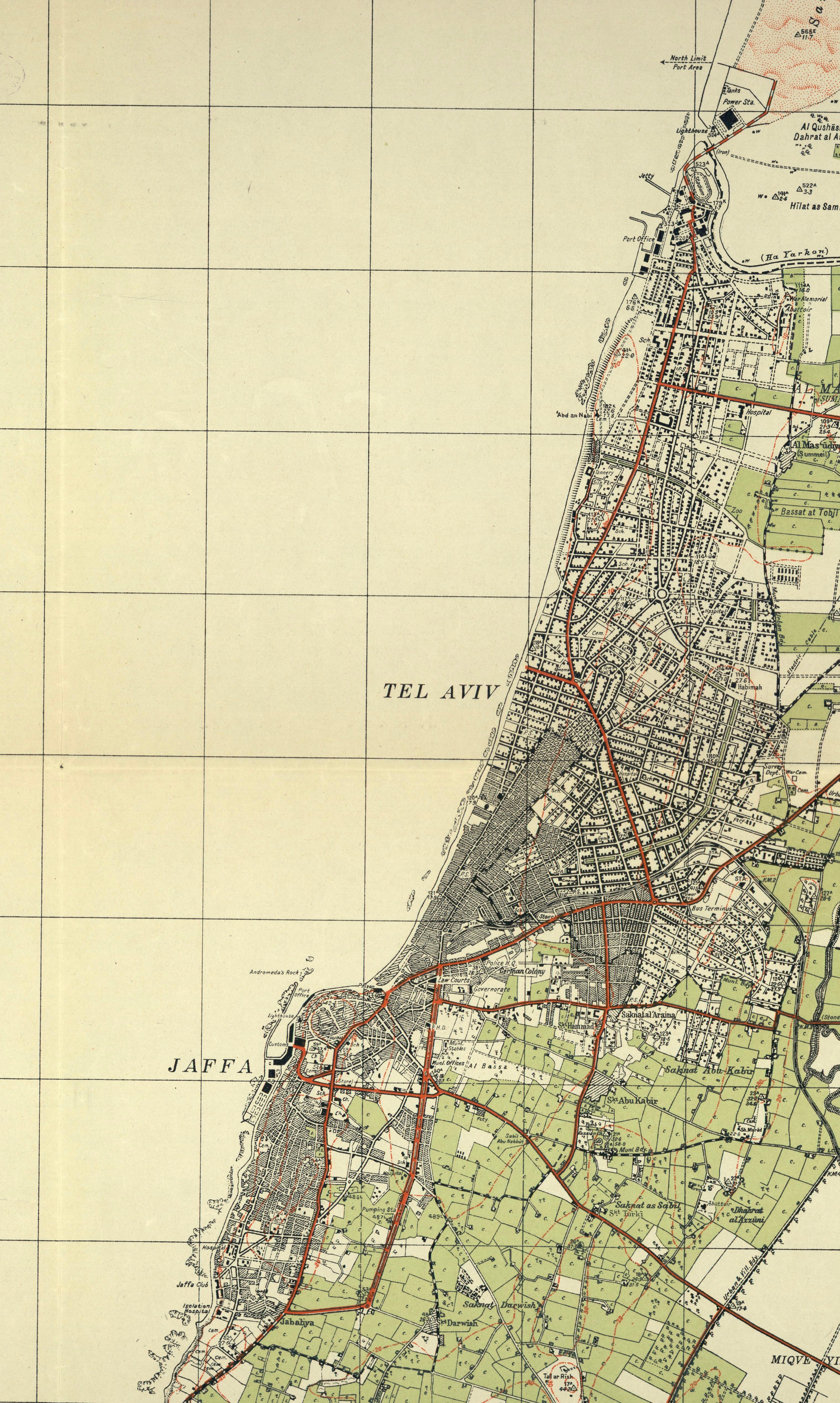
Jaffa 1943 1:20,000

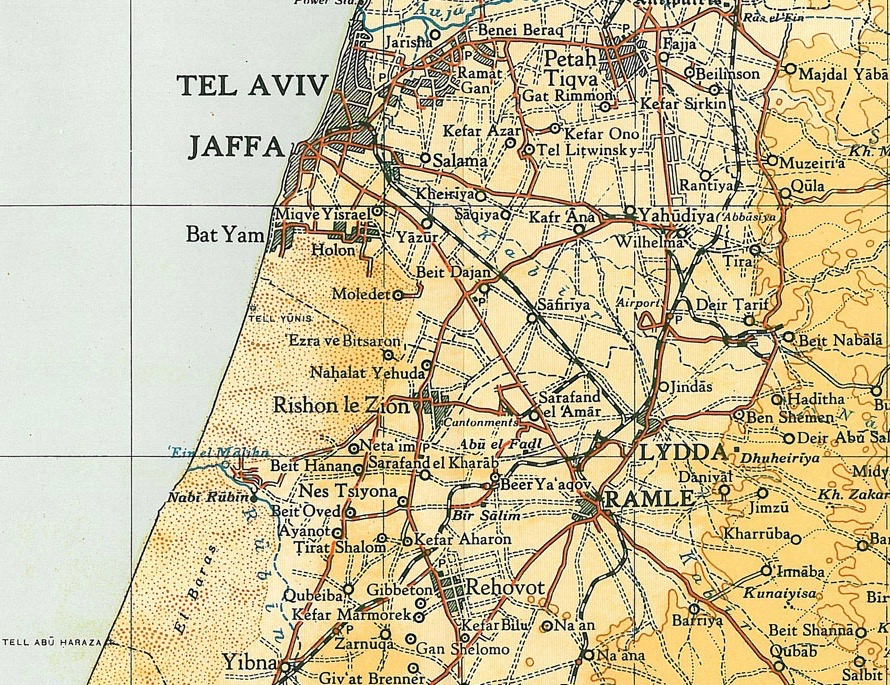
Jaffa 1945 1:250,000

==== 1920s: conflict and development ====
According to the 1922 census of Palestine conducted by the British Mandate authorities, Jaffa had a population of 47,799, consisting of 20,699 Muslims, 20,152 Jews and 6,850 Christians, increasing to 51,866 in the 1931 census, residing in 11,304 houses.

During the British Mandate, tension between the Jewish and Arab population increased. A wave of Arab attacks during 1920 and 1921 caused many Jewish residents to flee and resettle in Tel Aviv, initially a marginal Jewish neighbourhood north of Jaffa. The Jaffa riots in 1921, (known in Hebrew as Meoraot Tarpa) began with a May Day parade that turned violent. Arab rioters attacked Jewish residents and buildings killing 47 Jews and wounding 146, and 48 Arabs were killed and 73 wounded. The Hebrew author Yosef Haim Brenner was killed in the riots. At the end of 1922, Tel Aviv had 15,000 residents: by 1927, the population had risen to 38,000.

Still, during most of the 1920s Jaffa and Tel Aviv maintained peaceful co-existence. Most Jewish businesses were located in Jaffa, some Jewish neighbourhoods paid taxes to the municipality of Jaffa, many young Jews who could not afford the housing costs of Tel Aviv resided there, and the big neighbourhood of Menashiya was by and large fully mixed. The first electric company in the British Mandate of Palestine, although owned by Jewish shareholders, had been named the Jaffa Electric Company. In 1923, both Jaffa and Tel Aviv had begun a rapid process of wired electrification through a joint grid.

==== 1930s: Arab revolt (1936–39) ====
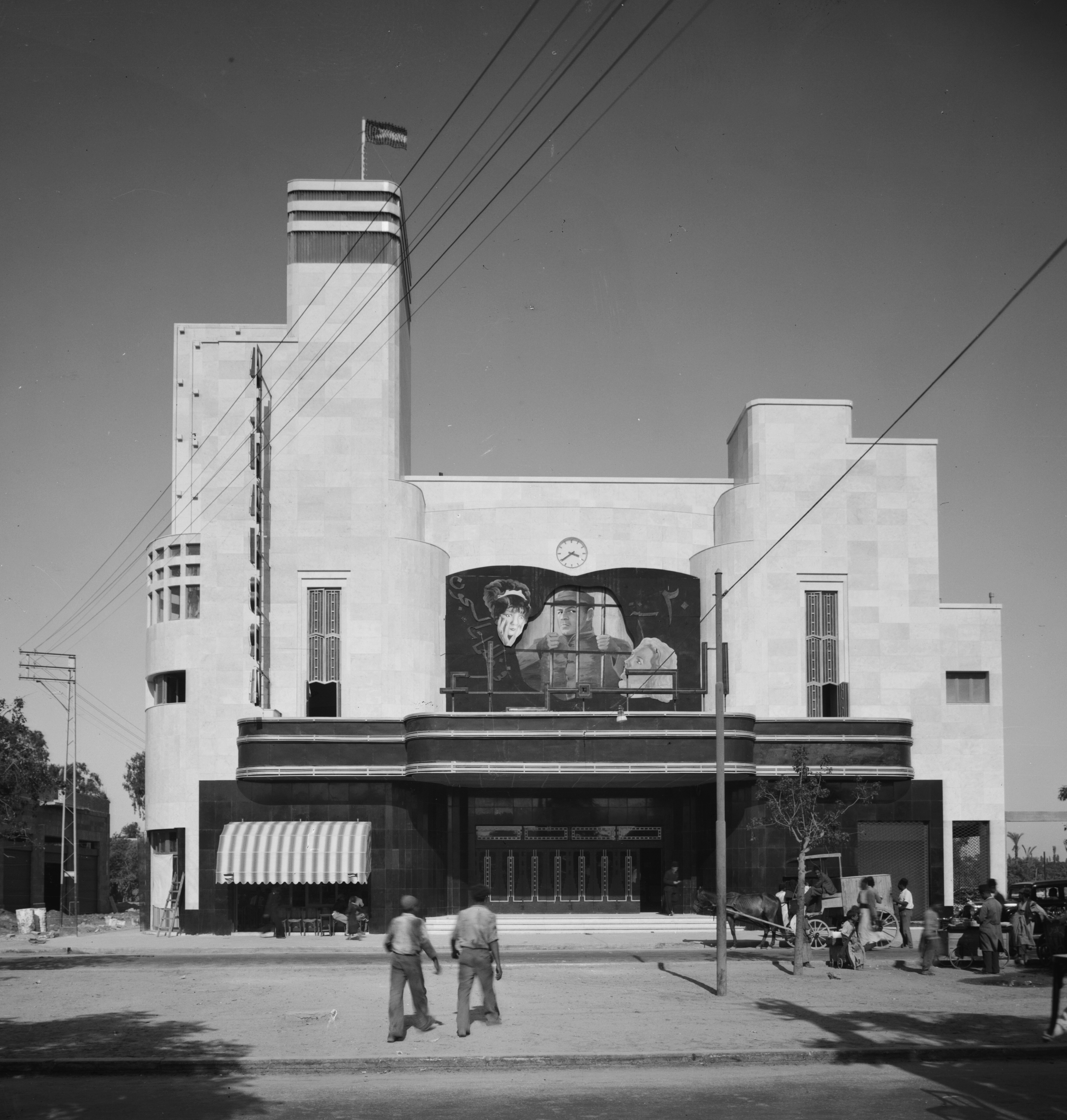
Jaffa's Alhambra Cinema flying an Arab flag, 1937

The 1936–1939 Arab revolt in Palestine severely impacted Jaffa. On 19 April 1936, riots broke out in Jaffa after rumours spread among the local Arab community that Jews had started to kill Arabs; Arab rioters attacked Jewish targets for three days before British security forces quelled the rioting. 9 Jews and 2 Arabs were killed and dozens more were wounded. In response to the riots, Arab leadership in Palestine declared a general strike, which began in the Jaffa Port and quickly spread to the rest of the region. After the start of the general strike, British troops stationed in Palestine were bolstered by reinforcements from Malta and Egypt to subdue rioting which had broken out in several major Palestinian cities. Arab rioters in Jaffa used the Old City, which contained a maze of homes, winding alleyways and an underground sewer system, to escape arrest by British security forces.

Beginning in May 1936, in response to further Arab unrest in Jaffa, the British authorities suspended municipal services in the city, establishing barricades around the Old City and covering access roads with glass shards and nails. On June of that year, Royal Air Force bombers dropped boxes of leaflets in Arabic on Jaffa, requesting the city's inhabitants to evacuate that same day. In June 15, the Royal Engineers used gelignite charges to demolish between 220 and 240 Arab-owned homes in the Old City, leaving an open strip which cut through the centre of Jaffa from end to end and displacing approximately 6,000 Arabs. On the evening of 17 June, 1,500 British troops entered Jaffa and a Royal Navy warship moved near the Jaffa Port to seal off escape routes by sea. On 29 June, British forces carried out another round of house demolitions, carving a swath from north to south.

The British authorities claimed that house demolitions in Jaffa were part of a "facelift" given to the Old City. Local Arab newspapers resorted to using sarcasm to describe the demolitions, writing that the British had "beautified" Jaffa using boxes of gelignite. Sir Michael McDonnell, then serving as the Chief Justice of the Supreme Court of Palestine, found in favour of Arab petitions from Jaffa and, upholding existing laws regarding house demolitions, ruled against the demolitions carried out by British forces in the Old City. In response, the Colonial Office dismissed him from his post. The report produced by the Peel Commission in 1937 recommended that Jaffa, together with Bethlehem, Jerusalem, Lydda and Ramle, remain under permanent British control, forming a "corridor" from the sea port to the Holy Places, accessible to Arabs and Jews alike; whereas the rest of Mandatory Palestine was to be split between an Arab state and a Jewish state.

==== 1940–47: WWII; frictions ====
Village Statistics of 1945 listed Jaffa with a population of 94,310, of whom 50,880 were Muslims, 28,000 were Jews, 15,400 were Christians and 30 were classified as "other". The Christians were mostly Greek Orthodox and about one-sixth of them were members of the Eastern Catholic Churches. One of the most prominent members of the Arab Christian community was the Greek Orthodox Issa El-Issa, publisher of the newspaper Falastin.

In 1945, the Jewish community of Jaffa complained to the city mayor Yousef Haikal that their neighbourhoods didn't receive appropriate municipal services (street lighting and paving, garbage removal, sewerage etc.) even though they contributed 40% of the municipality's budget. Some of the services (education, healthcare, and social services) had already been provided by Tel Aviv Municipality at its own expense, which formed the base for the Jewish community's demand that the Mandatory government annex their neighbourhoods to Tel Aviv. In 1946, Tel Aviv Municipality spent £P 300K on services for the Jewish neighbourhoods of Jaffa, an increase from £P 80K in the year of 1942.

=== 1948 war ===
In 1947, the UN Special Commission on Palestine recommended that Jaffa be included in the planned Jewish state. Due to the large Arab majority, however, it was instead designated as an enclave of the Arab state in the 1947 United Nations Partition Plan for Palestine. The enclave would have excluded the northern Jewish-populated parts of the city, but included the agricultural lands to the south and east of the city, extending to the then-boundaries of Mikveh Israel, Holon and Bat Yam. The resolution was rejected by Palestinian Arab leadership and by the Arab League.

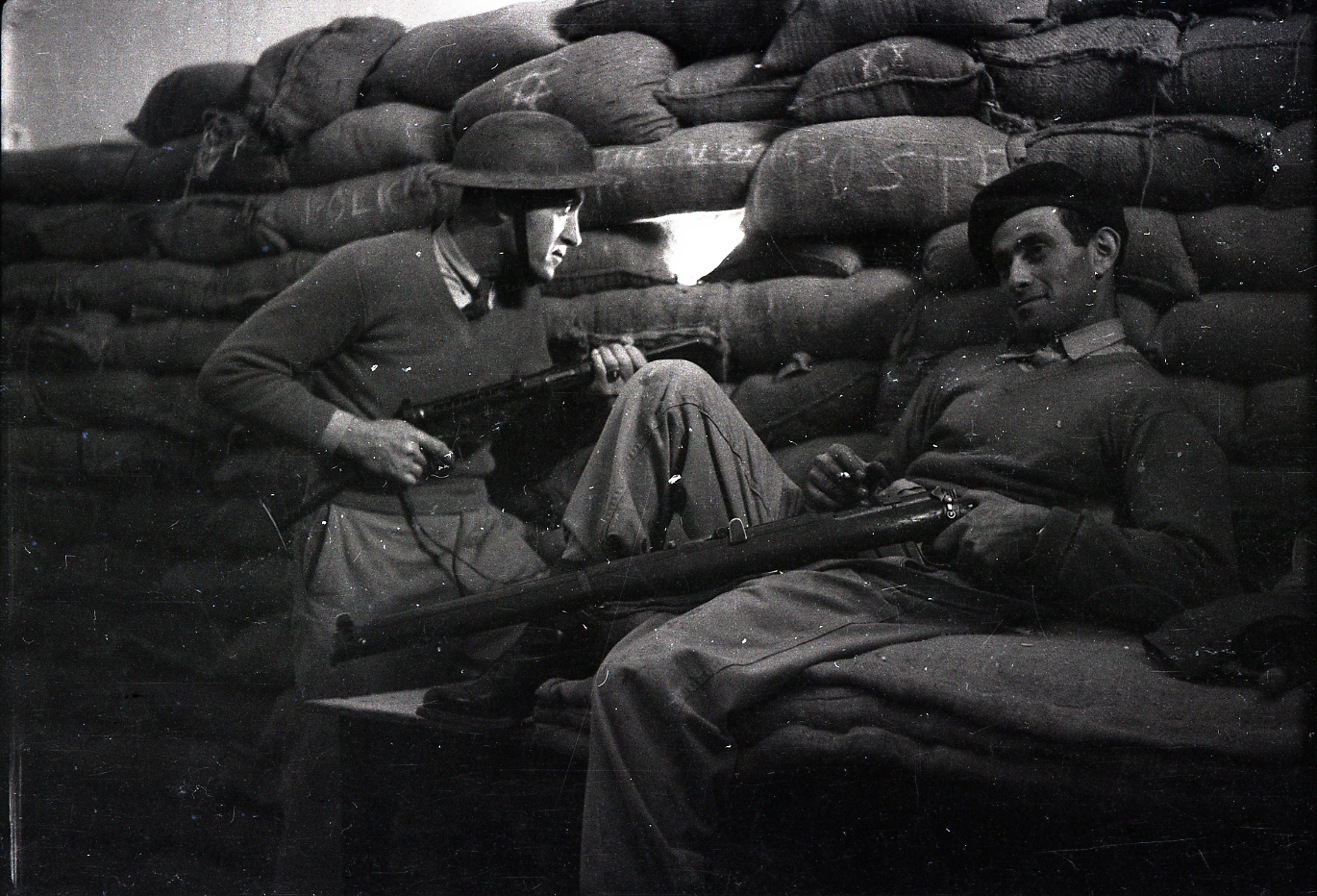
Jewish fighters on the Jaffa-Tel Aviv front in 1947

Following the outbreak of civil war following the passing of the UN partition resolution, the mayors of Jaffa and Tel Aviv tried to calm their communities. One of the main concerns for the people of Jaffa was the protection of the citrus fruit export trade which had still not reached its pre-Second World War highs. Eventually the bilateral orange-picking and exporting of both sides continued although without a formal agreement.

At the beginning of 1948 Jaffa's defenders consisted of one company of around 400 men organised by the Muslim Brotherhood, almost none of them Palestinian Arabs (the "Arab Brigade"), and the local Arab irregulars of the National Guard. As in Haifa, the irregulars intimidated the local population.

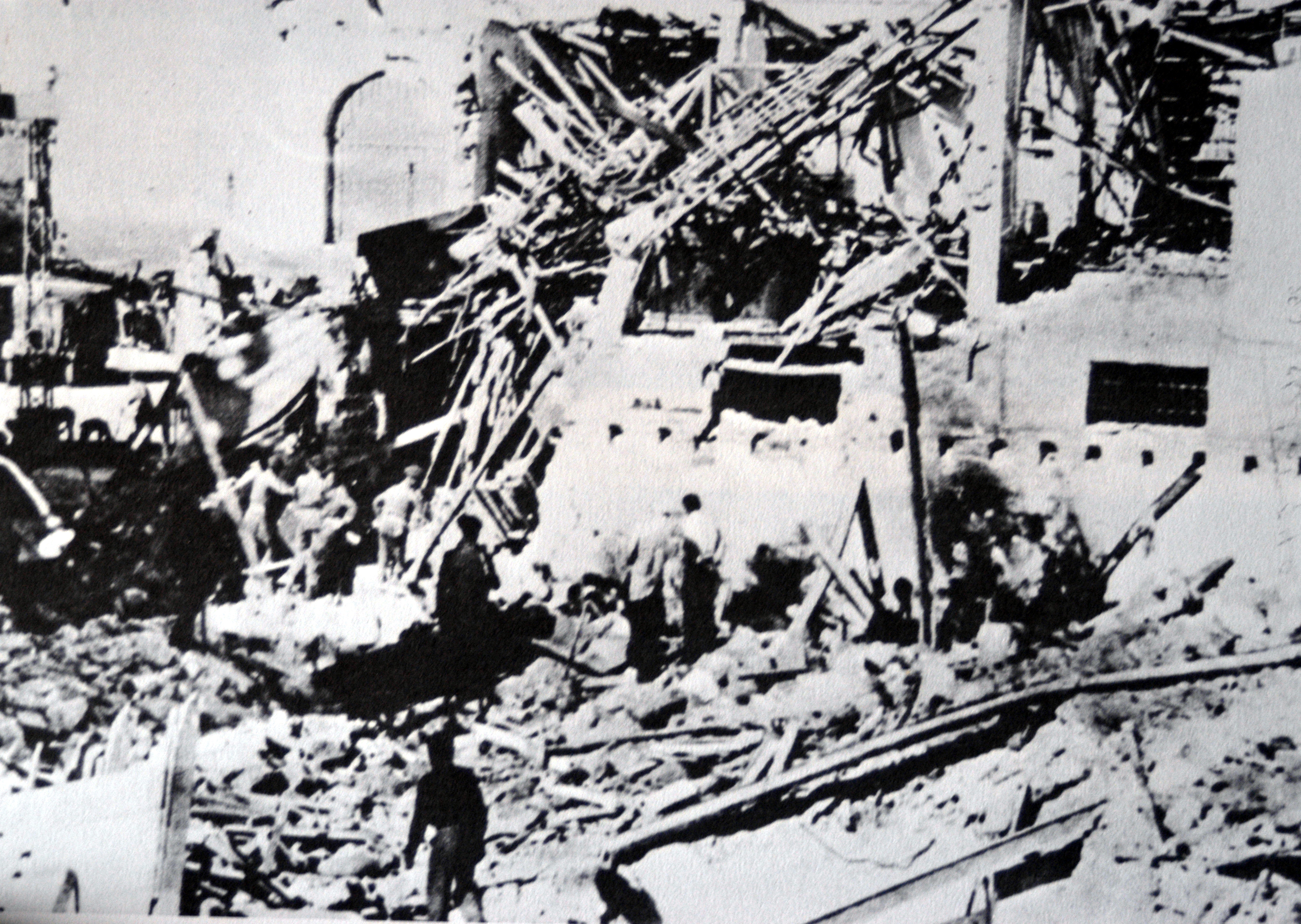
Ruins of the 'Saraya' after the Lehi bomb attack

On 4 January 1948, the Lehi detonated a truck bomb outside the Saraya, also known as the "Grand Serai," formerly the Ottoman administrative building and now housing the Arab National Committee. The building and some nearby buildings were destroyed and twenty-six Palestinian civilians were killed. Most of the dead and many wounded were not connected to the National Committee but were passersby and staff at a food distribution programme for poor children that was also in the same building. Most of the children were not present as it was Sunday.

In February Jaffa's Mayor, Yousef Haikal, contacted David Ben-Gurion through a British intermediary trying to secure a peace agreement with Tel Aviv, but the commander of the Arab militia in Jaffa opposed it. The frontline saw a period of mostly static warfare, with sporadic sniper fire, machine gun bursts, and limited skirmishes. While the introduction of medium mortars in early March 1948 escalated the intensity of the fighting, tactics remained largely unchanged.

On 25 April 1948, the Irgun (IZL) launched an offensive on Jaffa. This began with a mortar bombardment which went on for three days during which twenty tons of high explosive were fired into the town. (Note: Morris 2004: "Begin claimed that the mortarmen were ordered to avoid hitting ‘hospitals, religious sites’ and consulates. But as the IZL’s fire control and ranging were at best amateur, even if restrictions had been imposed, they would have been meaningless. In any case, the objectives of the three-day barrage, in which 20 tons of ordnance were delivered, were clear: ‘To prevent constant military traffic in the city, to break the spirit of the enemy troops, [and] to cause chaos among the civilian population in order to create a mass flight’, is how Amihai Paglin, the IZL head of operations, put it in his pre-attack briefing.") Simultaneously the Haganah had launched Operation Hametz, which overran the villages east of Jaffa and cut the town off from the interior. On 27 April the British Government, fearing a repetition of the mass exodus from Haifa the week before, ordered the British Army to confront the Irgun in battle and their offensive ended. On 29 April, the Irgun commander for the Tel-Aviv & Jaffa district, Eliyahu Tamler, was killed by a British shell. British High Commissioner for Palestine, Alan Cunningham stated that "It should be made clear that IZL attack with mortars was indiscriminate and designed to create panic among the civilian inhabitants."

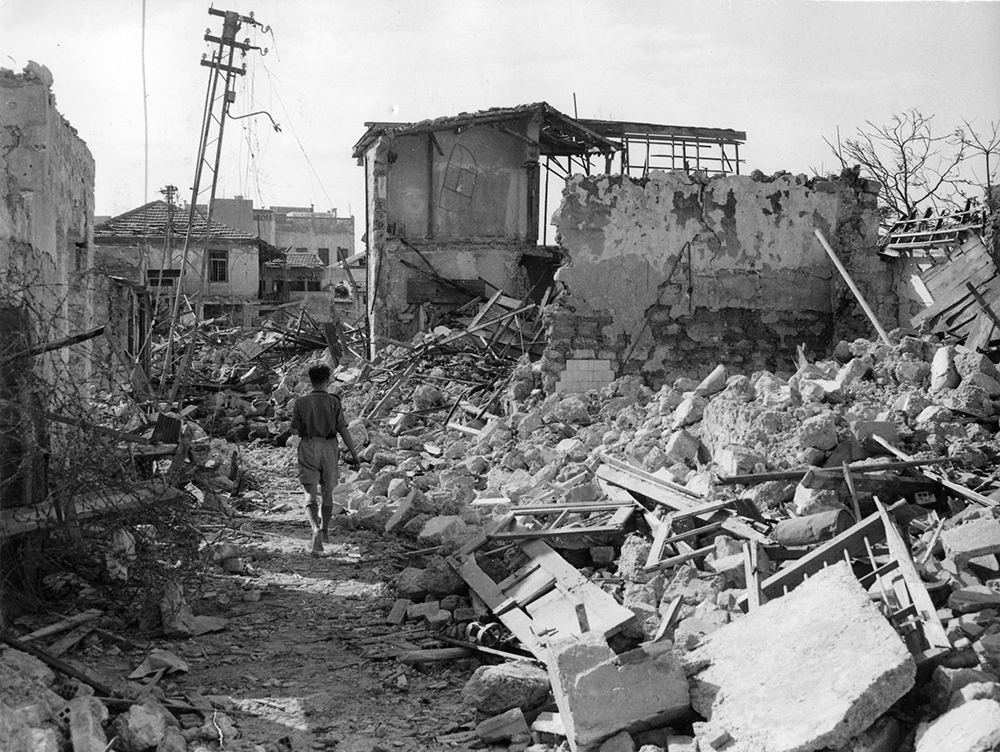
Destruction in the Manshiya neighbourhood of Jaffa, May 1948.

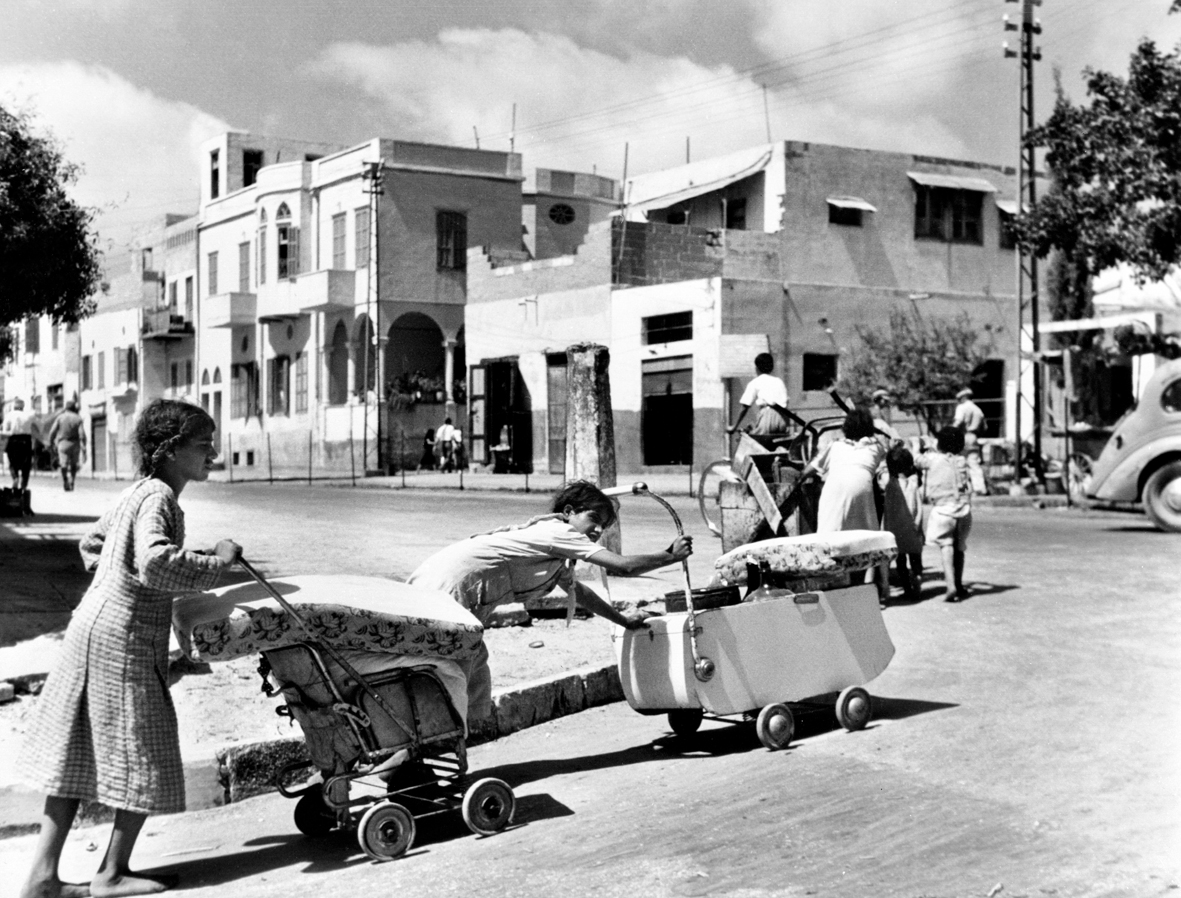
Palestinian refugees fleeing the city.

The Irgun bombing of Jaffa, whose casualties were mostly civilians, (Note: Morris 2004: "most of the casualties were civilians, according to Haganah intelligence.") combined with the fall of Haifa a few days earlier and fear of another massacre similar to the Irgun's Deir Yassin massacre, caused panic amongst the Arab population of Jaffa, and most of them eventually fled the city. An Irgun intelligence report from 28 April stated that their bombardment of the city had "stopped the movement of buses to Jaffa and in it and paralyzed completely the supply of food to the city and in it. Hotels turned into hospitals. The shelling caused great panic. The port filled up with masses of refugees and the boarding of boats took place in confusion." The population of Jaffa on the eve of the attack was between 50,000 and 60,000, with some 20,000 people having already left the town. By 30 April, there were 15,000–25,000 remaining. In the following days a further 10,000–20,000 people fled by sea. When the Haganah took control of the town on 14 May around 4,000 people were left. The town and harbour's warehouses were extensively looted. The displacement of Jaffa's Arab population was part of the larger 1948 Palestinian expulsion and flight.

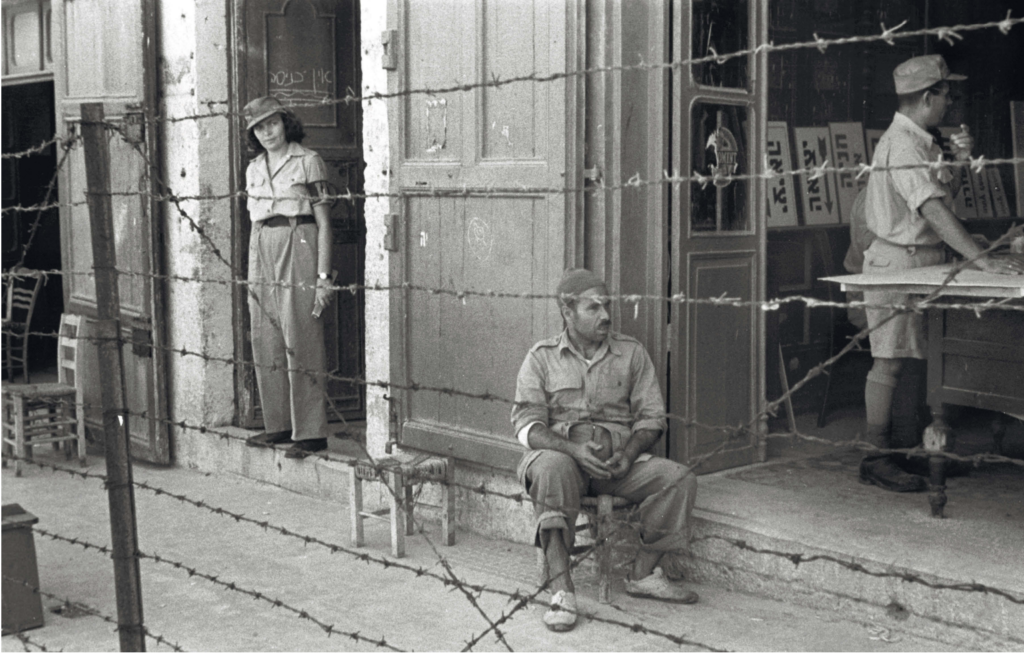
Barbed-wire separating the Arab neighbourhood, or "ghetto", of Ajami in 1948

The city surrendered to the Haganah on 14 May 1948 and shortly after the British police and army left the city. Israeli historian Benny Morris writes that "There was widespread institutional and private looting by Haganah and IZL troops and Tel Aviv citizens who infiltrated the town, there was robbery on the roads by patrolling Jewish troops (with ‘watches, rings, cash, etc.’ taken) and there was widespread vandalisation of property." The 3,800 Arabs who remained in Jaffa after the exodus were concentrated in the Ajami district and subject to strict martial law. The military administration in Jaffa lasted until 1 June 1949, at which point, Tel Aviv Municipality took over the administration; Jaffa Municipality, de-jure still in existence at the time, had not exercised any authority since 1948 until its dissolution in 1950.

=== State of Israel ===
==== Gradual annexation into Tel Aviv ====
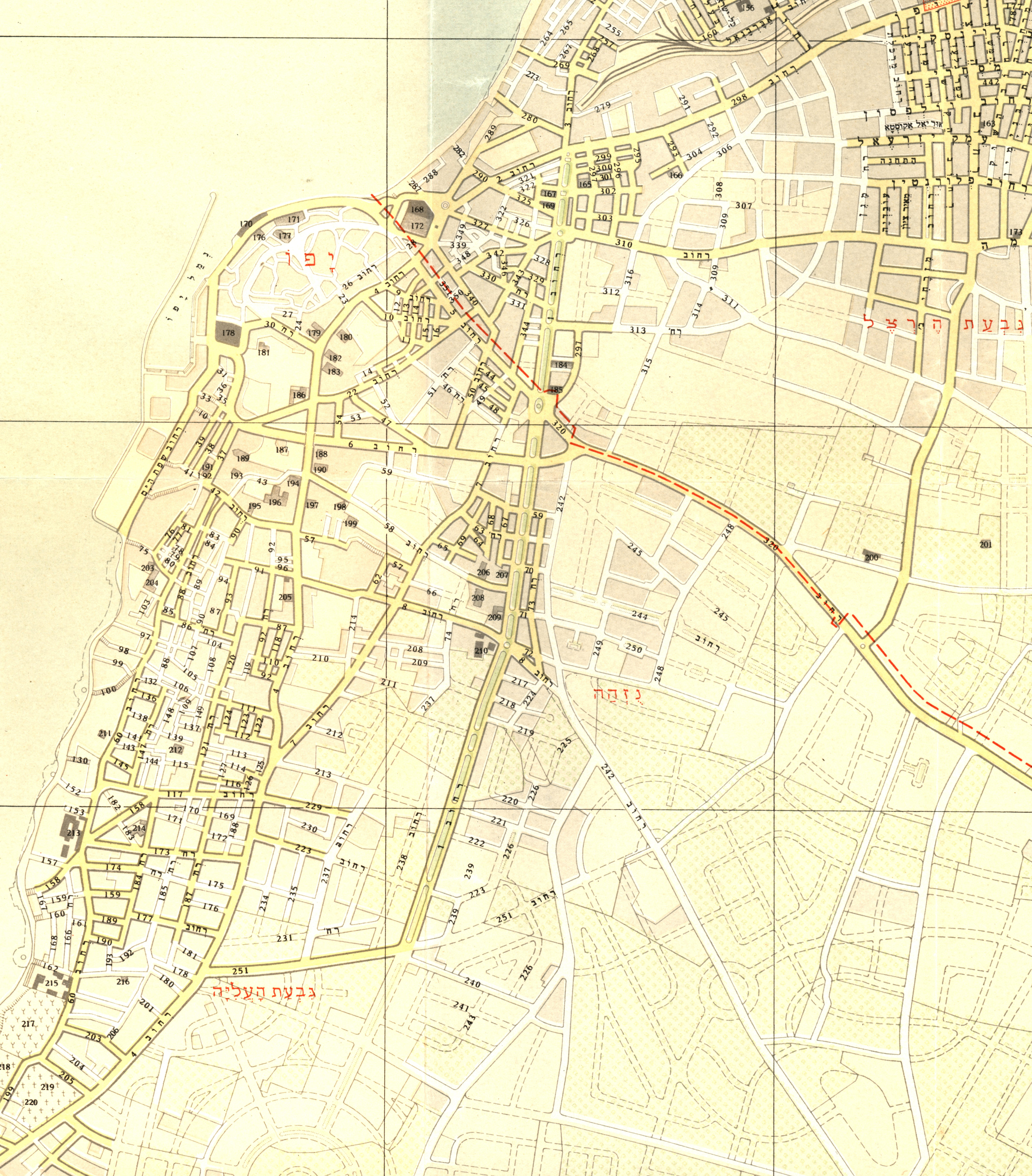
Last Tel Aviv–Jaffa border (1949); no street names in Jaffa at that time

The boundaries of Tel Aviv and Jaffa became a matter of contention between the Tel Aviv municipality and the Israeli government during 1948. The former wished to incorporate only the well-off Jewish suburbs in the north of Jaffa, while the latter wanted a more complete unification. The issue also had international sensitivity, since the main part of Jaffa was in the Arab portion of the United Nations Partition Plan, whereas Tel Aviv was not, and no armistice agreements had yet been signed. An alternative proposal, merging Bat Yam and Holon into Jaffa to form a bigger city south of Tel Aviv, was rejected on financial grounds, as the two small Jewish settlements lacked the funds necessary to sustain Jaffa.

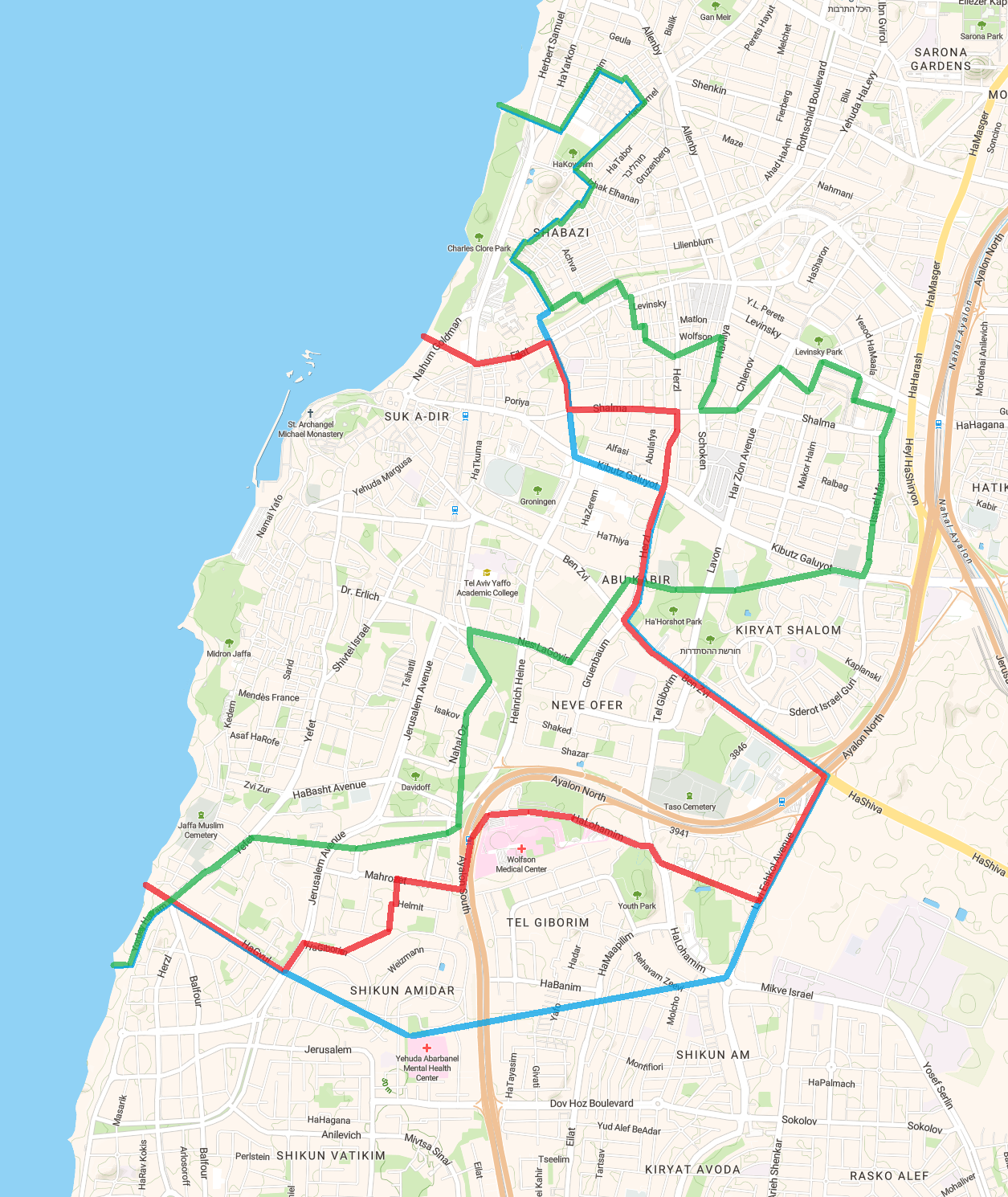
Red: current boundary (as of 2022); blue: UN proposed enclave (1947); green: historic boundary (as of 1944)

On 10 December 1948, the government announced the annexation to Tel Aviv of Jaffa's Jewish suburbs of Maccabi (American–German Colony), Volovelsky (northwestern Florentin), Giv'at Herzl, and Shapira; territories outside Jaffa's municipal boundary, specifically the Arab neighbourhood of Abu Kabir, the Arab village of Salama and some of its agricultural land, and the working class Jewish areas of Hatikva and Ezra, were annexed to Tel Aviv at the same time, thus introducing around 50,000 new residents into the city. On 18 May 1949, the new boundary was drawn along Shari' Es Salahi (now Olei Zion Street) and Shari' El Quds (now Ben-Zvi Road), thereby adding into Tel Aviv the former Arab neighbourhood of Manshiya and part of Jaffa city centre, for the first time including land that had been in the Arab portion of the UN partition plan. The government decided on a permanent unification of Tel Aviv and Jaffa on 4 October 1949, but the actual unification was delayed until 16 June 1950 due to concerted opposition from Tel Aviv's mayor Israel Rokach, who had demanded government funding of 1M I£ towards the expenses of providing municipal services to Jaffa. Jaffa was expected to consume 18% of the unified municipality's budget, while contributing only 4% of its income. The two sides came to an agreement under which the government covered 100K I£ of the unified municipality's expenses, as well as funded healthcare, education, and social services for Jaffa residents directly from the state budget. The name of the unified city was Tel Aviv until 19 August 1950, when it was renamed as Tel Aviv–Yafo in order to preserve the historical name Jaffa. The population of Jaffa prior to the unification was estimated as 40,000, out of them 5,000 Arabs, and most of the others new olim.

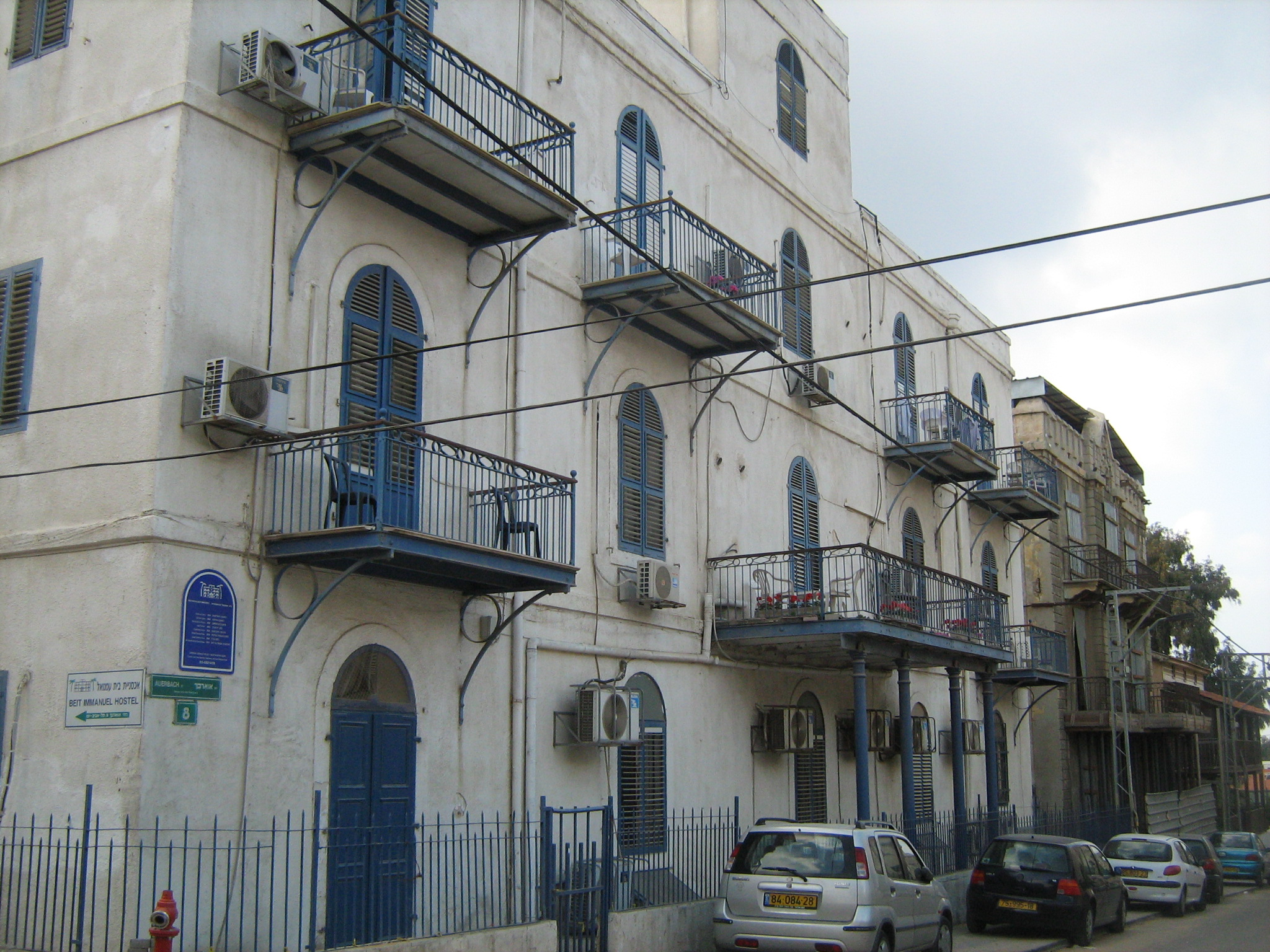
Former Hotel du Parc in Jaffa's American Colony

The land which had formerly belonged to Jaffa municipality, and was annexed into Tel Aviv, includes the neighbourhoods of Manshiya, Florentin, Giv'at Herzl, and Shapira; and such landmarks as Charles Clore Park, Hassan Bek Mosque, Carmel Market, the former Jaffa railway station, and the new Tel Aviv central bus station. On the other hand, Jaffa boundaries were expanded to the southeast, incorporating Gaon Stadium and the new neighbourhoods of Neve Ofer, Jaffa Gimel and Jaffa Dalet. Other former Arab villages incorporated into Tel Aviv–Jaffa include Al-Mas'udiyya, annexed on 20 December 1942, in the New North; Jarisha, annexed on 25 November 1943, on the southern bank of Yarkon River; Al-Jammasin al-Gharbi, annexed on 31 March 1948, and since 1957 redeveloped into Bavli neighbourhood; and Al-Shaykh Muwannis, annexed on 25 February 1949, and since 1955 redeveloped into Tel Aviv University main campus.

Streets renamed

After the Jewish takeover, all pre-existing street names in Jaffa were abolished, and replaced with numeric identifiers. By 1954, only the four main streets had proper names: Jerusalem (former Djemal Pasha; then King George V; then No.1) Avenue; Tarshish (former Bustrus; then No.2; now David Raziel) Street; Eilat Street (former No.298); and Shalma Road (former No.310).

The road passing between Florentin and Neve Tzedek neighbourhoods was until 1948 named Tel Aviv Road, being the main thoroughfare between the two city centres. After the annexation of Florentin into Tel Aviv, it became an internal road in Tel Aviv, so its name no longer made sense. Thus the section lying within the new Tel Aviv boundaries was renamed into Jaffa Road; and the section which became the new Tel Aviv–Jaffa boundary, into Eilat Street.

Salama Road, a main eastwards road from Jaffa towards the depopulated village of Salama, was renamed Shalma Road after the reconstructed Hebrew name of Capharsalama (Greek: Χαφαρσαλαμα) which is mentioned in 1 Maccabees 7:31 as the location of the battle of Caphar-salama. However, both names remain in use.

Arabic street names were eventually replaced with Hebrew ones, e.g. Al-Kutub Street was renamed Resh Galuta Street, Abu Ubeyda Street was renamed She’erit Yisra’el Street, and Al-Salahi Street was renamed Olei Zion Street. This practice has been criticised by residents of affected Arabic neighbourhoods, who deem the names inappropriate (for example, a street named after Rabbi Simcha Bunim of Peshischa was called a "local laughingstock" by Tel Aviv-Jaffa city councillor Ahmed Belha; and a street where the Al Siksik Mosque is located was renamed Beit Eshel Street, after a short-lived Jewish settlement in what is now Beersheba) and demand a return to Arabic names.

==== Urban development ====
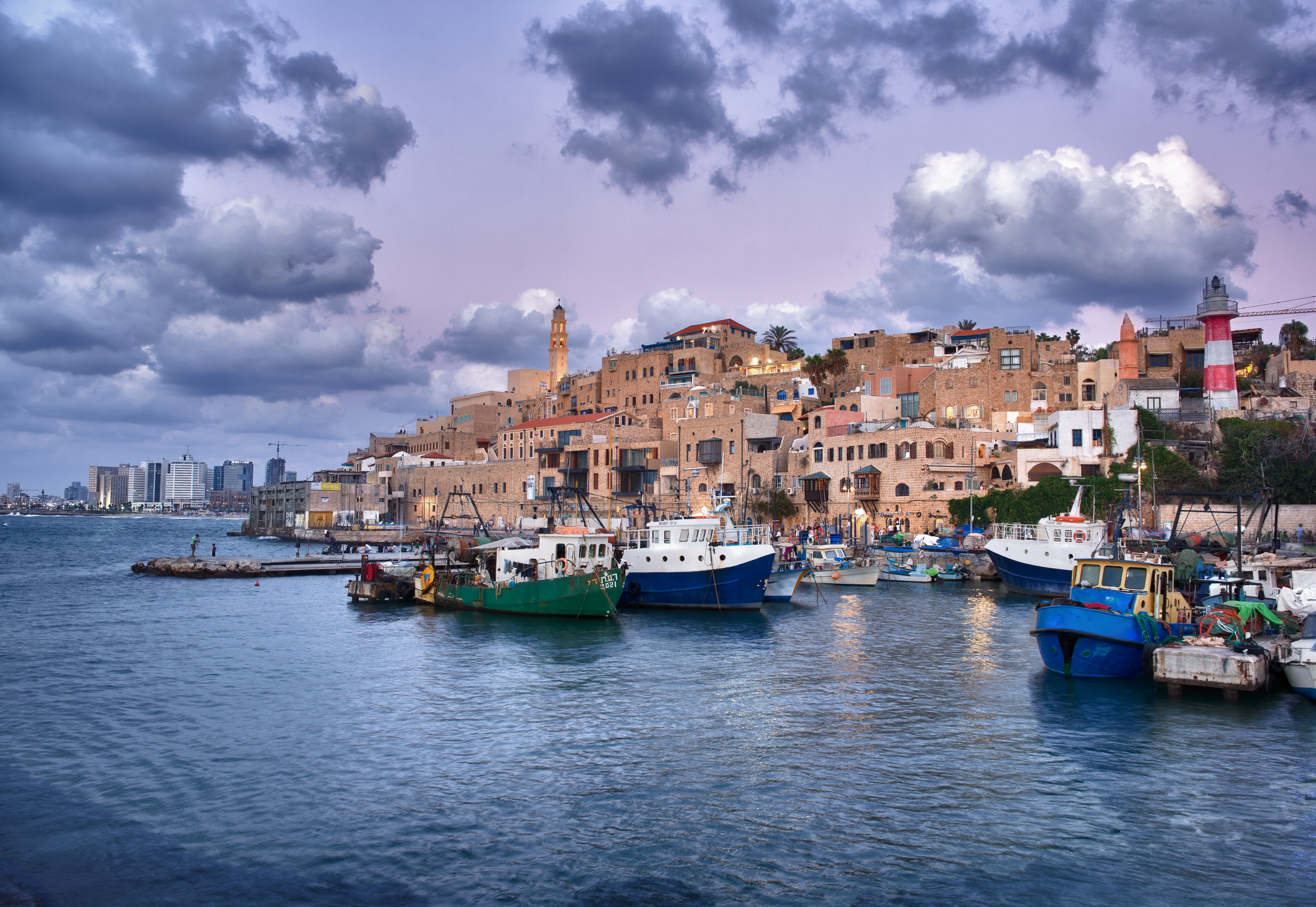
Jaffa Port

From the 1990s onwards, efforts have been made to restore Arab and Islamic landmarks, such as the Mosque of the Sea and Hassan Bek Mosque, and document the history of Jaffa's Arab population.

Parts of the Old City have been renovated, turning Jaffa into a tourist attraction featuring old restored buildings, art galleries, theatres, souvenir shops, restaurants, sidewalk cafes and promenades. Many artists have moved their studios from Tel Aviv to the Old City and its surroundings, such as the Jaffa port, the American–Germany Colony and the flea market. Beyond the Old City and tourist sites, many neighbourhoods of Jaffa are poor and underdeveloped. However, real-estate prices have risen sharply due to gentrification projects in Ajami, Noga, and Lev Yafo. The municipality of Tel Aviv–Yafo is currently working to beautify and modernise the port area.

== Demography ==
Modern Jaffa has a heterogeneous population of Jews, Christians, and Muslims. As of 2021, Jaffa has 52,470 residents, about a third of which are Arabs.

== Landmarks ==
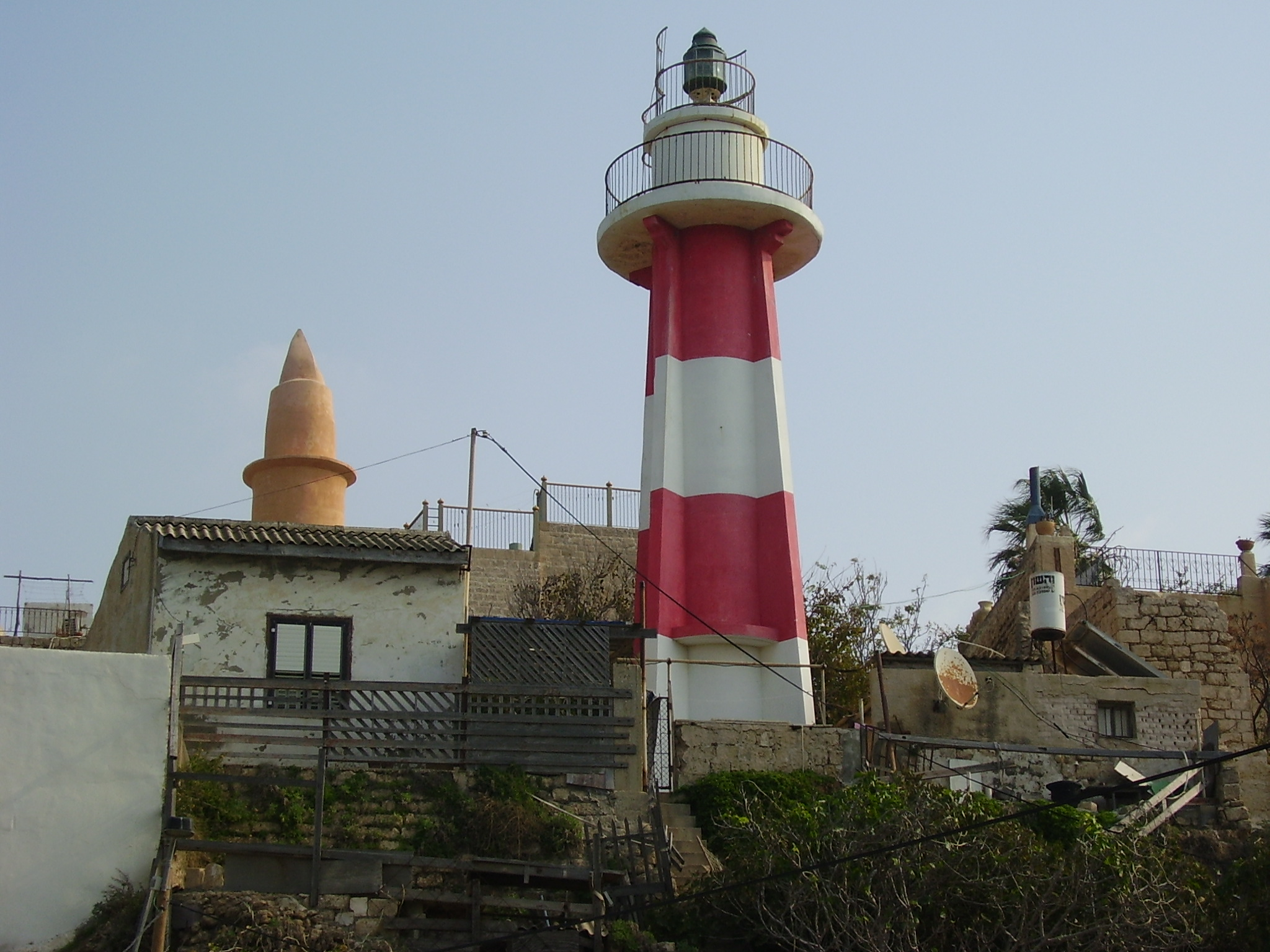
Jaffa Light

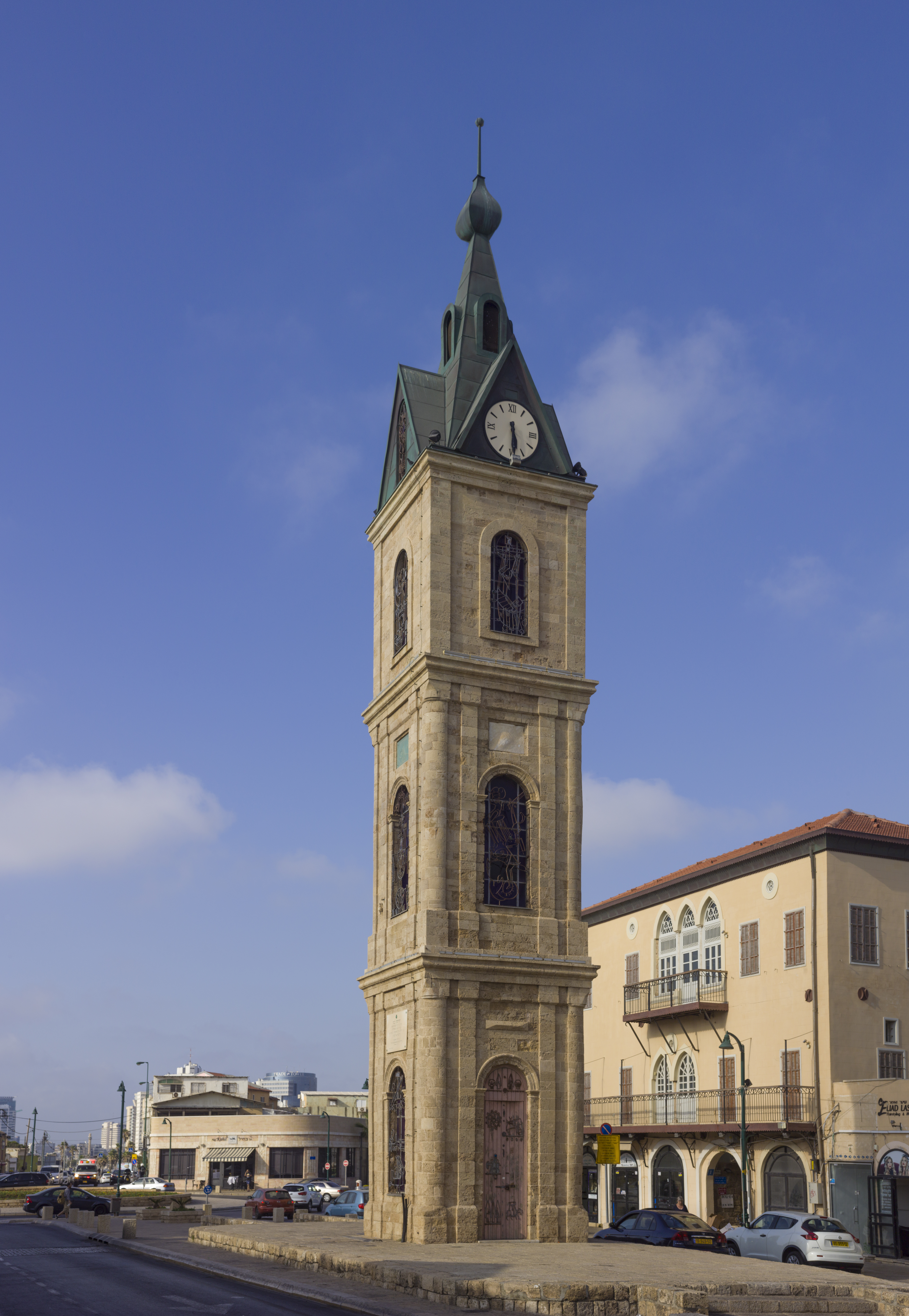
Jaffa clock tower

The Clock Square with its distinctive clocktower was built in 1906 in honour of Sultan Abdul Hamid II. The Saraya (governor's palace) was built in the 1890s. Andromeda rock is the rock to which beautiful Andromeda was chained in Greek mythology. The Zodiac alleys are a maze of restored alleys leading to the harbour. Jaffa Hill is a centre for archaeological finds, including restored Egyptian gates, about 3,500 years old. Jaffa Lighthouse is an inactive lighthouse located in the old port.

The Jaffa Museum of Antiquities is located in an 18th-century Ottoman building constructed on the remains of a Crusader fortress. In 1811, Abu Nabout turned it into his seat of government. In the late 19th century, the governmental moved to the "New Saraya," and the building was sold to a wealthy Greek-Orthodox family who established a soap factory there. Since 1961, it has housed an archaeological museum, which is currently closed to the general public.

The Libyan Synagogue (Beit Zunana) was a synagogue built by a Jewish landlord, Zunana, in the 18th century. It was turned into a hotel and then a soap factory, and reopened as a synagogue for Libyan Jewish immigrants after 1948. In 1995, it became a museum.

Other museums and galleries in the area include the Farkash Gallery collection.

=== Churches and monasteries ===
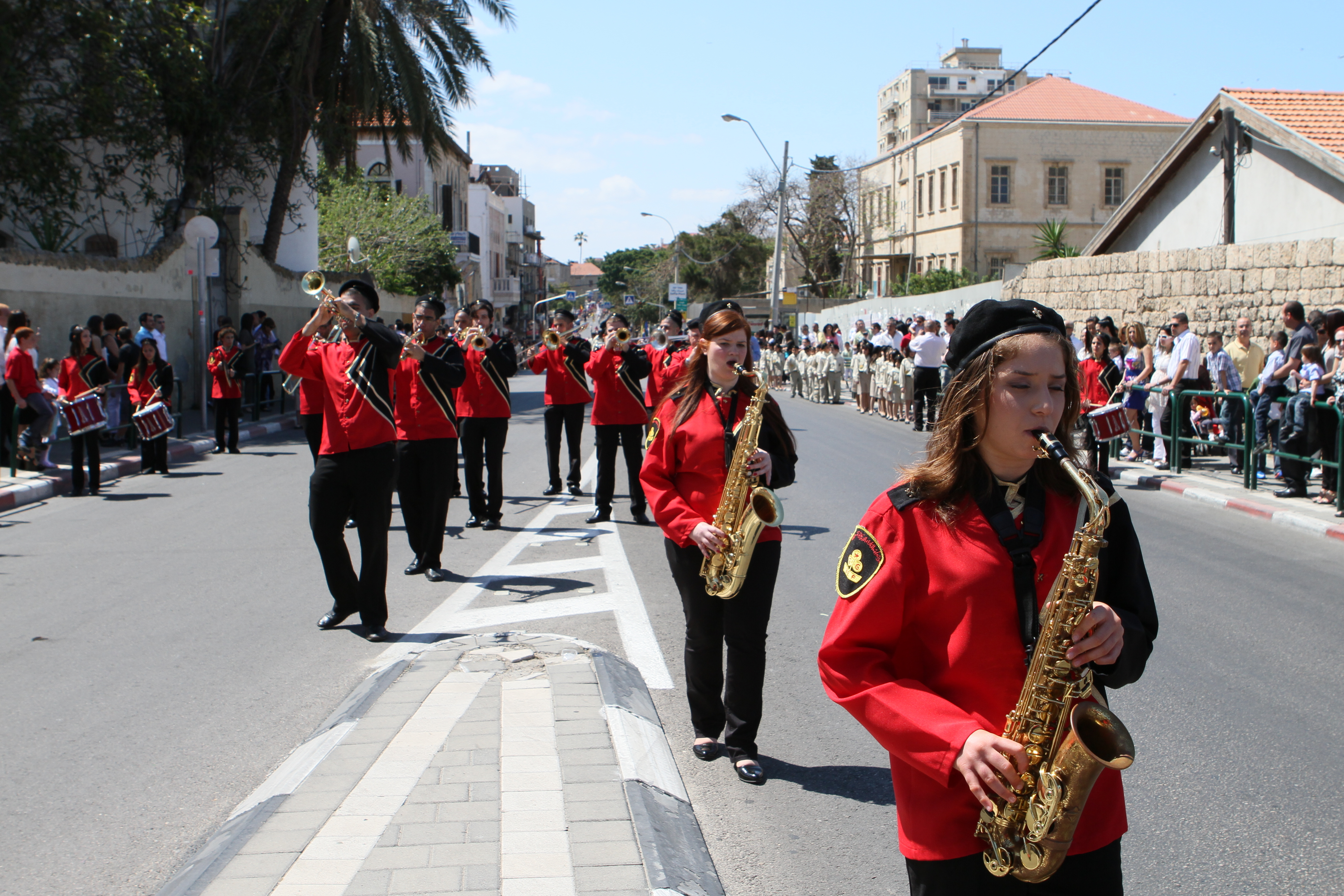
Easter parade in Jaffa, 2011

The Greek Orthodox Monastery of Archangel Michael (Patriarchate of Jerusalem) near Jaffa Port also has Romanian and Russian communities in its compound. Built in 1894, the Church of St. Peter and St. Tabitha serves the Russian Orthodox Christian community, with services in Russian and Hebrew; underneath the chapel nearby there is what is believed to be the tomb of St Tabitha. St. Peter's Church is a Franciscan Roman-Catholic basilica and hospice built in 1654 on the remains of a Crusader fortress, and commemorates St Peter, as he brought the disciple Tabitha back from the dead; Napoleon is believed to have stayed there.

Immanuel Church, built 1904, serves today a Lutheran congregation with services in English and Hebrew.

The Saint Nicholas Armenian Monastery was built in the 17th century.

=== Mosques ===
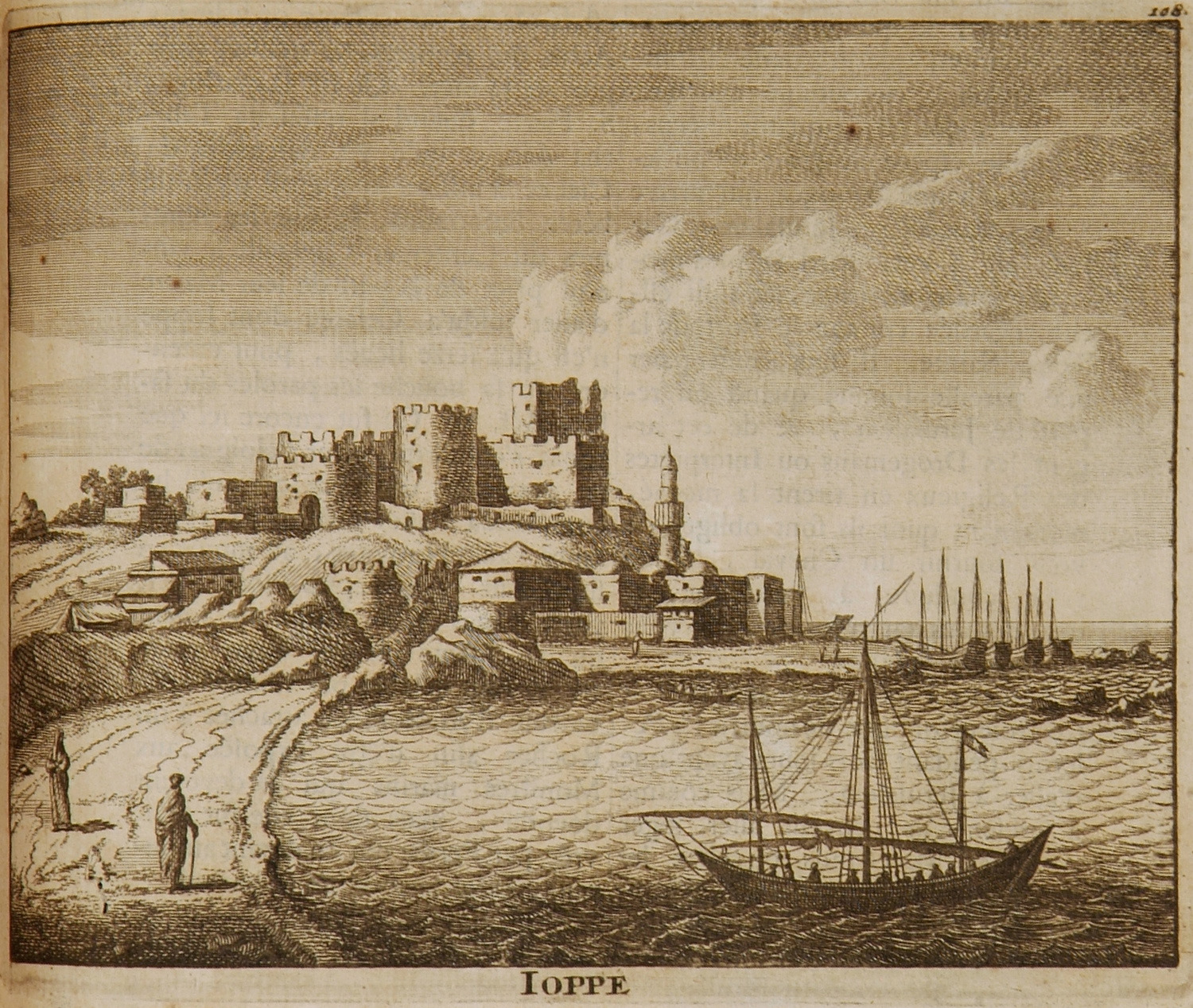
Jaffa, by Cornelis de Bruijn, c. 1675

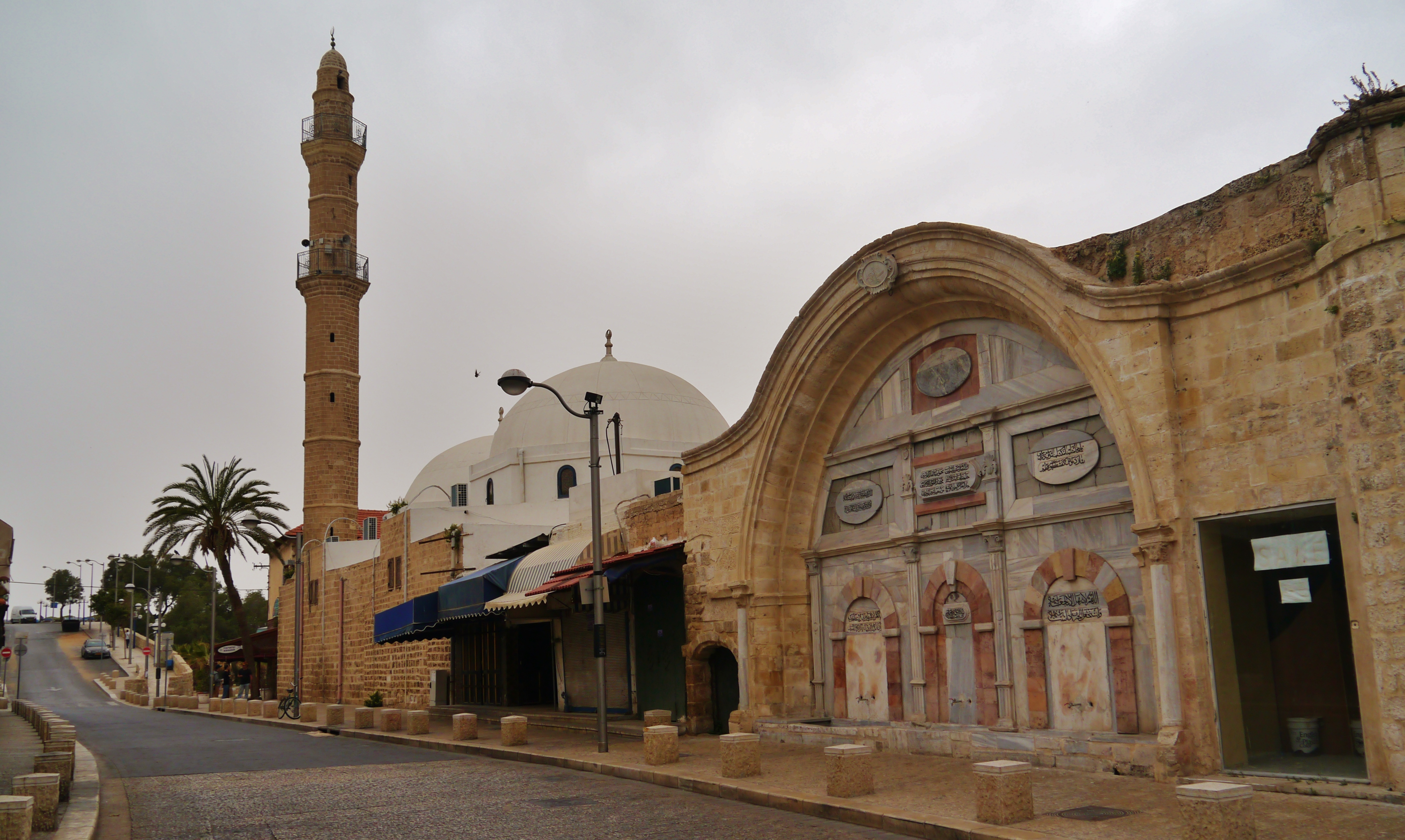
Mahmoudiya Mosque is largest mosque in Tel Aviv

Al-Bahr Mosque, lit. the Sea Mosque, overlooking the harbour, is depicted in a painting from 1675 by the Dutch painter Cornelis de Bruijn. It may be Jaffa's oldest existing mosque. Built originally in 1675, changes to the structure have been made since then, such as the addition of a second floor and reconstruction of the upper part of the minaret. It was used by fishermen and sailors frequenting the port, and residents of the surrounding area. According to local legend, the wives of sailors living in Jaffa prayed there for the safe return of their husbands. The mosque was renovated in 1997.

Mahmoudia Mosque was built in 1812 by Abu Nabbut, governor of Jaffa from 1810 to 1820. Outside the mosque is a water fountain (sabil) for pilgrims.

Nouzha Mosque on Jerusalem Boulevard is Jaffa's main mosque today.

== Archaeology ==
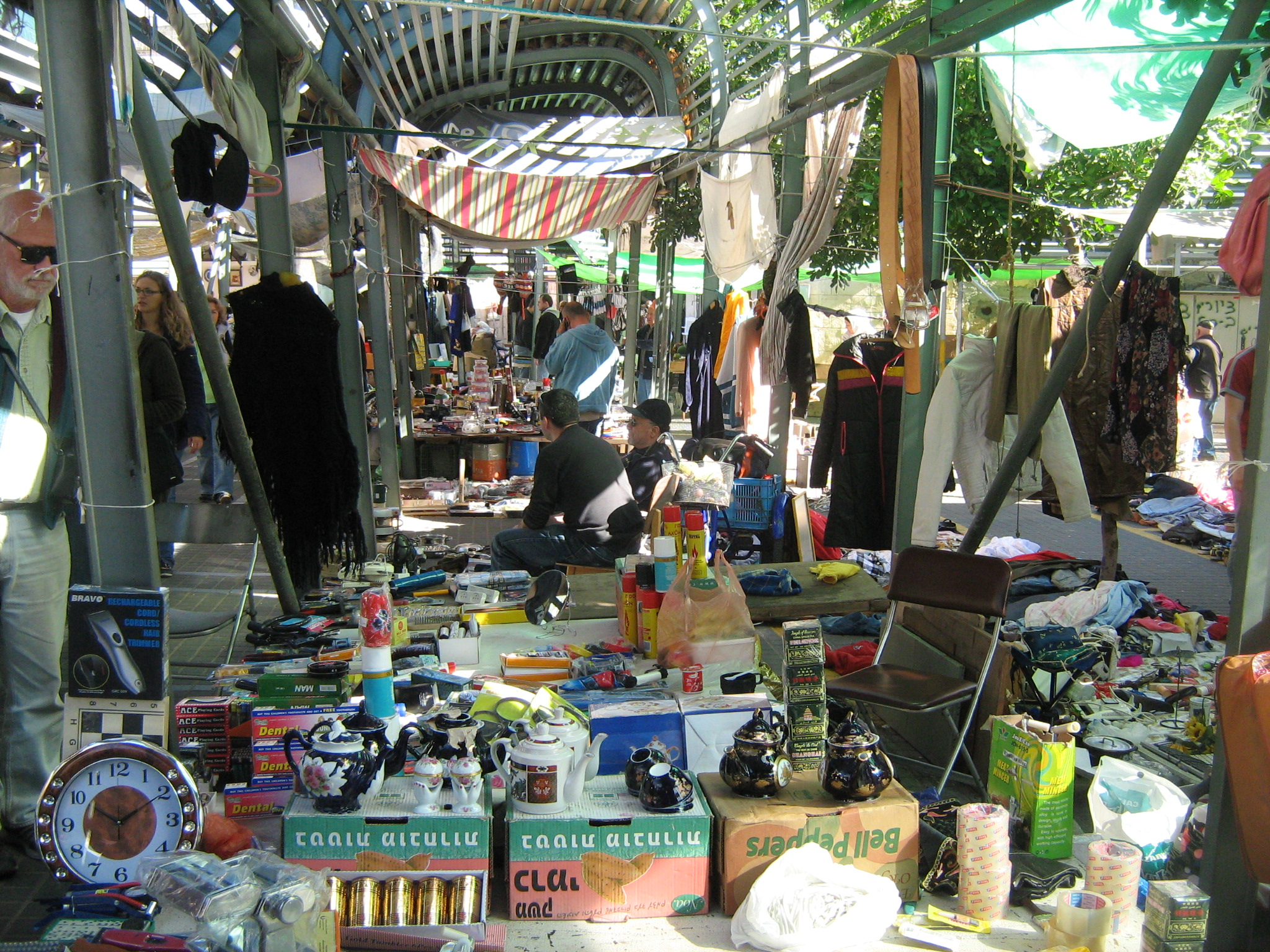
Jaffa flea market

The majority of excavations in Jaffa are salvage in nature and have been conducted by the Israel Antiquities Authority (IAA) since the 1990s. Excavations on Rabbi Pinchas Street, for example, in the flea market have revealed walls and water conduits dating to the Iron Age, Hellenistic, Early Islamic, Crusader and Ottoman periods. A limestone slab (50 cm × 50 cm or 20 in × 20 in) engraved with a menorah discovered on Tanchum Street is believed to be the door of a tomb.

Additional efforts to conduct research excavations at that site included those of B. J. Isserlin (1950), Ze'ev Herzog of Tel Aviv University (1997–1999), and most recently the Jaffa Cultural Heritage Project (since 2007), directed by Aaron A. Burke (UCLA) and Martin Peilstocker (Johannes Gutenberg University).

In December 2020, archaeologists from the IAA revealed a 3,800-year-old jar containing the badly preserved remains of a baby dates back to the Middle Bronze Age. "There's always the interpretation that the jar is almost like a womb, so basically the idea is to return [the] baby back into Mother Earth, or into the symbolic protection of his mother", said archaeologist Alfredo Mederos Martin. Researchers also covered the remains of at least two horses and pottery dated to the late Ottoman Empire, 232 seashells, 30 Hellenistic coins, 95 glass vessel fragments from the Roman and Crusader periods 14 fifth-century BCE rock-carved burials featuring lamps.

== Education ==
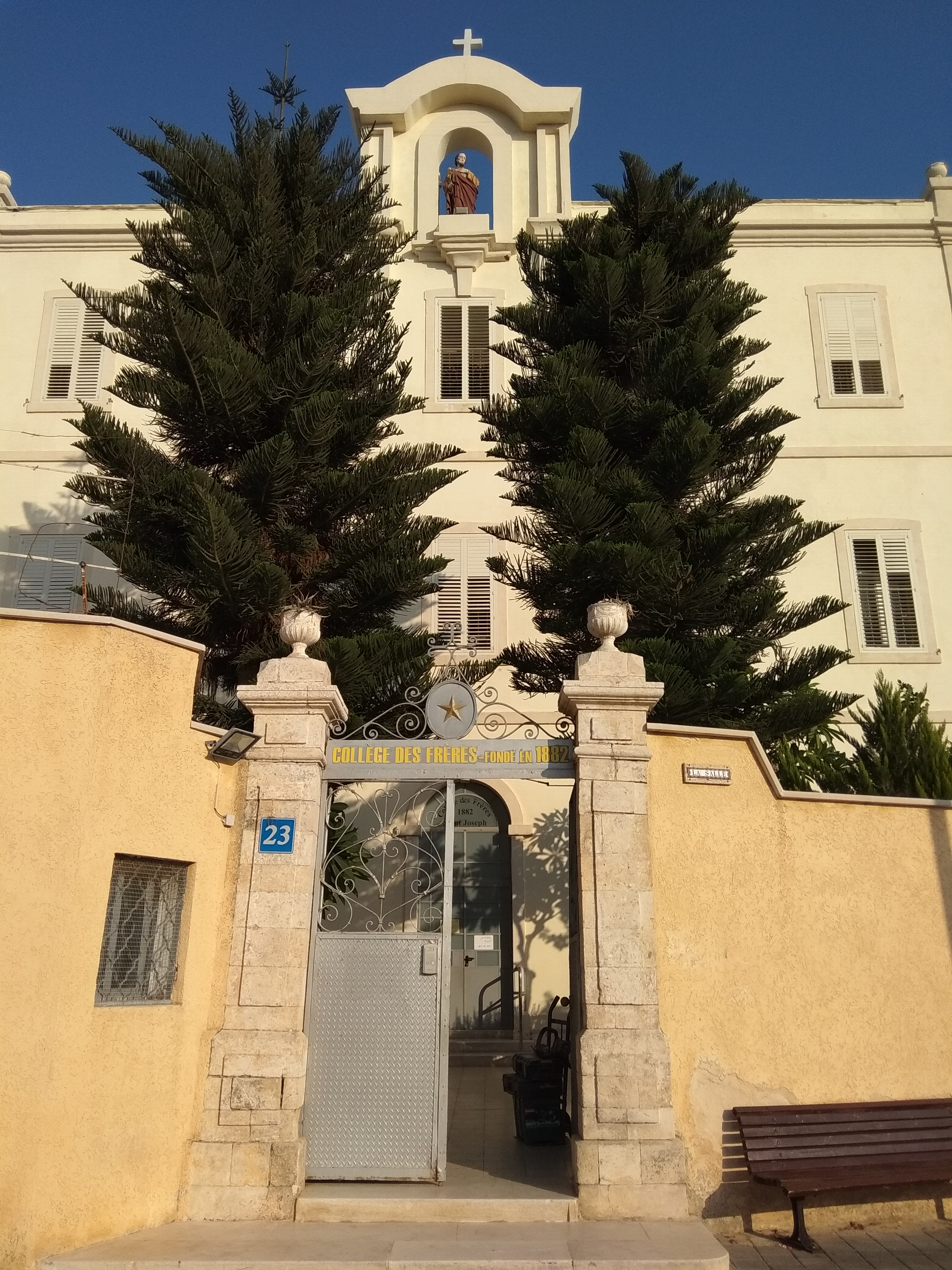
Collège des Frères de Jaffa

Collège des Frères de Jaffa is a French international school.

Tabeetha School in Jaffa was founded in 1863. It is owned by the Church of Scotland. The school provides education in English to children from Christian, Jewish and Muslim backgrounds.

Muzot (Hebrew: מוזות) is an arts school in old Jaffa that caters to teenagers who haven't successfully integrated into traditional schools. It offers them a unique opportunity to combine artistic pursuits with academic studies leading to a matriculation certificate.

The democratic school in Jaffa established in 2004 is based on the ideas of democratic education, catering students from 1st to 12th grade.

The campus of the Academic College of Tel Aviv-Yafo is a public college, hosting more than 4500 Israeli and Arab students. The college's faculties include computer science, economics and management, information systems, psychology and nursing.

== Local governance, politics ==
Administratively, Jaffa constitutes Borough 7 of the Tel Aviv-Yafo Municipality, and is divided into four sub-boroughs and twelve neighbourhoods.

Compared to Tel Aviv-Yafo as a whole, votes for Arab parties are especially prevalent in Jaffa in national elections. In the 2018 Tel Aviv-Jaffa city council election, the Yafa list, which represents the Arab population of Jaffa, received 28% of the vote in Jaffa, making it the most voted party there; the second place was taken by the Hadash-affiliated We are the City list, with 14% of the vote. Among Jewish political parties, right-wing parties such as Shas and Likud perform better in Jaffa relative to the municipality-wide results, similarly to the working-class neighbourhoods in southern Tel Aviv; in particular, Shas received 12% of the vote in Jaffa in the 2018 city council elections, making it the third-most voted for party in Jaffa.

=== Socioeconomic and political problems ===
Jaffa suffers from drug problems, high crime rates and violence. Some Arab residents have alleged that the Israeli authorities are attempting to Judaize Jaffa by evicting Arab residents from houses owned by the Amidar government-operated public housing company. Amidar representatives say the residents are illegal squatters.

== Transportation ==
=== Ottoman station, now leisure venue ===
Jaffa Railway Station was the first railway station in the Levant. It served as the terminus for the Jaffa–Jerusalem railway. The station opened in 1891 and closed in 1948. In 2005–09, the station was restored and converted into an entertainment and leisure venue marketed as "HaTachana", Hebrew for "the station".

=== Bus and tramway (light rail) ===
Jaffa is served by the Dan Bus Company, which operates buses to various neighbourhoods of Tel Aviv and Bat Yam.

The Red Line of the Tel Aviv Light Rail, inaugurated in 2023, crosses Jaffa north to south along Jerusalem Boulevard.

=== Railway ===
Of the current stations in the Israel Railways network, the Holon Junction and Holon–Wolfson railway stations sit on the boundary between Jaffa and Holon, while Tel Aviv HaHagana is in Tel Aviv proper, slightly to the east of Jaffa.

== In popular culture ==
Jaffa cakes, a British confection, are named after Jaffa oranges and are therefore indirectly a namesake of Jaffa.

The Knight Of Jaffa is the second episode of the Doctor Who story The Crusade (1965), set in Palestine during the Third Crusade. The 1981 film Clash of the Titans is set in ancient Joppa. The 2009 Oscar-nominated film Ajami is set in modern Jaffa.

== Notable residents ==
- Asma Agbarieh (born 1974), Israeli Arab journalist and political activist
- Hanan Al-Agha (1948–2008), Palestinian plastic artist
- Shmuel Yosef Agnon (1888–1970), Nobel Prize-winning author
- Dahn Ben-Amotz (1924–1989), radio broadcaster and author
- Yitzhak Ben-Zvi (1884–1963), historian, Labor Zionist leader, and President of Israel
- Benny Hinn (born 1953), TV evangelist and preacher
- Yosef Eliyahu Chelouche (1870–1934), one of the founders of Tel Aviv; businessman
- Joseph Constant (1892–1969), sculptor and writer
- George Deek (born 1984), Israeli Arab diplomat
- Ismail al-Faruqi (1921–1986), Palestinian-American philosopher
- Lea Gottlieb (1918–2012), Israeli founder and fashion designer of Gottex
- Ibtisam Mara'ana (born 1975), Arab-Israeli filmmaker and member of the Knesset
- Victor Norris Hamilton (born c. 1919), Palestinian-born American cryptologist
- J. E. Hanauer (1850–1938), author, photographer, and Canon of St George's Church
- Hilmi Hanoun (1913–2001), writer and politician
- Yizhar Harari (1908–1978), Zionist activist and Israeli politician
- Haim Hazan (1937–1994), Israeli basketball player
- Zeev Hershkowitz, former Israeli footballer
- Nadia Hilou (1953–2015), Arab-Israeli politician
- Pinhas Hozez (born 1957), Israeli basketball player
- Issa El-Issa (1878–1950), Palestinian journalist
- Daoud El-Issa (1903–1983), Palestinian journalist
- Yousef El-Issa (1870–1948), Palestinian journalist
- Raja El-Issa (1922–2008), Palestinian journalist
- Michel Loève (1907–1979), probabilist and mathematical statistician
- Haim Ramon (born 1950), Israeli politician
- Sasha Roiz (born 1973), Canadian actor
- Yoav Saffar (born 1975), Israeli basketball player
- Yosef Sapir (1902–1972), Israeli politician
- Haim Starkman (born 1944), Israeli basketball player
- Rifaat Turk (born 1954), Arab-Israeli football player and manager, and deputy mayor of Tel Aviv

== See also ==
- Bonaparte Visiting the Plague Victims of Jaffa
- County of Jaffa and Ascalon (under the Crusaders)
- History of Palestinian journalism

== Bibliography ==
- Barron, J. B., ed. (1923). Palestine: Report and General Abstracts of the Census of 1922. Government of Palestine.
- Burke, Aaron A. (2011). Early Jaffa: From the Bronze Age to the Persian Period. In: Peilstöcker, Martin; Burke, Aaron A., eds. (2011). The History and Archaeology of Jaffa 1. Los Angeles: The Cotsen Institute of Archaeology Press. ISBN 978-1931745819.
- Chelouche, Y.E. (2005). Arashat Hayai: 1870–1930 (English: Reminiscences of My Life: 1870–1930) (in Hebrew). Tel Aviv: Babel. ISBN 965-512-096-1. OCLC 62317894.
- Danielson, Andrew J.; Burke, Aaron A.; Peilstöcker, Martin; Kowalski, Krister; Maher, Edward F. (2020). "Persian and Hellenistic Jaffa: Re-Examining Jacob Kaplan's Excavations in Area A (1970–1974)". Ancient Near Eastern Studies. 57: 187–257. doi:10.2143/ANES.57.0.3288617.
- Department of Statistics (1945). Village Statistics, April, 1945. Government of Palestine.
- Hadawi, S. (1970). Village Statistics of 1945: A Classification of Land and Area ownership in Palestine. Palestine Liberation Organization Research Center.
- Herzog, Ze'ev (2024). "Chapter 2: Stratigraphy and Architecture". In Edrey, Meir; Gross, Boaz; Herog, Ze'ev (eds.). The Tel Aviv University Excavations in Ancient Jaffa: Vol 1. Tel Aviv University Institute of Archaeology. pp. 15–50. ISBN 978-965-266-074-9.
- Hütteroth, W.-D.; Abdulfattah, K. (1977). Historical Geography of Palestine, Transjordan and Southern Syria in the Late 16th Century. Erlanger Geographische Arbeiten, Sonderband 5. Erlangen, Germany: Vorstand der Fränkischen Geographischen Gesellschaft. ISBN 3-920405-41-2.
- Lebor, Adam (2007). City of Oranges. Arabs and Jews in Jaffa. New York: W.W. Norton & Co. ISBN 978-0-7475-8602-9.
- Levine, Mark (2005). Overthrowing Geography, Jaffa, Tel Aviv, and the Struggle for Palestine, 1880–1948. Berkeley: University of California Press. ISBN 0-520-23994-6.
- Le Strange, G. (1890). Palestine Under the Moslems: A Description of Syria and the Holy Land from A.D. 650 to 1500. London: Committee of the Palestine Exploration Fund. OCLC 1004386.
- Mills, E., ed. (1932). Census of Palestine 1931. Population of Villages, Towns and Administrative Areas. Jerusalem: Government of Palestine.
- Morris, B. (1987). The Birth of the Palestinian Refugee Problem, 1947–1949. Cambridge: Cambridge University Press. ISBN 0-521-33028-9.
- Petersen, Andrew (2001). A Gazetteer of Buildings in Muslim Palestine (British Academy Monographs in Archaeology). Vol. I. Oxford University Press. pp. 161–175. ISBN 978-0-19-727011-0.
- Peilstöcker, Martin; Burke, Aaron A., eds. (2011). The History and Archaeology of Jaffa 1. Los Angeles: The Cotsen Institute of Archaeology Press. ISBN 978-1931745819.
- Šārôn Rôṭbard, Šārôn (2005). ʻÎr levānā, ʻîr šeḥôrā (English: White City, Black City) (in Hebrew). Tel Aviv: Babel. ISBN 978-965-512-096-7. OCLC 260080254.
- Segev, T. (1998). 1949, the First Israelis. New York: Henry Holt. ISBN 0-8050-5896-6.
- Thomson, W.M. (1859). The Land and the Book: Or, Biblical Illustrations Drawn from the Manners and Customs, the Scenes and Scenery, of the Holy Land. Vol. 2 (1 ed.). New York: Harper & brothers.
- Weill-Rochant, Catherine (2008). L'atlas de Tel Aviv : 1908–2008 (in French). Paris: CNRS Éditions. ISBN 978-2-271-06658-9.
- Yahav, Dan (2004). Yafo, kalat ha-yam : me-ʻir roshah li-shekhunot ʻoni, degem le-i-shiṿyon merḥavi (in Hebrew). Tel Aviv: Tamouz. OCLC 59707598.
- Yavin, Shmuel (2006). Bauhaus in Jaffa: Modern Architecture in an Ancient City. Tel Aviv: Bauhaus Center Tel Aviv. ISBN 965-90606-2-9.
