= Old Jaffa =

Historical part of Jaffa

Coordinates: 32°3′16.13″N 34°45′10.94″E

Old Jaffa يافا العتيقة יפו העתיקה
- Neighborhood of Tel Aviv
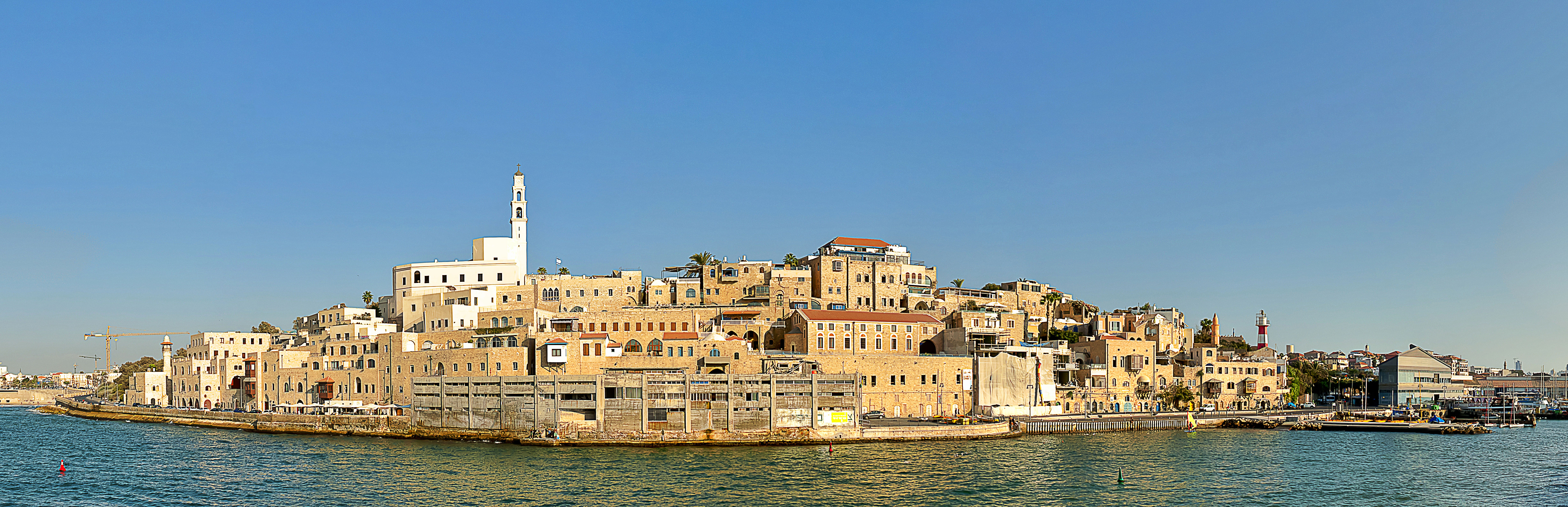
- Panoramic view of the neighborhood
- Interactive map of Old Jaffa
- Country: Israel
- City: Tel Aviv
- Established: Before 19th century

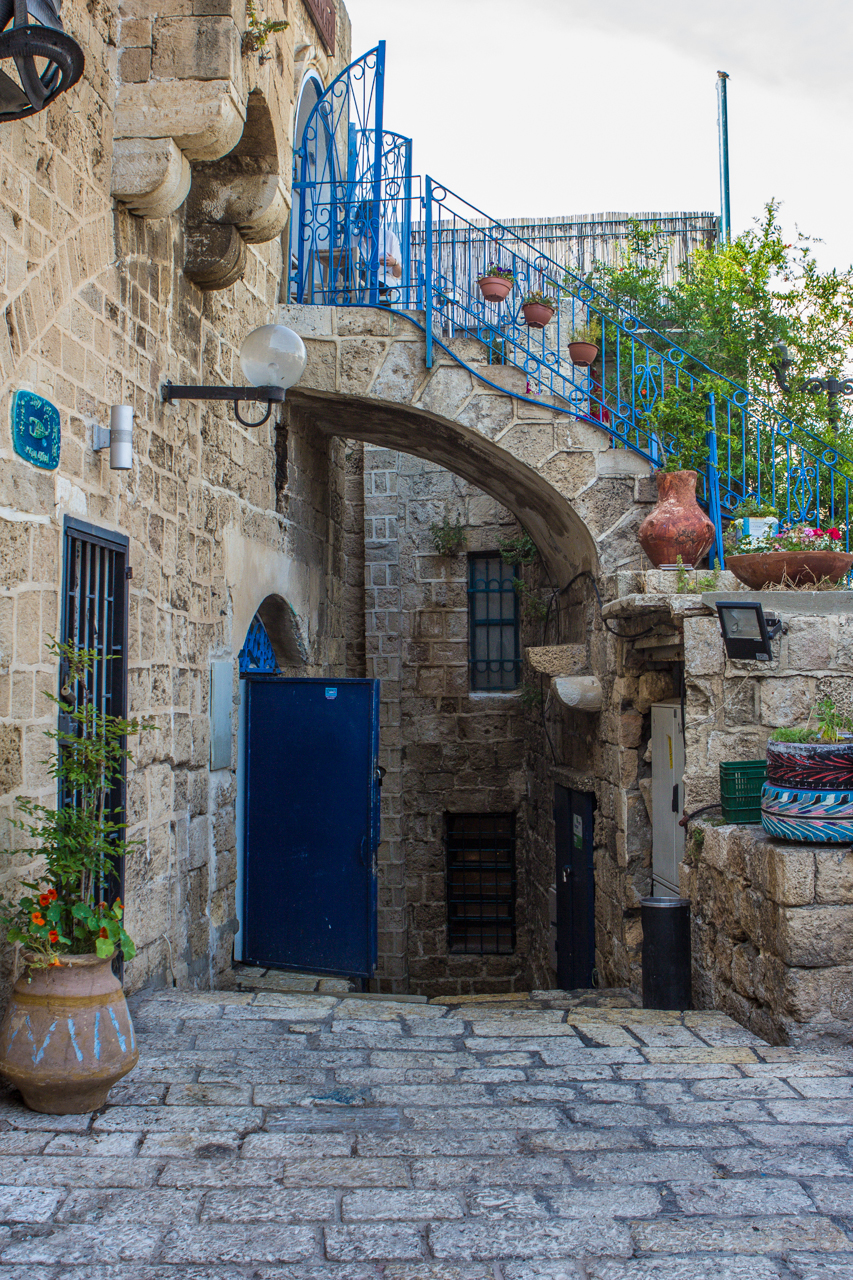
Old Jaffa alley

Old Jaffa (Arabic: يافا العتيقة, romanized: Yāfā al-‘Atīqah, lit. 'Ancient Jaffa', IPA: [jaː.faː al.ʕa.tiː.qa]; Hebrew: יפו העתיקה, romanized: Yafo HaAtikah), also known as the Old City of Jaffa, is the oldest neighborhood in Tel Aviv. It contains a range of tourist attractions, including mosques and churches, clock towers, art galleries, museums, restaurants and nightclubs.

Old Jaffa is located in the northwest of Jaffa, on a hill along the Mediterranean Sea. Geologically, the hill of Old Jaffa is the continental north end of a kurkar ridge, historically further protected through fortifications and heightened by debris.

== History ==
=== Ottoman Empire ===
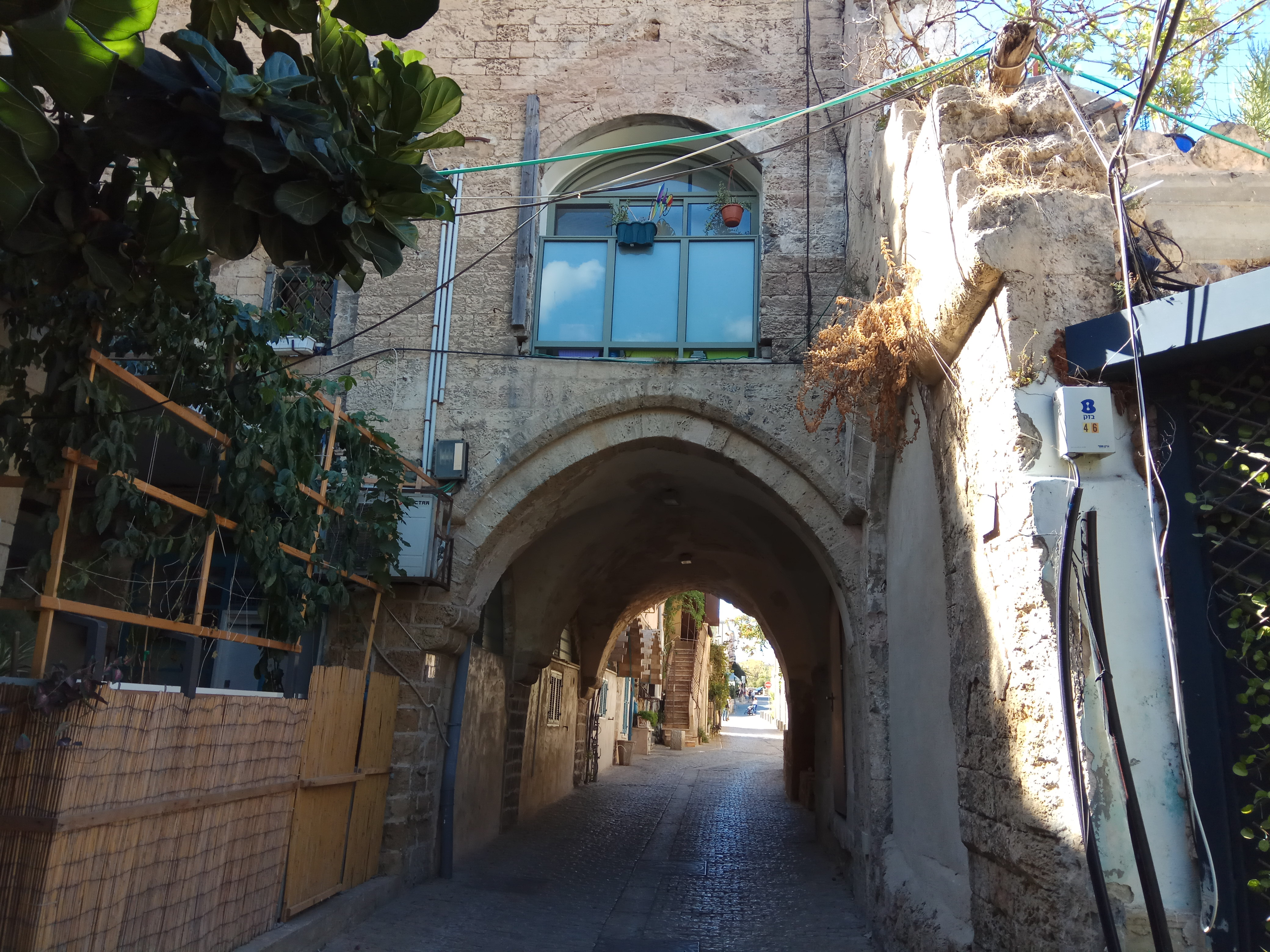
HaTsorfim Street in the neighbourhood.

The Old City was damaged by the Napoleonic Wars and an earthquake in 1837. When the wall of Jaffa, which was rebuilt in the early 19th century, was dismantled between 1878 and 1888 to allow expansion, both the city and the centres of government shifted eastwards, though the Old City remained the cultural center of the city.

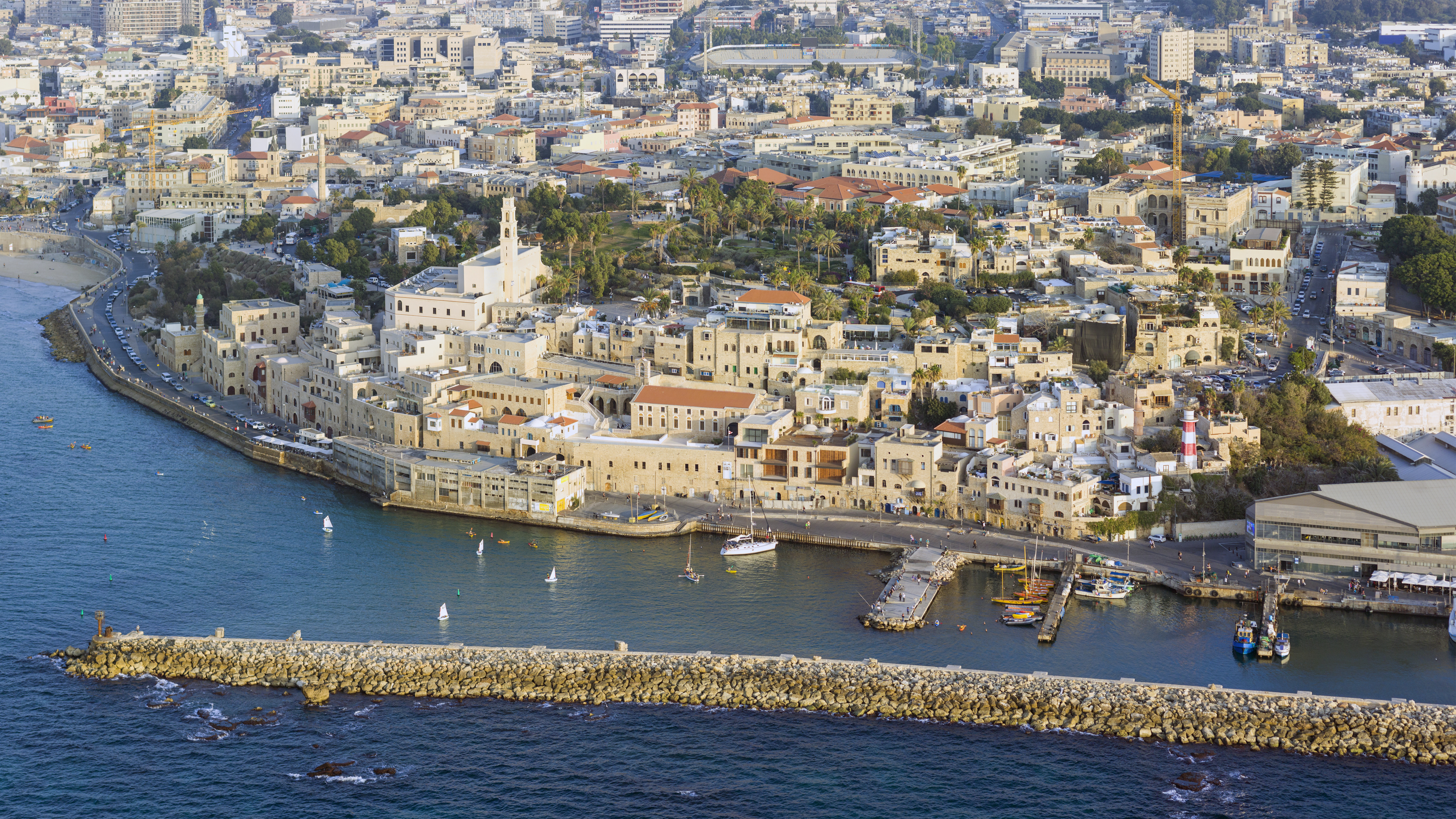
An aerial view of the Jaffa Port.

During the nineteenth century, the Christian population, especially the Greek Orthodox community, grew rapidly and dramatically in the Old Jaffa, and they formed the wealthy elite and the educated class in the city, and emerged as a major force in the increasingly middle-class trade of journalism.

=== Mandatory Palestine ===
During the 1936–1939 Arab revolt in Palestine, links between Tel Aviv and the Jaffa Port were partially severed by the unrest in the Old City. Palestinian fighters in Jaffa also used the Old City which contained a maze of homes, winding alleyways and an underground sewer system, to escape arrest by British security forces. Beginning in May 1936, in response to further Arab agitation in Jaffa, the British authorities suspended municipal services in the city, establishing barricades around the Old City and covering access roads with glass shards and nails. In June 15, the Royal Engineers used gelignite charges to demolish between 220 and 240 Palestinian Arab-owned homes in the Old City, leaving an open strip which cut through the center of Jaffa from end to end and displacing approximately 6,000 Palestinians.

The British authorities claimed that house demolitions in Jaffa were part of a "facelift" given to the Old City. Local Palestinian newspapers resorted to using sarcasm to describe the demolitions, writing that the British had "beautified" Jaffa using boxes of gelignite. Sir Michael McDonnell, then serving as the Chief Justice of the Supreme Court of Palestine, found in favor of Arab petitions from Jaffa and, upholding existing laws regarding house demolitions, ruled against the demolitions carried out by British forces in the Old City. In response, the Colonial Office dismissed him from his post. The revolt led to the British authorities to encourage the construction of the Tel Aviv Port on the Yarkon River estuary to the north of Tel Aviv to reduce reliance on the Jaffa Port.

=== Israel ===
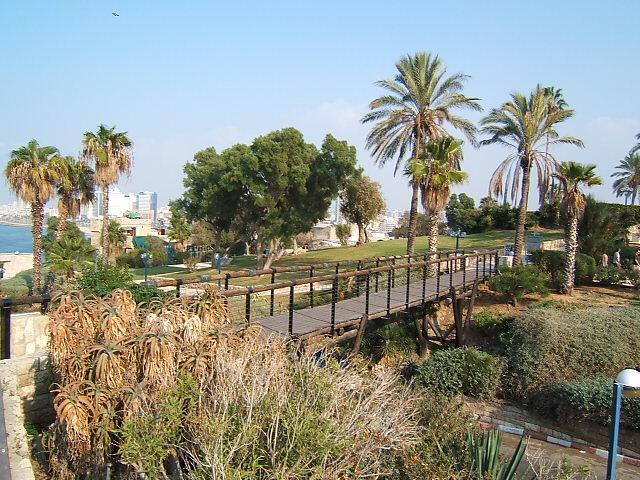
The park in the neighbourhood, with a view of the fotbridge.

Disputes about the merging of Tel Aviv and Jaffa, with the former wanting only to add the Jewish neighborhoods in the north of Jaffa and the latter wanting a total merge led to a gradual unification. The Old City was partly added on 18 May 1949 as part of the first Arab-controlled land to fall under Jewish control. The remainder of the Old City would be added on 24 April 1950 when the complete unification occurred.

Old Jaffa has increasingly gentrified with the residential population dropping dramatically and an increasing number of art galleries, restaurants, souvenir shops as well as various ongoing archaeological digs. According to Historian Menachem Klein, 7% of structures in old Jaffa have been destroyed between 1960 and 1985, with much of the old city being covered by Pisgah Park. There is a particular interest on the cultural melange by the relatively rare, in Israel, triple mix of Muslim, Jews, and Christian.

== Places in Jaffa ==
=== Pisgah Garden ===
The Pisgah garden, known also as the Abrasha garden was designed by Avraham Karavan. It is located on the top of Jaffa hill. The garden is connected to Kedumim Square and St. Peter's Church through the Zodiac Bridge over the road (Solomon's Bay Street) that borders the hill. The gardens integrate with their surroundings, so they can be reached from different directions. The area features several different activities and not just a park, there are archaeological excavation areas, restored homes, works of art and cannons from the Napoleonic Wars.

== Boundaries ==
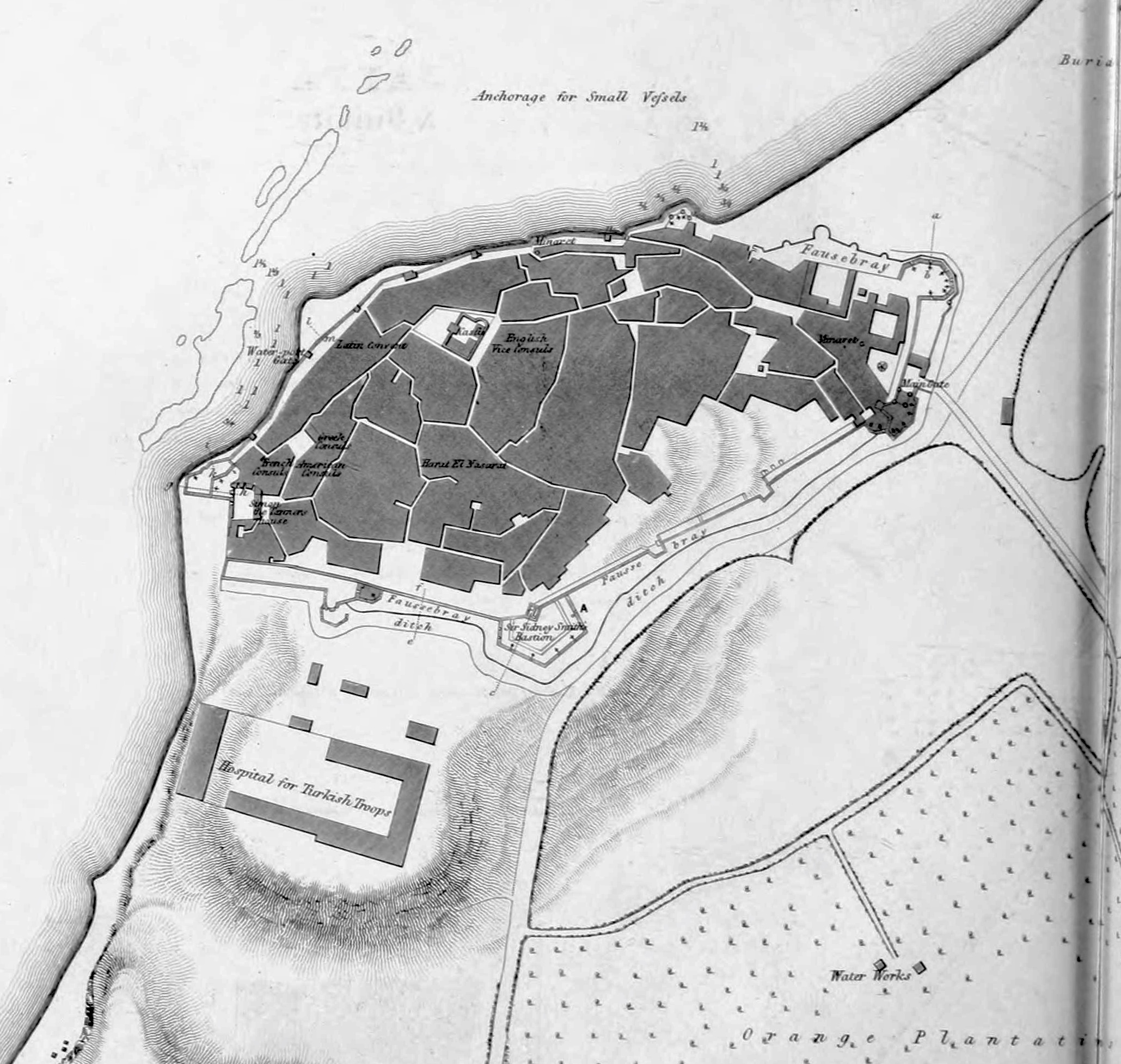
1840–42 Royal Engineers map of Jaffa

Current boundaries of the "Old Jaffa and Jaffa Port" neighborhood, as defined by the Municipality of Tel Aviv-Yafo (clockwise):

- North: north and east of Jaffa Beach, Retzif HaAliya HaShniya
- East: northbound lanes of David Raziel (putting the Jaffa Clock Tower in Old Jaffa), Yefet Street
- South: Yehuda HaYamit, Namal Yafo Street, the southern wall of the Jaffa Port parking lot
- West: the Mediterranean Sea shore

== Attractions ==
- Subregions: Jaffa Port in the west and Yefet Street on its eastern border
- Museums, galleries and studios: Farkash Gallery, Uri Geller Museum, Ilana Goor Museum, watchmaker Itay Noy
- Places of worship: Al-Bahr Mosque, Libyan Synagogue, Mahmoudiya Mosque, Saint Nicholas Monastery, St. Peter's Church
- Towers: Jaffa Clock Tower, Jaffa Light

Immediately outside Old Jaffa: Abouelafia Bakery, Abu Hassan Restaurant

== See also ==
- History of Tel Aviv
- Jaffa
- Old Jaffa Art Collection
