= Libyan Synagogue, Jaffa =

Synagogue in Jaffa

Coordinates: 32°3′12.1″N 34°45′4.43″E

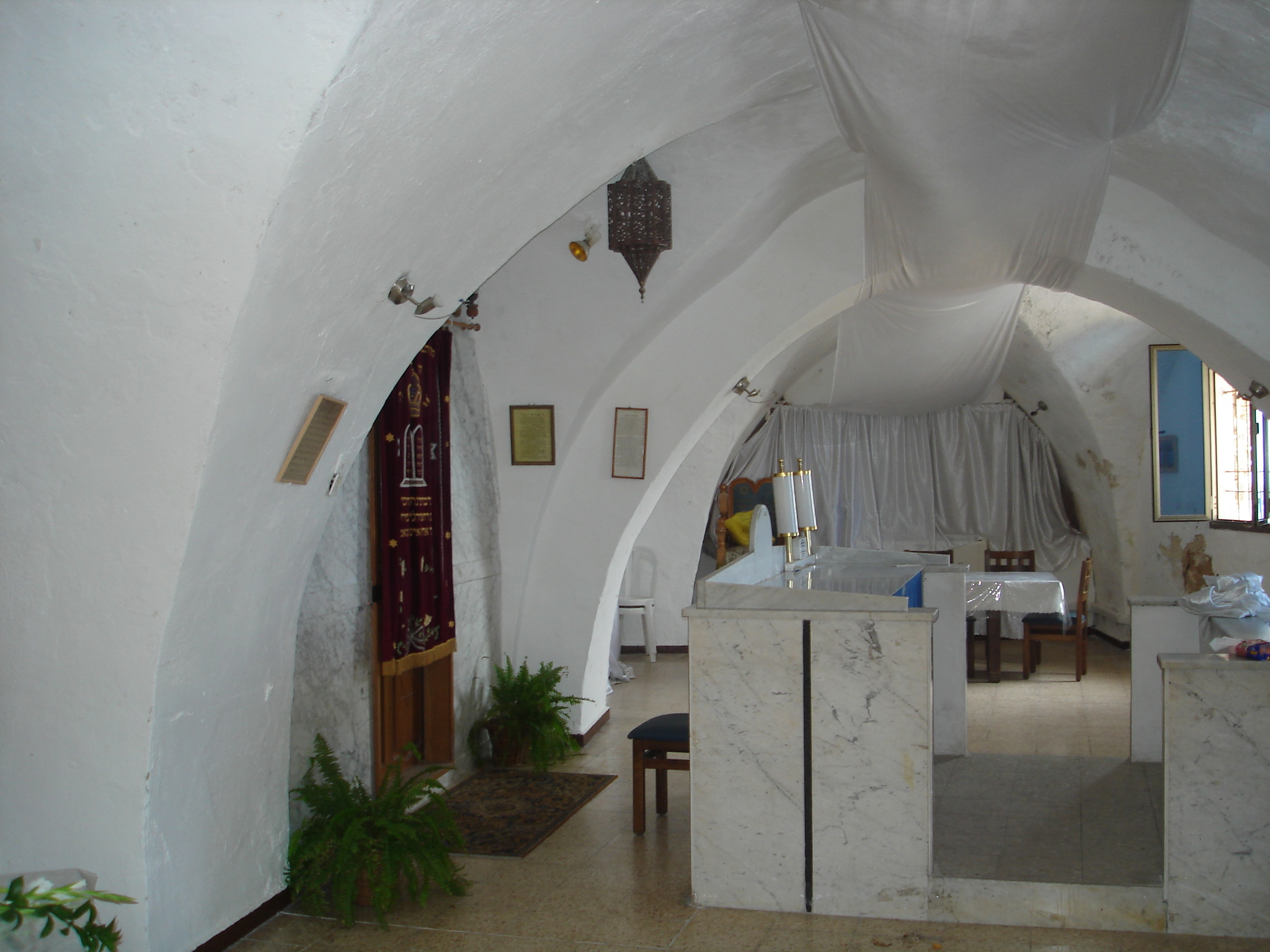
Interior of the synagogue

The Libyan synagogue of Jaffa (Hebrew: בית הכנסת לעולי לוב Beit haknesset le'olei Louv) is a Mizrahi Jewish synagogue built inside a former hotel in 1948 by Jewish immigrants from Libya. Located on Rehov Mazal Daggim, the Pisces (Fish) Street, in the historical part of Jaffa, it is the oldest synagogue in Tel Aviv-Yafo.

== History ==
=== 18th–19th century hostel ===
The building was originally built as a khan (a roadside hostel) in 1740 near the Port of Jaffa by Ottoman authorities in Constantinople. It was the only Jewish khan in the city, available for Jewish pilgrims going to Jerusalem and other holy cities in the area. In addition to reception rooms for pilgrims, the khan also had a synagogue and a mikvah (Jewish ritual bath). The building was also known by the name Zonana House, named after Rabbi Yaakov ben David Zonana, who owned it.

Rabbi Chaim Joseph David Azoulay stayed at the khan in 1757 and described the place in his memoirs as a place of "silence and tranquility". This tranquility is all relative, as sever years later another pilgrim, Rabbi Simcha Mazalevitz, wrote that the Arabs confiscated the building for the first time. At first, the Arabs allowed Jewish pilgrims, whose number had diminished, to come to the site three days a year, and later made the site completely forbidden to Jews.

Over the years the building was used for a variety of different purposes, eventually becoming a soap factory, though the Arab population continued to refer to the building as the Jewish House.

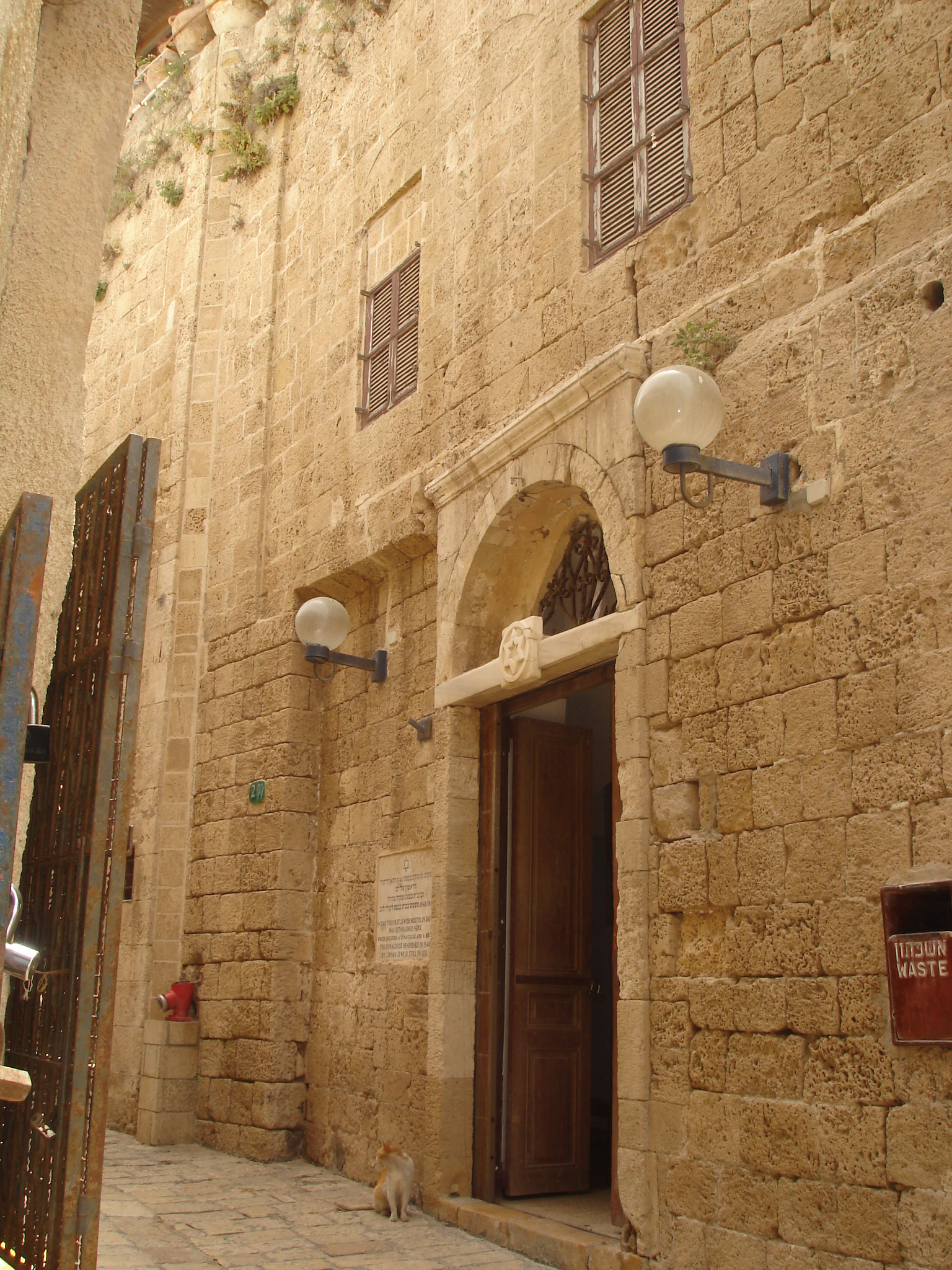
The entrance to the building at Rehov Mazal Dagim

=== Re-establishment as a synagogue ===
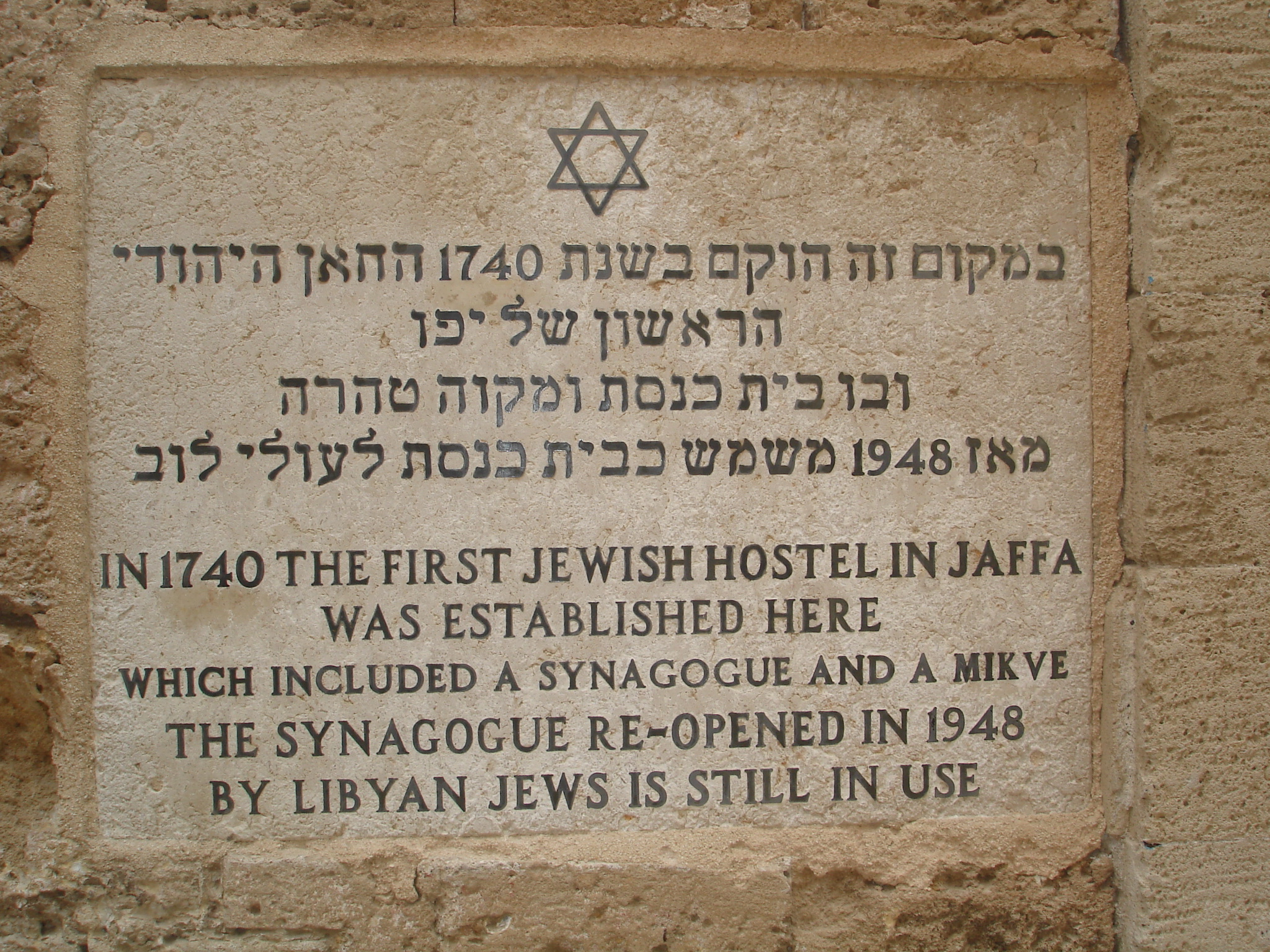
Plaque at the entrance of the synagogue

The site became property of Jews after the 1947–1949 Palestine war. At the end of 1948, the synagogue became a cultural center for Jewish immigrants, primarily from Libya, who had settled in the neighborhood. According to legend, the Libyan Jewish community was looking for a building to serve as a synagogue, when they ran into a Franciscan priest from St. Peter's Church in Jaffa, who gave them the keys to the building and told them that the building used to be a synagogue.

It wasn't until the 1980s that historians made the connection between the synagogue and the former Ottoman khan, due to the lack of direct proof. The researchers had always assumed that the khan had been destroyed between the end of 18th century and the beginning of the 19th century during the Arab revolts.

The Libyan Jews began to leave the Old City of Jaffa, moving to more modern neighborhoods. The Old City eventually was emptied of most of its residents and became an artistic and tourist destination. Despite the changes to the neighborhood, the synagogue continued to conduct shabbat and holiday services, but found it difficult to form a minyan, to the point that congregants, often older people, would appeal to tourists to form a minyan. Today the Old City location is not used for Shabbat services and the congregation has a new location in Yafo D. However, descendents of Libyan immigrants, even those living outside the city, continue to come to the site to celebrate their Bar Mitzvah or their wedding.

=== Ilana Goor Museum ===
In 1995, the east wing of the building was transformed into the Ilana Goor Museum.

== Description ==
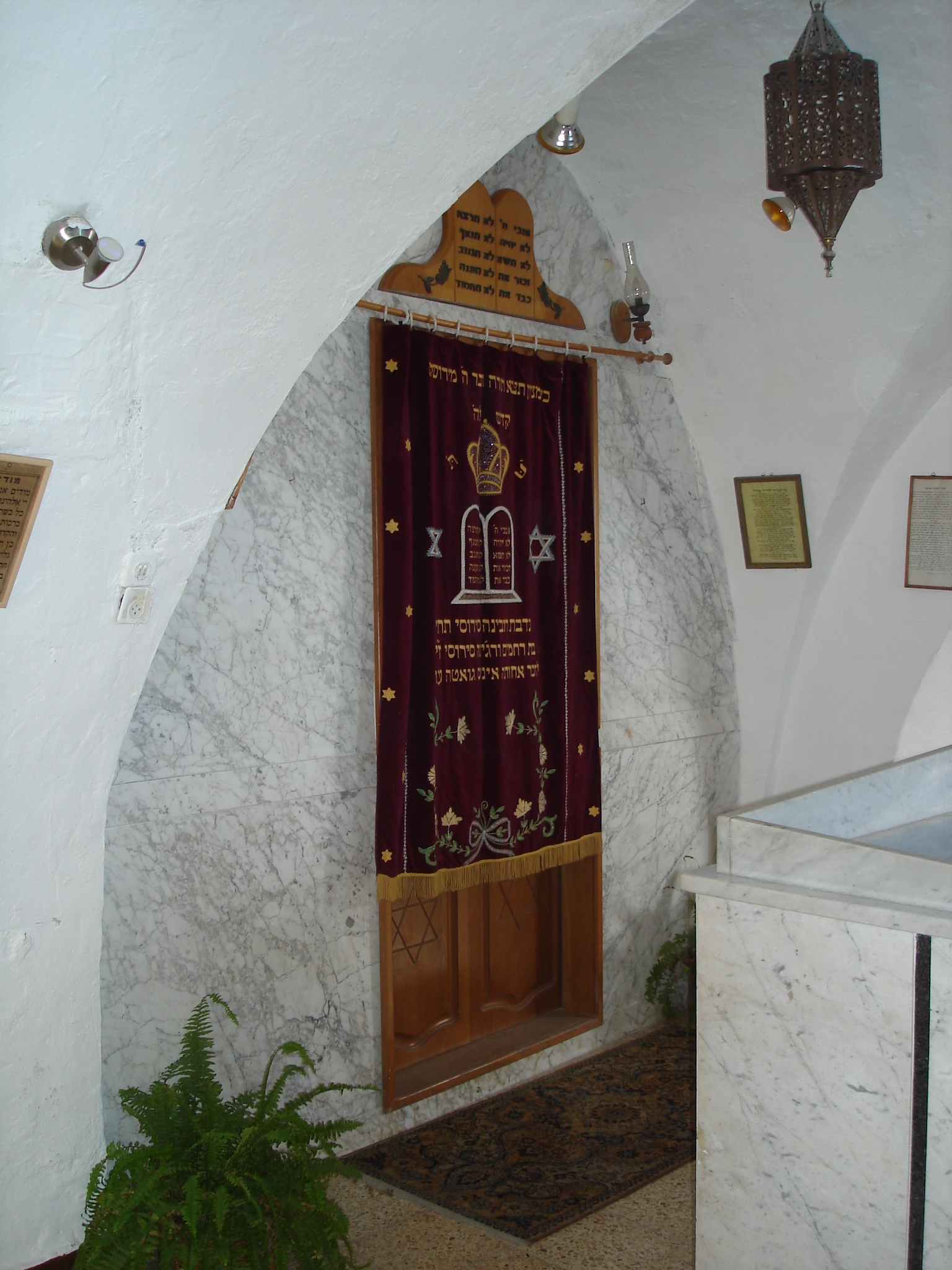
The Ark

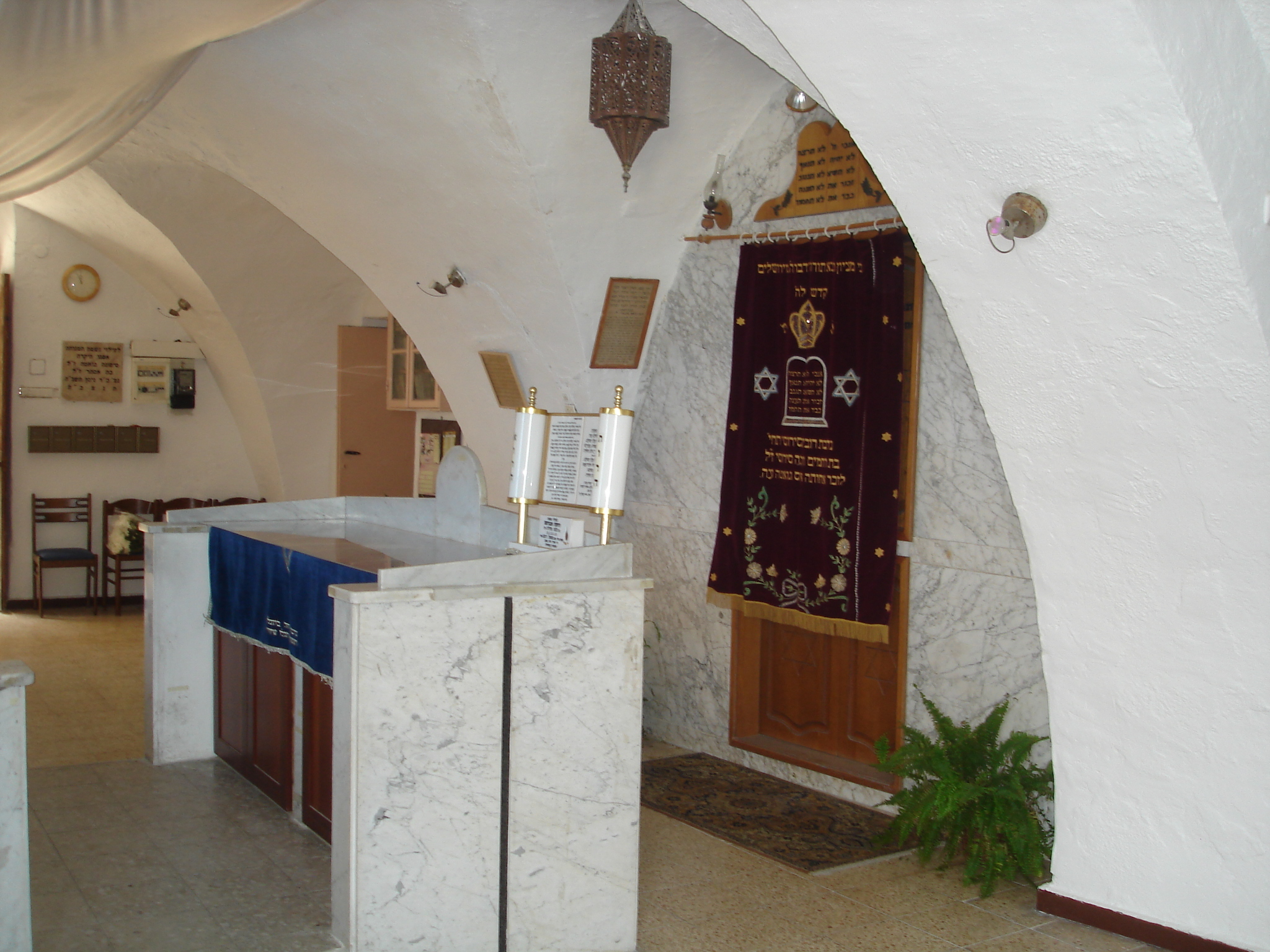
The Bimah

The synagogue is found within the tourist areas of the Old City of Jaffa, along ancient limestone paved streets. Nothing distinguishes the exterior of the synagogue from other buildings except the Star of David above the lintel of the door and an engraved stone on the wall to the left of the door indicating in Hebrew and English the origins of the building:

In 1740 the first Jewish hostel in Jaffa was established here which included a synagogue and a mikveh. The synagogue reopened in 1948 by Libyan Jews is still in use.

One enters the synagogue through a wooden door. The sanctuary is small, with low vaulted ceilings. The sanctuary is divided into three parts with the Ark carved into the wall in the center of the room. The bimah is situated perpendicular to the Ark and occupies a large part of the center of the room. The back of the room is the only place with a window and has a table and chairs to facilitate study. The walls are painted white.
