= Sam Halaby =

Druze artist (born 1989)

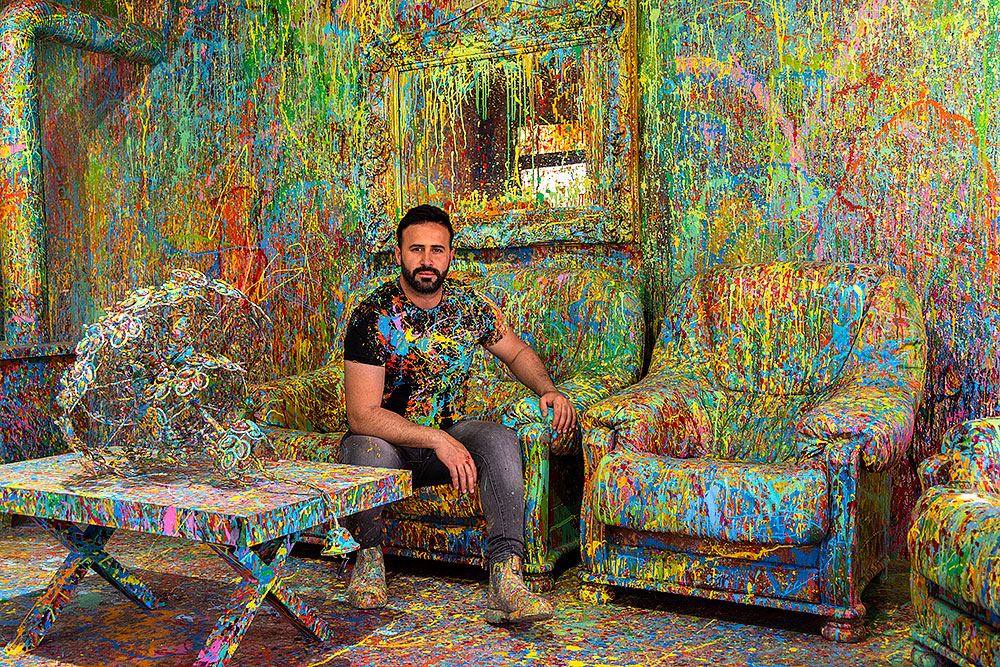
Sam Halaby in "The House of Colors"

Sam Halaby (born 1989, also known as "The Color Hunter", סאם חלבי) is a Druze artist, known for his paint-splash style and for works that transform realistic elements into art exhibited both in Israel and abroad.

== Biography ==
Halaby was born and raised in Daliyat al-Karmel, the youngest child after nine sisters in a traditional Druze family. He has noted that his creative artistic qualities was deeply influenced by his mother.

His style is influenced by Druze culture and life in Israel.

== Artistic career ==
Halaby has exhibited his work in various venues in Israel and internationally, including shows in Europe and the United States.

In 2022, he presented The Color Hunter, a solo exhibition in Tel Aviv (curator: Doron Polak; producers: Ran Lavdy, Tali Ben Sira, and Iris Elhanani). The exhibition, which extended across 1,000 square meters, was based on his signature artistic style. It drew more than 25,000 visitors over the course of a single week and received enthusiastic reviews from multiple audiences.

In April 2023, Halaby opened Beit HaTzeva'im ("The House of Colors"), the childhood home where he grew up with his family in Daliyat al-Karmel. The project turned the building into an art museum and visitor center open to the public throughout the week. Halaby painted all of the building's walls (approximately 600 meters across four floors) in hundreds of colors, transforming it into an environmental architectural sculpture, the first of its kind in Israel. The project was carried out with the support of the Israeli paint company Nirlat, which contributed around 1,800 liters of paint for the installation.

Halaby described the project as a house where he had experienced joy, hardship, challenges, and loss-particularly after the death of his mother. He explained that he decided to "paint the past" and preserve memory, without regard to real estate value or material considerations, while presenting the story of his life.

As of April 2025, approximately one million people had visited the project. In addition, Halaby was reported as the Israeli artist with the highest number of social media views, with more than 90 million views worldwide on Instagram alone.

== Notable projects ==
Halaby has collaborated with international brands in various fields. Notable projects include:

- Monday.com - Halaby's works were exhibited at the United Nations building in New York as part of Creating Hope, a project combining art with messages of hope and community connection.
- Hostages' Square, Tel Aviv (with Nirlat) - Following the events of October 7 and the hostage crisis, Halaby, in collaboration with Nirlat, created the installation Now! addressing the relationship between art and social awareness through unique colors and lighting. The work was developed together with the families of hostages. Another installation, Freedom, consisted of 120 yellow doves cast in iron and set in concrete, symbolizing the call for liberty. Both projects were intended to raise awareness of the issue.
- Düsseldorf, Germany - Halaby redesigned the city's symbol, the Radschläger (cartwheel figure representing local joy and tradition), as a contribution to the local community.
- Mercedes-Benz collaboration - Halaby presented an electric Mercedes car in a modern-art style, highlighting the connection between technology and art, as part of a pop-up exhibition at Ramat Aviv Mall.
- Spirit of Summer, Yvel Center, Motza, Jerusalem An exhibition held from June 4 to 29, 2023, at the Yvel Center in Jerusalem, in partnership with Yvel Jewelry. Halaby presented a series of paint-splatter works alongside fine jewelry displays.
- Art To Go Tel Aviv, Amiad Center, Jaffa. Displayed from April 7 to 15, 2023, at the Amiad Center in Jaffa and organized in collaboration with the Zaritsky Painter and Sculptor Association. Halaby showcased his piece "Tree of Life".
- Great Light, Jaffa Port. A group exhibition curated by Tali Ben Sira, held from December 7 to 23, 2023, at Warehouse 2 in Jaffa Port. The exhibition focused on the events of October 7, with all proceeds directed toward the rehabilitation of communities near the Gaza border. Halaby presented the work "Bloom".
- Bridge of Hope, held in July 2025 to mark 60 years of diplomatic relations between Israel and Germany. The exhibition was initiated by Ambassador Ron Prosor and centered on themes of unity and peace.
- Pouring Hope from July 6 to 31, 2025, in collaboration with the Melisron Group. The installation featured a six-meter-high structure of buckets pouring colorful building blocks into a transparent frame, along with a car decorated with thousands of 3D elements.
- The Druze and Us – A Brotherhood Pact. A solidarity and art event held on July 31, 2025, in Tel Aviv's Habima Square and Majdal Shams, with participation from artists of diverse communities. Halaby presented a work dedicated to unity and shared identity. The initiative was led by Doron Polak, Oded Hubara, and others, with support from the Civilian Emergency HQ and Nirlat.
- Sam Halaby- The Color Hunter- exhibition- Art Miami Context 2 to 7 December 2025
