= Farkash Gallery =

Art gallery in Jaffa, Tel Aviv, Israel

Coordinates: 32°3′11.78″N 34°45′4.6″E

The Farkash Gallery (Hebrew: גלריית פרקש) is an art gallery in Jaffa, Tel Aviv, Israel.

== History ==
Farkash Gallery houses the largest collection in the world of vintage historical Israeli posters. The collection contains posters from Palestine as well as modern-day Israel. The collection was founded in 1948 by the Farkash family and is located in Old Jaffa. Today the Farkash Gallery is run by Aharon Farkash.

The collection includes military posters, political posters, advertisements and movie promotions.

== Published works ==
- REVOLUTION OR TERROR? VINTAGE POSTERS AND ARTICLES BY LEADING ACADEMY AND PUBLIC FIGURES. Farkash Gallery Publish 2002.
- COLLECTION OF VINATGE POSTERS OF MAY 1ST IN ISRAEL (HEBREW). Farkash Gallery Publish 2003.
- VINTAGE PHOTOS BOOK OF YOM KIPPUR WAR BATTLES IN SINAI (HEBREW). Uri Dan And Farkash Gallery 2003.
- THE ROAD TO ISRAEL’S INDEPENDENCE, COLLECTION OF ISRAELI MEMORABILIA ITEMS (HEBREW). Haatzmaut Road Publish 2008
- HISTORICAL PHOTOGRAPHS ALBUM OF ISRAEL’S OLD CITY OF JAFFA. Farkash Gallery Publish 2015.
- TEL AVIV, ONCE UPON A TIME, HISTORICAL PHOTOGRAPHS ALBUM OF THE FIRST HEBREW CITY. Farkash Gallery Publish 2015.
- HAIM BSERET The album of Israeli cinema 1913 To 2014. Farkash Gallery Publish 2016

== See also ==
- Visual arts in Israel
