= Abu Hassan (restaurant) =

Hummus restaurant in Israel

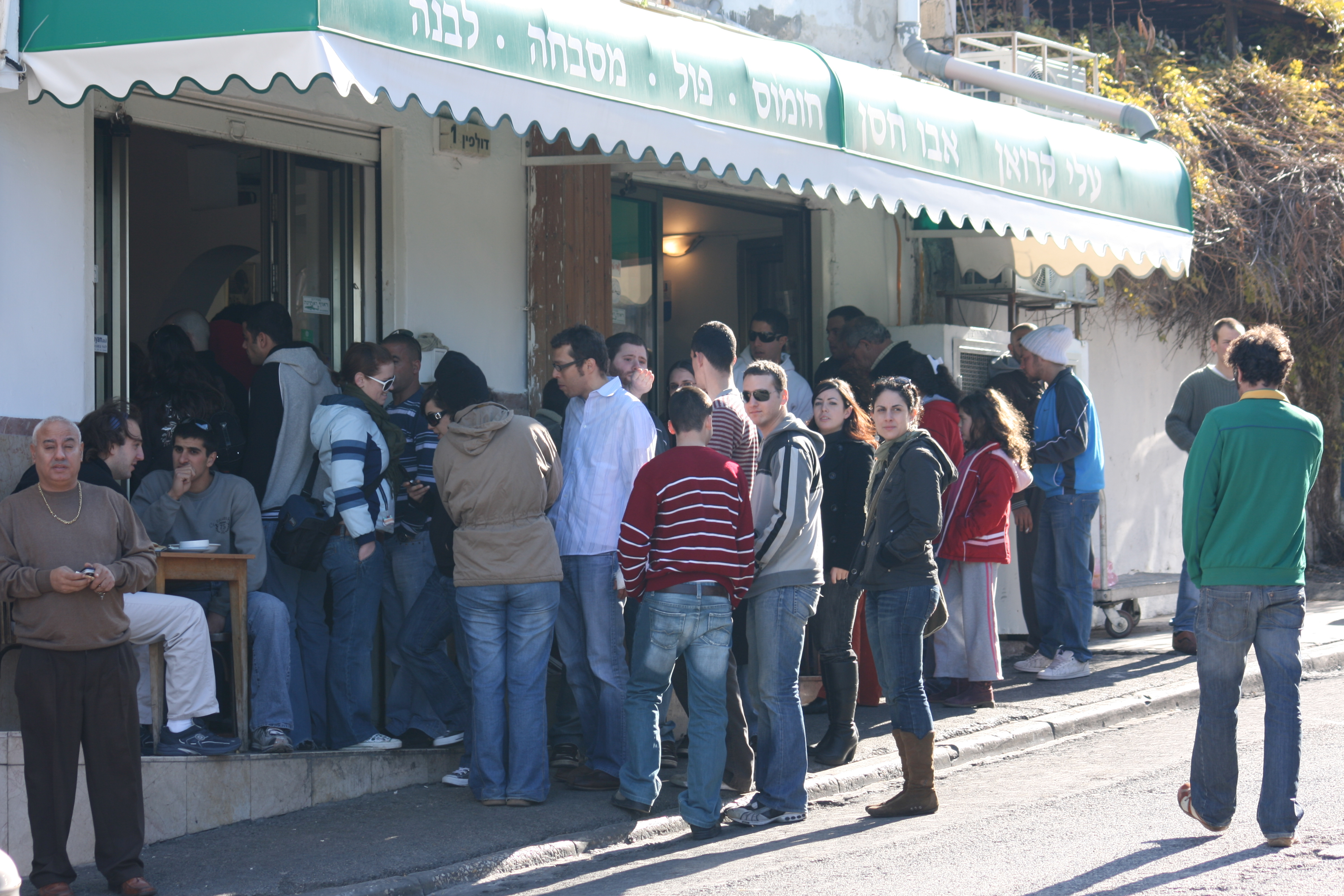
- Customers lined up in front of Abu Hassan on HaDolfin Street
- Founded: 1970s
- Headquarters: Jaffa, Tel Aviv, Israel
- Number of locations: 3
- Key people: Ali Karawan (until 2007); Ibrahim Karawan
- Products: Hummus

Ali Karawan – Abu Hassan (Hebrew: עלי קרוואן – אבו חסן, Arabic: علي كروان – أبو حسن) is one of the oldest and most famous hummus restaurants in Israel. Its original branch is on HaDolphin Street in Jaffa, Tel Aviv and there are two more branches located on Shivtei Israel Street. It has been rated as the best hummus restaurant in Israel in many lists. The restaurant is famous for its loyal clientele of Arabs and Jews, laborers and tourists, sitting side by side and crammed to the same tables, and the long line that waits at its entrance every day at noon. The hummus restaurant was founded by Ali Karawan, known as Abu Hassan.

== History ==
Karawan began by selling hummus from a cart in the Ajami neighborhood of Jaffa. In 1959 he opened his first restaurant on 60th Street, now Yefet Street, a business that did not last long. In the early 1970s, he opened a restaurant on Dolphin Street, at the corner of Yehuda HaYamit. This restaurant is still active today.

After decades of refusal to open additional branches, a larger hummus restaurant was opened on Shivtei Yisrael Street, not far from the original restaurant. The success of this branch, which despite its larger size is also characterized by a long line of diners at the entrance, led to the opening of a third restaurant, Pearl of Jaffa - Brothers Karawan that also sells fries, falafel, and salad. In October 2007 Karawan died after years of minor involvement in the management of the network during which his son Ibrahim served as the director. In December 2022, Hassan, the eldest son of Karawan, died.

== Concept ==
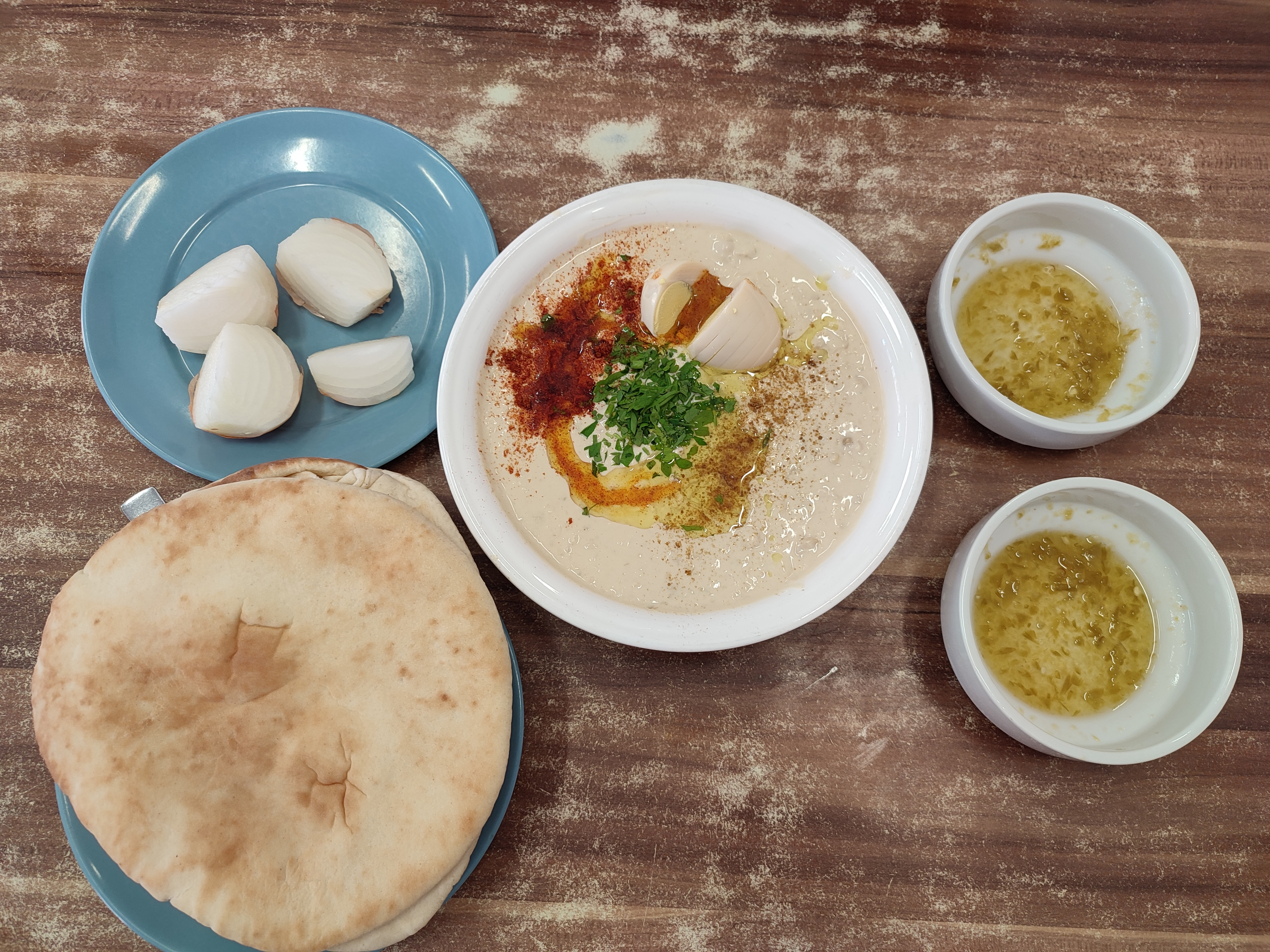
Hummus served by Abu Hassan, with egg, pitas and onions

Abu Hassan's original restaurant on Dolphin Street is small, overcrowded and almost uncluttered. It is open from eight in the morning and closes when there is no more food, usually in the early afternoon. Due to the long line that is steeped in the entrance, hummus is eaten sitting together with other diners around the same table, as is customary in many working restaurants. Restaurant service is fast, efficient and sometimes even aggressive. The reservation and serving are very quick, and the waiters often urge the diners who have finished eating to make room for those waiting in line.

The restaurant's menu is very limited. The restaurant serves only four basic courses - hummus, masabacha, brown beans (ful medames) and labane - and dishes that combine them. The signature dish of the restaurant is the triangle (in Arabic: Mutha'alat, in Hebrew: Meshulash), a triangular dish that includes hummus, ful and masabacha. With the dishes, pitas, fresh onions, and saucers of hot sauce with lemon salt are served.

The restaurant does not offer the guests a written menu for viewing around the table, but presents the various dishes and their prices on the wall of the restaurant.

== Reception ==
- Eater: "must-try delight"
- Lonely Planet: "If hummus is a religion, then this could be its Mecca."
