= Itay Noy =

Israeli watchmaker, designer and artist

Itay Noy איתי נוי
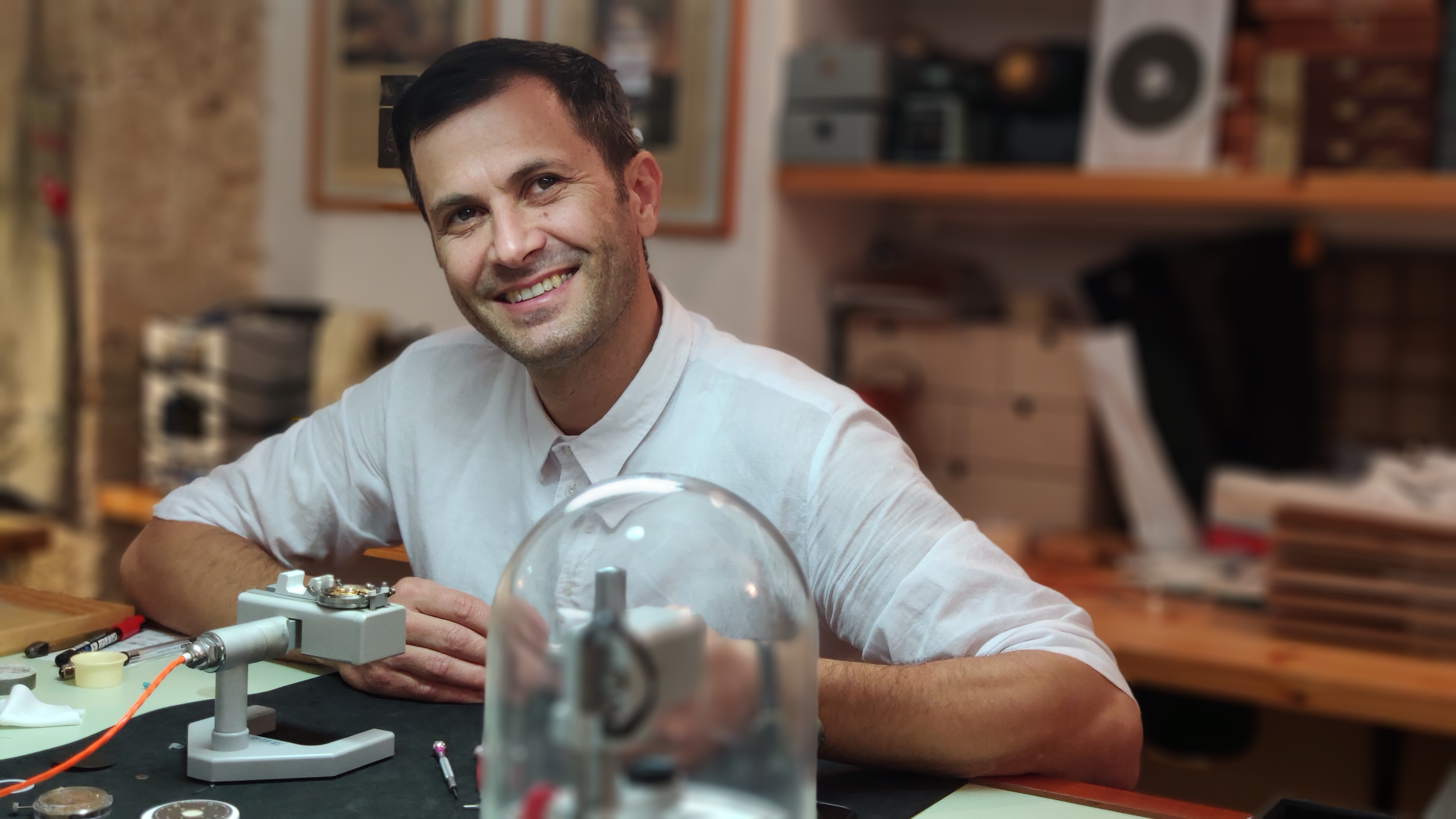
- Itay Noy
- Known for: Master watchmaker
- Website: www.itay-noy.com

Itay Noy (Hebrew: איתי נוי) is an Israeli watchmaker, designer, and artist who creates limited-edition timepieces in his independent studio in the Old Jaffa.

== Education ==
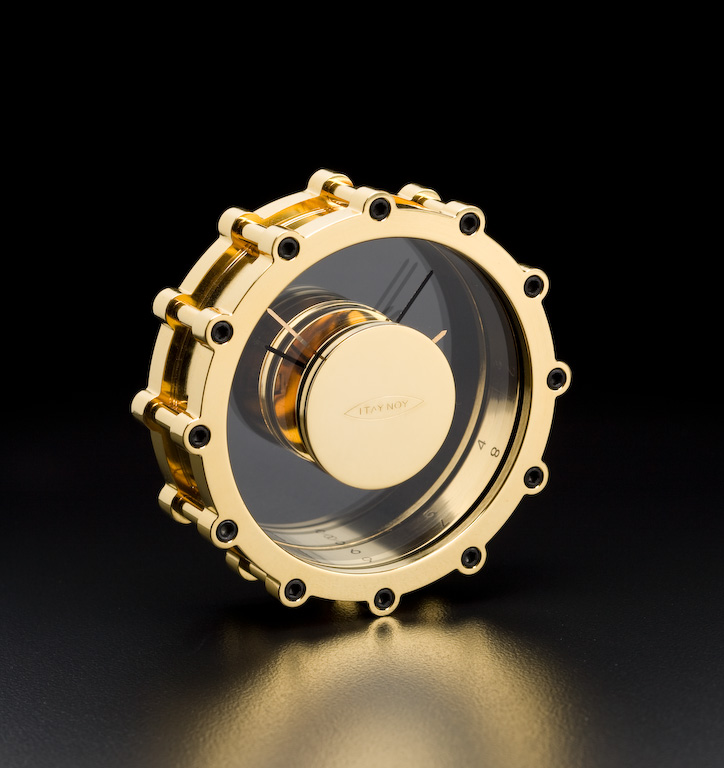
"Tablec" model

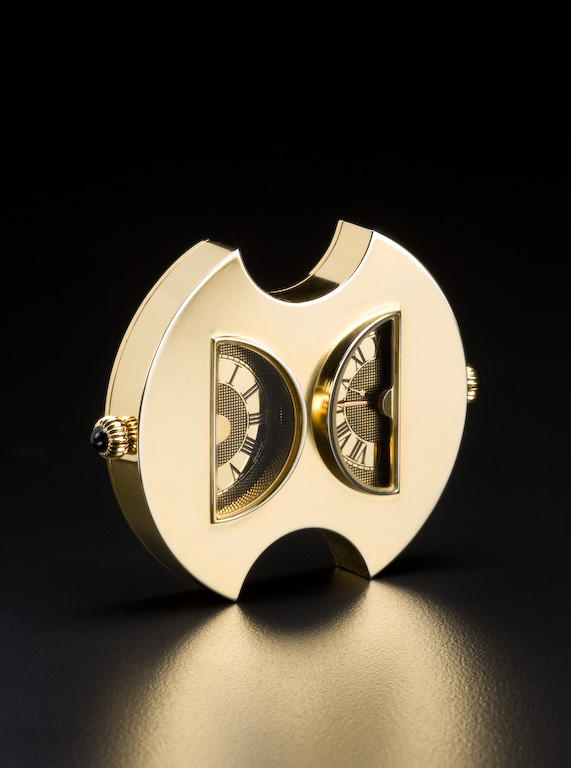
Table clock

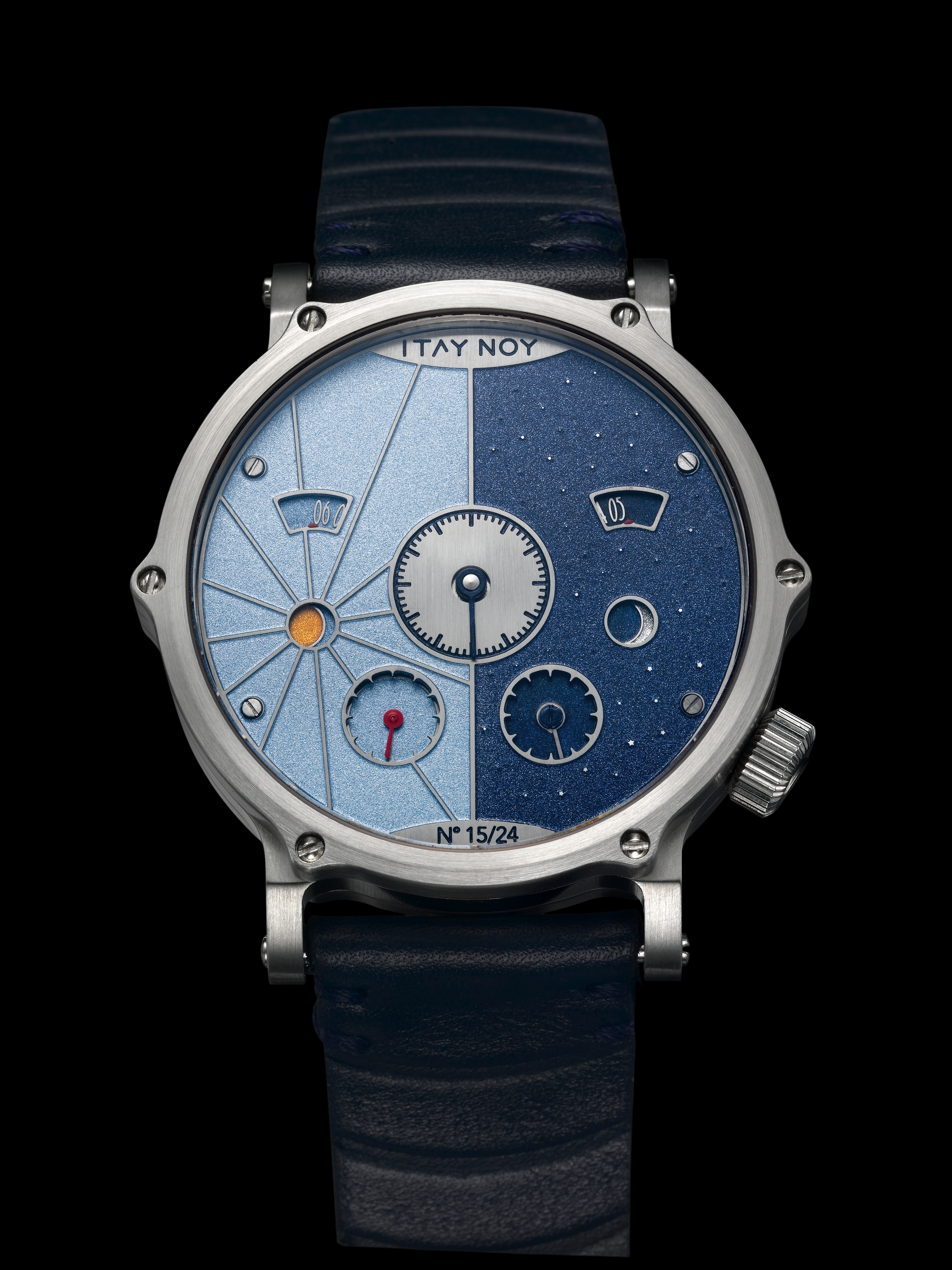
"Part time blue" model

1996-2000 B.F.A. Jewelry and Object Design, Bezalel Academy of Art and Design, Jerusalem

1998 Student exchange program, Gerrit Rietveld Academy, Amsterdam, Netherlands

2002 Industrial Design, Interior and Identity Design, Design Academy Eindhoven, Netherlands

M.Des. from the Eindhoven University of Technology

== Professional experience ==
Since 1999 independent artist and designer

Since 2000 Designer of timepieces and Jewelry for international companies

Since 2005 Lecturer at the Jewelry & Fashion department, Bezalel Academy of Art and Design, Jerusalem

2007 Summer course at Penland School of Craft, North Carolina, USA

2016 Member at the Judges committee for The Design Prize, Ministry of Cultural of Israel

== Awards ==
- 1999 America-Israel Cultural Foundation, Scholarship for the years 1999, 2000
- 1999 Second prize, competition for design of the statue of the Eurovision contest in Jerusalem
- 2000 Lockman Prize for practical Design, Bezalel
- 2000 First prize, Academies category, Biennale Internationale Design, Saint-ֹtienne, France
- 2001 America-Israel Cultural Foundation, Scholarship for the years 2001, 2002 with distinction
- 2003 America-Israel Cultural Foundation, Scholarship for Excellency - M.A studies abroad
- 2005 Outstanding Artist Award, Absorption Ministry
- 2007 The Andy Prize for the Arts
- 2011 The Design Prize 2011, Ministry of Cultural of Israel
- The Israeli Ministry of Culture and Sport's Prize for Design

== Collections ==
- Private collection of Mr. Charles Bronfman, NY
- Droog Design collection, Amsterdam, Netherlands
- Museum of the Dutch Clock, Zaandam, Netherlands
- Private collection of Mr. Stef Wertheimer, Tefen Industrial Park, Israel
- The Israel Museum, Jerusalem
- Tel Aviv Museum of Art, Tel Aviv, Israel
- Design Museum Holon, Israel
- Museum for Islamic Art, Jerusalem

== Shows ==
US: Museum of Art & Design, N.Y | Design week N.Y | SOFA New York | Wind Up N.Y | SOFA Chicago | Wind Up San Francisco I YAW Gallery, Michigan | Cotter Gallery, Colorado | China: Gallery bund, Shanghai | Contemporary art terminal, Shenzhen | Netherlands: Modern Kunst Museum, Arnhem | Textile Museum, Tilburg | Droog Design Gallery, Amsterdam | Groningen Museum, Groningen | Israel: Ariela’s Hause, Tel Aviv | Horace Richter Gallery, Old Jaffa | Museum for Israeli Art, Ramat Gan | Art Gallery of Tel Aviv University | Israel: Tikotin Museum, Haifa | Eretz Israel Museum, Tel Aviv | Tal Gallery, Kfar Vradim I Design Museum Holon I Australia: Sydney opera house, Sydney | Melbourne Museum, Melbourne | Biennale Internationale Design 2000, Saint-Etienne, France | pp gallery Taipei, Taiwan | Grand Hornu, Belgium | Basel World, Switzerland

== From the press ==
The Style section of the Wall Street Journal described Noy's Part Time Sun and Moon watch as "an exercise in experimentation. The enigmatic dial features five windows: a central one showing minutes, surrounded by four additional apertures indicating seconds, hours, day (with a sun) and night (with a moon)." Noy argues that complex design enhances the wearer's engagement with his watch.
