= Yefet Street =

Coordinates: 32°3′4.83″N 34°45′10.53″E

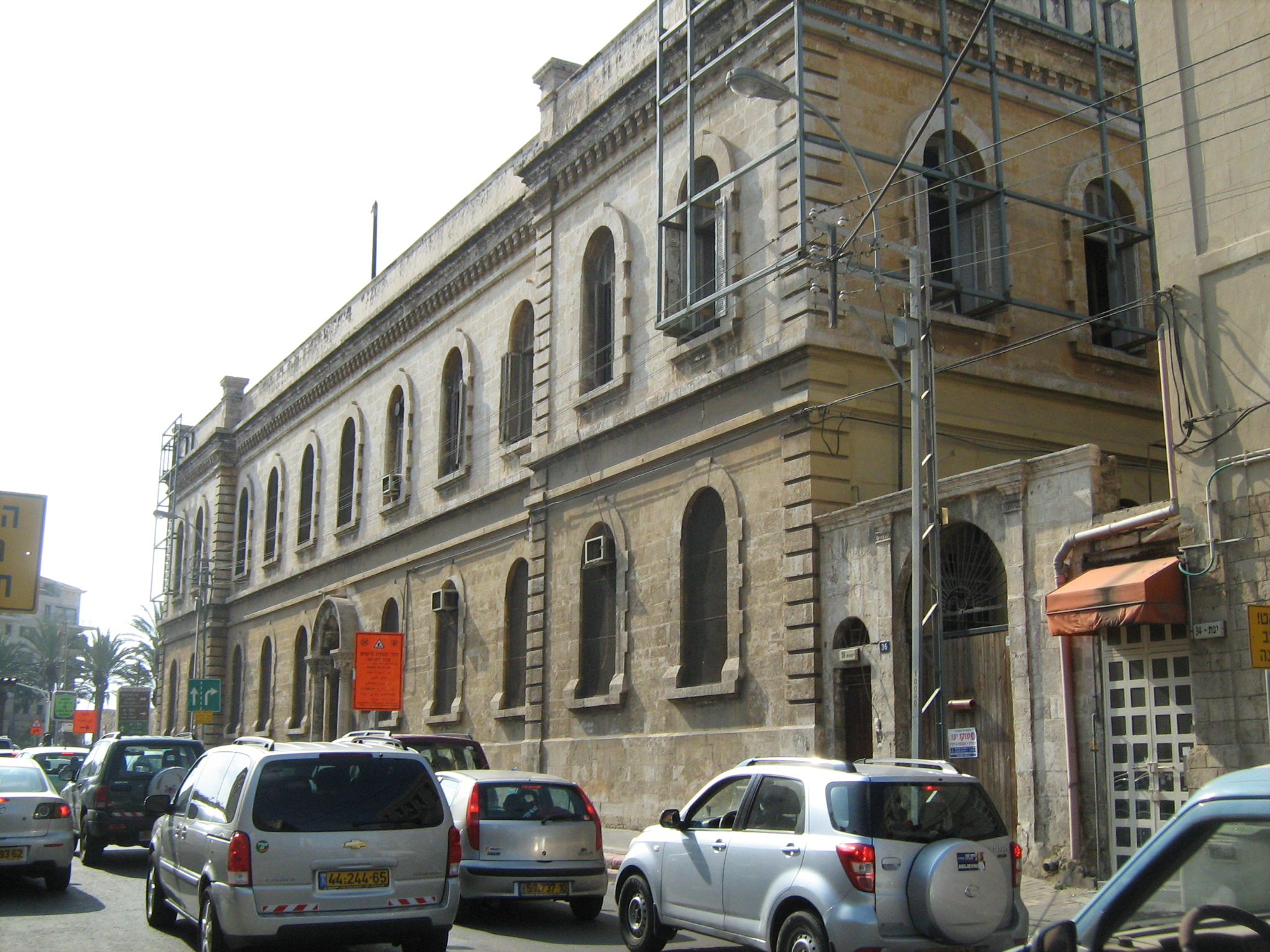
The French Hospital in Old Jaffa

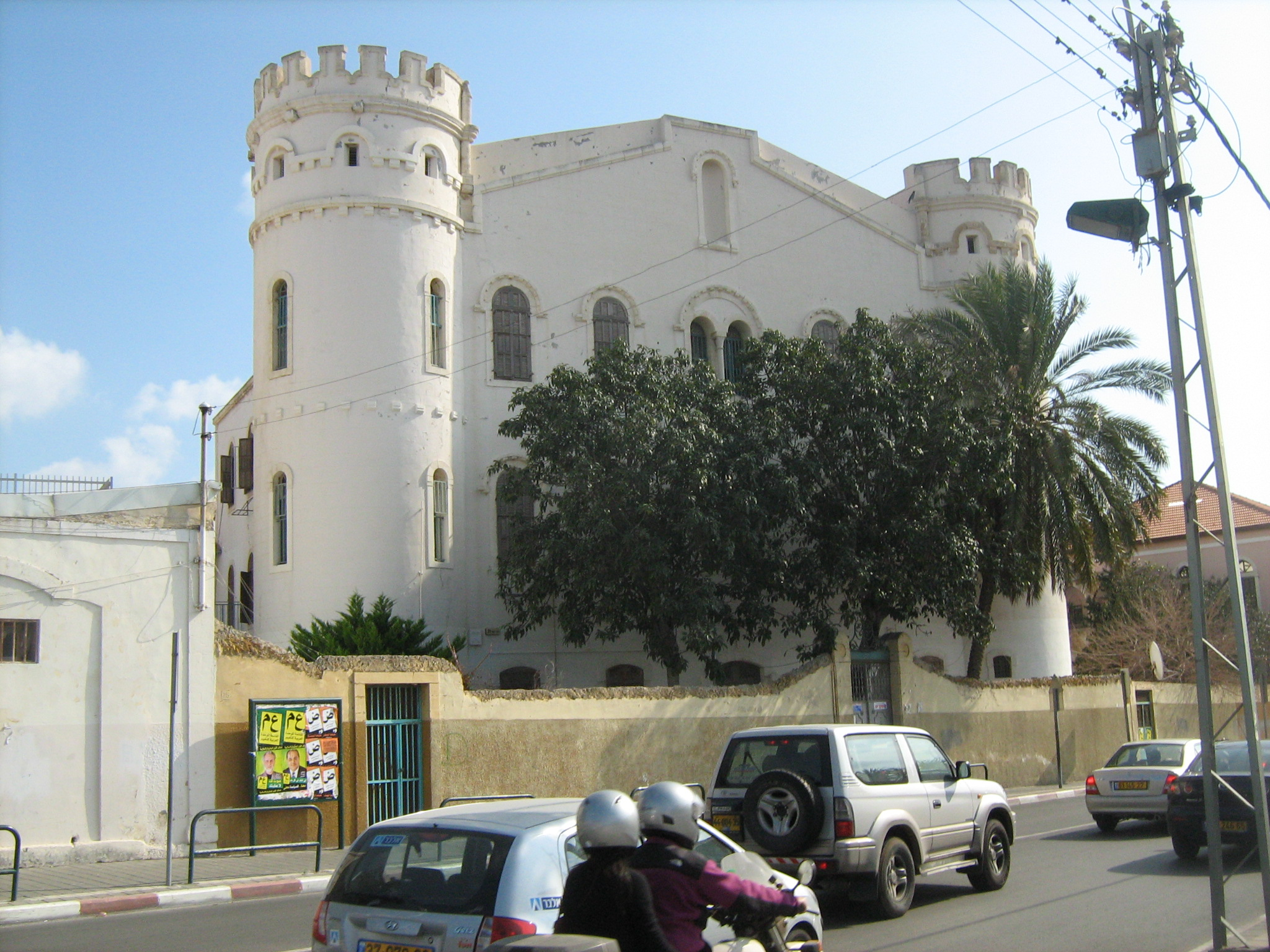
Saint Joseph Monastery

Yefet Street is one of the main streets of Jaffa and historical road from Old Jaffa to the south. It was named after Noah's son Japhet, founder of the city according to one legend. It links the Clock Square to Bat Yam, where it continues as Balfour Street.

Yefet Street forms the boundary between the historic neighbourhoods of Old Jaffa, Ajami and Giv'at Aliyah (Jabaliya) to the west, and the newer neighbourhoods of Tzahalon, Shikunei Hisachon, Neve Golan and Yafo Gimel to the east of the street.

== History ==
The street was once a way around the walls of old Jaffa, and after the demolition of the wall and the growth of the city, became a major commercial street. It was called "Ajami Street", after Ibrahim al-Ajami, the Persian companion of the Prophet. It was part of a road between Jaffa and Gaza. Its bridge over Yehuda Hyamit Street bridge was built during the British Mandate.

On the Survey of Palestine map from 1944, the sections of what would become Yefet Street were named, north to south: Shari' El Madaris; Shari' El Hulwa; Tariq Abu Es Su'ud.
