= Jaffa Clock Tower =

Building in the greater Tel Aviv

Coordinates: 32°03′18″N 34°45′22″E

- מגדל השעון יפו
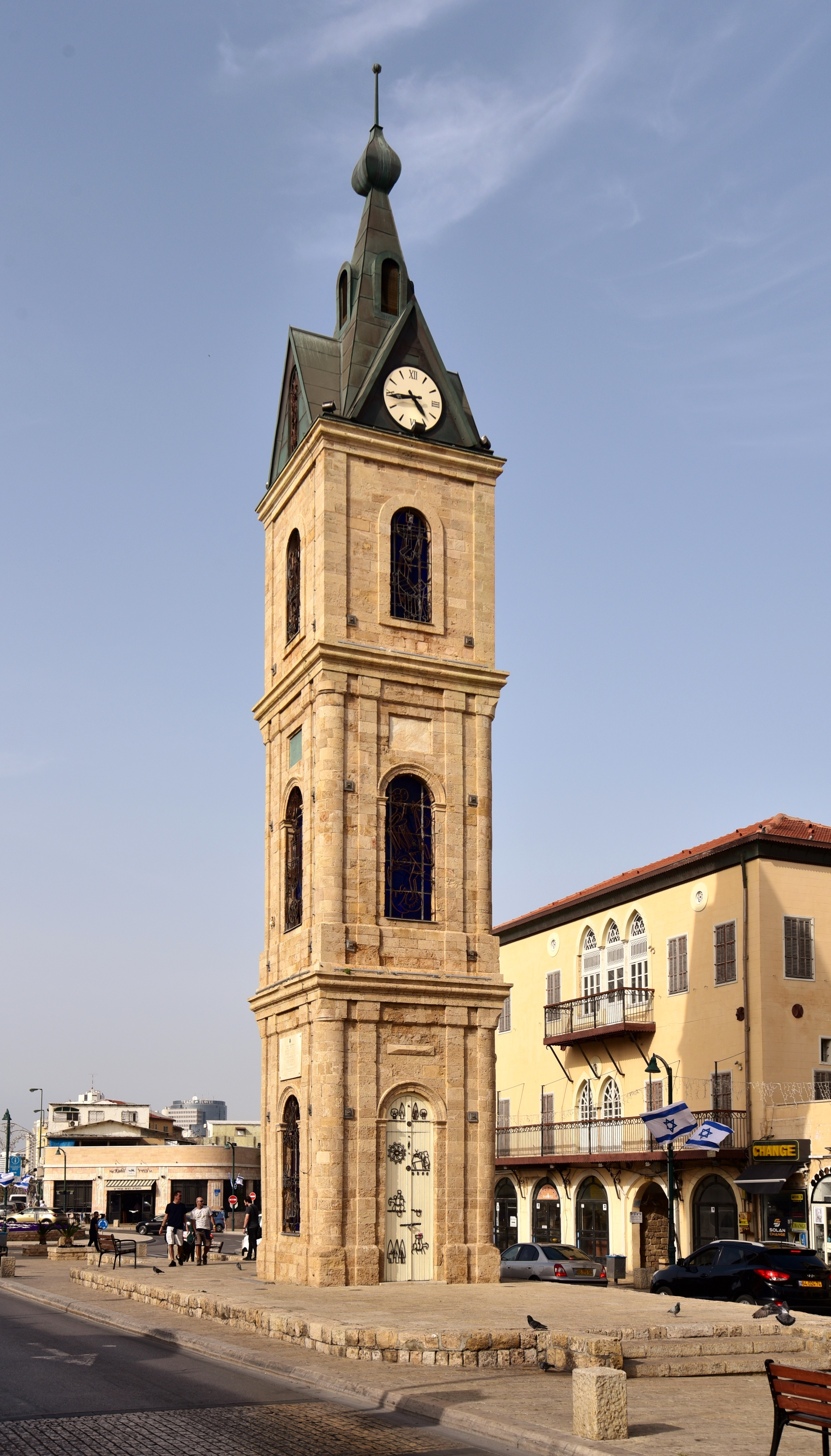
- Interactive map of the Jaffa Clock Tower area
- Alternative names: برج الساعة في يافا

General information
- Type: Clock tower
- Architectural style: German, Ottoman influenced
- Location: Tel Aviv, Israel, Yefet Street
- Construction started: 1900
- Completed: 1903

Technical details
- Floor count: 3

The Jaffa Clock Tower (Hebrew: מגדל השעון יפו, Migdal haShaon Yafo, Arabic: برج الساعة في يافا, Turkish: Yafa Saat Kulesi) stands in the middle of the north end of Yefet Street in Jaffa, Tel Aviv.

The limestone tower was constructed in 1900 and initiated by Joseph Bey Moyal, a Jewish businessman from Jaffa, and was made possible with contributions from all communities of Jaffa, including Jews, Armenians, Maronites and Arabs. It was constructed to commemorate the silver jubilee of the reign of the Ottoman Sultan Abdul Hamid II. It also helped develop the center of the town, in a time when Jaffa was undergoing rapid modernization.

The tower, which incorporates two clocks, is one of seven clock towers built in Ottoman Palestine. The others are located in Safed, Acre, Nazareth, Haifa, Nablus. A plaque was later inserted to commemorate the Israelis killed in the battle for the town during the 1948 Arab–Israeli War.

== History ==
The construction of the tower was initiated by Joseph Bey Moyal, a prominent Jewish businessman from Jaffa, who was also the mind behind the Jaffa–Jerusalem railway. The construction was made possible with contributions from all the communities of Jaffa, Arabs, Armenians, Maronites and Jews. The watch mechanism itself was done by Moritz Schoenberg, a Jewish clock-maker from Rishon LeZion who also built a few stores in the adjacent Negib Bustros St. (now Raziel St.). The official goal was to commemorate the silver jubilee of the reign of the Ottoman Sultan Abdul Hamid II, however, the local community had a lot to gain, as Jaffa was going through a rapid process of modernisation and urbanisation, and the building of the clock tower helped develop the vibrant and well-functioning centre of town alongside the market, the bank and many new offices and shops.

The cornerstone was laid in September 1900. Within a year two floors were built and the construction of a third floor had begun. In 1903 the clock tower had been erected and Schoenberg designed and installed four clocks at its top. It is similar to the clock tower of Khan al-Umdan in Acre that is dedicated to the same purpose. More than a hundred similar clock towers were built throughout the Ottoman Empire due to this occasion.

In 1965 or 1966 the Jaffa Clock Tower was renovated, new clocks were installed and colorful stained glass windows describing the history of Jaffa and designed by Arie Koren were added. During a second restoration in 2001, the original mechanism of the clock and the bell were found. After the clock mechanism broke down in 2021, a highly skilled clockmaker identified the hidden problem and is in the process of fixing it.

In 2004 the clock tower appeared on an Israeli stamp worth 1.3 shekels. It was together with the clock towers in Safed, Acre, Haifa and Jerusalem featured in a series of "Ottoman Clock Towers in Israel".

== See also ==
- List of clock towers

== Bibliography ==
- Petersen, Andrew (2001). A Gazetteer of Buildings in Muslim Palestine (British Academy Monographs in Archaeology). Vol. I. Oxford University Press. pp. 174−175. ISBN 978-0-19-727011-0.
