= St. Peter's Church, Jaffa =

Franciscan Catholic church

St. Peter's Church
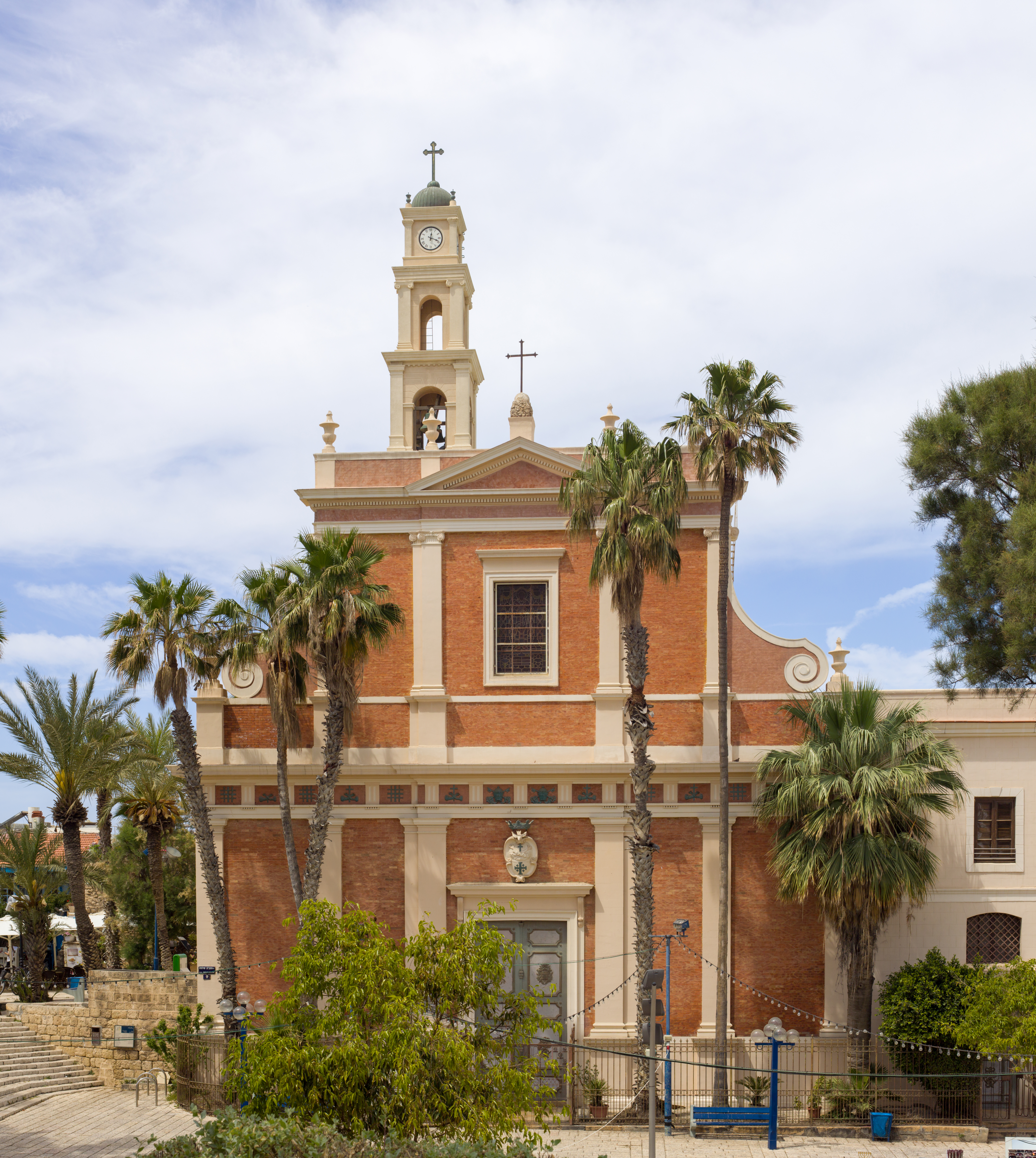
- St. Peter's Church in 2013

Religion
- Affiliation: Roman Catholicism
- Leadership: Franciscans
- Year consecrated: 1654

Location
- Location: Jaffa, Tel Aviv, Israel
- Interactive map of St. Peter's Church
- Coordinates: 32°3′17.2″N 34°45′7.5″E

Architecture
- Style: New Spanish Baroque
- Groundbreaking: 1888
- Completed: 1894

Specifications
- Direction of façade: Southeast
- Spire: 1

St. Peter's Church (Arabic: نيسة القديس بطرس, Hebrew: כנסיית פטרוס הקדוש) is a Franciscan Catholic church in Old Jaffa, now part of Tel Aviv, Israel.

== History ==
=== Ottoman period ===
The church was built in 1654 and dedicated to Saint Peter, over a medieval citadel that was erected by Frederick I and restored by Louis IX of France at the beginning of the second half of the thirteenth century. However, in the late eighteenth century the church was twice destroyed and consequently twice rebuilt. The current structure was built between 1888 and 1894 and most recently renovated in 1903.

=== Today ===
Masses are conducted in English, Spanish, Polish, and Hebrew. A schedule is available at the church and it is open to the public every day. Among contemporary worshippers are Polish foreign workers who come here to pray on Saturdays, their day off.

== Architecture ==
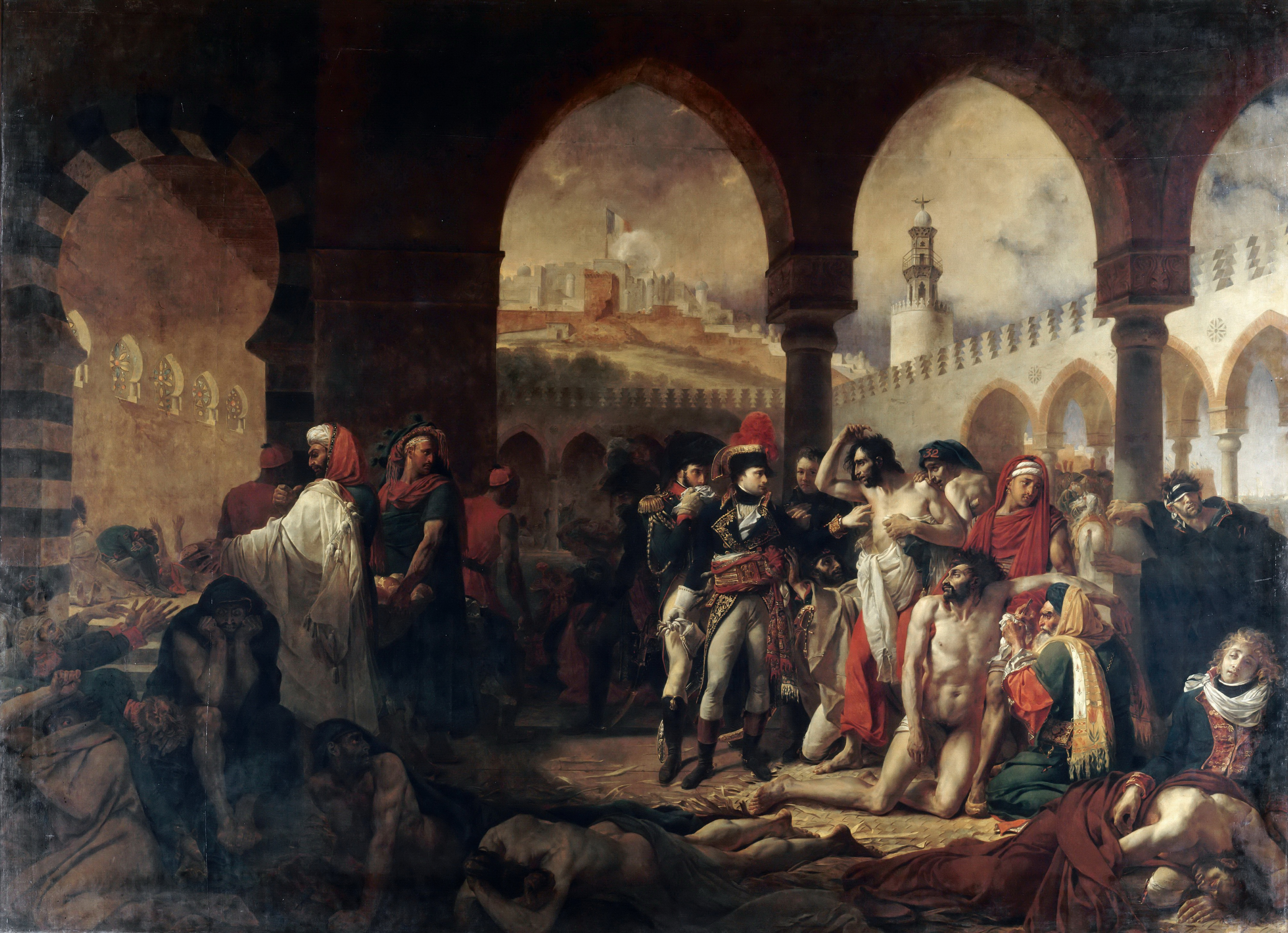
Bonaparte Visiting the Plague Victims of Jaffa

With its tall, brick façade and towering bell tower, St. Peter's Church is the single largest and most distinctive building in Old Jaffa. The interior of the church is reminiscent of cathedrals in Europe, with a high vaulted ceiling, stained glass, and marble walls. The stained glass was manufactured in Munich by renowned artist Franz Xaver Zettler. The four panels in the interior of the church depict episodes from the life of St. Peter, including the miraculous catch of fishes, the giving of the keys, the transfiguration of Jesus on Mount Tabor and the washing of the feet at the Last Supper. With the exception of depictions of Tabitha, Francis of Assisi, and the Immaculate Conception, all of the other windows in the church depict Spanish saints, which is unsurprising since the present building was erected by the Spanish Empire. Also of note is the pulpit which is carved in the shape of a lifelike tree.

St. Peter's Church also contains thirteenth century remnants of St. Louis' citadel located outside and to the right of the sacristy. The remnants include two whole rooms which are circular in shape, have low ceilings and fire embrasures. It is in these rooms that Napoleon is said to have lived while he was at St. Peter's in 1799 during the French campaign in Egypt and Syria.

=== The monastery ===
The outer walls of the monastery are of a light colour and without decor. It is divided into two parts. The eastern section is built around a courtyard, to whose south is the wall of the church; to its west are rooms. On the western and southern side there is an arcade. In the middle of the courtyard there is a statue of Louis IX. There is a large round tower, a remnant of the ancient citadel is the north western corner of the courtyard, in its basement is a stone capella. There are narrow stairs that lead up from the basement to the monastery's library in which there are mostly written works as well as books in Polish.

The western side of the monastery is higher, and there reside the monks. In that section there is also the kitchen and the repractory. There are also prayer rooms. From the upper floor of this building there are views of the mediterranean sea as well as to Andromeda's rock. The entire structure was renovated in the 2000s, today there are 4 monks who live in the building, 2 Poles, an englishman and a Chilean.

== Significance ==
The church was constructed on its present location because of the significance Jaffa has to Christianity. It was in Jaffa that Saint Peter raised Tabitha, one of Jesus' disciples, from the dead according to the Acts of the Apostles, Acts 9:36–43, Acts 10:1–4. The church is dedicated to him.

Since the large church is located on a hill near the shore, the building has historically dominated the view of Jaffa from the sea, thus serving as a beacon to pilgrims, signaling that the Holy Land is near.

== Gallery ==
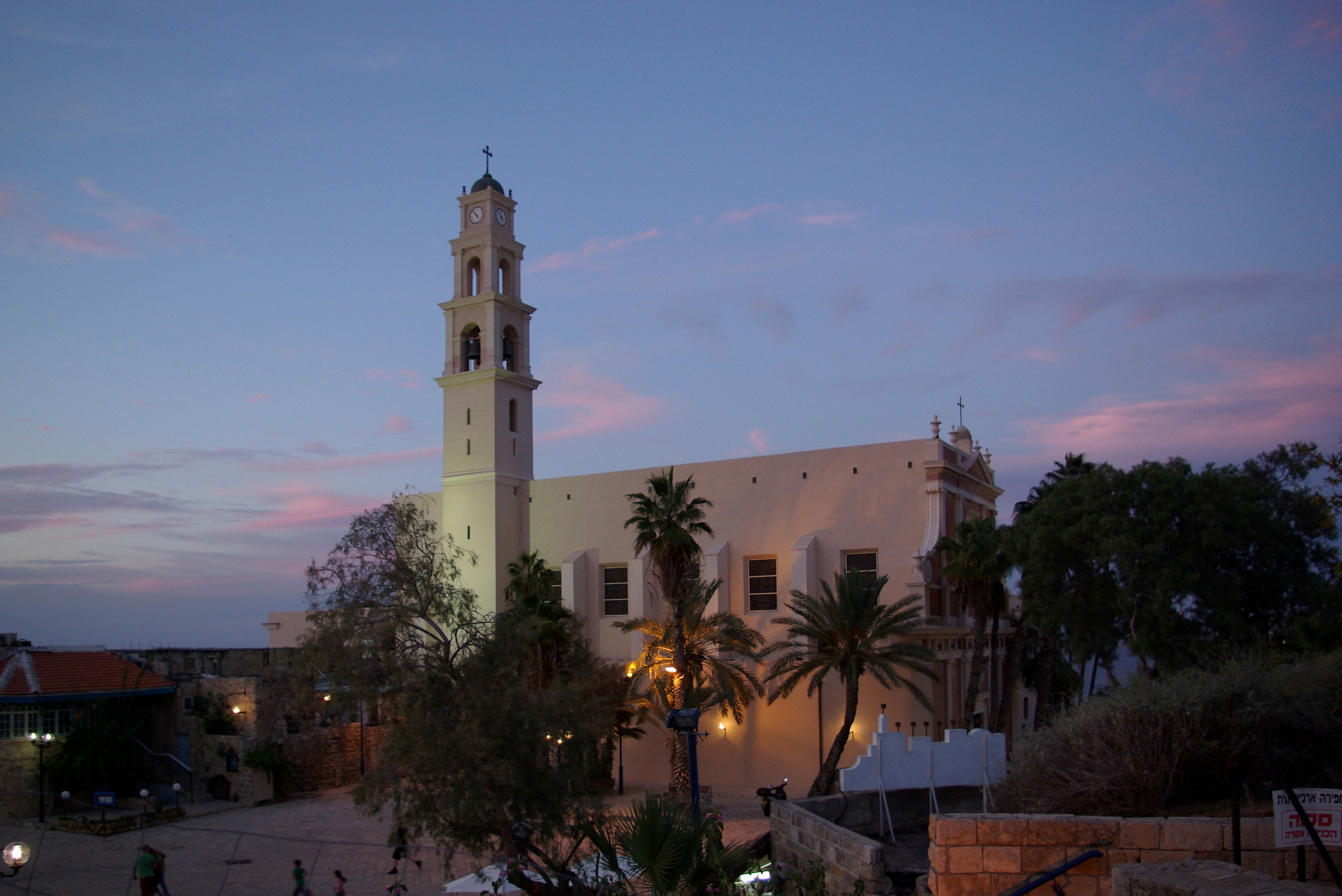
View from the south at night

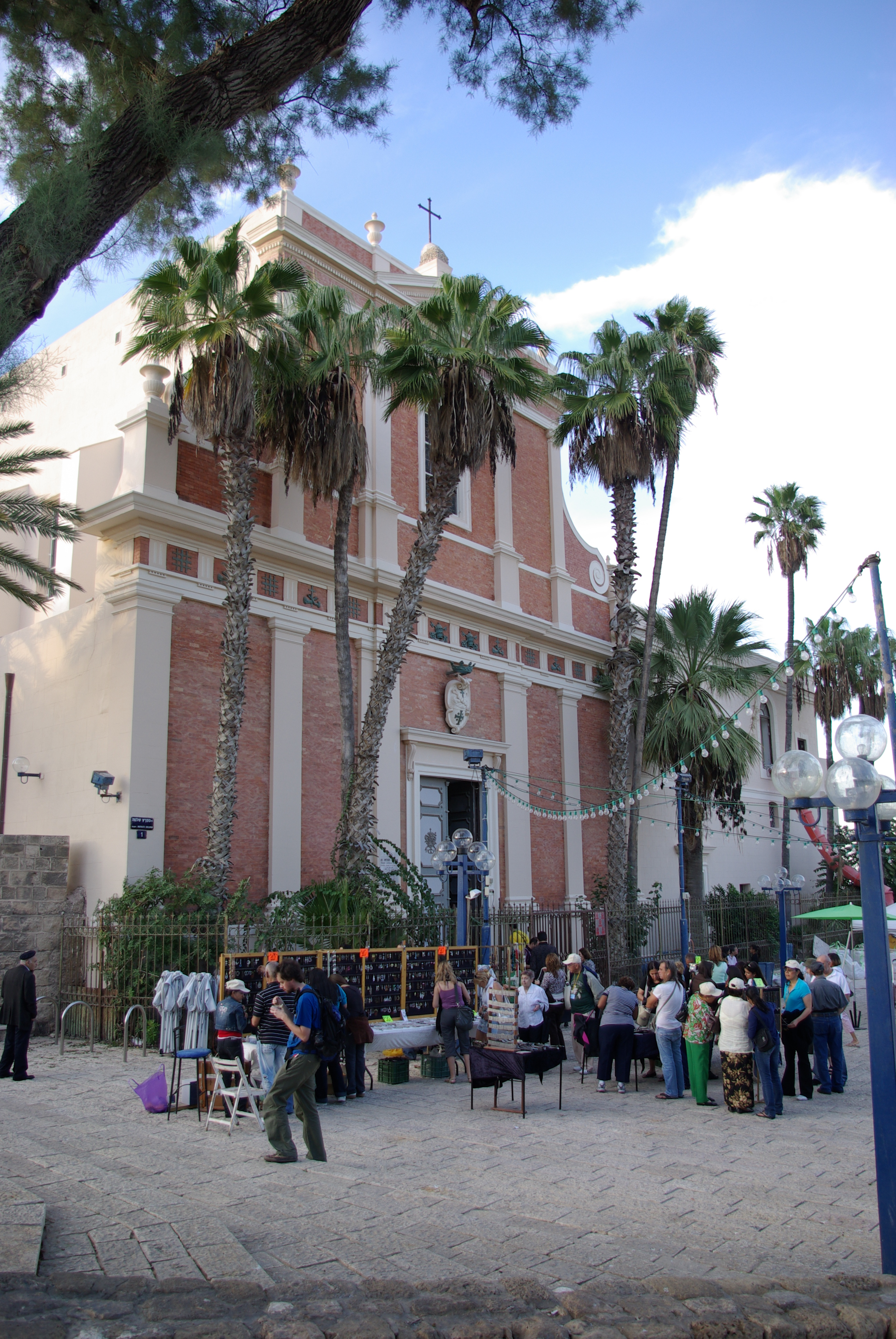
Church entrance

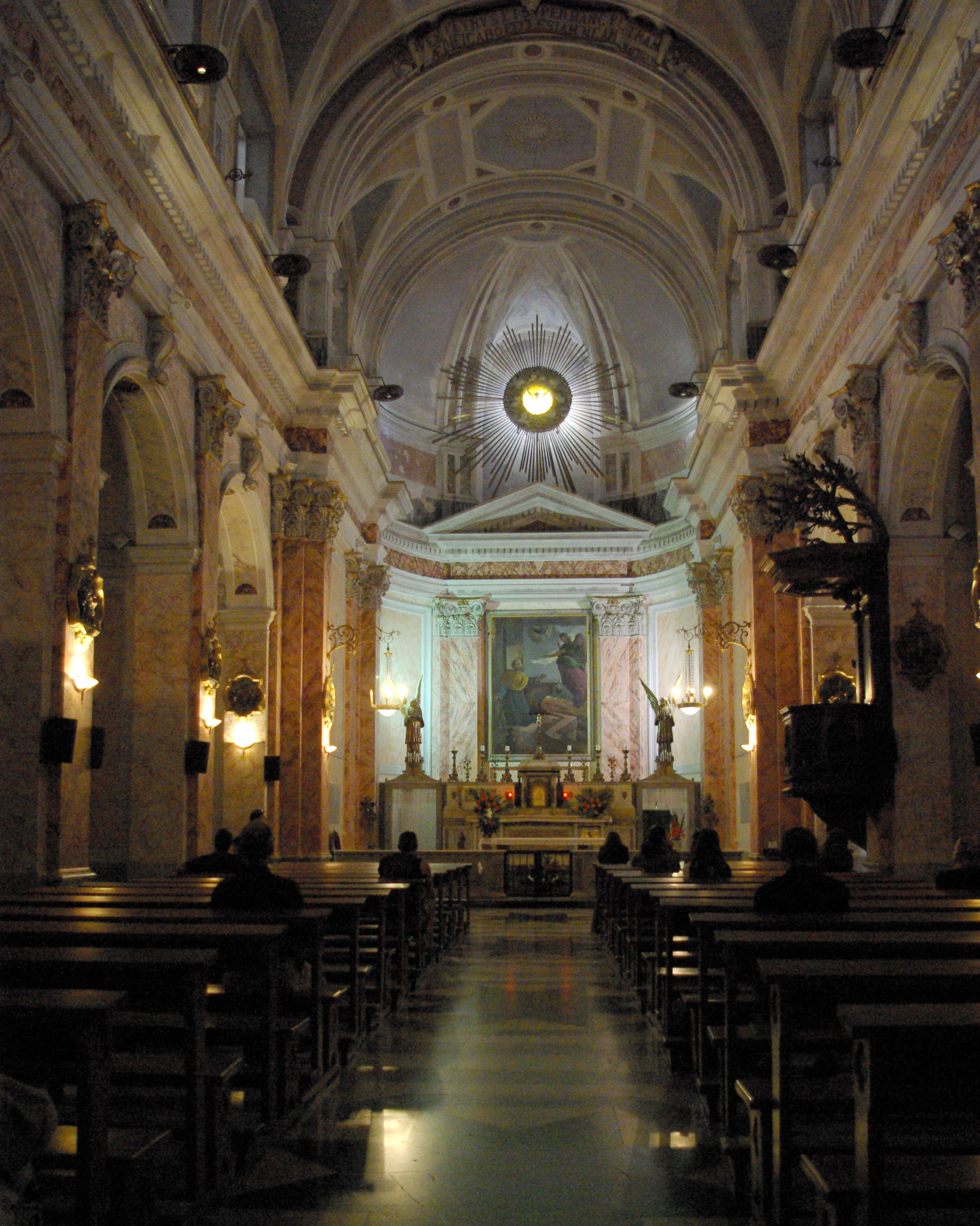
Church interior

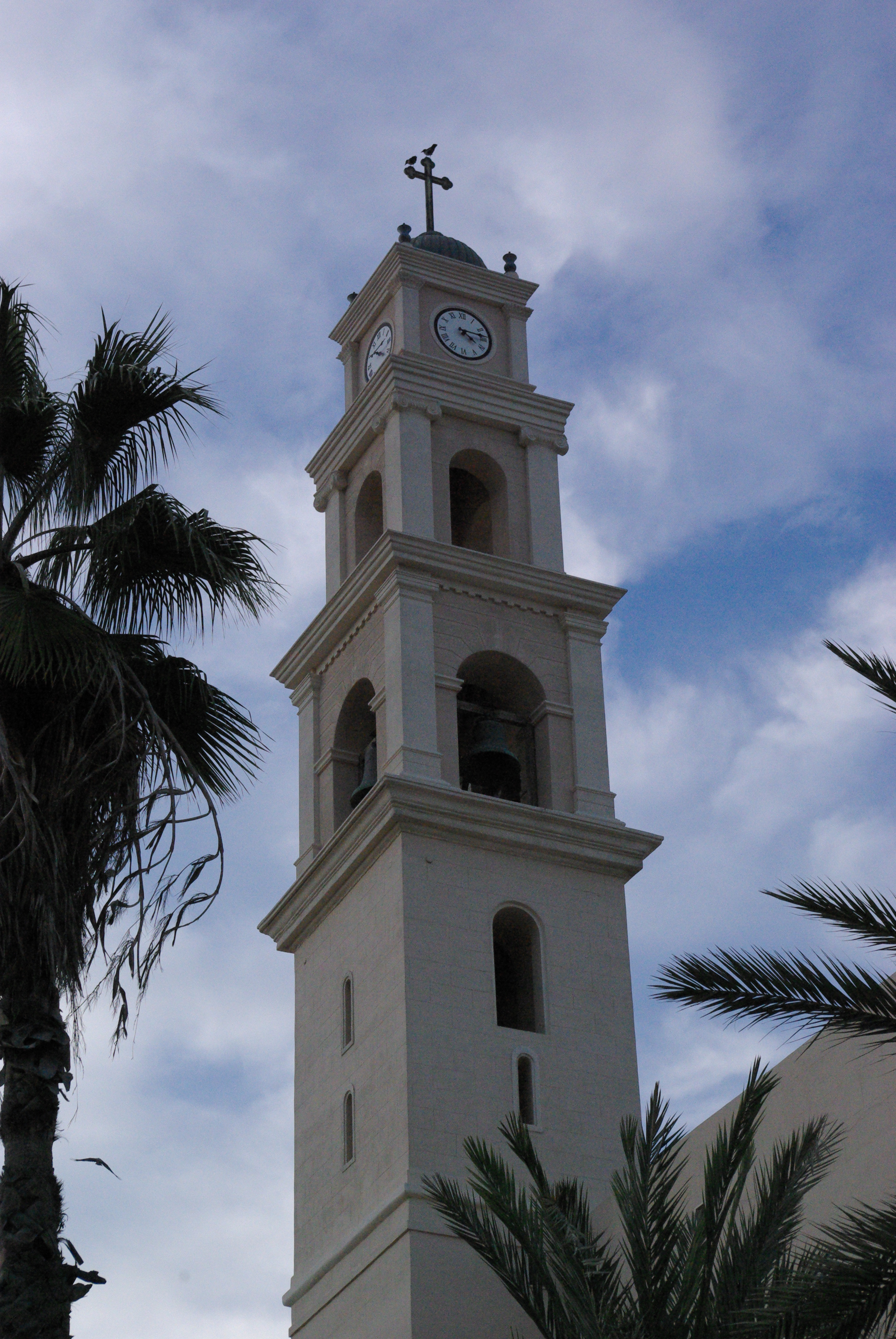
The bell tower of the Church

== See also ==
- St. Peter's Basilica
- Church of the Primacy of St. Peter
- Church of St. Peter in Gallicantu
- Church of the Transfiguration
