= Jaffa Port =

Ancient Mediterranean port in Tel Aviv, Israel

Coordinates: 32°03′13″N 34°44′58″E

- נמל יפו (Hebrew); ميناء يافا (Arabic)
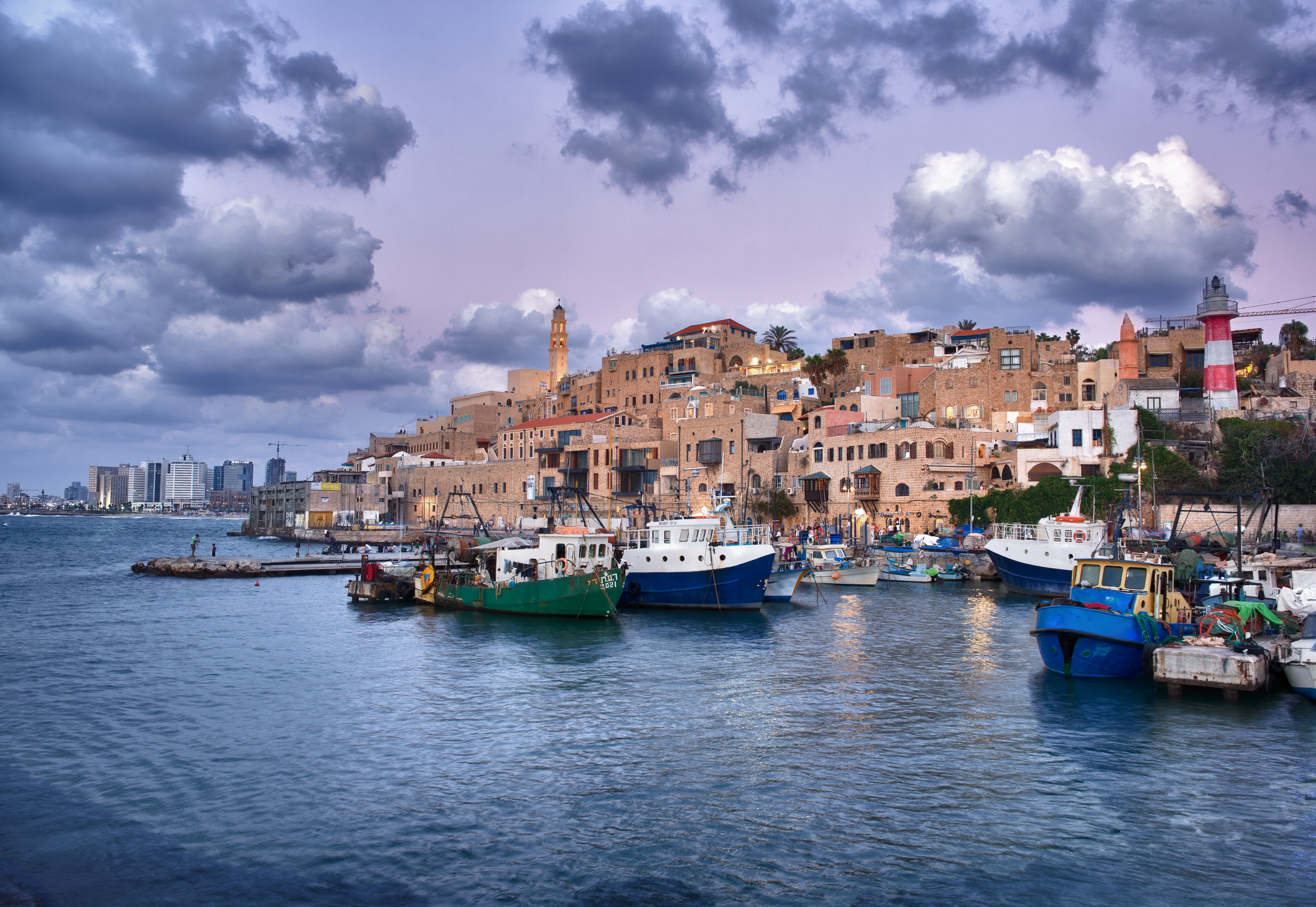
- Jaffa Port (2013)
- Interactive map of Jaffa Port
- Type: Ancient port
- Location: Jaffa, Tel Aviv, Israel

History
- Original use: Fishing and trading port

Site notes
- Current use: Fishing harbour, yacht harbour, tourist destination

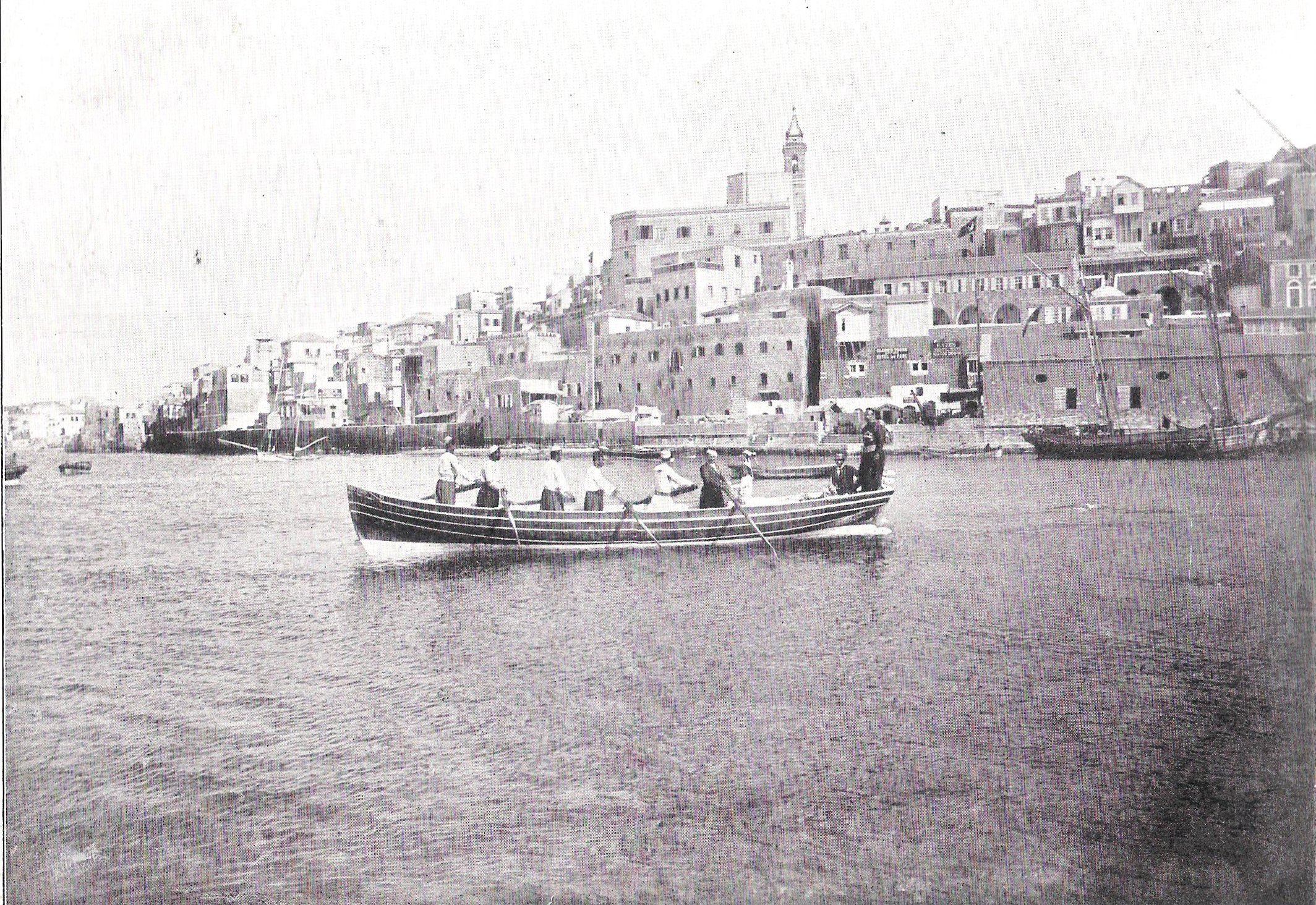
Jaffa Port (before 1899)

Jaffa Port (Hebrew: נמל יפו, Nemal Yāfō; Arabic: ميناء يافا, Menʿā Yāfā) is an ancient port situated on the Mediterranean Sea. It is located in Old Jaffa within Jaffa, Tel Aviv, Israel. Archaelogical finds and mentions of the port dating back to close to 4000 years indicate that it may be one of the oldest ports in the area.

It has also been called the "Port of Ramleh" and the "Port of Jerusalem".

Today the port serves as a fishing harbor, a yacht harbor, and as a tourist destination. It offers a variety of cultural and food options, including restaurants where fresh fish and seafood is served.

== History ==
Archaeological and historical discussions describe very long-term use of the port area, beginning in the Early Bronze Age or earlier phases of settlement, with reuse over millennia. Dig evidence indicates an Egyptian New Kingdom fortress or gateway in Jaffa, showing Egyptian control and settlement during the Late Bronze Age.

=== Biblical period ===
Jaffa port is mentioned several times in the Bible. The cedars of Lebanon which Hiram King of Tyre sent for the building of Solomon's Temple came via Jaffa port, mentioned in 2 Chronicles2:16.

"We will cut whatever timber you need from Lebanon, and bring it to you as rafts by sea to Jaffa; you will take it up to Jerusalem."

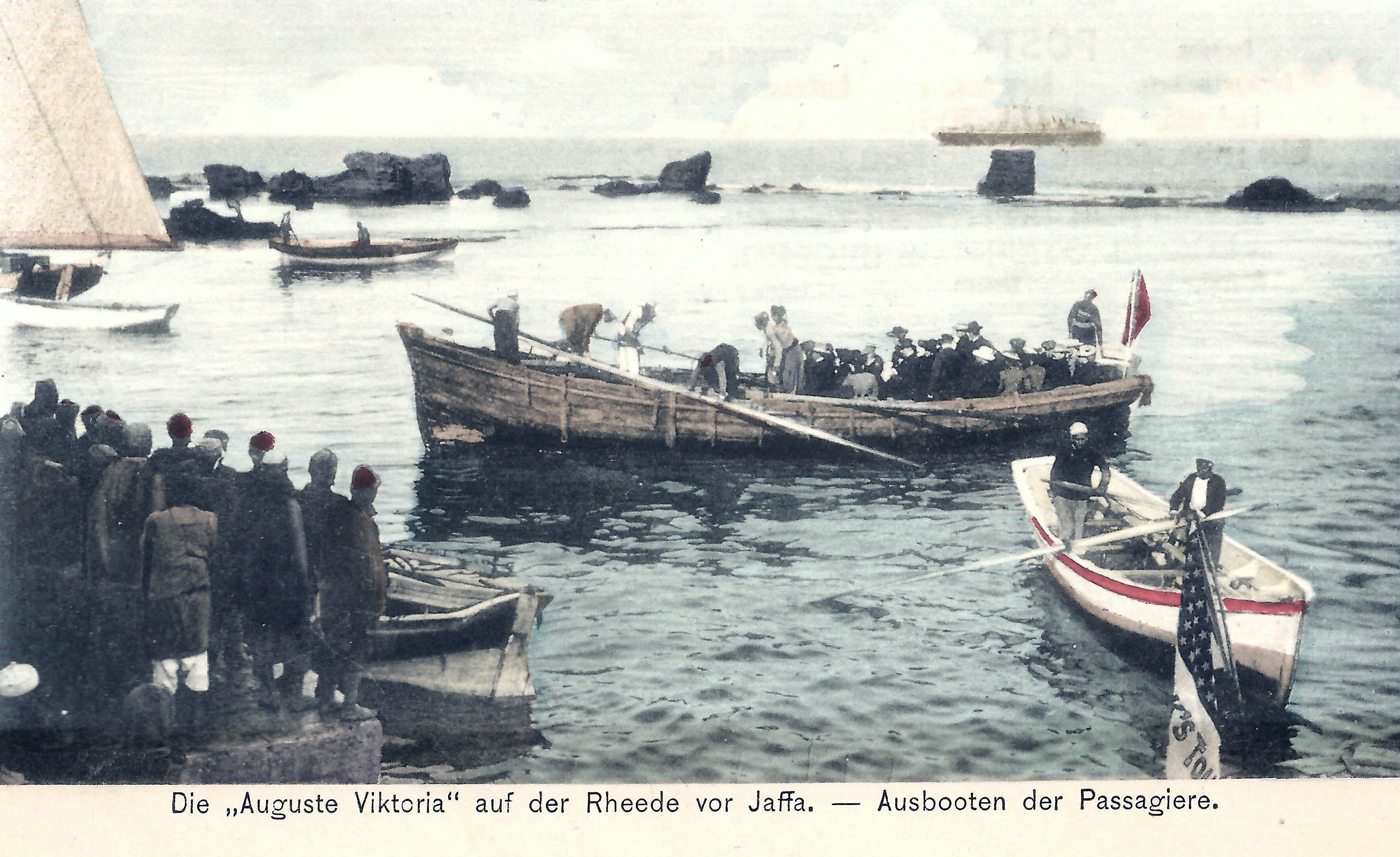
Pilgrims being rowed into Jaffa port 1900

It is also mentioned regarding materials and workmen for the building of the Second Temple of Jerusalem in Ezra 3:7.

"So they gave money to the masons and the carpenters, and food, drink, and oil to the Sidonians and the Tyrians to bring cedar trees from Lebanon to the sea, to Jaffa, according to the grant that they had from King Cyrus of Persia."

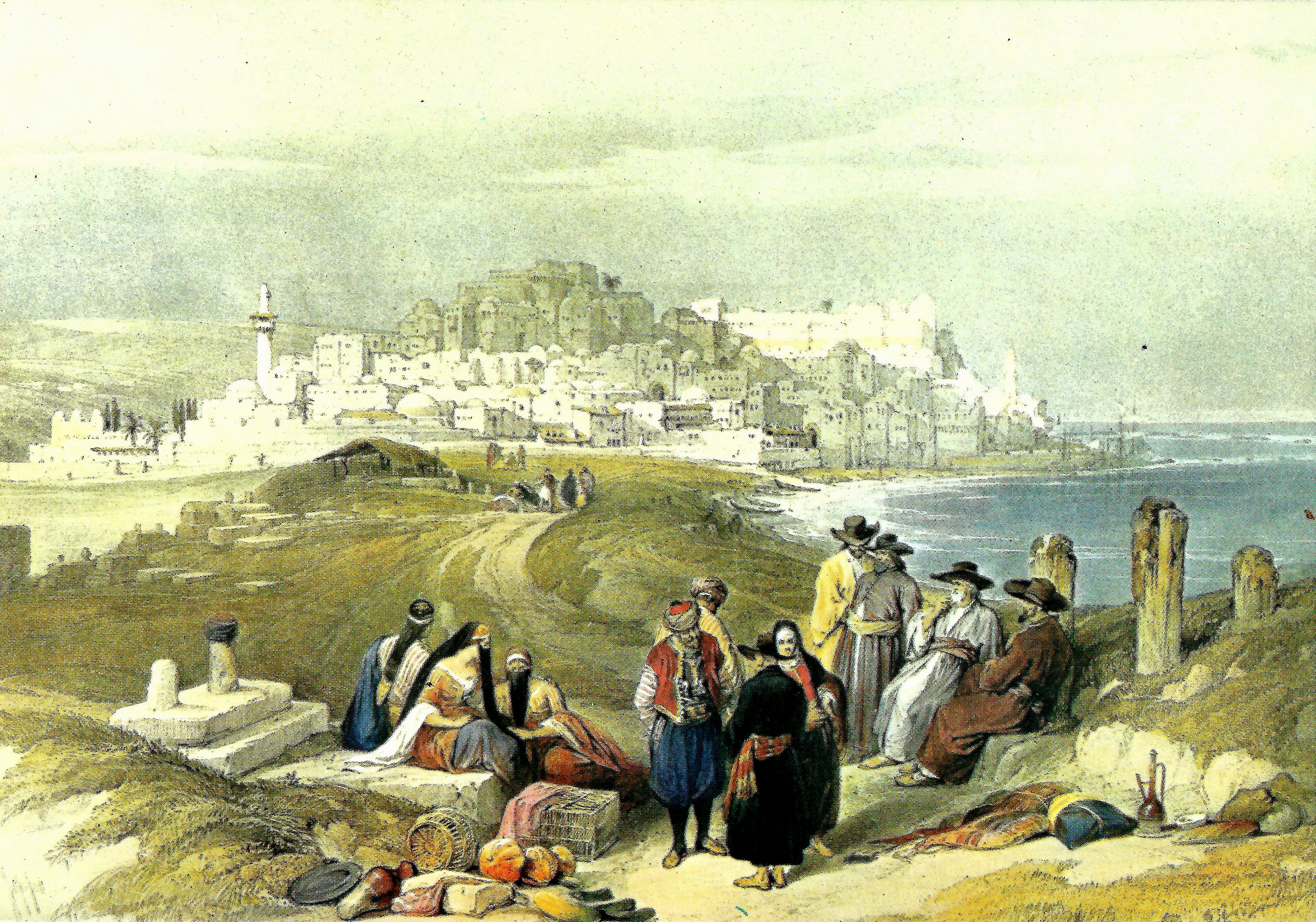
Jaffa port as portrayed in one of David Roberts’s paintings, 1839

When Jonah refused God's mission to prophecy against Nineveh he boarded a ship at Jaffa bound for Tarshish (Jonah 1:3)

"But Jonah set out to flee to Tarshish from the presence of the Lord. He went down to Joppa and found a ship going to Tarshish; so he paid his fare and went on board, to go with them to Tarshish."

These highlight the fact that Jaffa’s harbor of those days was able to handle ships that travelled large distances.

=== Roman period ===
Josephus describes the poor quality port during the First Century CE and the absence of an inland harbor. Pilgrims arriving in Jaffa had to transfer from their large vessels into small boats, encountering dangers to reach land.

During the Hasmonean revolt Judah Maccabee burned the harbor in retaliation for the drowning of 200 Jaffan Jews as mentioned in II Macabees 12:3-7.

=== Arab Period (636-1099) ===
When Ramle was the capital of the Muslim empire the port of Jaffa became increasingly important. It served as a storage center for merchant shipping and as the port of entry for pilgrims.

=== Crusaders (1099-1268) ===
Jaffa was conquered by the Crusaders in 1099 by Genoese ships that arrived in the port and brought supplies to Jerusalem. The first four Crusades landed in Jaffa. Although Acre served as the main port for the Kingdom of Jerusalem during much of the period, Jaffa’s proximity to the city of Jerusalem made it the preferred gateway for pilgrims.

After Saladin captured the city in 1187 King Richard the Lionhearted launched the Third Crusade and landed in Jaffa. His victory over Saladin in the Battle of Jaffa during September 1192 lead to a truce and the Treaty of Jaffa, which ensured three years of access to the holy sites in Jerusalem.

In 1229 the Holy Roman Emperor Frederick II led the Sixth Crusade and used Jaffa as his base. He signed another agreement with the Ayyubid ruler al-Kamil. This gave the Crusaders ten years of control of Jerusalem without any fighting.

=== Mamluk period (1268-1517) ===
When it seemed that the Crusades would be renewed, and to prevent the Crusaders from making inroads the Mamluks burned many towns along the coast and destroyed the ports, including the port of Jaffa.

=== Ottoman period (1517-1917) ===
For the early part of the Ottoman period the port was not used very much. However beginning in the 18th century activity grew tremendously.

During the Napoleon's 1798 campaign to disrupt British trade routes in the Mediterranean, he used the Jaffa port to transfer munitions. Joseph Ganteaume (1755–1818), one of Napoleon's admiral, commanded that cannons and ammunition from Alexandria be transferred to Jaffa to help Napoleon's attack against Acre:

"The great need of the supreme commander in siege cannons for the conquest of Acre [Akko] requires that you take all necessary steps to beach in Jaffa not only cannons 24 that you have embarked in Alexandria, as well as four cannons. You can moor if the weather is good, or remain under sails anear the town in case of bad weather."

The opening of the Suez canal and the building of a railroad from Jaffa to Jerusalem (launched in 1892) required that the port be expanded. A new quay was built in 1887 for small boats by Sultan Abdul Hamid II who introduced infrastructure projects.

When he visited the Holy Land German Kaiser Wilhelm II arrived via the Jaffa port in 1898, and met Binyamin Ze’ev Herzl, who had also arrived through the Yafo Harbor. As a result of this visit tourism and commerce via the port increased.

By the end of the Ottoman period, Jaffa was considered the second most important city next to Jerusalem, primarily due to its being the main port city to supply Jaffa and Jerusalem.

==== Commercial Activity ====
According to Frederick Hasselquist during the 18th century four thousand pilgrims and an equal number of Jews arrived via the Jaffa port. Rice and other grains were imported and soap, cotton and Jaffa oranges were exported.

In 1872 52 ships from France arrived 53 from the Austrian Lloyd, 52 from Russia, 10 Egyptian ships and 3 “others". 40,000 people arrived.

From the 1880s six shipping lines and five passenger lines began to come to Jaffa on a regular basis:

- Massageries Maritimes - a French line from Marseille with stops in Beirut, Haifa, Jaffa, and Egypt every 10 days.
- Austrian Lloyd- an Austrian line from Trieste to Egypt, Jaffa, Sidon, Alexandretta and Marseille every 12–15 days
- Russian Company of Steam Navigation and Trade (ROPit) - a weekly passenger ship that left Odessa every Wednesday with stops in Instanbul, Izmir, Beirut, Haifa, Jaffa and Alexandria, and brought thousands of pilgrims to the Holy Land.
- Khedival Mail Line - An Egyptian line that left Alexandria with stops in Port Said, Jaffa, Haifa, and Beirut
- Maritima Italiana and Servizi Maritimi - Italian ships that left from Venice and Genoa to Jaffa and Alexandria

=== British Mandate (1923-1948) ===
The period of the British Mandate was one of expansion and development for Jaffa.

Concurrently the shipping and freight activity in the port increased and with it, the need to expand the port to accommodate this. Various improvements were made throughout the 1920s and 1930s including diverting the railway line from Lydda to bring it closer to the Jaffa port and Tel Aviv.

When Arab riots broke out in April 1936 Haj Amin Al Husseini, head of the Arab Higher Committee, declared a general strike, which included the Arab workers at Jaffa port, among them barge owners, barge workers, and warehouse workers. Since the overwhelming number of workers at the port were Arabs, this effectively shut down the work of the port. Although the strike ended in October, the volume of activity was reduced by up to 50% as many ships and commercial activity had been transferred to the Tel Aviv and Haifa ports and did not return to Jaffa.

With the advent of World War II, all the Mandatory government shut down all ports except for Haifa. At the end of 1945 the port resumed activity with the export of oranges. However it did not resume its previous glory.

=== Israel (since 1948) ===
In 1950, the Jewish city of Tel Aviv and the Arab city of Jaffa were unified under the Tel Aviv-Yafo Municipality. The operations of the port was transferred to the Tel Aviv Port Authority and its activities were changed from commercial cargo which moved primarily to Ashdod port, to leisure activities such as recreational boating.

In 1952, the port of Jaffa became a unit of the Ministry of Transportation and later, a part of the Old Jaffa Development Company.

The port was declared an ‘architectural reserve’ and has been renovation as a center for tourism, art, and entertainment, The Israel Antiquity Authority protects and manages listed historic buildings and conducts archaelogical studies.

== Port of Jerusalem ==
Jaffa has long been considered the port of Jerusalem as it was the standard route for pilgrims to the Holy Land coming from Europe.

Many pilgrims and visitors write about Jaffa and call it the "port of Jerusalem". Among them, Captain Gravier d’Ortierès, on a mission for Napoleon, Purdy, Italian Alessandro Bassi in his trip in 1856, Louis Klopsch in 1904, ministers leading pilgrims and others.

== Descriptions by writers and artists ==
Writers and pilgrims who arrived wrote about the poor conditions at Jaffa’s harbor, remarking that ships had to anchor outside and leave the area immediately with bad weather. The would have to disembark onto small boats to get to land. Often these boats often could not reach the shore, and the passengers had to be carried on the backs of Arab porters.

In Napoleon Bonaparte’s memoirs (1830), he writes,

“Il y a un port en mauvais état pour les petits bâtiments, et une rade foraine passable.”

Purdy wrote in 1826

"This is a small, fortified town, and its port is merely a long, narrow, shallow basin, enclosed by rocks, and the roadstead is unsafe in winter even for the boats of the country. . . .There is plenty of water here, but that within the walls is very bad."

Mark Twain (1835–1910) described the narrow and dangerous entrance to the port when he visited in 1867 The Innocents Abroad.

Artists drew, painted and photographed the rocks, seawall and quays of Jaffa's port. Among them are Gustav Bauernfeind (1848–1904) is a graphic representations of the seawall or quay and the adjoining strip of beach, Jaffa by Olfert Dapper, Jaffa and its harbor from the north by Cornelis de Bruyn (1698), Jaffa vel Ioppen by Antonius Gonzales (1665), Jaffa engraving by Electus Zwinner (1661), Iaffa, engraving by Dutch Henri de Beauveau (1615), Jaffa engraving the Belgian pilgrim Jan Zuallaert (1587).

== See also ==
Avitsur, Shmuel, Jaffa Port in Its Prime and in Its Decline, (Hebrew) 1972
