= List of lighthouses in Israel =

Lighthouses in Israel

The lighthouses of Israel are all located along its 273 kilometres (170 mi) coastline. Most of the Israel's coastline faces west on the Mediterranean Sea, with a short coastline at the southern tip of the country, on the Gulf of Eilat/Aqaba. Israel's main ports are the Port of Haifa and the Port of Ashdod on the Mediterranean, and the Port of Eilat on the Gulf of Aqaba. All lighthouses except Eilat Light are located along the Mediterranean coast, between Ashkelon in the south and Akko in the north. Israel's active lighthouses are maintained by the Israeli Shipping and Ports Authority, a statutory authority within the Ministry of Transport and Road Safety.

Based on historical, numismatic and archaeological evidence, archaeologists believe that the Romans built a lighthouse on an islet near the harbor entrance of Akko. Remains of a colossal lighthouse mentioned by the Roman Jewish historian Josephus Flavius were discovered at Caesarea Maritima.

The lighthouses of Israel are included in the National Geospatial-Intelligence Agency's List of Lights publication 113 for the Mediterranean Sea and 112 for the Gulf of Eilat. They are listed by the United Kingdom Hydrographic Office on volume E of the Admiralty List of Lights & Fog Signals. They are also listed on The Lighthouse Directory and on the ARLHS World List of Lights. The chart above follows The Lighthouse Directory's inclusion criteria, namely, it includes lightbeacons having a height of at least 4 metres (13 ft) and a cross-section, at the base, of at least 4 square metres (43 sq ft) (a lightbeacon is defined as a beacon displaying a light, where a beacon itself is a fixed, that is, not floating, aid to navigation). The listing is from north to south.

== Mediterranean Sea ==
Name	Status	Image	Coordinates	Location
Akko Light	active		32°55′9.43″N 35°3′59.22″E	Acre
Haifa Lee Breakwater Light	active		32°49′22.36″N 35°0′31.19″E	Haifa
Stella Maris Light	active		32°49′41.25″N 34°58′0.56″E	Haifa
Mikhmoret Light	active		32°24′9.69″N 34°52′2.21″E	Mikhmoret
Herzliya Light	active		32°9′56.9″N 34°47′33.35″E	Herzliya
Reading Light	inactive		32°6′12.86″N 34°46′37.11″E	Tel Aviv
Jaffa Light	inactive		32°3′12.45″N 34°45′1.82″E	Jaffa
Ashdod Light	active		31°48′50.06″N 34°38′46.79″E	Ashdod
Ashkelon Marina Breakwater Light	active		31°41′6.93″N 34°33′22.04″E	Ashkelon
Ashkelon Coal Jetty Breakwater Light	active		31°38′25.68″N 34°31′11.88″E	Ashkelon

== Gulf of Eilat ==
Name	Status	Image	Coordinates	Location
Eilat Light	active		29°30′1.14″N 34°54′54.78″E	Eilat

== See also ==
- Lists of lighthouses and lightvessels
