= Jaffa Light =

Jaffa Light Yafo
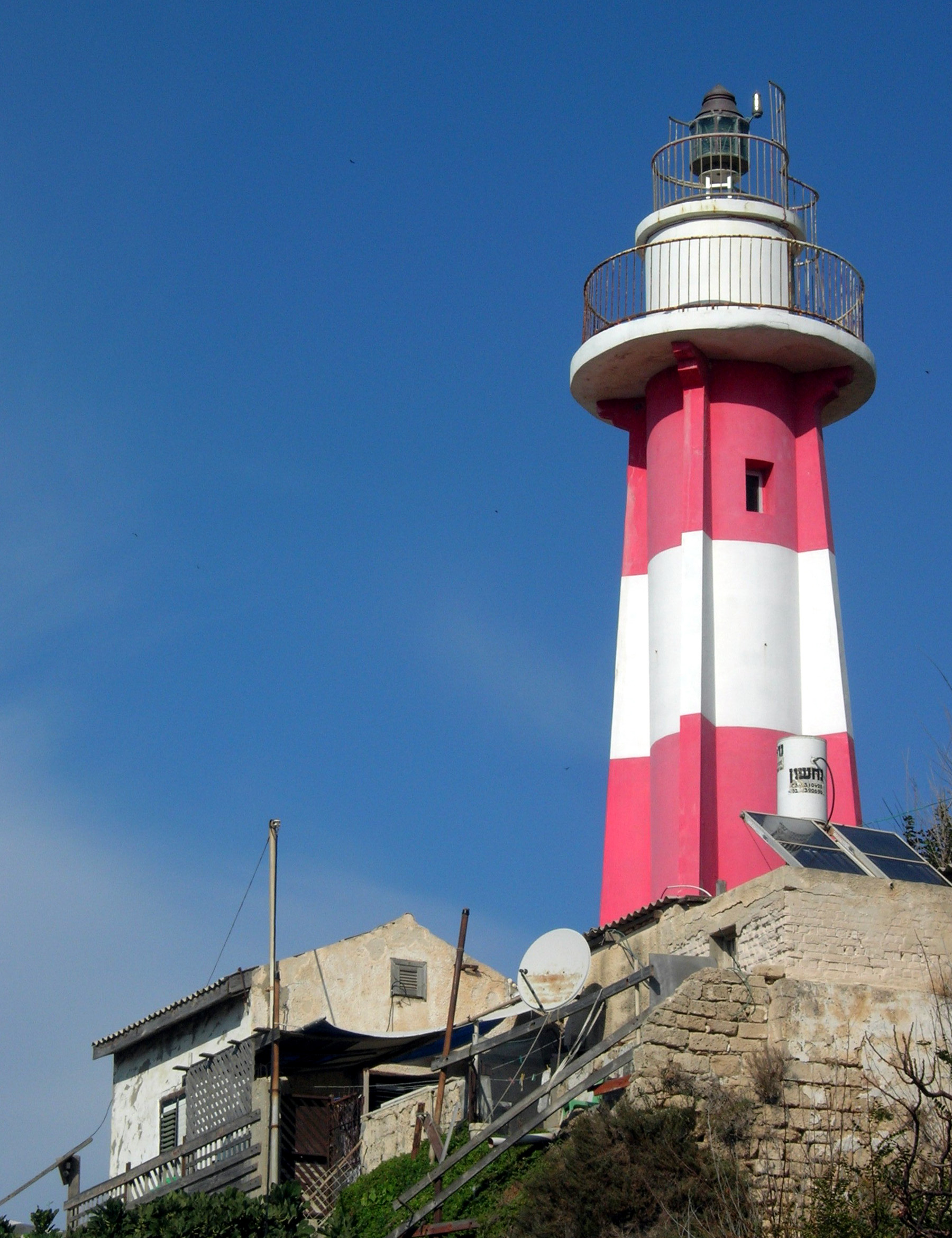
- Jaffa Light, 2006
- Location: Jaffa, Tel Aviv, Israel
- Coordinates: 32°3′12.45″N 34°45′1.82″E

Tower
- Constructed: 1865
- Construction: concrete tower
- Height: 10 metres (33 ft)
- Shape: cylindrical tower with four ribs, lantern and gallery
- Markings: red and white horizontal bands tower

Light
- First lit: 1936
- Deactivated: 1966
- Focal height: 10 m (33 ft)
- Characteristic: Fl (4) W 14s.

Jaffa Light (Hebrew: מגדלור יפו) is a lighthouse in Jaffa, Tel Aviv, Israel. It is located on a hilltop above the old Jaffa Port, in the historical part of the city. It operated between 1865 and 1966, although now deactivated it is still used as a daylight navigation aid.

== History ==
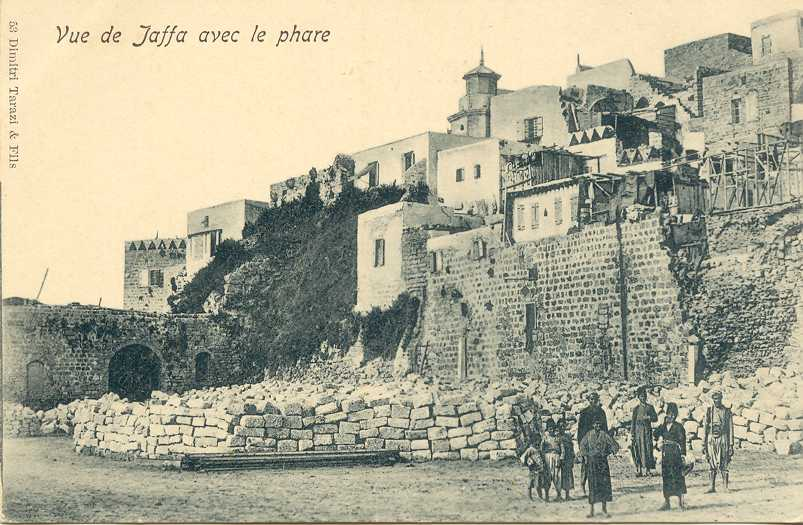
Jaffa Light, c. 1900

Jaffa Light was built by French engineers in 1865. It was constructed as part of operations carried out by the Ottoman authorities to improve the port facilities, mainly due to the increase in export of citrus fruit, and especially oranges, the well known "Jaffa oranges".

The lighthouse keeper from 1875 was an Armenian who came from Jerusalem. He was trained by the same French company who built the lighthouse. Around 1938 his son was trained by the same French company and replaced him, probably as result of the lighthouse being rebuilt. His grandson, Abu George, was the "technician", responsible for keeping the lamp lit. The son was the official keeper until the lighthouse was shut down in 1966.

In 1936 the British expanded the port and rebuilt the lighthouse. The light source used in this lighthouse was a Carbide lamp.

In 1965 the Port of Ashdod was built, replacing Jaffa Port. In 1966 the glass optic was taken to be used in the Ashdod Light, and the lighthouse was deactivated. Jaffa Port become a small craft port.

The lighthouse appeared on a stamp issued on 26 November 2009 in Israel.

== See also ==
- List of lighthouses in Israel
