= Ashdod Light =

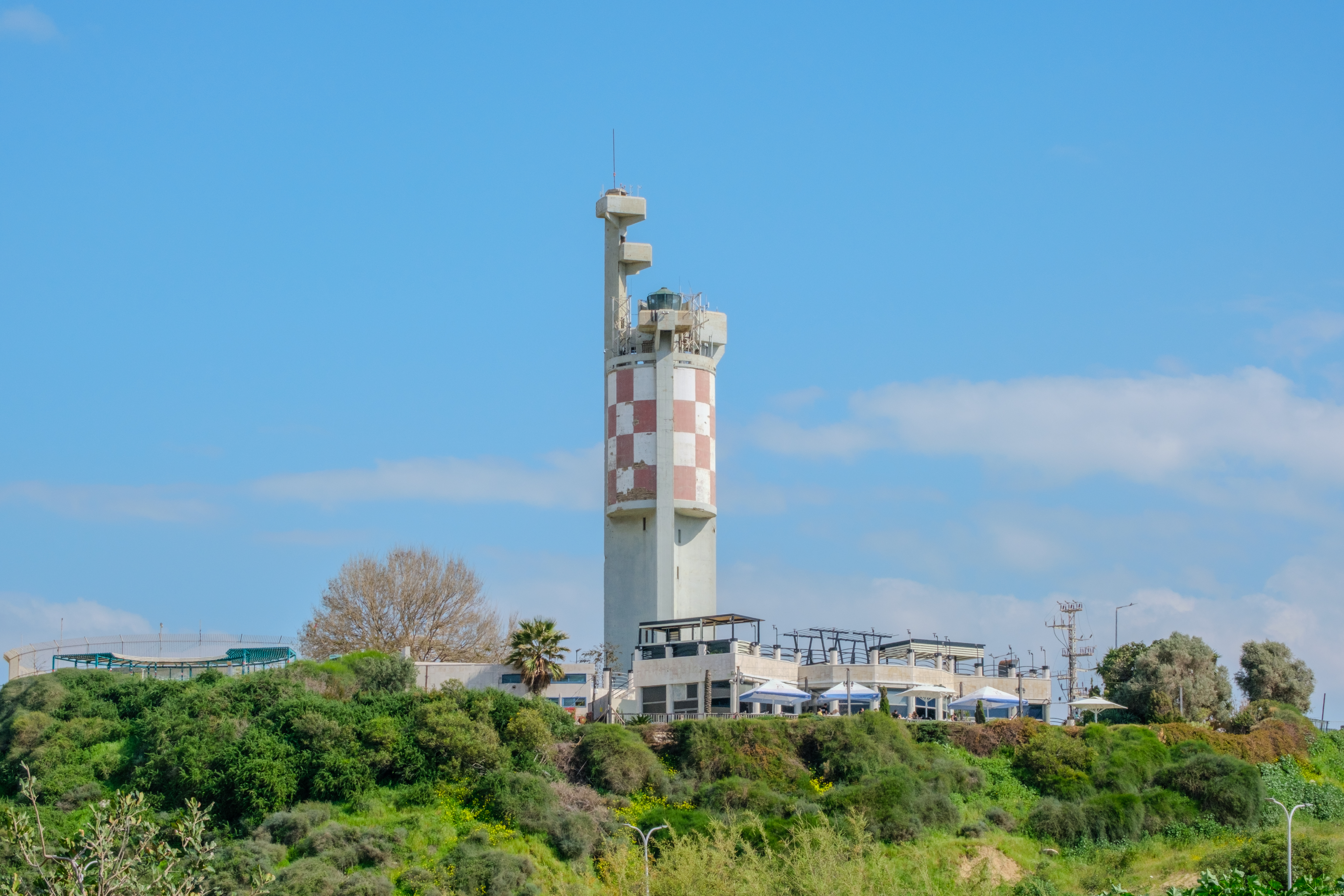
- Location: Yona Hill, Ashdod, Israel
- Coordinates: 31°48′50″N 34°38′47″E

Tower
- Constructed: 1966
- Construction: concrete tower
- Height: 42 m (138 ft)
- Shape: upper half cylindrical, lower half triangular prism
- Markings: upper half red and white checkerboard, lower half gray concrete

Light
- Focal height: 76 m (249 ft)
- Range: 22 nmi (41 km; 25 mi)
- Characteristic: Fl(3) W 20s

Ashdod Light (Hebrew: מגדלור אשדוד), is a lighthouse in Ashdod, Israel. It is located in Yona Hill (Hebrew: גבעת יונה), a 53 metres (174 ft) above sea level hill at the northern part Ashdod, just south of the Port of Ashdod. The site and the lighthouse are closed to the public.

The lighthouse is listed as active on the NGA List of Lights of 2019, as well as on the April 2021 update of The Lighthouse Directory. However, some less official sources claim that it is inactive at least since November 2009.

The lighthouse appeared on an Israeli stamp issued 26 November 2009. It also appeared on the first day of issue postmark for that series of stamps.

== History ==
The lighthouse was built in 1966 as part of the construction of the port facilities. It used the glass optic removed from the Jaffa Light which was decommissioned in the same year.

The lighthouse was a distinctive mark of the city of Ashdod, appearing in many publications.

=== Youth centre ===
In December 2020, the municipality of Ashdod announced that a youth centre is set to established at the facility beneath the lighthouse, after the transfer of power from the Ministry of Defense has been greenlit. In May 2022, it has been decided that the planned-youth centre will carry the name of Ilan Gilon, former member of Knesset of the Meretz party and deputy of mayor Zvi Zilker – following his death earlier that month. At his time as deputy mayor, he was in charge of the culture and youth in the city, and as a teenager was considered a major social activist.

== See also ==
- List of lighthouses in Israel
