= Haifa Lee Breakwater Light =

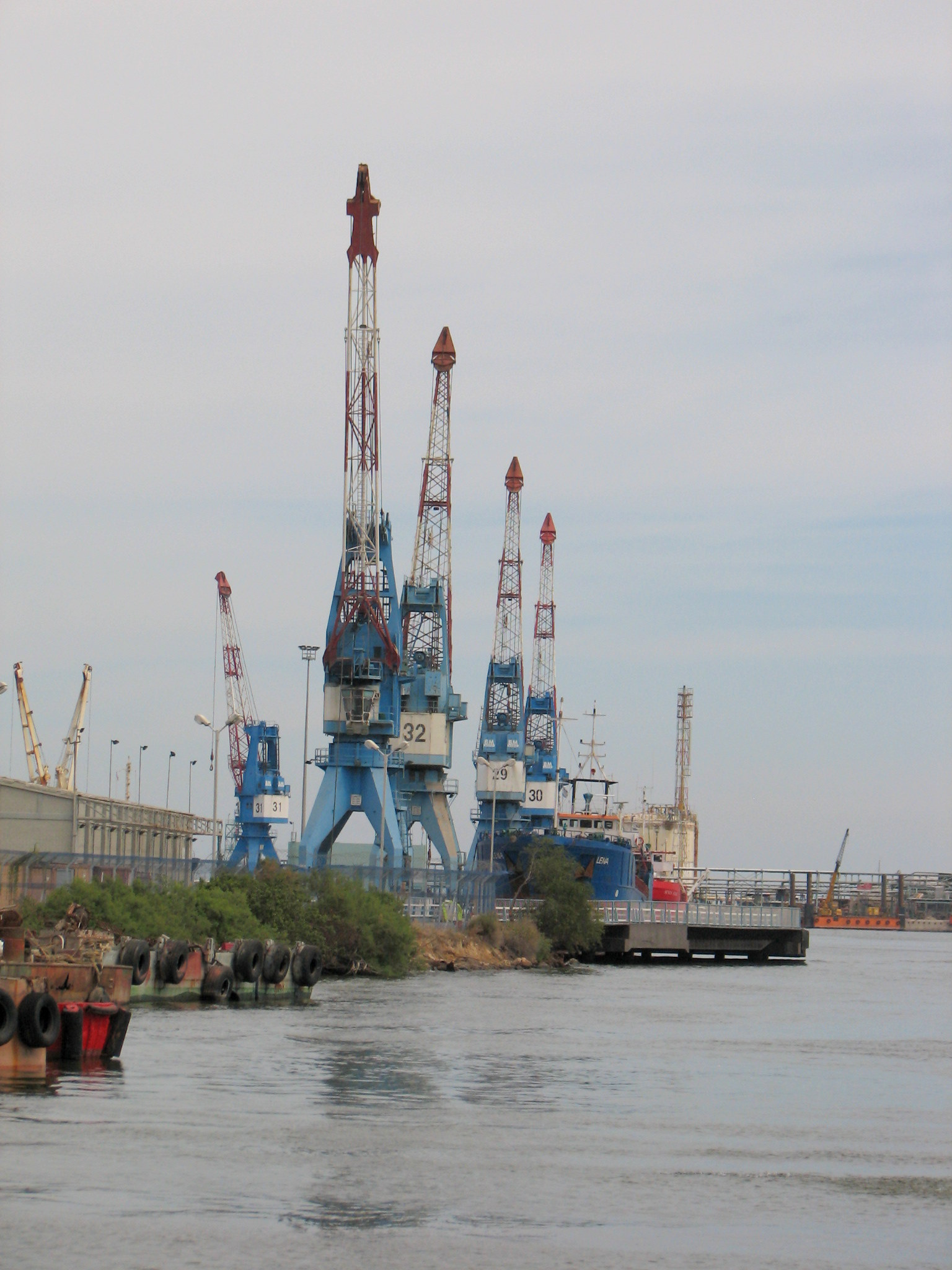
- Location: Haifa, Israel
- Coordinates: 32°49′22.36″N 35°0′31.19″E

Tower
- Constructed: 2007
- Foundation: 2-story concrete control building
- Construction: steel tower
- Height: 25 metres (82 ft)
- Shape: triangular skeletal radio tower
- Markings: white tower

Light
- Focal height: 25 m (82 ft)
- Characteristic: Fl R 3s.

Haifa Lee Breakwater Light is a lighthouse in Haifa, Israel. It is located at the end of the quay serving as the inner breakwater of the Port of Haifa.

Until 2007 the light was located on top of a 31 feet (9 m) white square concrete harbor control tower. The focal plane height was 46 feet (14 m) and the visibility range was 5 nautical miles (9 km; 6 mi). Since then, the lee breakwater has been completely redeveloped and the light was moved to a 25 metres (82 ft) skeletal triangular radar tower.

== See also ==
- List of lighthouses in Israel
