= Akko Light =

Lighthouse in the port of Acre, Israel

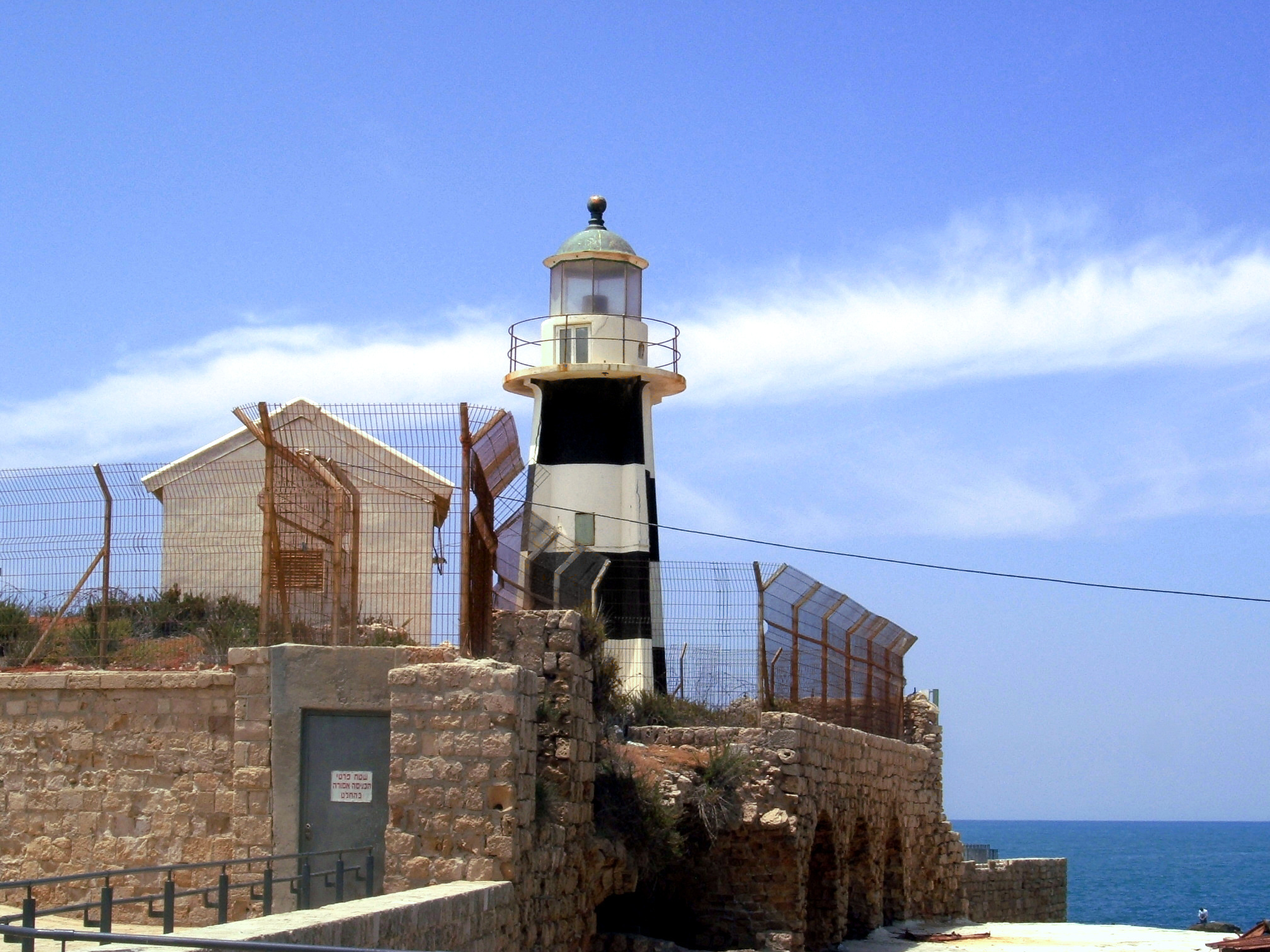
- Akko Light in 2009
- Location: Acre, Israel
- Coordinates: 32°55′9.43″N 35°3′59.22″E

Tower
- Constructed: 1864 (first)
- Foundation: concrete
- Construction: concrete tower
- Height: 33 feet (10 m)
- Shape: cylindrical tower with four ribs, balcony and lantern
- Markings: tower black and white checkerboard, grey metallic lantern dome
- Heritage: heritage site in Israel

Light
- First lit: 1912 (current)
- Focal height: 51 feet (16 m)
- Range: 10 nautical miles (19 km)
- Characteristic: Fl (2) W 7s.

Akko Light (Hebrew: מגדלור עכו) or Acre Light, is an active lighthouse in the port of Acre, Israel. It is located on the South-West corner of the city's ancient walls, at what is believed to be the former site of an Ottoman Burj-El-Sanjak (Flag Tower, Hebrew: מגדל הדגל).

== History ==
The station was established in 1864. As charts of the area were based on measures from 1862, the French navy chart of 1866 does not mentioned it, and it only appeared later on amended charts. The current structure was established in 1912.

== Structure and display ==
The main structure is a 33 feet (10 m) tapering cylindrical concrete tower with four ribs. It is painted in a black and white checkered pattern and topped with a gray metallic lantern room and a gallery. A small white painted equipment shack stands next to the tower.

The light is displayed at 51 feet (16 m). The light characteristic shown is two white flashes every seven seconds (Fl.(2)W.7s), visible for 10 nautical miles (19 km; 12 mi).

The lighthouse is closed to the public, but there is a stone stairwell going down from the base directly into the sea.

== See also ==
- List of lighthouses in Israel
