= Eilat Light =

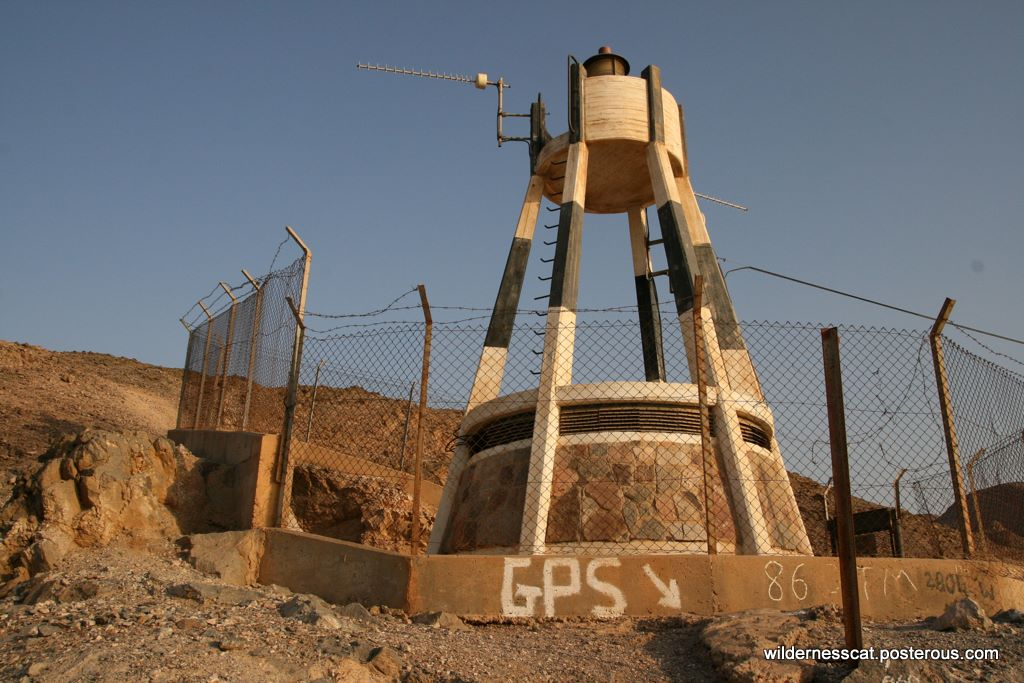
- Eilat Light, 2010
- Location: Eilat, Israel
- Coordinates: 29°29′57.7″N 34°54′46.9″E

Tower
- Foundation: cylindrical 1-story equipment room
- Construction: concrete tower
- Height: 9 metres (30 ft)
- Shape: 6-legged skeletal tower with lantern and gallery
- Markings: white with black trim and a black band around each of the legs

Light
- Focal height: 64 metres (210 ft)
- Range: 21 nautical miles (39 km; 24 mi)
- Characteristic: Fl W 10s.

Eilat Light (Hebrew: מגדלור אילת) is a lighthouse in Eilat, Israel. It is located on a bluff on the west side of the Gulf of Aqaba, about 1.2 kilometres (0.75 mi) northeast of the Egyptian border and 7 kilometres (4.3 mi) southwest of the port of Eilat. The location is locally known as "the lighthouse beach" (Hebrew: חוף המגדלור), and is used for camping and snorkeling. It is close to the "University" diving location.

The site is open, though climbing the bluff might be difficult. The tower is closed to the public.

== See also ==
- List of lighthouses in Israel
