= Stella Maris Light =

Stella Maris Light Har Carmel
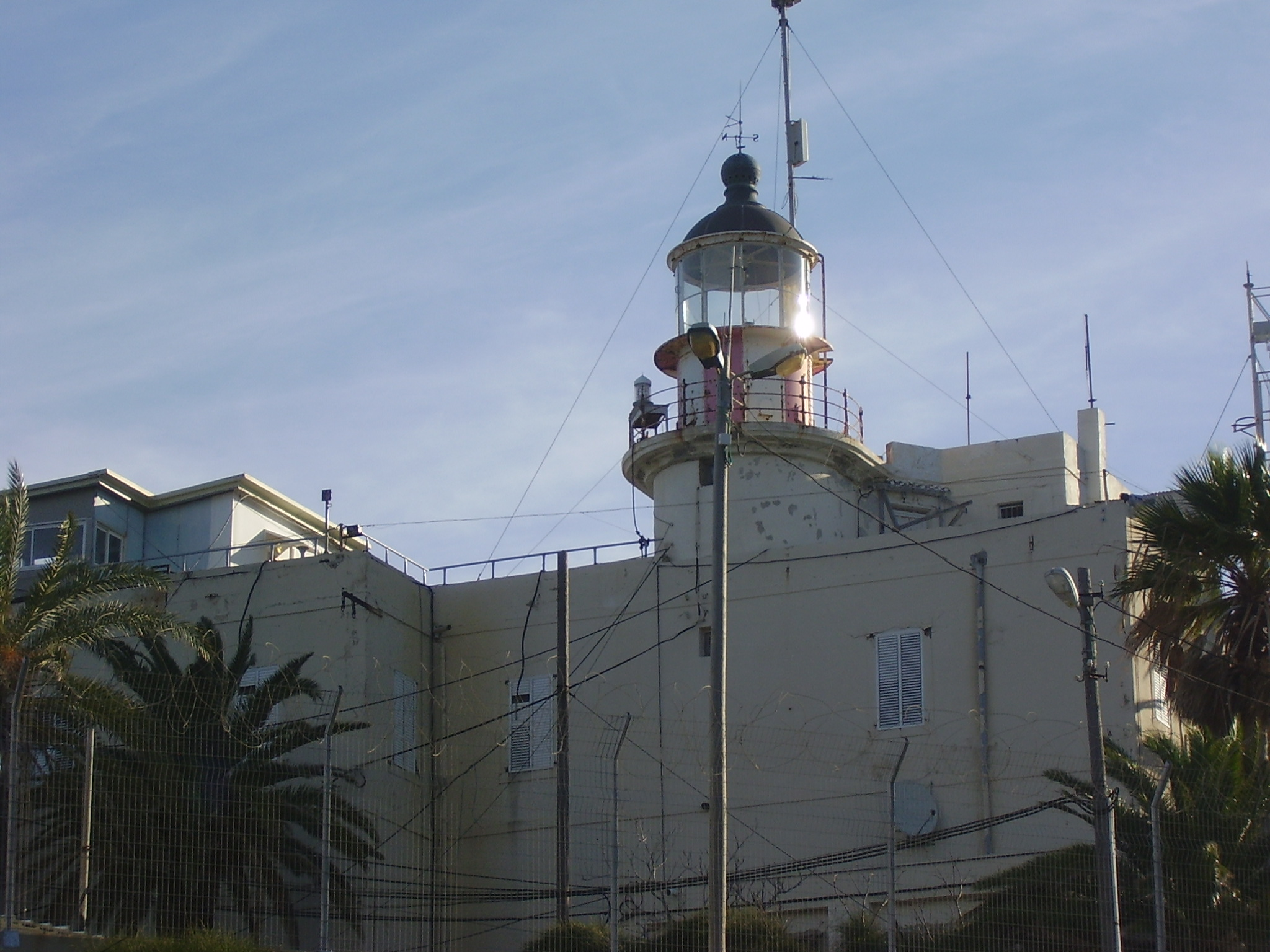
- Stella Maris Light in 2010
- Location: Haifa, Israel
- Coordinates: 32°49′41.25″N 34°58′0.56″E

Tower
- Constructed: 1864 (first)
- Foundation: 3-story building
- Construction: masonry tower
- Height: 20 metres (66 ft)
- Shape: octagonal tower with lantern and gallery
- Markings: buff tower, red and white vertical stripes on lantern, black dome

Light
- First lit: 1928 (current)
- Focal height: 179 metres (587 ft)
- Lens: Fresnel lens
- Range: 30 nautical miles (56 km; 35 mi) partially obscured
- Characteristic: Fl W 5s.

Stella Maris Light (Hebrew: מגדלור סטלה מאריס), Mount Carmel Light, Har Carmel Light or Haifa Light, is a lighthouse in Haifa, Israel. It is located on the seaward face of Mount Carmel, near Stella Maris Monastery, inside an Israeli Navy base.

The lighthouse is closed to the public and there is no access to the building. It can be viewed from nearby.

== History ==
Over the years there have been lighthouses in several locations on Mount Carmel. An ancient lighthouse was present on the mountain in Roman times. One early mention is a lighthouse located at the original site of the Stella Maris Monastery, as early as 1631.

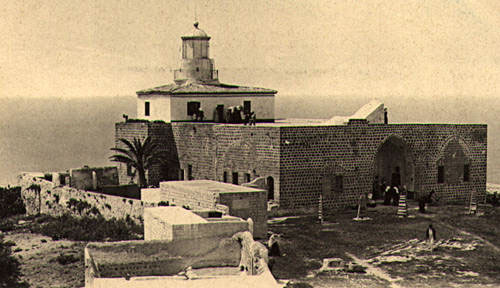
The summer residence of Abdullah Pasha at the end of the 19th century, with the old lighthouse

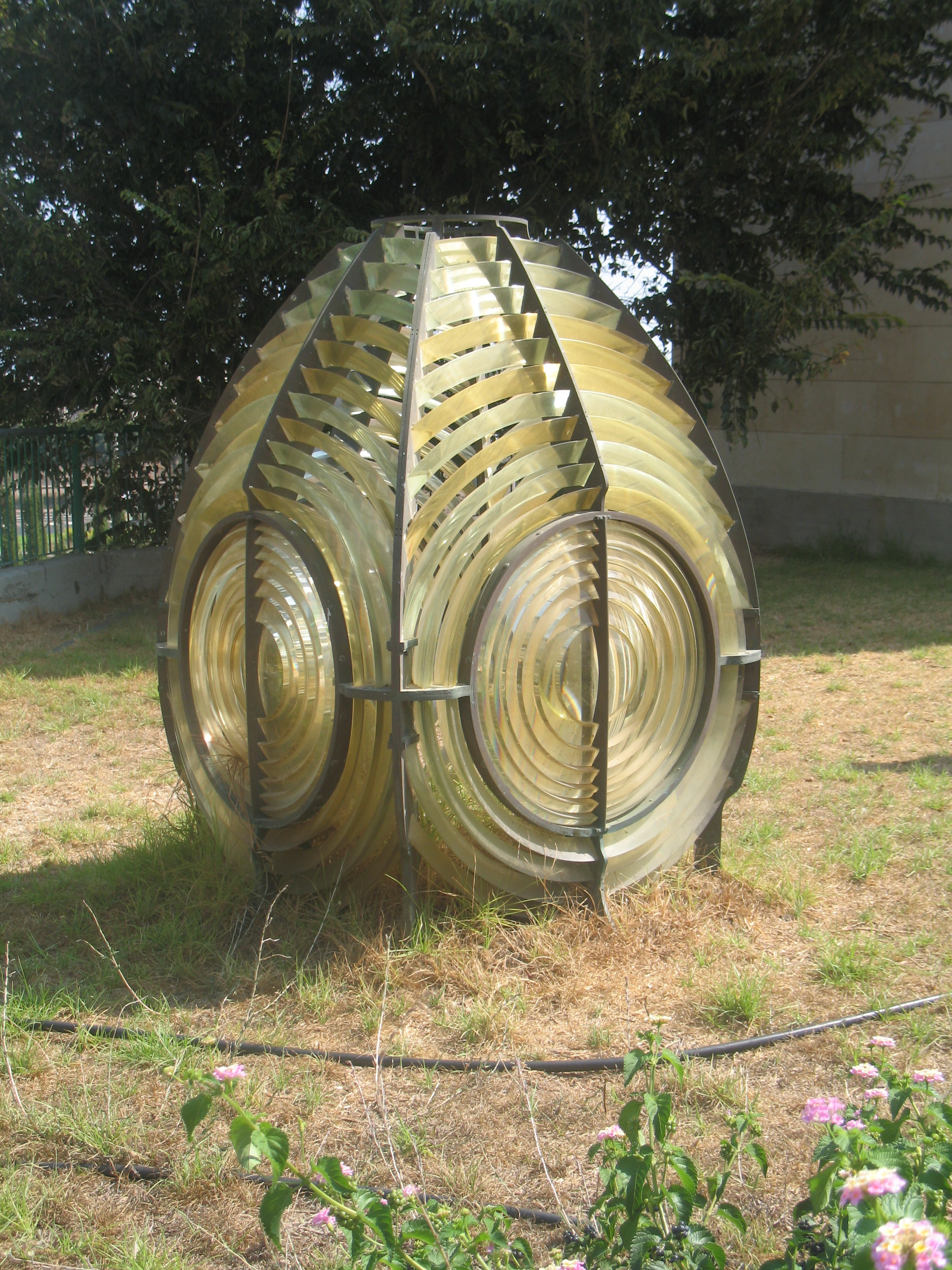
Original catadioptric apparatus from Stella Maris Light, presented at the facade of Israeli National Maritime Museum

The current location of the lighthouse is at the summer palace of Abdullah Pasha, the ruler of Acre from 1820 to 1831. The house and lighthouse were built using masonry from the Carmelite monastery that stood there, and was destroyed by order of Abdullah Pasha. In 1831 Ibrahim Pasha of Egypt captured Acre, exiled Abdullah Pasha to Egypt, and returned the building to the Carmelites.

The structure was badly damaged in the First World War. However, the building was restored in the end of the war and the Carmelites added a second floor in 1926. In 1928, with a donation by the Spanish Honorary Consul, the current lighthouse was built. The original lens, as well as plans for the original structure and catadioptric apparatus are on display at the facade of Israeli National Maritime Museum.

In the Second World War the British Army rented the house from the Carmelites to serve in the preparation to the Nazi invasion to the area. The British remained there until their evacuation at the end of the British Mandate in 1948. The building has been used by the Israeli Navy ever since.

== See also ==
- List of lighthouses in Israel
