= Ashkelon Marina Breakwater Light =

Ashkelon Marina North Breakwater Light
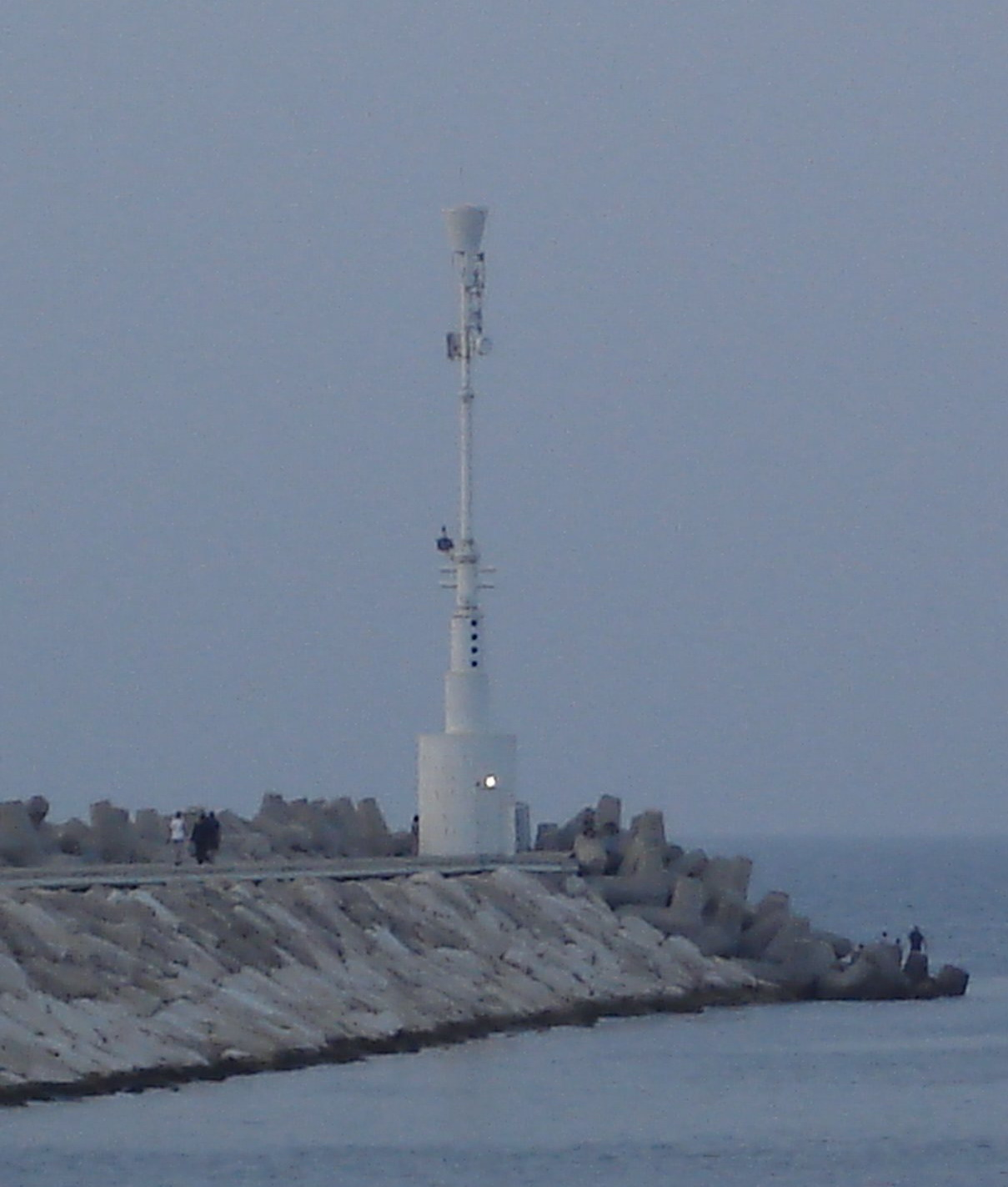
- Ashkelon Marina Breakwater Light
- Location: Ashkelon, Israel
- Coordinates: 31°41′6.93″N 34°33′22.04″E

Tower
- Foundation: 2-story cylindrical concrete base
- Construction: metal tower
- Height: 18 metres (59 ft)
- Shape: multistage cylindrical tower
- Markings: white tower

Light
- Focal height: 18 m (59 ft)
- Range: 7 nautical miles (13 km; 8 mi)
- Characteristic: Fl (2) G 5s.

Ashkelon Marina Breakwater Light is a lighthouse in Ashkelon, Israel. It is located at the end of the main breakwater of the Ashkelon Marina. The site is accessible by walking the pier, but the tower is closed to the public.

== See also ==
- List of lighthouses in Israel
