= Ashkelon Coal Jetty Breakwater Light =

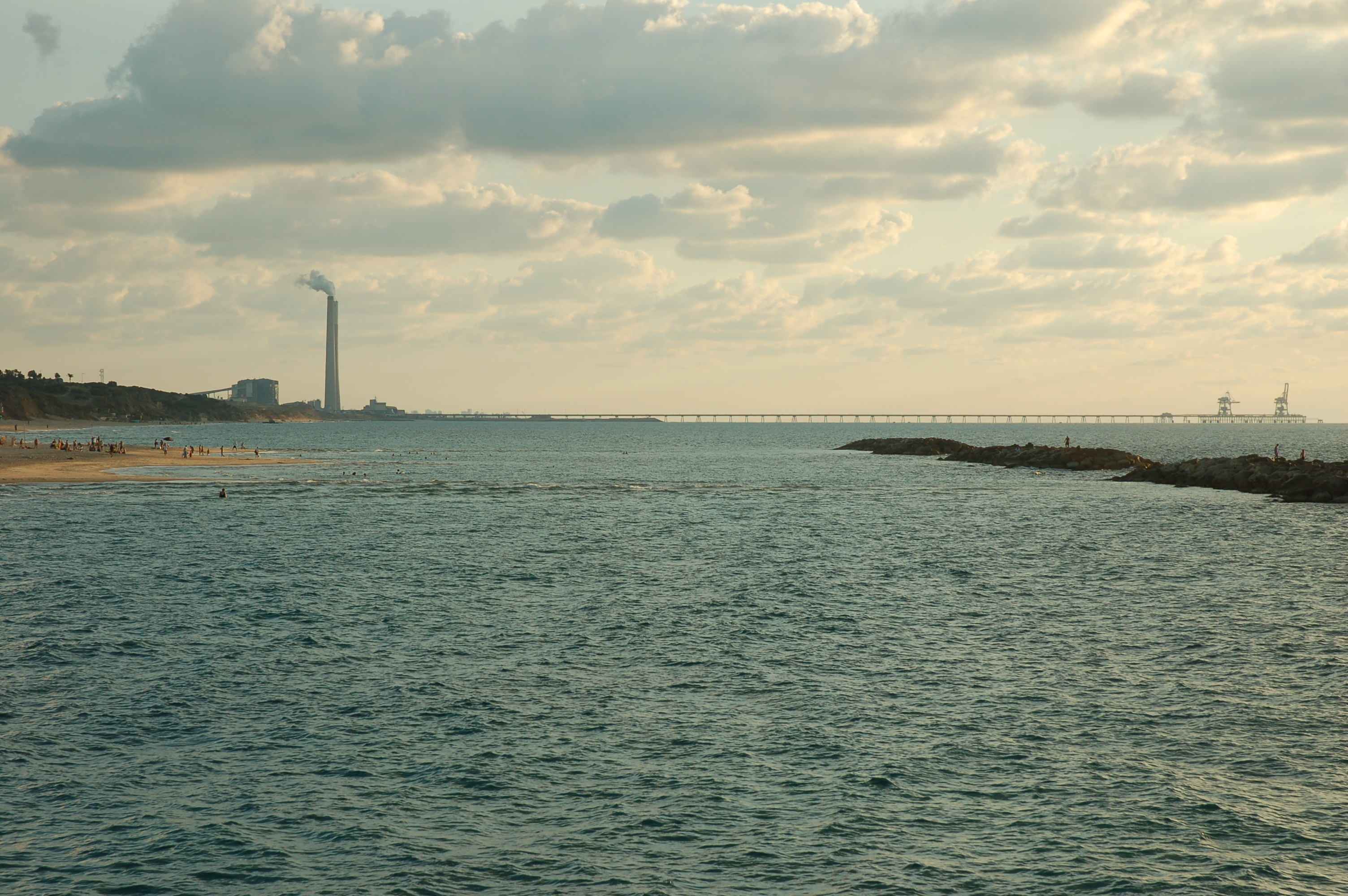
- Location: Ashkelon, Israel
- Coordinates: 31°38′25.68″N 34°31′11.88″E

Tower
- Construction: concrete tower
- Height: 18 metres (59 ft)
- Shape: multistage cylindrical tower with beacon
- Markings: unpainted gray concrete

Light
- Characteristic: Fl (2) G 6s.

Ashkelon Coal Jetty Breakwater Light is a lighthouse in Ashkelon, Israel. It is located at the end of the main breakwater of the Ashkelon Port Coal Jetty, in the Ashkelon Oil Port operated by the Eilat Ashkelon Pipeline Company, near the Trans-Israel pipeline.

The site is closed to the public.

== See also ==
- List of lighthouses in Israel
