= Israel Port Authority =

Israeli port operator

- רשות הספנות והנמלים (Hebrew)
- Authority emblem

Agency overview
- Formed: July 1, 1961; 65 years ago
- Jurisdiction: Government of Israel
- Headquarters: 15 Sderot HaPalyam, Haifa
- Parent agency: Ministry of Transport
- Website: www.israports.org.il

The Israel Ports Authority (Hebrew: רשות הספנות והנמלים) is the governmental agency which supervises and regulates the operation of Israel's seaports in Haifa, Ashdod and Eilat. It is headquartered in Haifa.

== History ==
The authority was set up on July 1, 1961, under the Ports Authority Law 5721-1961. On July 26, 1988, the Knesset approved an amendment to the Ports Authority Law, merging Israel Railways into the authority, henceforth to be known as the Israel Ports and Railways Authority. In 2002, Israel Railways was turned into a new state company and separated from the Ports Authority.

== Responsibilities ==
The duties are to plan, construct, develop, manage, maintain, and operate the ports. The Ports Authority law defines the Authority as a government corporation competent to acquire all rights, make all undertakings, and act as a litigant in all legal proceedings and a party to all contracts. It also stipulates that the Authority must run the ports as commercially viable enterprises and specifies those matters that require Government approval - development budgets, changes in tariffs, etc.

== Governance ==
The Ports Authority Council is appointed by the Government on recommendation of the Transport Minister. Of its 17 members, ten represent the public, and seven represent government ministries. Starting in 2011, former Mossad chief Meir Dagan became the Director of the Israel Port Authority. Dagan died of cancer on 17 March 2016 at the age of 71.

== IPA ports ==
The main seaports under the authority of the IPA, all three being both cargo and cruise ports, are:

- the Port of Haifa; on the Mediterranean (north)
- the Port of Ashdod; on the Mediterranean (south)
- the Port of Eilat; on the Red Sea.

The small Mediterranean ports of Hadera and Ashkelon are basically oil berths or terminals, with Hadera also serving as a coal berth for the two nearby power stations.

== Competition and privatization ==
In the beginning of the 21st century, the government of Israel instructed the Ports Authority to take steps aimed at increasing competition in the seaports field in the country. As part of this effort, Israel Shipyards was granted a permit to operate a small private port on its premises near the Port of Haifa, and the operation of each public port was handed to newly created state companies in hopes increasing competition between Ashdod and Haifa ports.

Unfortunately, not enough of the desired competitive outcome was achieved due to the oligopolistic market position, historical labor union obligations, and limited capacity of the two existing major ports. As a result of this situation, in the middle of the 2010s, the Ports Authority embarked on a NIS7.5 billion (appx. US$2 billion) investment program to construct large new shipping terminals at both Haifa and Ashdod ports and held a bid for private companies to operate the new terminals for a period of 25 years beginning in the year 2021. Shanghai International Port Group (SPIG) won the tender to operate the Bay Terminal in Haifa, while Switzerland-based Terminal Investment Limited (also known as the TiL Group, controlled by the privately held MSC Group) won the tender to operate the Southern Terminal in Ashdod once the terminals’ construction is complete.
