= Port of Acre =

Port on the coast of Israel

Coordinates: 32°55′10″N 35°04′11″E

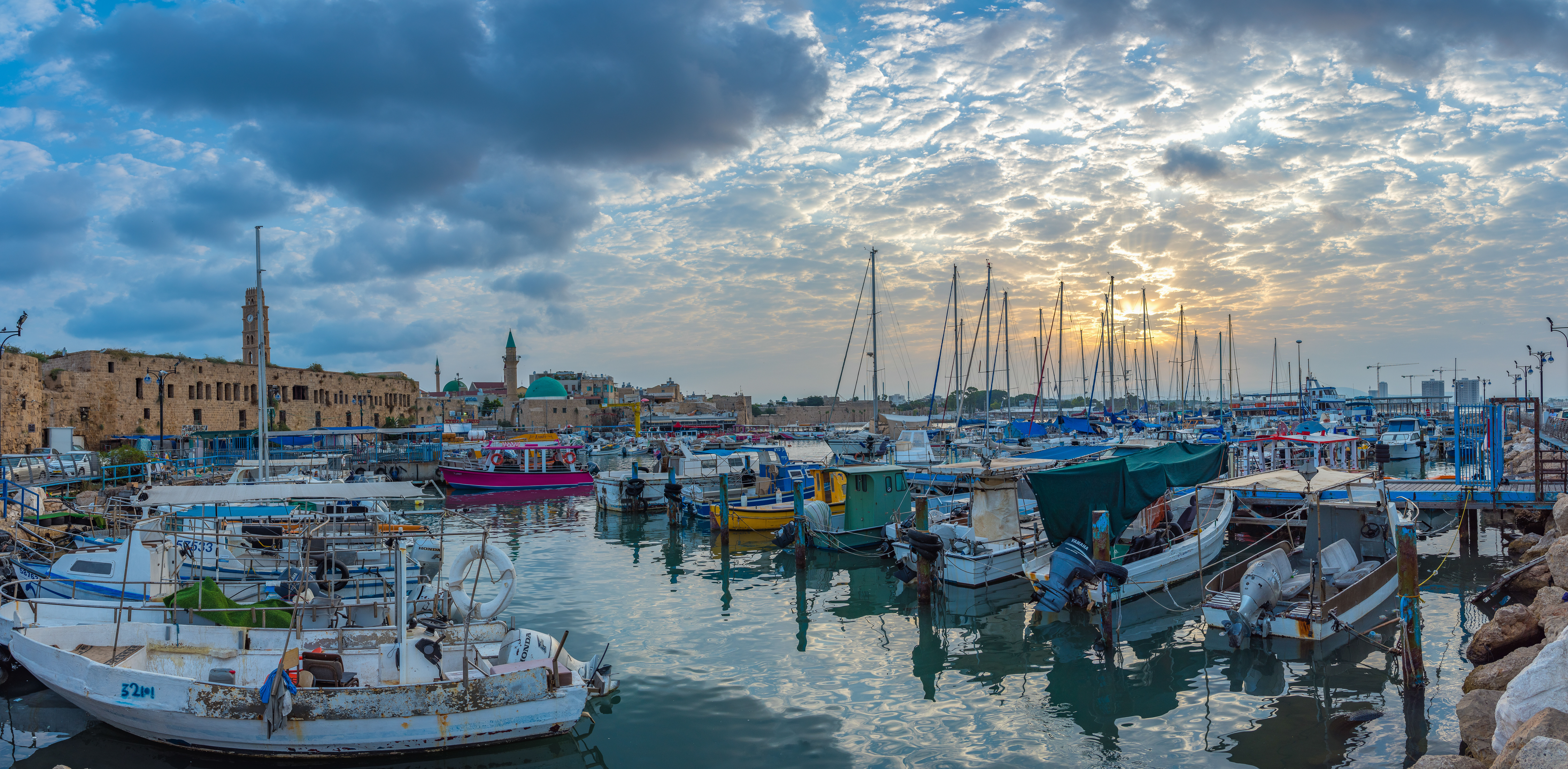
Port of Acre – historical phases and research stages

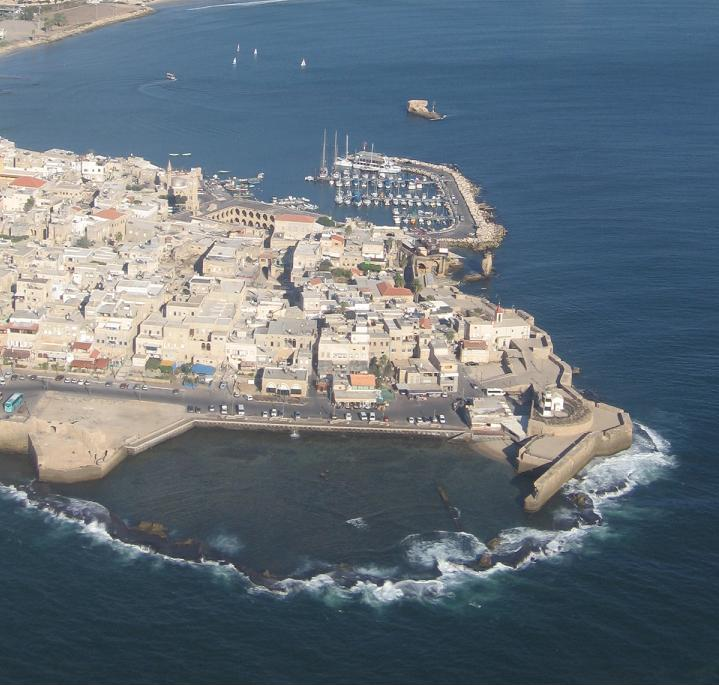
Aerial view of the Old City of Acre and its harbor. The Tower of Flies appears at the top of the image and the Pisan Port is to the right of the city, just below the breakwater

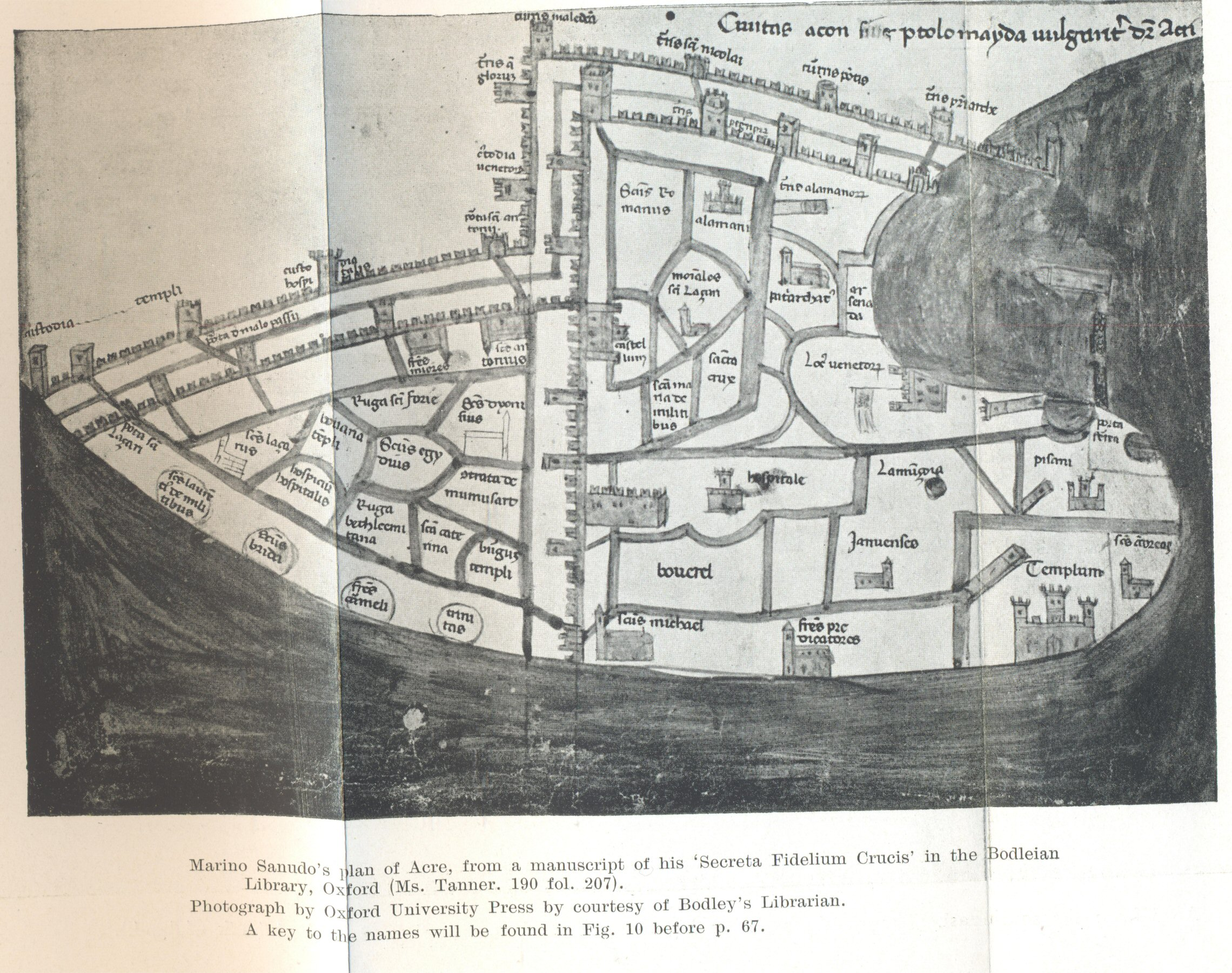
Map of Acre by the Venetian cartographer Marino Sanudo (1321), showing the southern breakwater and the eastern causeway (upper right)

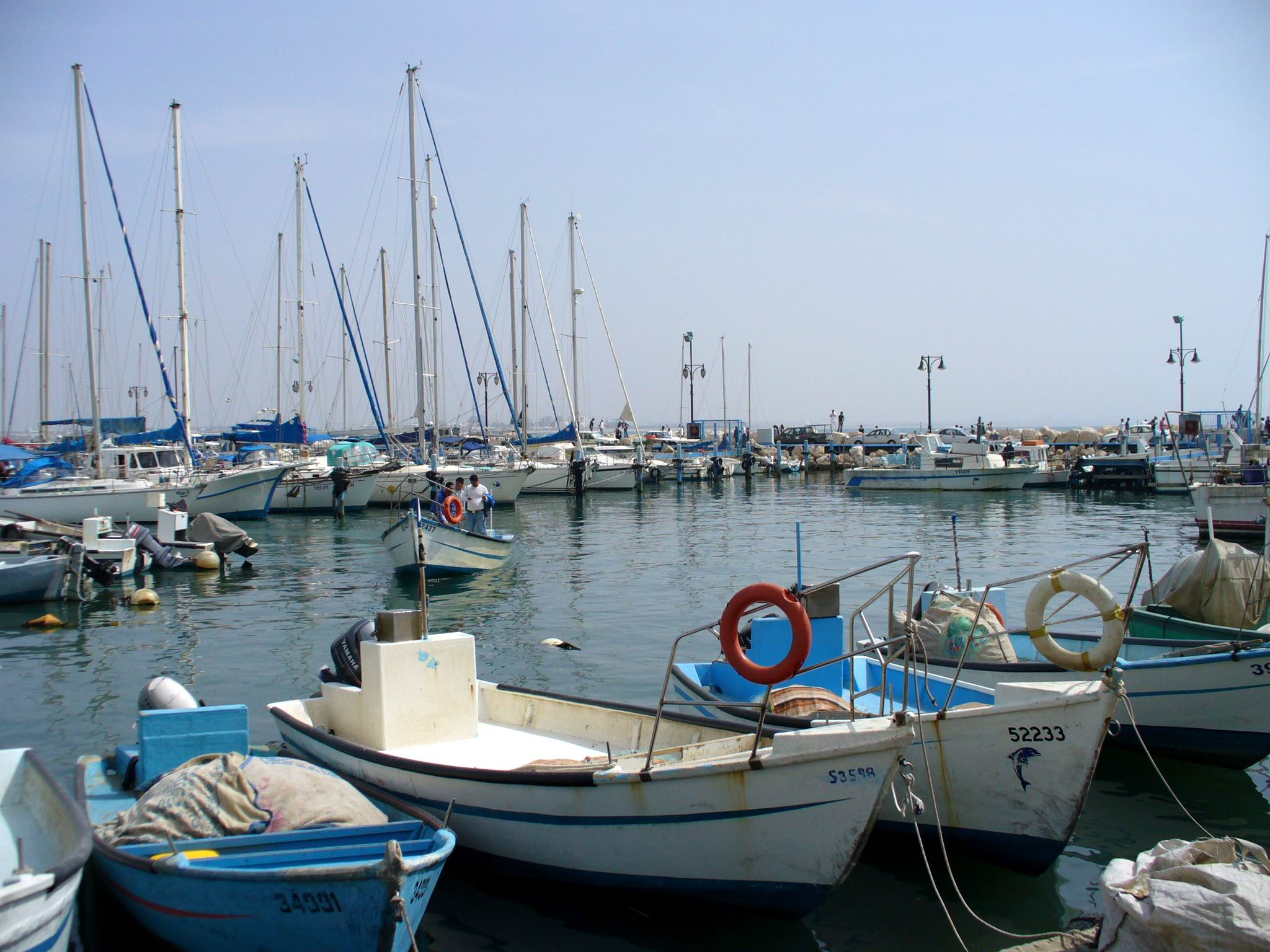
Boats in the harbor

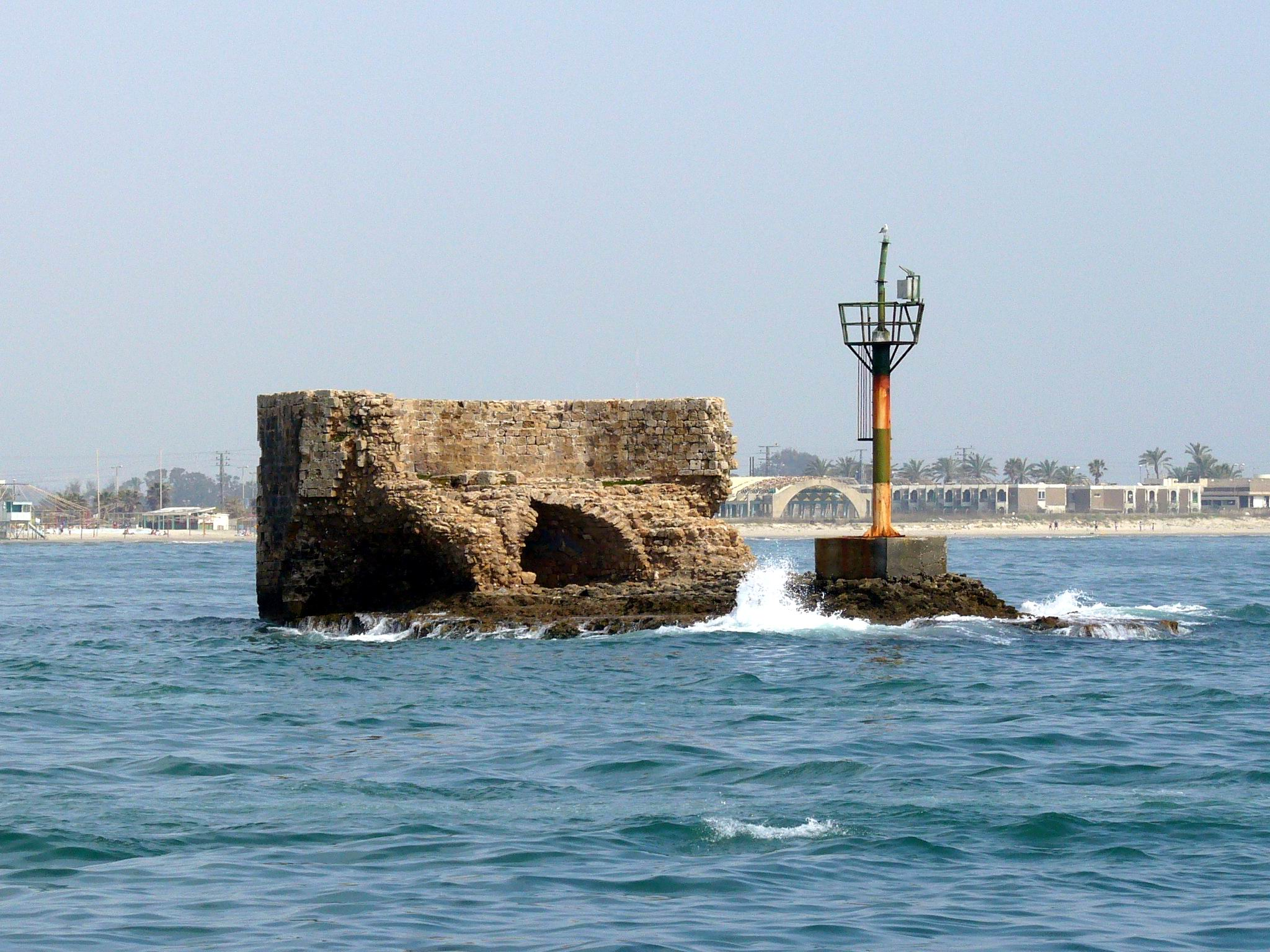
The Tower of Flies and the adjacent lighthouse

The Port of Acre (Hebrew: נמל עכו), is a marina and fishing harbor in Israel, located in the northern part of the Bay of Acre, at the southeastern corner of the Old City of Acre. The harbor was officially declared a marina in 1982 and is operated by the Old Acre Development Company via subcontractors. The marina includes five finger piers, while the area adjacent to the land quay primarily serves fishing boats.

== History ==
=== Antiquity ===
It is likely that the city's earliest harbor was located at the mouth of the Na'aman River, south of Tel Akko, where the urban settlement stood until the Hellenistic period. However, changes in the river's course and sedimentation make it difficult to locate archaeological remains supporting this assumption. Josephus noted that ships entered the river channel to load sand used in the glass industry. Acre is mentioned as a port city in a document from Ugarit dating to the 14th century BCE.

The harbor in its current location is first mentioned in a Phoenician inscription from the Persian period. The inscription, dated to the 5th or 6th century BCE, was found in the southern breakwater. Excavations indicate that the foundations of the breakwater were built using Phoenician construction techniques. Zenon, an official of the Ptolemaic dynasty, noted in a papyrus from 259 BCE that wheat was exported from the Port of Acre to Egypt.

Numerous finds dated to the 3rd century BCE and later attest to the growing importance of the harbor during the Hellenistic period, when Acre became the most important port city in the Land of Israel. Remains of a kurkar stone quay floor from this period were discovered near the eastern sea wall in early 2009. The exposed section measures 15 meters in length and 4 meters in width and lies approximately one meter below sea level, potentially providing information on the level of the Mediterranean Sea at the time of its construction. A large quantity of amphorae from the Aegean region was also discovered within the harbor area.

The harbor continued to develop during the Roman period. The remains of the southern breakwater date to this era; its eastern part lies beneath the modern breakwater, while the western remains are located in the so-called "Pisan Port." Despite the importance of the Port of Caesarea, Acre remained the primary port serving the Roman army during the First Jewish–Roman War. The harbor appears on a Roman coin from the 2nd century CE, depicting an arcade-like structure along the southern breakwater. Another coin shows a lighthouse, apparently located on the Island of the Flies. The number of amphorae from this period is approximately three times greater than those from the Hellenistic period, with the dominant group originating in North Africa.

=== Middle Ages ===
During the Byzantine period, the harbor deteriorated, and the southern breakwater was destroyed. The Caliph Mu'awiya I established a shipyard there, but it operated only briefly. In the second half of the 9th century, the governor of Egypt, Ahmad ibn Tulun, rebuilt the harbor and constructed the eastern causeway extending into the sea from the eastern land wall of Acre. This submerged causeway connected the Tower of Flies to the northern shore of the Bay of Acre, significantly enlarging the harbor area. It was likely built for defensive purposes and is clearly visible in aerial photographs, including those available on Google Earth.

The Crusaders captured Acre in 1104 after a siege by land and sea. During their rule, the Port of Acre reached the height of its historical importance, serving as the main maritime gateway between the Kingdom of Jerusalem and Europe. Commercial activity was concentrated in the western part of the harbor, near the quays of the Pisan and Venetian quarters. Contemporary accounts describe a chain guarding the harbor entrance. Despite its importance, the harbor could not accommodate the growing volume of maritime traffic, forcing some ships to anchor offshore.

Following the Mamluk conquest in 1291, the city and harbor were destroyed. Nevertheless, remains of a wooden pier dated to the 14th century indicate that the harbor continued to be used.

=== Modern era ===
The harbor regained importance in the mid-18th century when Daher el-Omar fortified Acre and initiated extensive construction projects. Its peak prosperity since the Crusader period occurred under Ahmad al-Jazzar. During Napoleon's siege in 1799, al-Jazzar defended the harbor entrance by scuttling a ship across it. In 1966, remains of a shipwreck measuring 34 meters in length and 5 meters in width were discovered, possibly the vessel sunk during Napoleon's siege.

In the 19th century, the harbor served the Egyptian fleet of Muhammad Ali and Ibrahim Pasha, but it was destroyed during the British bombardment of Acre in 1840. The harbor's final decline occurred in the 20th century when the British selected the Port of Haifa as the main maritime gateway of the Land of Israel. Since then, the Port of Acre has functioned primarily as a fishing harbor and leisure marina. The current breakwater was built in 1965 atop the ancient southern breakwater, and the harbor basin was dredged between 1993 and 1999.

In September 2023, journalist Moshe Gilad described the harbor as hosting approximately 50 fishing and tourist boats. A recent renovation added a raised concrete platform with sunbeds and wooden benches, while the Pisan Port became largely dominated by restaurants.

== Tower of the Flies ==
The Tower of the Flies is a fortified structure located on a small island near the harbor entrance. The shoal on which it stands served as a quay measuring approximately 60 by 12 meters from the Persian period onward. The tower was originally connected to the northern shore by a submerged causeway. The first tower was likely built in the Hellenistic period. In the 17th century, a mosque was constructed there, whose remains are still visible. A modern lighthouse stands nearby. The tower's name was given by the Crusaders, who mistakenly identified Acre with the Philistine city of Ekron and the structure as a temple of Beelzebub.

== Pisan Port ==
The Pisan Port is a rocky cove along the eastern section of Acre's southern sea wall. Despite its name, it was probably not a formal harbor due to shallow waters and exposure to southern and southwestern winds. It may have served small boats ferrying goods and passengers from ships anchored offshore, thereby avoiding harbor fees. The site is named after the Crusader-era Pisa quarter in which it is located.
