= Israeli National Maritime Museum =

Mosque in Haifa, Israel

- המוזיאון הימי הלאומי
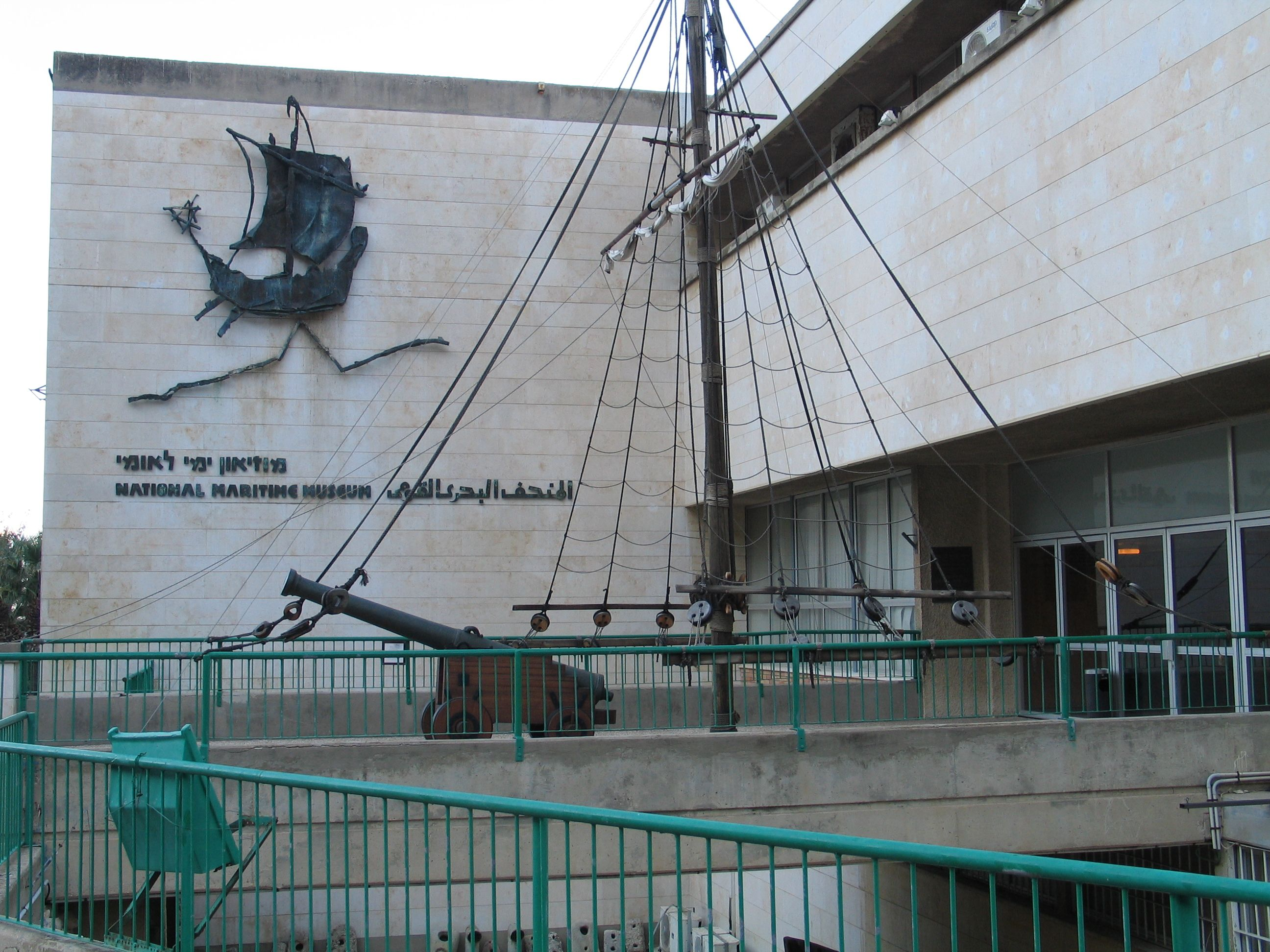
- Israeli National Maritime Museum
- Established: 1953
- Location: Haifa, Israel
- Coordinates: 32°49′44.2″N 34°58′20.29″E
- Type: Maritime museum, Archaeological museum
- Founder: Aryeh Ben-Eli
- Website: www.nmm.org.il/eng

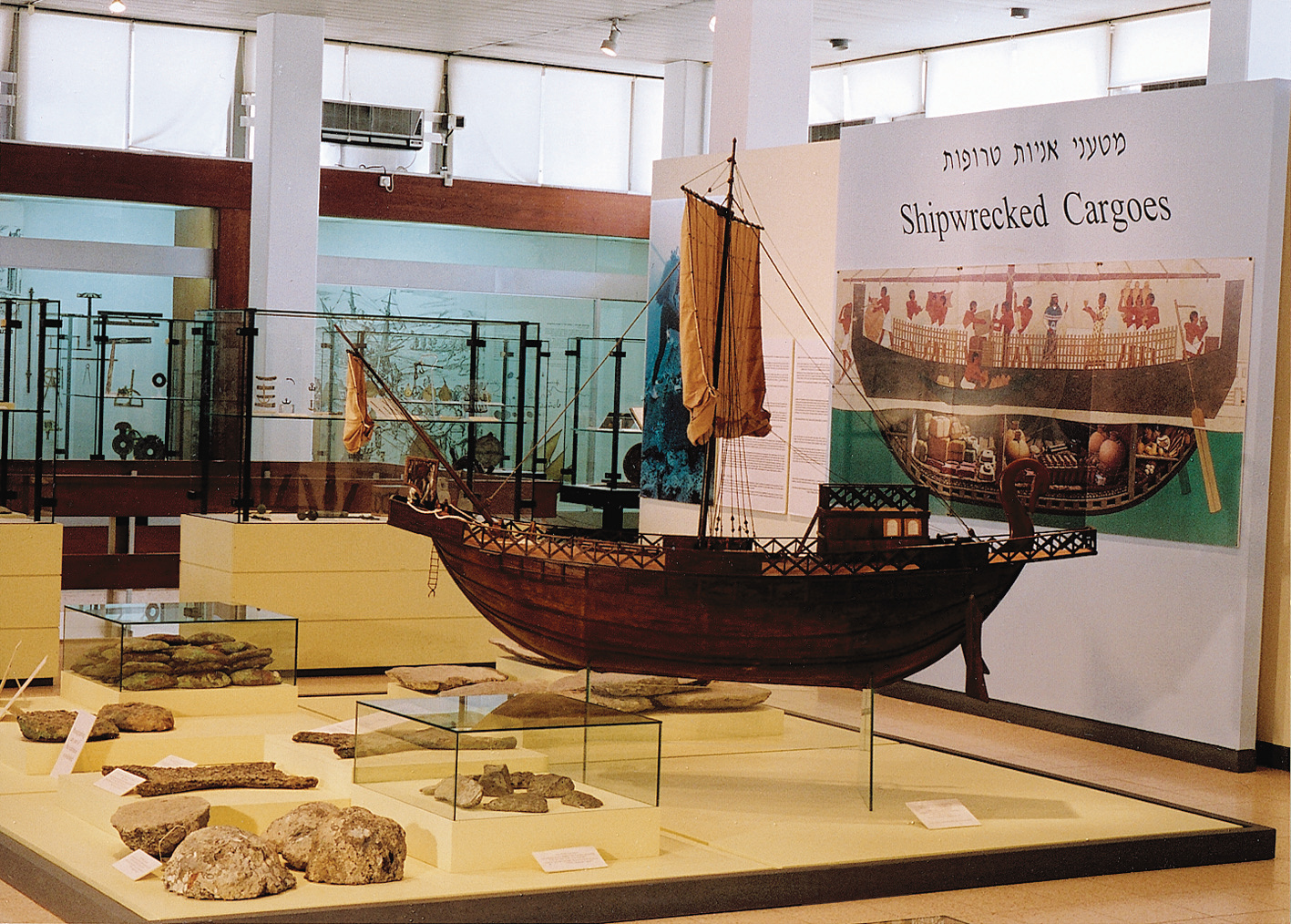
Shipwrecked cargo exhibit

The National Maritime Museum (Hebrew: המוזיאון הימי הלאומי, HaMuze'on HaYami HaLe'umi) is a maritime and archaeological museum in Haifa, Israel.

The museum was founded in 1953, based on the private collection of its founder and first director, Aryeh Ben-Eli. In 1972, the museum moved to its current premises near the northern beachhead of Mount Carmel, between Stella Maris and Bat Galim neighborhoods. Nearby are the Israeli Clandestine Immigration and Naval Museum and the Cave of Elijah.

The Marine Workshop of the Leon Recanati Institute for Maritime Studies, affiliated with the University of Haifa is located at the museum. The workshop provides professional diving and field surveying services for field research conducted at the institute.

Archaeological finds on permanent display at the museum include the Athlit Ram, a bronze ram of a 2nd-century BC warship.

== See also ==
- Lighthouses in Israel
- Tourism in Israel
