= Port of Haifa =

Port of Haifa נמל חיפה ميناء حيفا

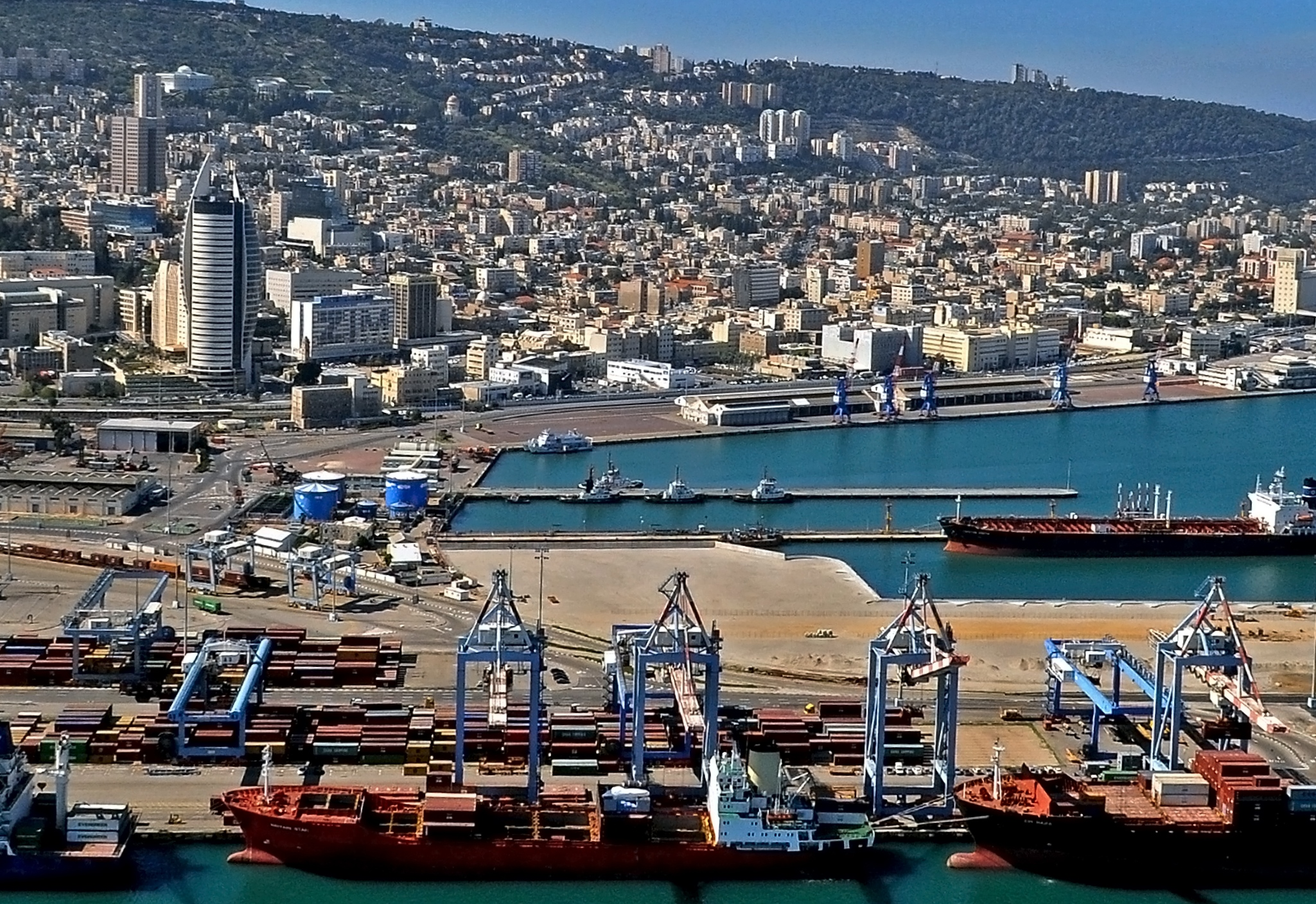
- The Port of Haifa
- Interactive map of Port of Haifa נמל חיפה ميناء حيفا

Location
- Country: Israel
- Location: Haifa
- Coordinates: 32°49′12″N 35°00′16″E
- UN/LOCODE: ILHFA

Details
- Opened: 1933; 93 years ago
- Operated by: Haifa Port Company, Ltd.
- Owned by: Adani Ports & SEZ; Gadot Group
- Water Depth: Channel 36 - 40 feet (11 - 12.2 meters), Cargo Pier 11 - 15 feet (3.4 - 4.6 meters), Oil Terminal 31 - 35 feet (9.4 - 10 meters)
- Anchorage: 36 - 40 feet (11 - 12.2 meters)

Statistics
- Annual cargo tonnage: 29.53 million tons (2018)
- Annual container volume: 1.46 million TEU (2018)
- Passenger traffic: 140,054 (2017)
- Website haifaport.co.il

The Port of Haifa (Hebrew: נָמֵל חֵיפָה, romanized: Nāmēl Ḥēyfāh; Arabic: حَيْفَا مِينَة, romanized: Mīnāʿ Ḥayfā) is the largest of Israel's three major international seaports, the others being the Port of Ashdod, and the Port of Eilat. Its natural deep-water harbor operates all year long and serves both passenger and merchant ships. It is one of the largest ports in the eastern Mediterranean in terms of freight volume and handles about 30 million tons of cargo per year (not including Israel Shipyards' port). The port employs over 1,000 people, rising to 5,000 when cruise ships dock in Haifa. The Port of Haifa lies north of Haifa's downtown quarter on the Mediterranean and stretches to some three kilometres along the city's central shore with activities ranging from military, industrial, and commercial next to a nowadays-smaller passenger cruising facility and Uri Michaeli Haifa International Airport.

== History ==
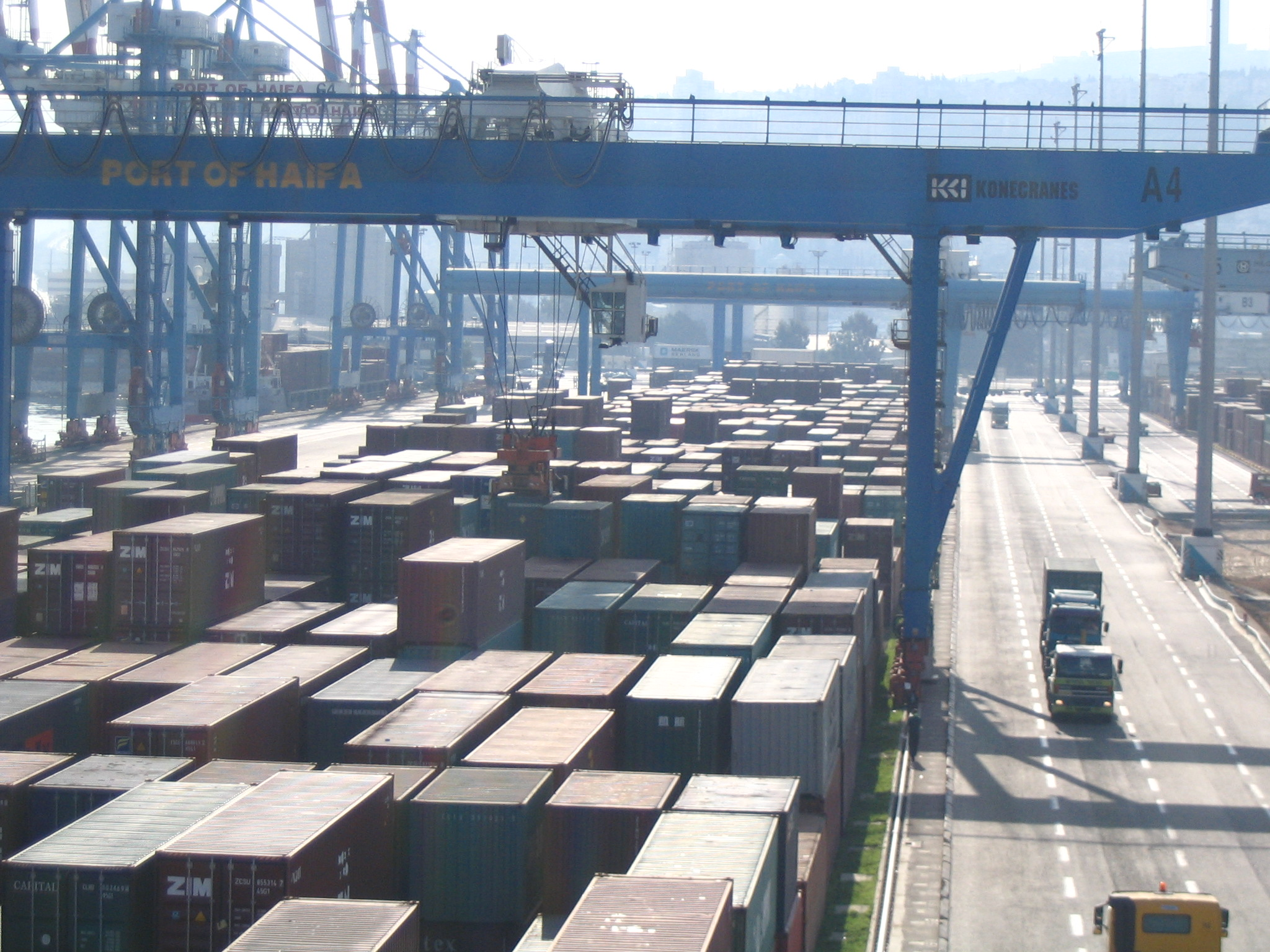
Containers in the Port of Haifa.

Haifa Bay has been a refuge for mariners since prehistoric times. When the Crusaders conquered Haifa in the year 1100, it became an important town and the main port for Tiberias, the capital of the Galilee. The port fell into disrepair during the Mamluk reign, and acquired the reputation of a pirate lair in the 18th century.

During the late Ottoman period, Haifa was one of the most important nodes in trade and social networks across the region, which encompassed major cosmopolitan centres like Damascus, Beirut, Aleppo, and Cairo. The city was increasingly folded into the growing capitalist economy of the world and it was a key player in regional markets.

Until the beginning of the 20th century, Acre served as the main port for the region. However, the port eventually became clogged with silt, and could not accommodate large ships. As coastal cities flourished and expanded after the British Mandate of Palestine, so did Haifa. Its population grew as a result of urbanisation, increased Jewish immigration, and the formation of Jewish settlements within the city.

The city's deep-water port was developed in this period, with construction beginning in 1922, and the port was officially opened on October 31, 1933, by Lt. Gen. Sir Arthur Wauchope, the British High Commissioner for Palestine. The port allowed Haifa to blossom, and in 1936, the city had over 100,000 inhabitants. The port was a gateway for thousands of immigrants to Israel after the Second World War. With Israel's western borders the Mediterranean and the eastern borders sealed by its Arab neighbors, Haifa served as a crucial gateway to the rest of the world, and helped Israel develop into an economic power. Today, the port brings both passenger and cargo traffic to a bustling metropolis.

The port has been the scene of two fatal sinkings. The Patria disaster in 1940 killed 267 people; the loss of Shelly in 2007 killed two.

In July 2022, the Israeli government announced that the Haifa port had been sold to winning bidders Adani Ports & SEZ and local chemicals and logistics group Gadot for 4.1 billion shekels (US$1.2 billion). The sale does not include the new Bay Terminal completed in 2021 which is situated across the harbor from the existing shipping terminals.

== Facilities ==
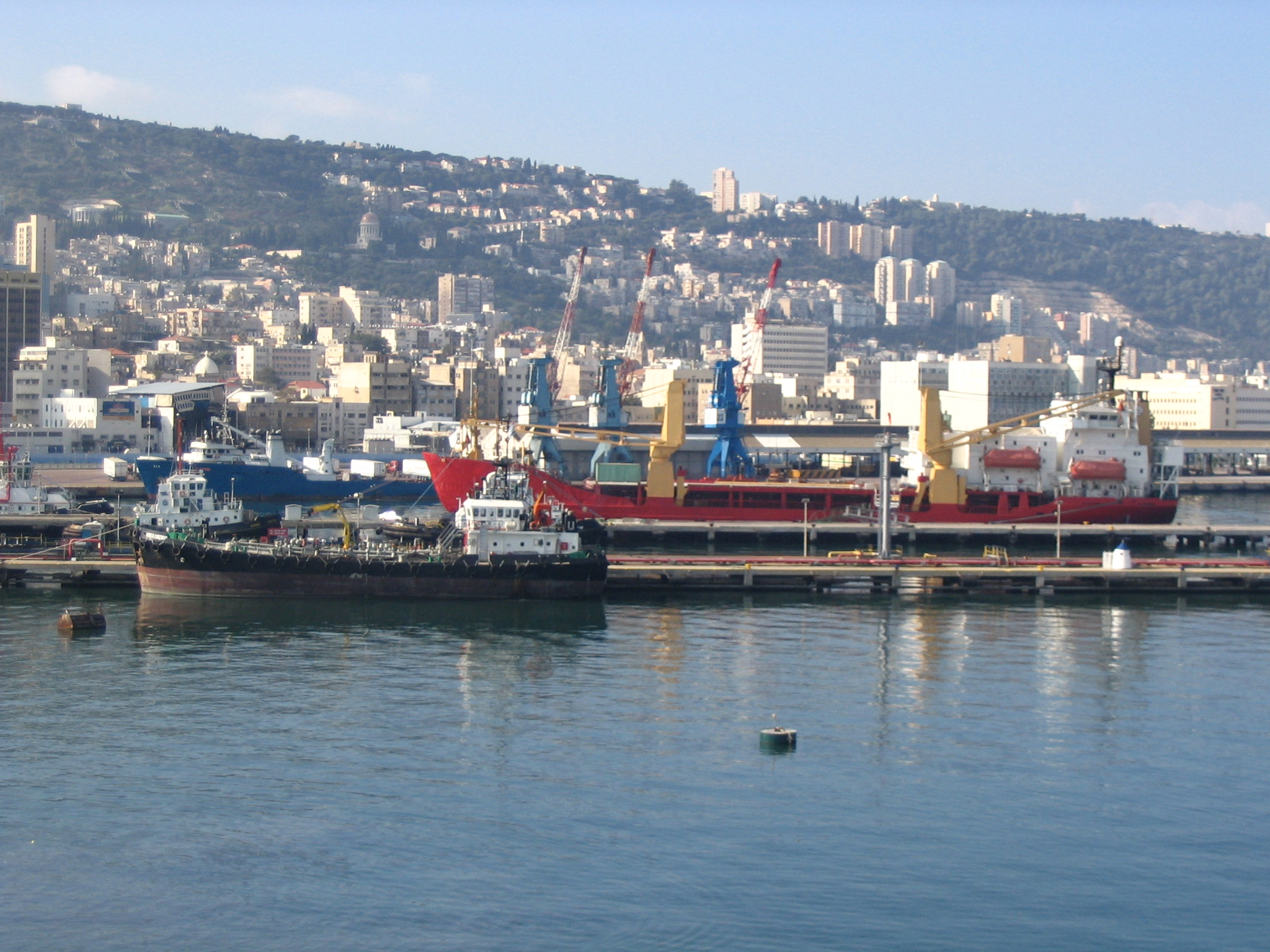
Port of Haifa, viewed from the harbor.

The Port of Haifa contains many cargo terminals, and is capable of servicing many ships at once. A modern 17-lane truck gate facility can handle multiple cargo vehicles exiting the port simultaneously. A railroad freight terminal is located inside the port that in 2018 handled transporting about 221,000 containers to and from the port by rail, in addition to general cargo. The port also features a passenger terminal, fishing wharf, yacht club, sports marina, large grain silos, and a chemicals terminal. In 2018, the port processed nearly 30 million tons of cargo including 1.46 million TEUs, as well as 240,000 passengers.

The port opened the first phase in the "Carmel Port" expansion program in 2010 that involved the construction of a new cargo terminal which includes a 700m long wharf capable of handling 15,500 TEU container ships with a maximum draft of 15.2m, as well as the opening of a secondary 250 metres (820 ft) wharf plus adjacent support and storage areas. The new facilities expand the port's annual container handling capacity by 500,000 TEU. Construction of this new terminal cost NIS1.8 billion (appx. US$500 million) and took five years to complete.

The Port maintains facilities for the United States Sixth Fleet.

=== Israel Shipyards port ===
Israel Shipyards, near the port, provides heavy ship repair facilities. The company also operates a private port on its premises which in 2017 handled approximately three million tons of cargo, consisting of mostly bulk and general cargo.

=== Passenger terminal ===
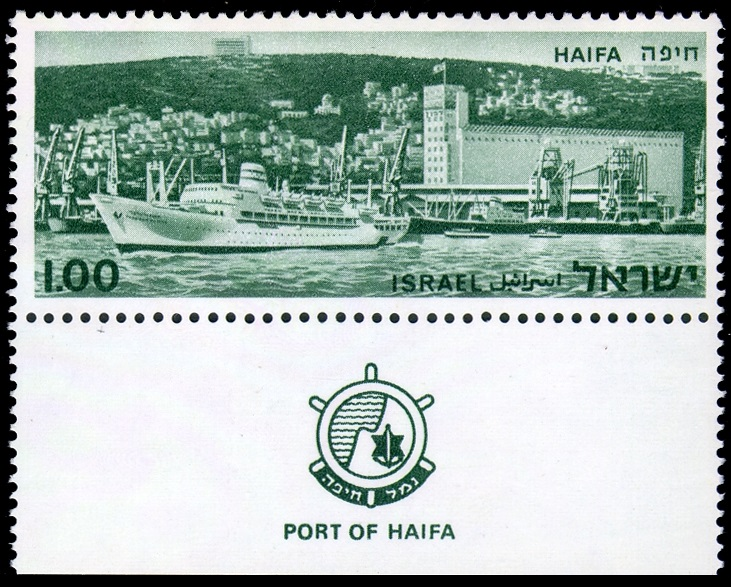
Israeli postage stamp depicting the Port of Haifa

The port contains a modern passenger terminal serving cruise and ferry passengers. The terminal offers a waiting area, duty-free shop, souvenir shop, cafeteria, VAT reimbursement counter, currency exchange, free wireless internet, parking, as well as other services to travelers.

The area near the terminal also offers excellent public transit connections for passengers. The Haifa Center Railway Station is adjacent to the terminal and is served by nearly 200 passenger trains 24 hours a day on weekdays to the Haifa region and beyond. Additional public transit connections are available by bus or taxi at the railway station or on Ha'Atsma'ut Road, the main thoroughfare in downtown Haifa which is located in front of the station. The Carmelit's Kikar Paris subway station is also within walking distance and allows convenient access to the top of Mount Carmel.

== Expansion ==
As of 2018, the Israel Port Authority is managing the construction of the first phase of a major expansion of the port at a cost of NIS 4 billion (approximately US$1.1 billion). The plan involves the following:

- Extensive reclamation of an area northeast of the mouth of the Kishon River which will enable the construction of a large new terminal to be named the "Bay Terminal" that will be capable of handling giant container ships carrying more than 15,000 TEUs each.
- Extension of the main breakwater by 880 metres and construction of a new secondary breakwater.
- A new fuels terminal, replacing the existing one which dates back to the 1940s.
- Expansion of the existing chemicals terminal.
- A dedicated freight railway terminal on the grounds of the new shipping terminal, as well as connecting the adjacent Israel Shipyards facilities to the rail network.

The new container terminal was built by the Israeli construction firms Ashtrom and Shapir Marine & Civil Engineering and officially inaugurated on 1 September 2021. Shanghai International Port Group (SIPG) won an international tender to operate the new terminal for a period of 25 years on completion.

In its initial phase the Bay Terminal will be capable of handling 800,000 TEU container movements annually and planned future expansions to the terminal could handle up to an additional 700,000 TEU.

== See also ==
- Gilla Gerzon (Information on Haifa USO)
- List of seaports
- Cargo ship
- Shipping
- Israel Port Authority
