= Port of Eilat =

Port in Israel

Port of Eilat נמל אילת
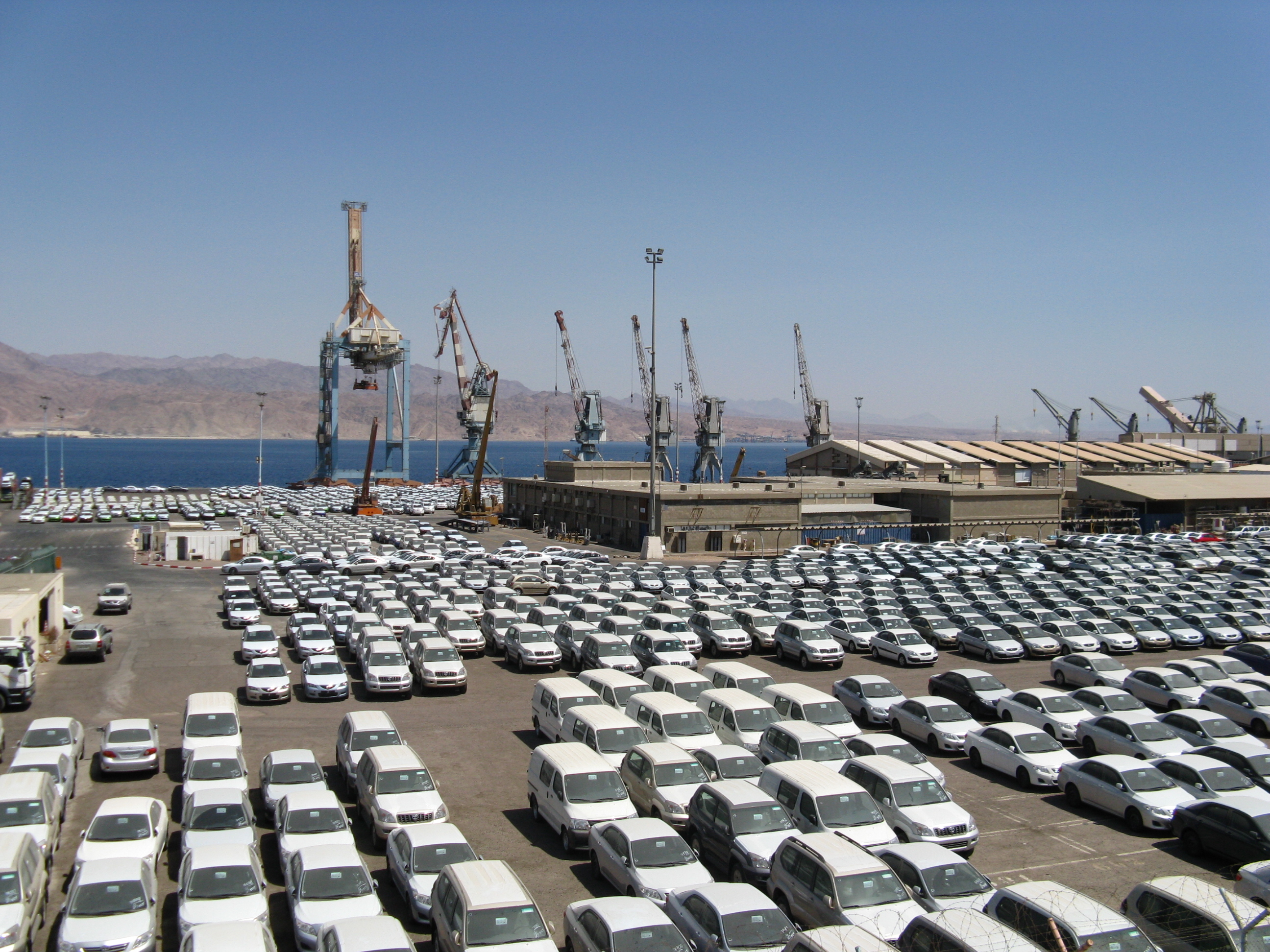
- The Port of Eilat
- Interactive map of Port of Eilat נמל אילת

Location
- Country: Israel
- Location: Eilat
- Coordinates: 29°31′56.07″N 34°56′25.54″E
- UN/LOCODE: ILEIL

Details
- Opened: 1952
- Closed: July 2025 (following a blockade by the Houthi)
- Operated by: Jordache Enterprises Inc. via Papo Maritime Ltd
- Owned by: Israel Port Authority

Statistics
- Annual cargo tonnage: 2.6 million tons (2012)
- Website eilatport.co.il

The Port of Eilat (Hebrew: נמל אילת) is an Israeli port on the Red Sea, long Israel's only port to the south. Eilat is located at the northern tip of the Gulf of Aqaba. This strategic location has given it outsized importance despite being remote from the country's main population centers, and access to the port has played a key role in Arab-Israeli conflicts. The port shut down in July 2025 following a blockade by the Houthi movement.

== History ==
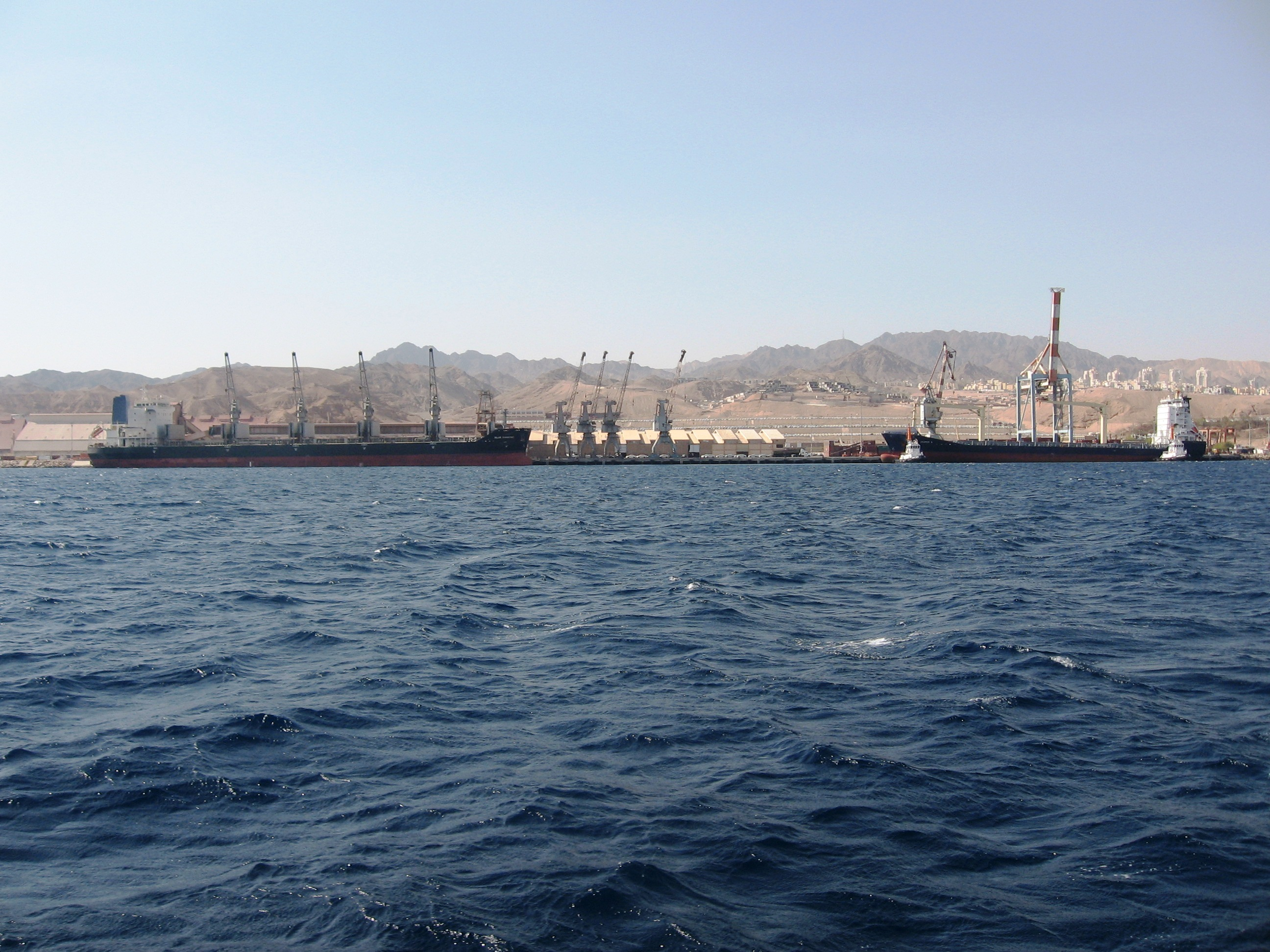
Port of Eilat seen from the sea

The Port of Eilat was declared in 1952, and constructed between 1952 and 1956. It was opened for cargo traffic in 1957 and it was designed to serve as the southern gateway to Israel for shipments from East Africa, Asia and the Far East, as it allows Israeli shipping to reach the Indian Ocean without having to sail through the Suez Canal. Since it was opened, a major user of the port is Dead Sea Works and its parent ICL Group Ltd., which exports minerals from the Dead Sea, mainly potash to India, China and the Far East, using a dedicated wharf at the port.

Egyptian naval blockades of the Straits of Tiran which control access to Eilat featured prominently in the events which led to two major Arab-Israeli conflicts: the Suez Crisis and the Six-Day War.

Thereafter until the Iranian Revolution, oil was imported through the Eilat-Ashkelon pipeline.

In the 1980s, the port handled up to 40,000 containers a year, but the business waned until it was eliminated altogether in 2007, when Zim Integrated Shipping Services stopped visiting the port, preferring to ship containers directly to Israel's Mediterranean ports.

Until the late 1990s, importers of goods from the Far East were required by the Israeli government to ship them into the country via the port of Eilat (In order to ensure there is sufficient traffic through the Port). Afterwards this requirement was dropped, and the scope of activity at the port of Eilat shrunk by about 40 percent. Since then the ship traffic at Eilat remained relatively low (compared to Israel's two large seaports on the Mediterranean). One reason is that Eilat is situated at a considerable distance from the center of the country. Another is the fact that unlike the country's other main seaports, Eilat's is yet to be served by a railway line (the nearest railhead is located over a hundred kilometers to the north at Dimona). Also, coastal tourism uses compete with any prospects of expanding the port's facilities. For many years, in order to keep the port viable, vehicle importers to Israel from Japan and the Far East were forced to use the port, and ship them north using Car carrier trailer.

Patrol Boats Squadron 915 of the Israeli Navy is based a section of the port.

=== Privatization ===
In 2003, Minister of Finance Benjamin Netanyahu, started the process of privatizing the port. Initially it was separated from the state owned Israel Port Authority into a separate limited company (which was still owned by the state). However the process was stalled, due to plans to move the Israeli Navy base and objection from employees. The Privatization process restarted in December 2010, following approval by the ministerial privatization committee. But in July 2012, after ICL Group (Israel Chemicals) was the only bidder left in the privatization tender for the port, the tender was deferred. Later ICL Group also dropped its bid.

In November 2012, "Papo Maritime", subsidiary of Jordache Enterprises Inc. owned by the Nakash Brothers, agreed to pay the Israeli government NIS 120 million for the franchise to operate the port for 15 years, after bidding NIS 100.5 million initially and improving on the offer twice.

In 2014 the port started again handling shipping containers after many years, using a small feeder ship with a capacity of 124 containers that are transported to the Port of Aqaba, in Jordan for transshipment into bigger vessels. "Papo Maritime" also bought two mobile cranes for loading and unloading containers. This was done under the terms of the contract with the government, where "Papo Maritime" promised to meet a target of handling an annual average of 80,000 TEU of containers.

=== Impact of Red Sea crisis ===
In October 2023, Ansar Allah, known widely as the Houthi movement, fired missiles and drones targeting international interests in the Red Sea. They were generally aimed at ships from all countries sailing through the Red Sea. The missiles and drones were intercepted with no casualties recorded. The strikes were followed by further attacks on shipping in the Red Sea. Ships headed to the port of Eilat were among the ships targeted by the Houthis. All container shipping through the Red Sea dropped by approximately 90 percent from December to the middle of February due to the Houthi attacks. In December, it was reported by the CEO of the Eilat port that following the Houthi attacks, shipping activity to the port had dropped by 85%.

In March 2024, the port operator announced plans to lay off half its staff, due to Houthi attacks stymieing shipping trade to the port.

On 7 July 2024, the port's CEO told the Knesset Economic Affairs Committee that there had been no activity at the port in the past eight months, and he was requesting financial assistance. Later the CEO said "It must be acknowledged that the port is in a state of bankruptcy".

On 17 July 2025, the port's bank accounts were frozen due to unpaid taxes. The port completely shut down on 20 July 2025.

== Development plans ==
To alleviate the limitations imposed on the port's development, the government has proposed the "Southern Gateway" plan for the area. This proposal entails the construction of a massive combined air-rail-sea logistical center to be located in the desert north of the city. The details of this proposal include: relocating the current port to an excavated area north of the city, reachable by a 70 m (230 ft)-wide, 7.5 km (4.7 mi)-long canal built alongside the Jordanian border from the Gulf of Aqaba, the construction of a new international airport within the vicinity (finished in 2019), and the extension of the railway from the Nahal Zin railhead to the port and airport. International investors such as the South African Harris Group of Companies, and Chinese government have expressed interest in the project. The vision is to provide an alternative route to the Suez Canal.

The relocation of the port will free up a considerable amount of coastline on the gulf for redevelopment for tourism purposes and connection of the port to Israel Railways' network would ensure a significant increase in the amount of cargo traffic passing through the port. The railway would also help boost tourism which took a hit with the shutdown of Eilat Airport and Sde Dov Airport in 2019, making domestic travel to Eilat more time-consuming and cumbersome.

In January 2012, the Minister of Transportation instructed the Israel Port Authority to begin a preliminary survey of the land to determine the optimal location of an excavated port north of Eilat.

== Environmental protection ==
Due to environmental concerns, the Eilat Port Authority spent millions to build a loader that prevents phosphate dust from dispersing into the sea.

== See also ==
- Eilat Airport
- Ovda International Airport
- Taba Border Crossing
- Ramon Airport
- Yotvata Airfield
- Israel port authority

== Biography ==
- Hakim, A.A. (1979). "IV: Legal status of the Gulf of Aqaba and the Straits of Tiran and the rules governing the right of passage therethrough". The Middle Eastern States and the Law of the Sea. Contemporary issues in the Middle East. Manchester University Press. pp. 132–177. ISBN 978-0-7190-0711-8.

Preceded by The Guitar Hotel (United States) Hollywood, FL	Miss Universe venue 2021	Succeeded by Ernest N. Morial Convention Center (United States) New Orleans, LA
