= Port of Ashdod =

Port in Israel

Ashdod Port נמל אשדוד

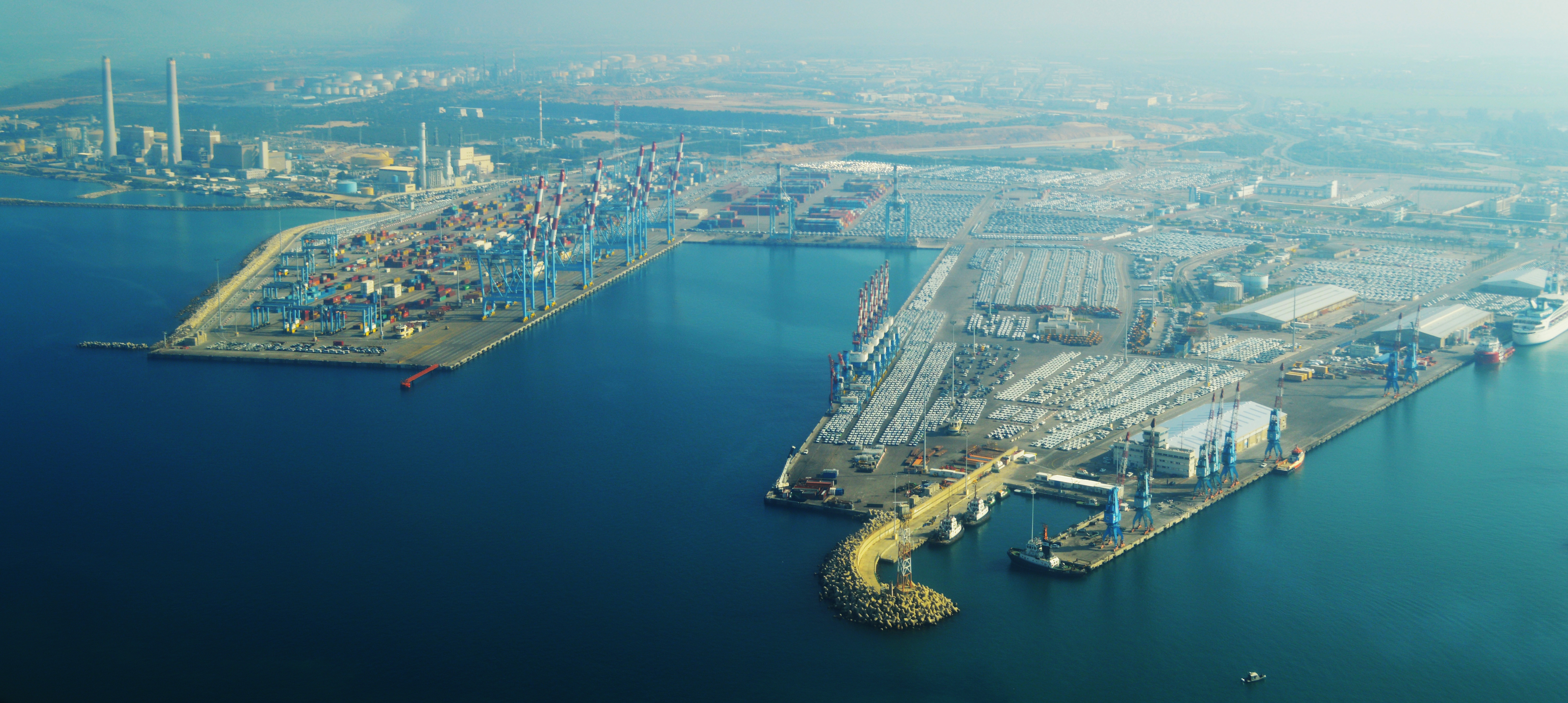
- Ashdod Port
- Interactive map of Ashdod Port נמל אשדוד

Location
- Country: Israel
- Location: Derech Petach Tikva 74, Ashdod
- Coordinates: 31°49′26.03″N 34°38′49.57″E
- UN/LOCODE: IL ASH

Details
- Opened: 1965
- Operated by: Israel Port Authority
- Owned by: Government of Israel
- Type of Harbor: Artificial Seaport
- No. of piers: 12
- Water Depth: Channel 46 - 50 feet (14 - 15.2 meters), Cargo Pier 16 - 20 feet (4.9 - 6.1 meters)
- Port Services: Electrical Repair, Navigation Eq, Garbage Disposal, Dirty Ballast
- Anchorage: 76 feet – (OVER 23.2m)

Statistics
- Annual cargo tonnage: 23.6 million tons (2017)
- Annual container volume: 1.525 million TEU (2017)
- Passenger traffic: 26,757 (2017)
- Annual revenue: ₪1,114 million
- Website ashdodport.co.il

The Port of Ashdod (Hebrew: נמל אשדוד) is one of Israel's three main cargo ports. The port is located in Ashdod, about 40 kilometers south of Tel Aviv, adjoining the mouth of the Lachish River.

It was built in the 1960s and opened in November 1965 with the arrival of the Swedish vessel Vingaland which brought a shipment of sugar from Warsaw.

Its establishment significantly enhanced the country's port capacity. It handles the largest volume of cargo containers annually (1.525 million TEU in 2017) of all Israeli ports. Cargo also arrives at the port for Egypt, Jordan and the Palestinian authority as well as ships carrying humanitarian aid for the Gaza Strip also unload their cargo at Ashdod.

== History ==
Tel Mor served as a port for Philistine Kingdom of Ashdod during the Late Bronze Age. When Ashdod was destroyed in the 10th century BCE it was not rebuilt.

After Ashdod rebelled against Sargon II, the King of Assyria in 717 BCE he destroyed it and built a fortified city called Ashdod-Yam together with a harbor.

== Modern Port ==
Ashdod is one of six commercial ports operating in Israel, in addition to Haifa, the Bay Port, Israel Shipyards Port, the South Port and the Port of Eilat. It is the only port that is run by a governmental company, the Ashdod Port Company Ltd.

In March 2004 a double suicide bombing killed ten people and injured sixteen when two Hamas suicide bombers from the Jabalya refugee camp in Gaza detonated bombs in the port.

== See also ==
- Ashdod Port attack
- List of seaports
- Cargo ship
- Shipping
- Israel Port Authority
