= Transport in Petah Tikva =

Transport in Israeli city of Petah Tikva

Petah Tikva is a city in the Central District of Israel.

== Roads ==
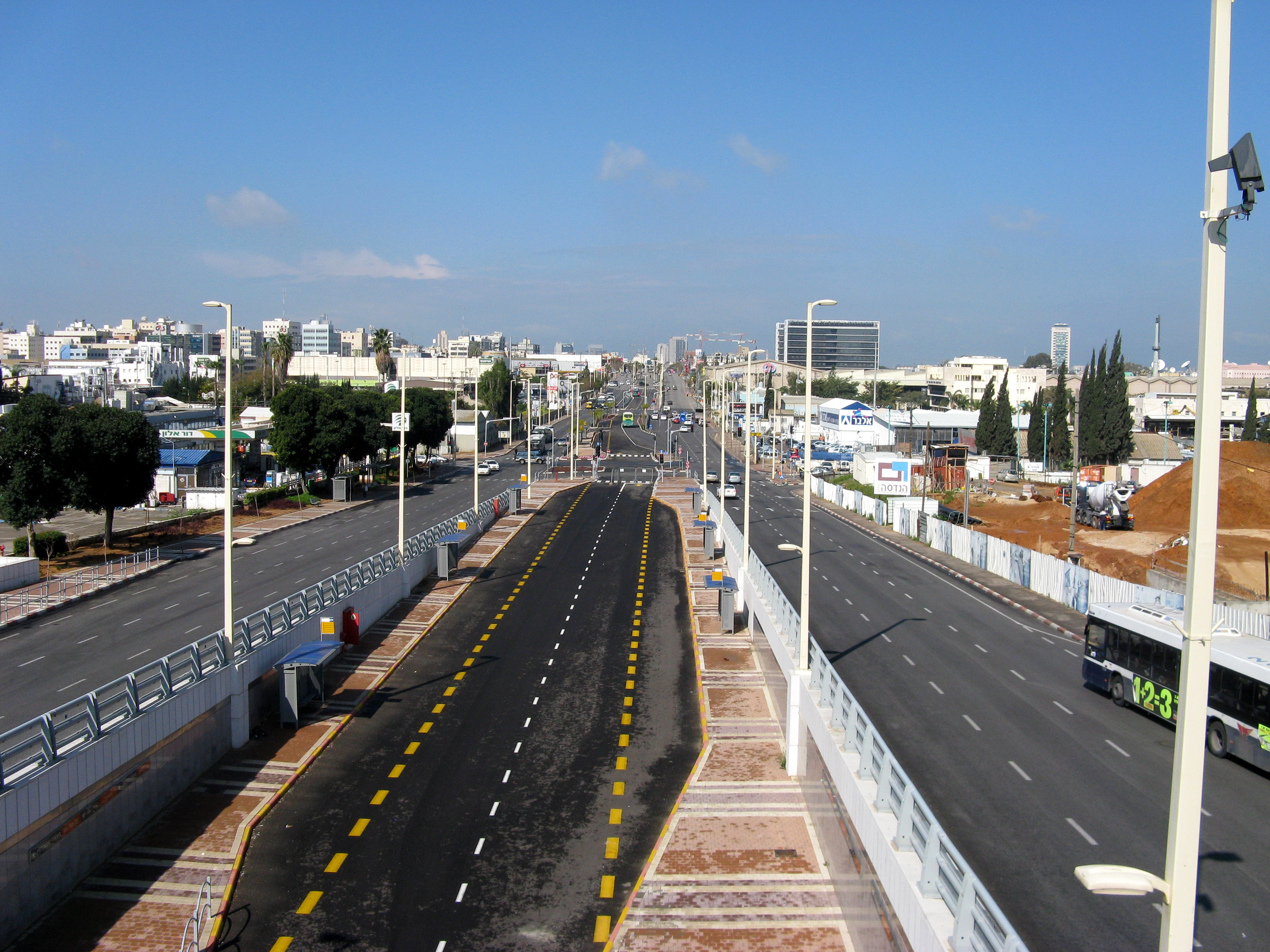
The old bus lane on Jabotinsky Road through which a light rail now passes, Petah Tikva (view from the Calatrava bridge)

Petah Tikva is enclosed by four highways - Geha Highway, Highway 5, Highway 40 and Maccabit Road (Highway 471, which opened in November 2007). Highways 4 and 5 are freeways within Petah Tikva. Road 483 connects Petah Tikva and nearby Rosh HaAyin, and Road 4713 connects it with Kfar Sirkin.

Another major road and perhaps the main transportation artery of the city is Jabotinsky Road (Road 481), which connects Petah Tikva with Bnei Brak, Ramat Gan and Tel Aviv. It is one of the busiest roads in Israel and the Tel Aviv Subway is expected to go through its length.

== Railways ==
Petah Tikva has two railway stations – the Segula station, which is located near the Yarkon Interchange and is separated from the rest of the city, and the Kiryat Aryeh station. Both stations are near industrial zones and mainly serve commuters from other towns who work in Petah Tikva, not Petah Tikva's own population.

A railway station existed in a more central area in Petah Tikva in the past, on the former Tel Aviv – Petah Tikva line. Citing the success of the Be'er Sheva Center Railway Station spur, a plan for a train station near the central bus station of Petah Tikva was included in the Israel Railways secondary expansion plan (post-2013). However, it was frozen due to local opposition.

== Light rail ==
The Tel Aviv Light Rail Red Line passes through Petah Tikva as a ground-level light rail system, which became operational on August 18, 2023. It passes through Jabotinsky and Orlov streets and works to expand the streets and create public transportation lanes started in 2005, and work on the first station of the light rail next to the Beilinson Hospital started in 2009.

The Red Line depot is also located in Petah Tikva, next to the Kiryat Aryeh Business Park.

== Buses ==
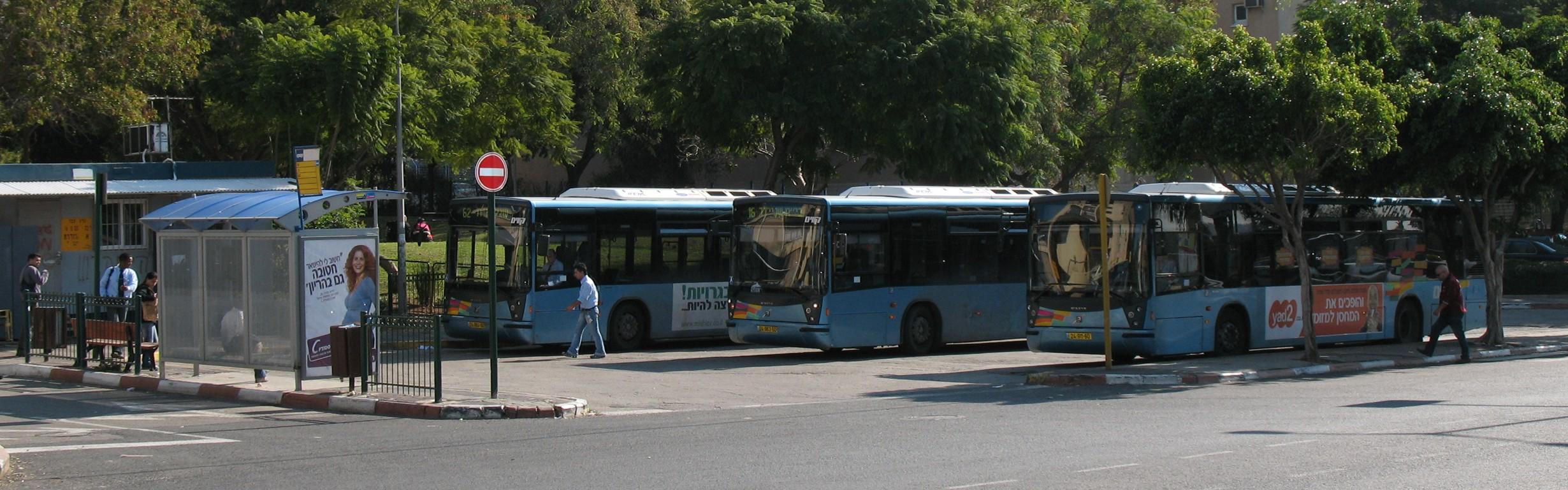
Kavim buses waiting at the Kaplan Terminal near the Beilinson Hospital

A number of bus companies operate throughout the city, with numerous terminals. The Egged Bus Cooperative handles inter-city lines, the Dan Bus Company is responsible for lines from Petah Tikva to other cities in the Gush Dan area as well as to the West Bank (but not lines within Petah Tikva), while Afikim handles lines within the city.

The transfer of internal lines from Dan to Kavim was made in April 2006 amid severe opposition from Petah Tikva's residents. In 2016, the lines were transferred again from Kavim to Afikim.

The main bus terminal in Petah Tikva is the central bus station. Other terminals include the Sirkin Terminal, Beit Rivka, the Kaplan/Beilinson Terminal and the nearby mall, which is also a large transport hub. The main junctions of the city which serve as major inter-city bus stops are Segula Junction (roads 40/481), Ganim Junction (roads 40/483), Sirkin Junction (roads 40/4713) and Geha Interchange (roads 4/481).

In August 2009, Petah Tikva became the first city in Israel to deploy electronic signs on regular bus stations throughout the city. Six such stations were set up in the pilot run, and 50 are slated eventually.

=== Petah Tikva Central Bus Station ===
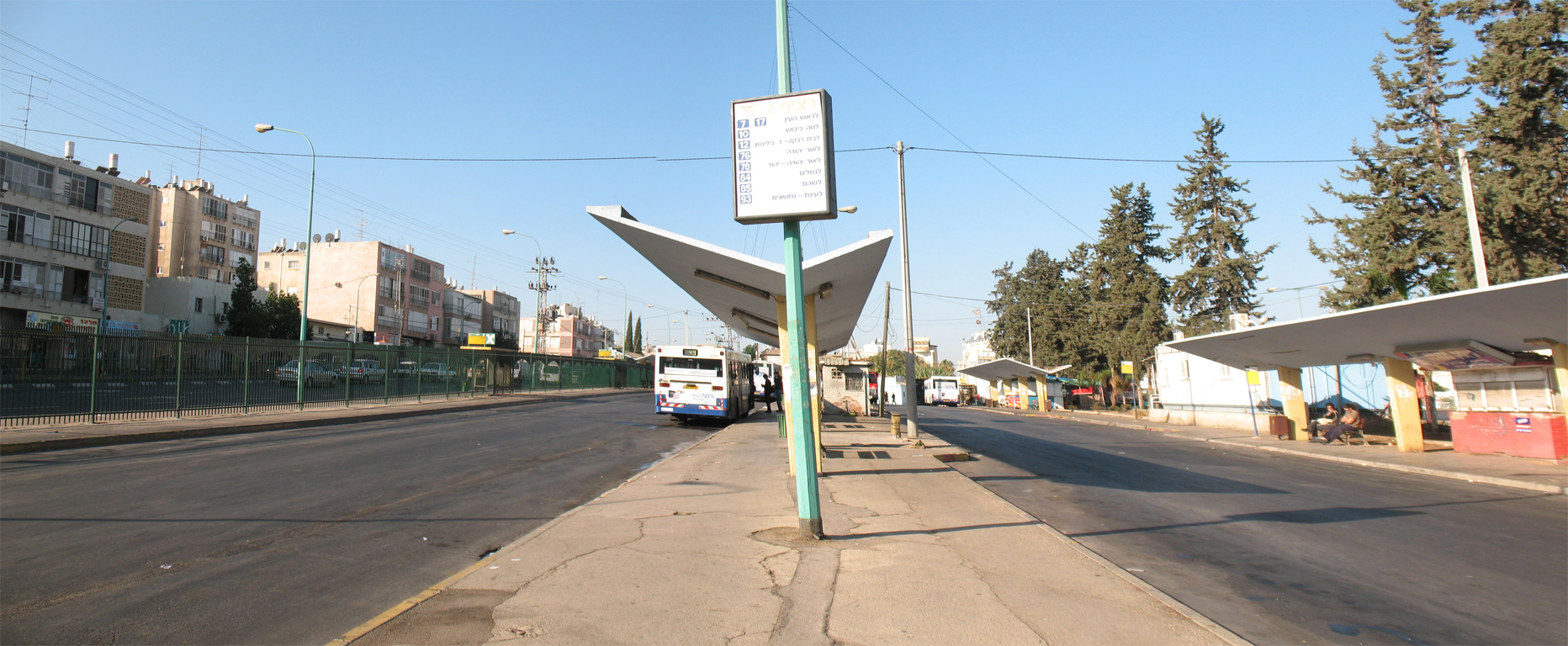
Petah Tikva central bus station

The Petah Tikva central bus station, abbreviated Petah Tikva CBS, is the main bus station in Petah Tikva, Israel. It serves Afikim, Dan, Egged, and Kavim buses. It is officially located on Zeev Orlov St. 64 on one side and Zeev Orlov St. 75 on the other. The station was built in 1957.

The Petah Tikva CBS has four platforms, each of which contains a multitude of small bus stations – two platforms are in an enclosed area to the side of Orlov St. and serve Dan and Kavim buses, while the other two platforms are on Orlov Street itself and serve Egged buses.

As of today, The Petah Tikva CBS is under renovation. Most of the route moved to a temporary terminal called "Moshe Arens Terminal". Only the bus routes of Dan and route 385 of Kavim remained in the Petah Tikva CBS.

The following buses stop at the Petah Tikva CBS or at Moshe Arens Terminal. Many of their routes, especially Egged's, do not originate in the station but come from Tel Aviv.

Notes:

- Most routes go both ways, but not all.
- Some routes are tagged with alternate route – routes which are normally different, and don't stop at the Petah Tikva CBS, but do on certain occasions.

==== Egged ====
Line	Route
159	Petah Tikva CBS – Camp Tzrifin (mornings only)
164	Petah Tikva CBS – Rehovot CBS (via Rishon LeZion)
249	Petah Tikva CBS – Rehovot CBS (via Lod, Ramla)
921	Tel Aviv CBS – Haifa Hof HaCarmel CBS

==== Afikim ====
Line	Route
7/7א	Rosh HaAyin Cemetery Terminal – Petah Tikva HaHarash Terminal
10/10א	Petah Tikv CBS – Yoseftal neighborhood
17	Petah Tikva CBS – Rosh HaAyin Cemetery Terminal
21	Petah Tikva CBS – Petah Tikva CBS via Kfar Maas
23	Sgula Industrial Area – Petah Tikva Beit Rivka
25	Petah Tikva CBS – Petah Tikva Beit Rivka
27	Rosh HaAyin Cemetery Terminal – Petah Tikva HaHarash Terminal
31	Petah Tikva CBS – Petah Tikva CBS
41	Petah Tikva CBS – Kiryat Matalon neighborhood
47	Giv'at Shmuel – Petah Tikva CBS
49/49א	Petah Tikva CBS – Tel Aviv University
53/53א	Petah Tikva CBS – Hadar HaMoshavot neighborhood
62	Schneider Terminal – Sgula Industrial Area
67	Petah Tikva CBS – Petah Tikva Sgula Train Station
81	Ra'anana – Kedumim Giv'at Shalem neighborhood (alternate route)
83	Petah Tikva CBS – Sdei Hemed
84	Petah Tikva CBS – Mazor
87	Petah Tikva CBS – Tel HaShomer
88	Petah Tikva CBS – Yarhiv
89/89א	Petah Tikva CBS – Nahshonim
91	Petah Tikva CBS – Kfar Sirkin
97	Hadar Ganim neighbirhood - Petah Tikva CBS
99/99א	Amisav – Petah Tikva CBS

==== Dan ====
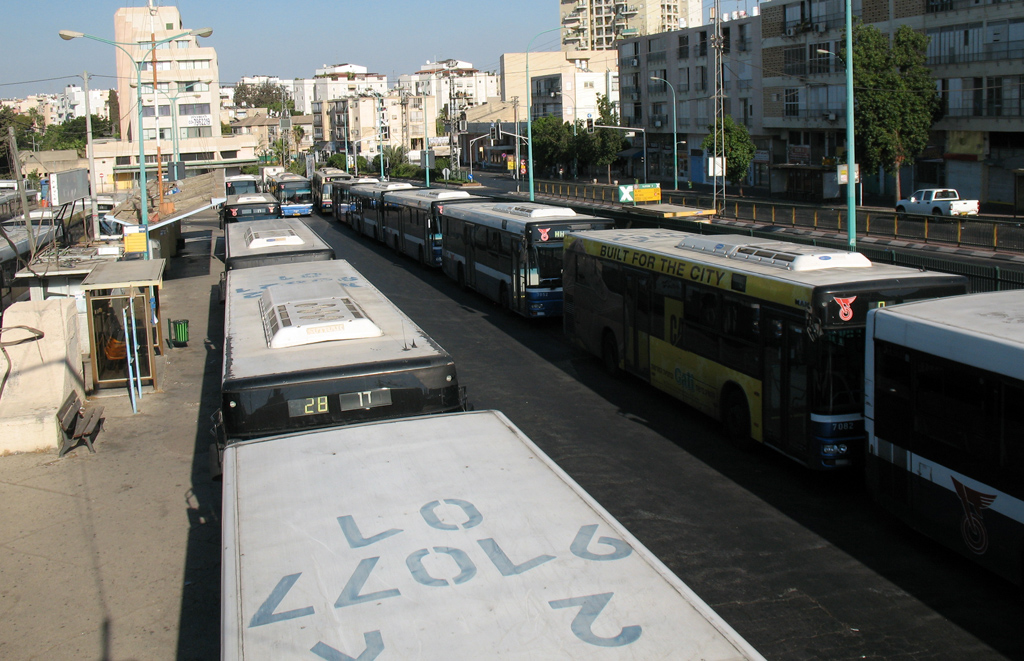
Southern section of the Petah Tikva Central Bus Station - Orlov Street (Egged platforms) are on the right, while Dan and Kavim platforms are in the center.

Line	Route
1	Petah Tikva CBS – Bat Yam Sports Center
38	Petah Tikva CBS – Holon Peres Park
51	Petah Tikva CBS – Tel Aviv CBS
66	Petah Tikva CBS – Tel Aviv Carmelit Terminal
92	Petah Tikva CBS – Ramat Gan Ayalon Mall
138	Petah Tikva CBS – Tel Aviv Arlozorov Terminal

==== Kavim ====
Line	Route
76	Petah Tikva CBS – Or Yehuda
78	Petah Tikva CBS – Or Yehuda
385	Petah Tikva CBS – Shoham
641	Petah Tikva HaHarash Terminal – Netanya CBS

==== Metropoline ====
Line	Route
551	Petah Tikva Kiryat Aryeh tailway station – Herzliya railway station
553	Petah Tikva CBS – Herzliya Marina
561	Petah Tikva Kiryat Aryeh tailway station – Kfar Saba CBS

==== Tnufa ====
Line	Route
184	Petah Tikva CBS – Oranit
185	Petah Tikva CBS – Etz Efraim
186	Ariel – Tel Aviv CBS
189	Immanuel – Bnei Brak
386	Petah Tikva CBS – Ariel University Center of Samaria (alternate route)
