= Herzliya Light =

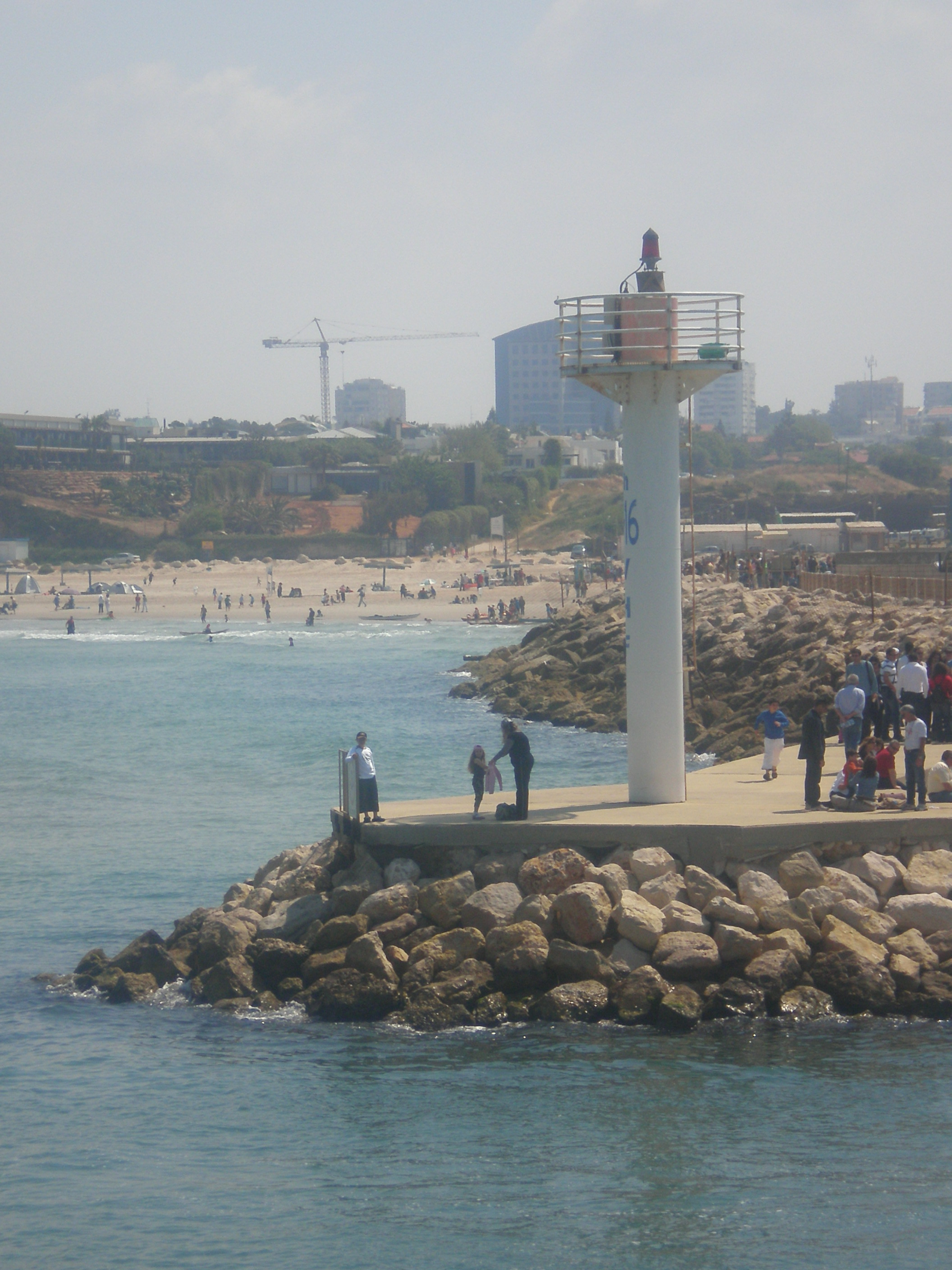
- Herzliya Light in 2007
- Location: Herzliya, Israel
- Coordinates: 32°9′56.9″N 34°47′33.35″E

Tower
- Constructed: 1990s
- Construction: concrete post tower
- Height: 11 metres (36 ft)
- Shape: cylindrical tower with gallery
- Markings: white tower

Light
- Focal height: 15 metres (49 ft)
- Range: 12 nautical miles (22 km; 14 mi)
- Characteristic: green flash every 5s

Herzliya Light (Hebrew: מגדלור הרצליה), also known as Herzliya Marina Light, is a lighthouse in Herzliya, Israel. It is located at the end of the main breakwater of the Herzliya marina. The lighthouse is accessible by walking the pier, but the tower is closed to the public.

== See also ==
- List of lighthouses in Israel
- Herzliya Marina
