= Ilana Goor Museum =

Museum in Jaffa, Israel

- מוזיאון אילנה גור
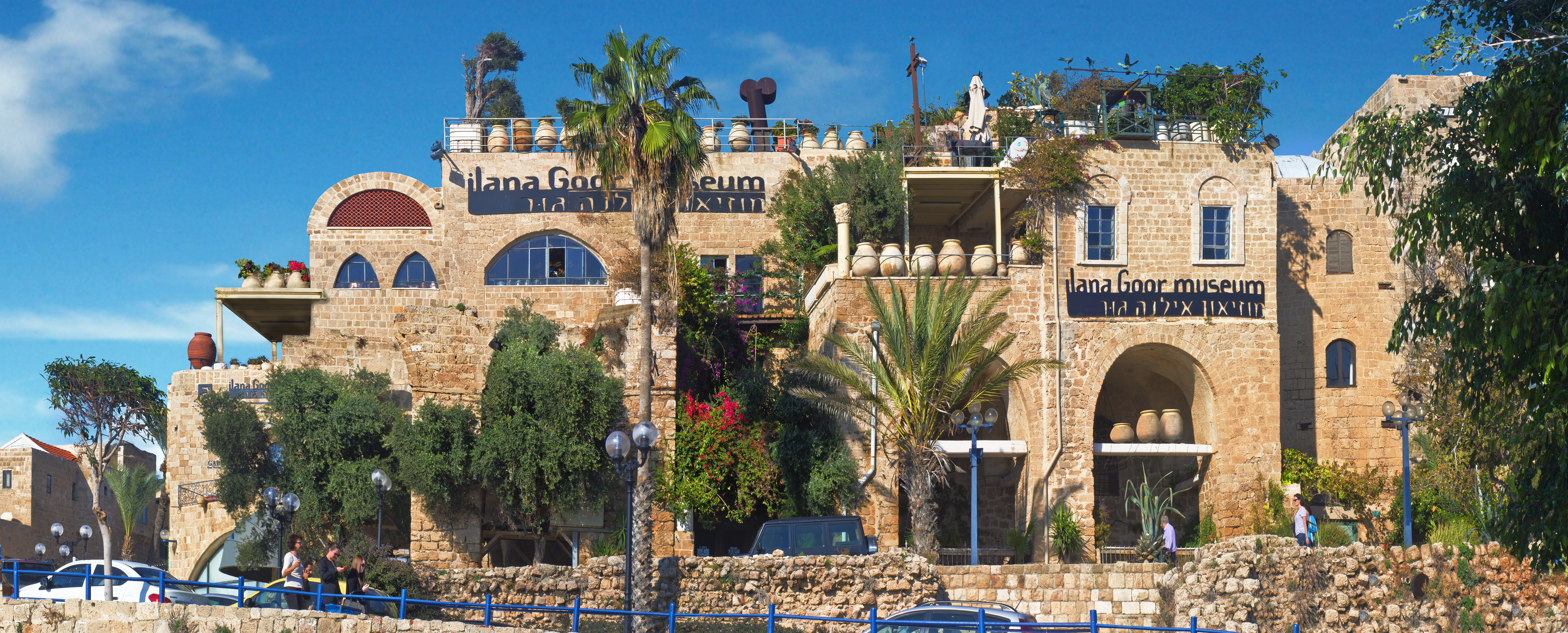
- Established: 1995
- Location: Mazal Dagim Street 4 Tel Aviv
- Coordinates: 32.0533°N 34.7513°E
- Founder: Ilana Goor
- Website: www.ilanagoormuseum.org

The Ilana Goor Museum, or the Ilana Goor Residence and Museum (Hebrew: מוזיאון אילנה גור), is an Israeli museum situated in the historical part of Jaffa, the Mediterranean port town south of Tel Aviv. The museum was founded in 1995 by Ilana Goor, an artist, designer and sculptor. Its eclectic collection has been called an "artistic jungle", but Goor considers it to have been her own "university".

== History ==
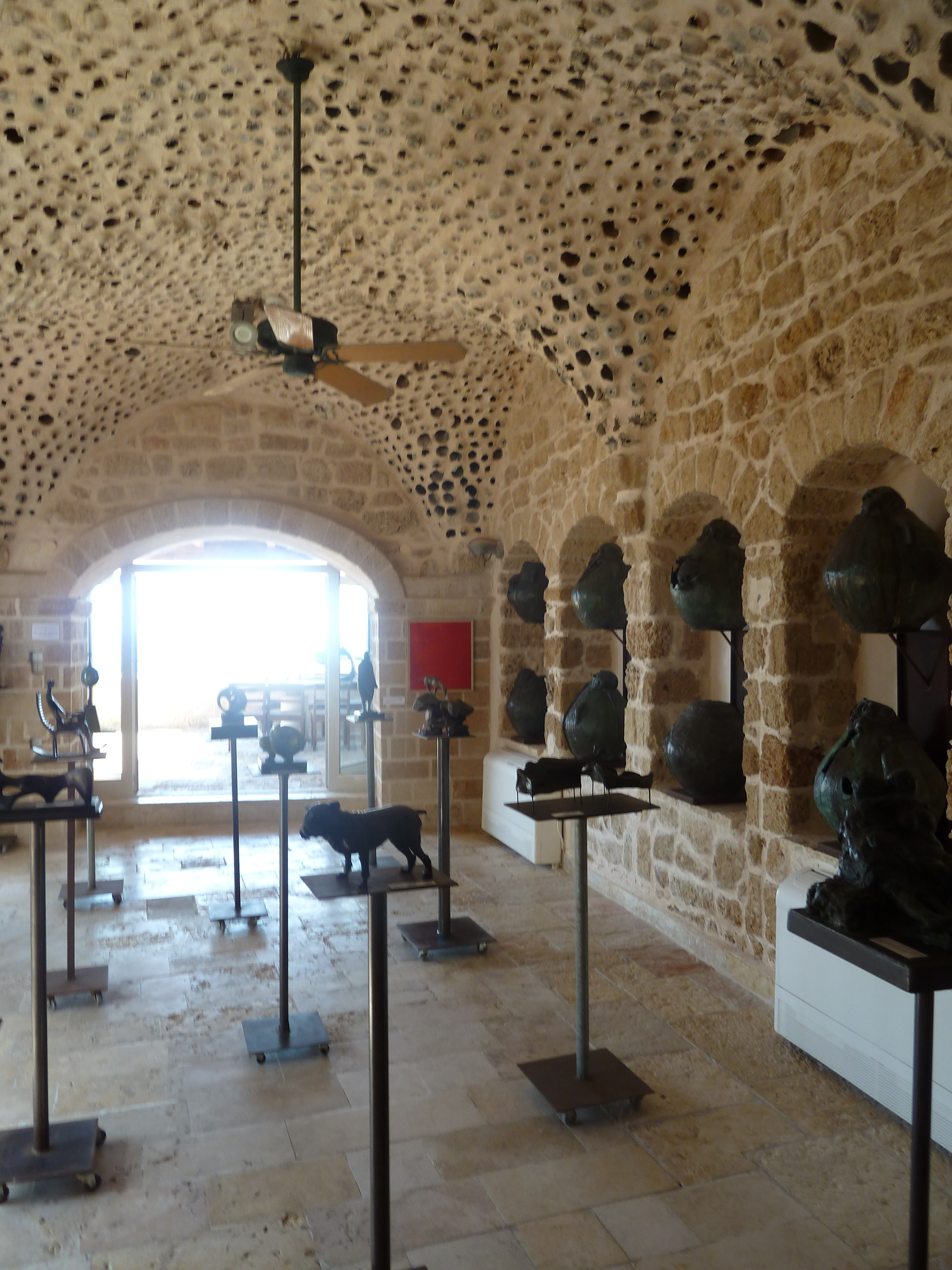
Sculpture room

The building now housing the Ilana Goor Museum was originally erected in 1742. At that time it was used as an inn for Jewish pilgrims travelling to Jerusalem. The inn, located outside the city walls, served as a shelter, protecting the pilgrims from robbers. In the second half of the 19th century it became a factory for olive oil soap. Yet another century later, in 1949 and thus by now within the newly created State of Israel, a community of Libyan Jews were using part of the building as a synagogue. Ilana Goor first purchased part of the building in 1983, and then eventually also the rest of it, with the intention of converting it to a museum dedicated to her art collection. The museum was inaugurated in September 1995.

== Collections ==
The museum has a collection of more than 500 works of art, either created by Ilana Goor or collected by her over a period of 50 years, either in Israel or during her travels around the world. The collection includes paintings, some 300 sculptures, video art, ethnic art from Africa and Latin America, antiques, drawings, and design objects. The museum has works by contemporary artists like Diego Giacometti, Henry Moore, Josef Albers and Olga Wolniak.

== See also ==
- Visual arts in Israel
- List of Israeli museums
- Art in Tel Aviv
