= Herzliya Marina =

Marina in Herzliya, Israel

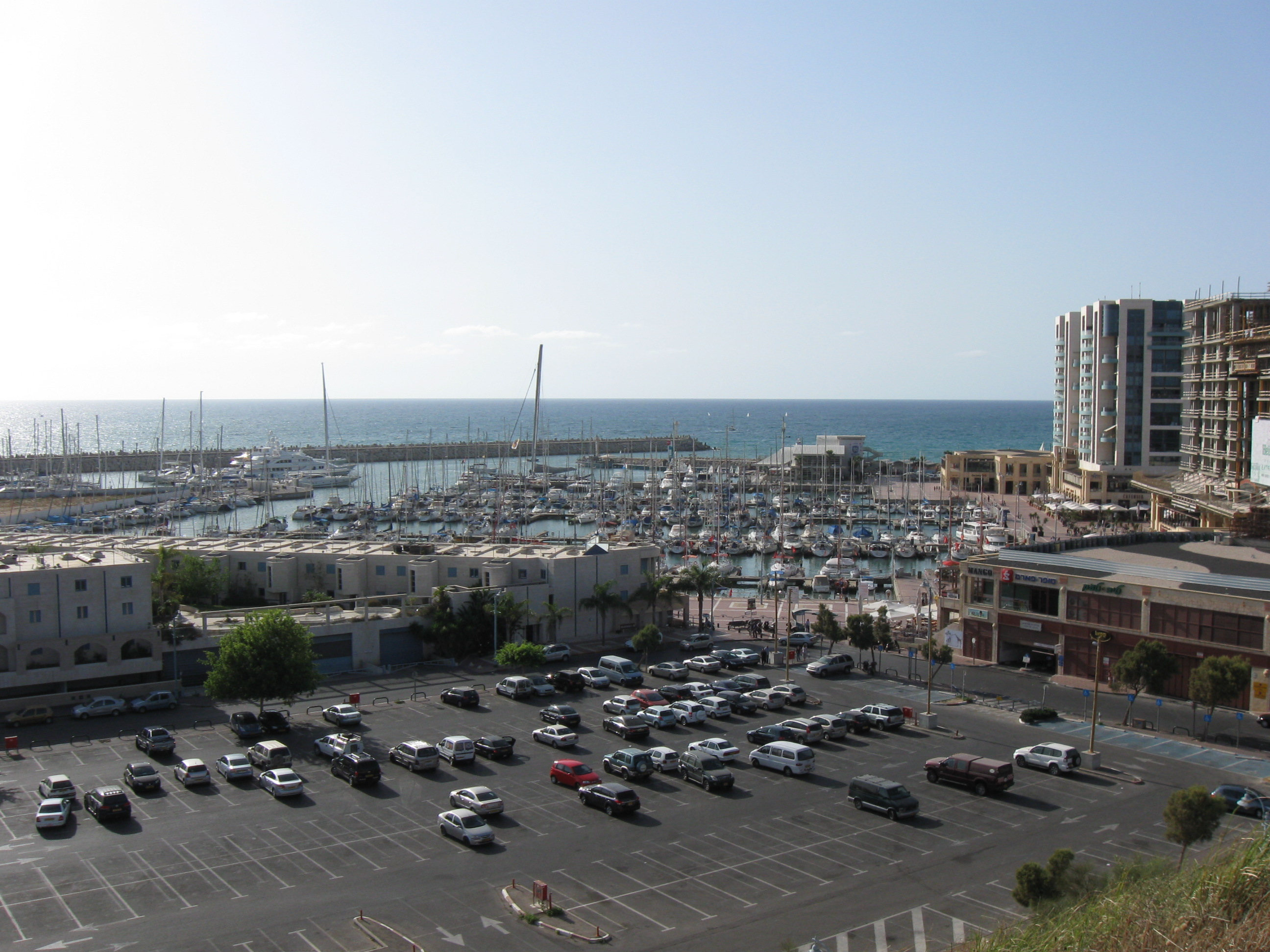
View of Herzliya Marina from Tel Michal to the east

Herzliya Marina is a marina located on the Mediterranean coast of Herzliya, Israel, south of the Dan Accadia Hotel and adjacent to the archaeological mound of Tel Michal.

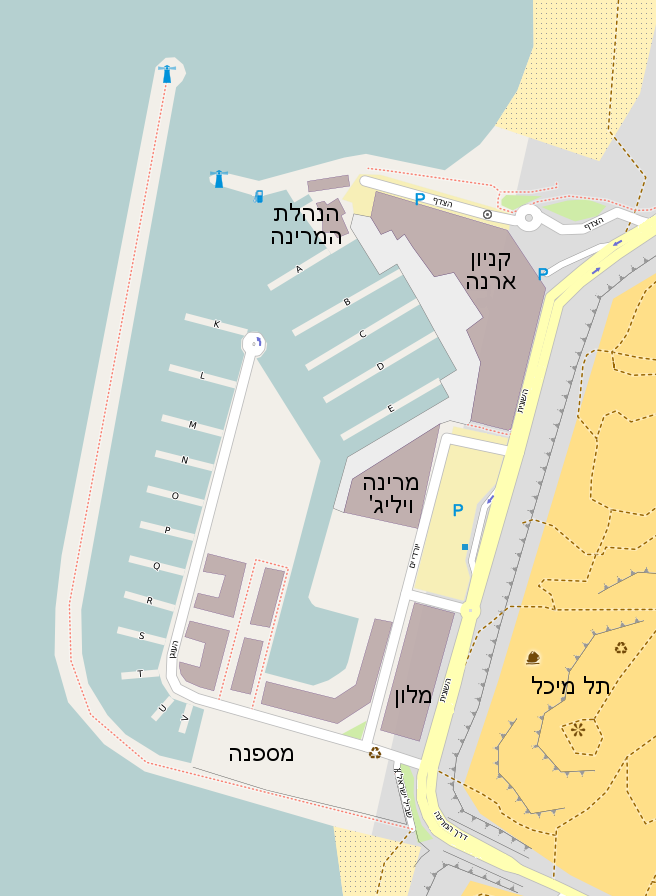
Map of the marina

== Structure and facilities ==
The marina covers an area of approximately 500 dunams. Half of this area includes the harbor, shipyard, administrative buildings (including the marina management, border police, and customs), maritime education facilities, a fuel station, and workshops. The other half consists of public open spaces, recreational and tourism areas, and commercial areas.

The harbor is divided into three sections and provides 680 berths for vessels up to 35 meters in length. The piers are equipped with electricity, water, and telephone connections. On average, around 580 vessels are moored in the marina. The marina's entrance faces north to prevent sand carried by southern currents from blocking it, and two lighthouses mark the entrance.

The shipyard occupies eight dunams on the southern side of the marina and began operating in January 2000. It offers repair and maintenance services for all types of vessels. Boats are lifted using a crane capable of lifting up to 50 tons or by a tractor pulling them up a ramp. Up to 75 vessels can be stored in the shipyard.

The marina is open to the public, including its main breakwater, over one kilometer long, which also functions as a promenade. The marina complex includes holiday apartments, restaurants, cafés, and the adjacent Arena Mall. Several companies operate maritime and recreational activities at the site. The project includes a hotel from the Ritz-Carlton chain with about 200 rooms and vacation apartments, opened in 2013.

In March 2015, the Herods Herzliya Hotel was opened at the tip of the marina's artificial peninsula.

== History ==
The marina was initiated by the Israeli Ministry of Transport and the Herzliya Municipality in the early 1980s as part of a national plan to increase the number of berths for small boats, yachts, and private sailboats in Israel.

After Eli Landau was elected mayor in 1983, he became a strong advocate for the project. In August 1985 the National Planning Council approved a plan to develop the site as a tourism and recreation hub. The plan allowed private financing in exchange for building rights, and the land designation was changed to "Tourism and Recreation" allowing hotel construction but prohibiting residential units.

In February 1988, the Israel Lands Authority issued a tender requiring the developer to reclaim 133 dunams for hotels and tourist facilities, in exchange for financing a marina with 800 berths.

A partnership of Yeshers (20%), South African billionaire Nathan Kirsh (30%), and businessman Motti Zisser (50%) won the tender, forming Marina Herzliya Ltd., chaired by Shuki Forer.

Construction began in 1990 after approval was given to increase the reclaimed area to 147 dunams.

Although the marina and breakwater were completed by 1992, planning disputes delayed building permits for several years. Meanwhile, Marina Herzliya Ltd. sold building rights to other developers, including the Ofer Brothers Group, Azorim, and Almog Yam Suf. These developers began planning and selling residential apartments despite the lack of approval for residences.

=== Controversies and legal proceedings ===
In 1996, journalist Arie Avneri published a series of investigative articles alleging corruption in the tender process and in the expansion of building rights. Police investigations followed, and several individuals were charged but later acquitted for lack of evidence.

In 1998, the Society for the Protection of Nature in Israel petitioned against residential construction, claiming it violated National Master Plan 13, which prohibits residences within 100 meters of the shoreline. In December 1999, the Tel Aviv District Court ruled that the apartments could not be used as permanent residences.

Following public opposition, Mayor Yael German froze construction permits and sought to revoke the developers' tender for not meeting its terms, among them the marina's reduced size (535 instead of 800 berths). Legal battles between the city and the developers continued until 2003, when the court ruled that Zisser was not personally liable.

In 2003, the Arena Mall opened; a new access road from Highway 2 was also inaugurated that year.

== Criticism ==
=== Residential use ===
In 2006, the Supreme Court upheld the District Court ruling and ordered that all apartments sold after December 1999 may only be used as holiday units rented out through a hotel operator.

In 2010, the Ministry of Tourism and Herzliya Municipality instructed owners to comply and rent their units for at least nine months annually.

=== Environmental impact ===
A study by Prof. Dov Tsivieli (Ruppin Academic Center) found that the marina disrupted natural sand flow from the south, causing severe erosion north of the marina, narrowing the beach and accelerating cliff collapse, as seen in Apollonia.

To address this, in 2020 the Herzliya planning committee approved a plan to construct seven new breakwaters along the city's beaches. Environmental groups oppose the plan, citing ecological harm and interference with surfing and sailing.

== Gallery ==
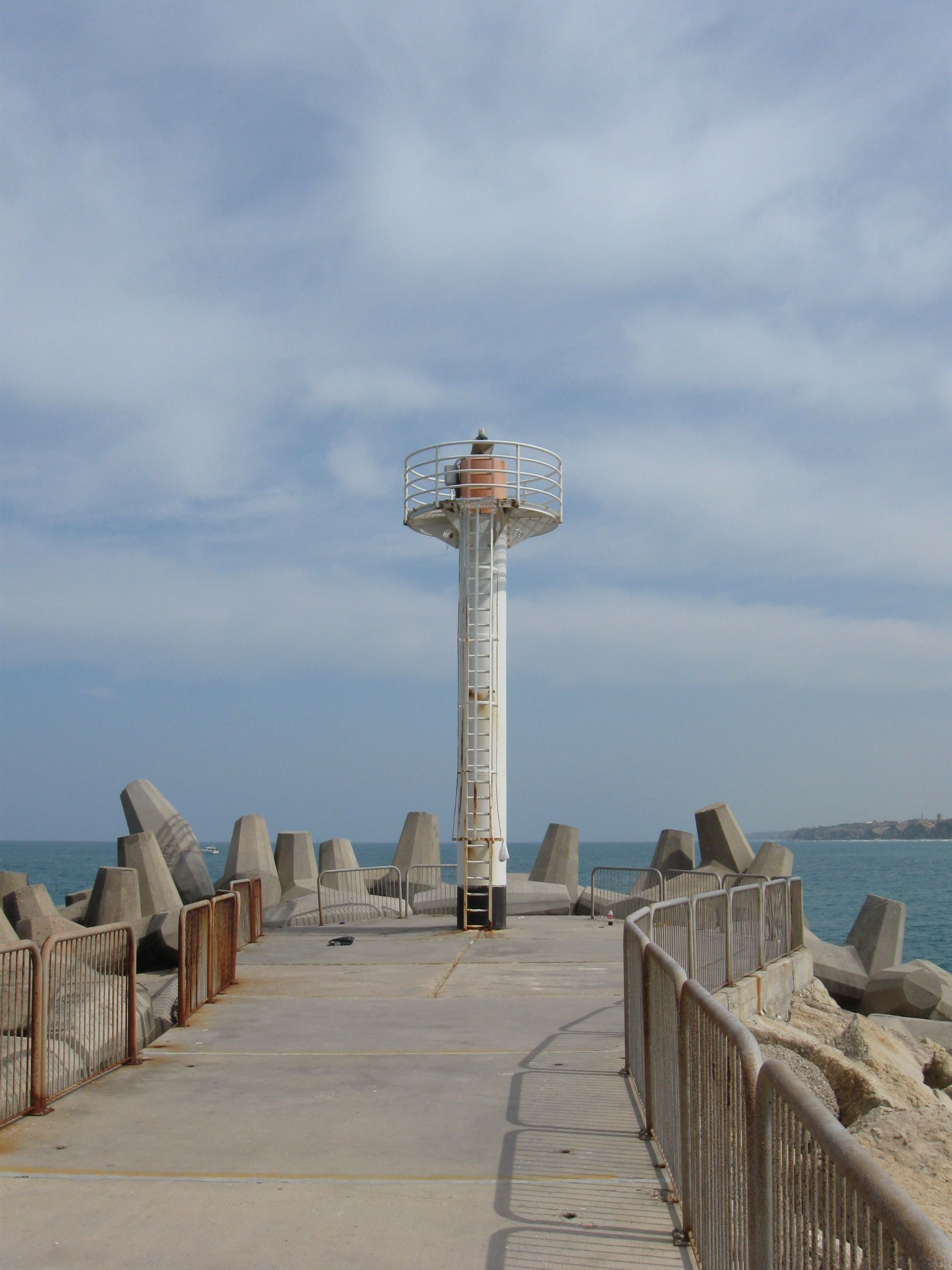
Main breakwater lighthouse

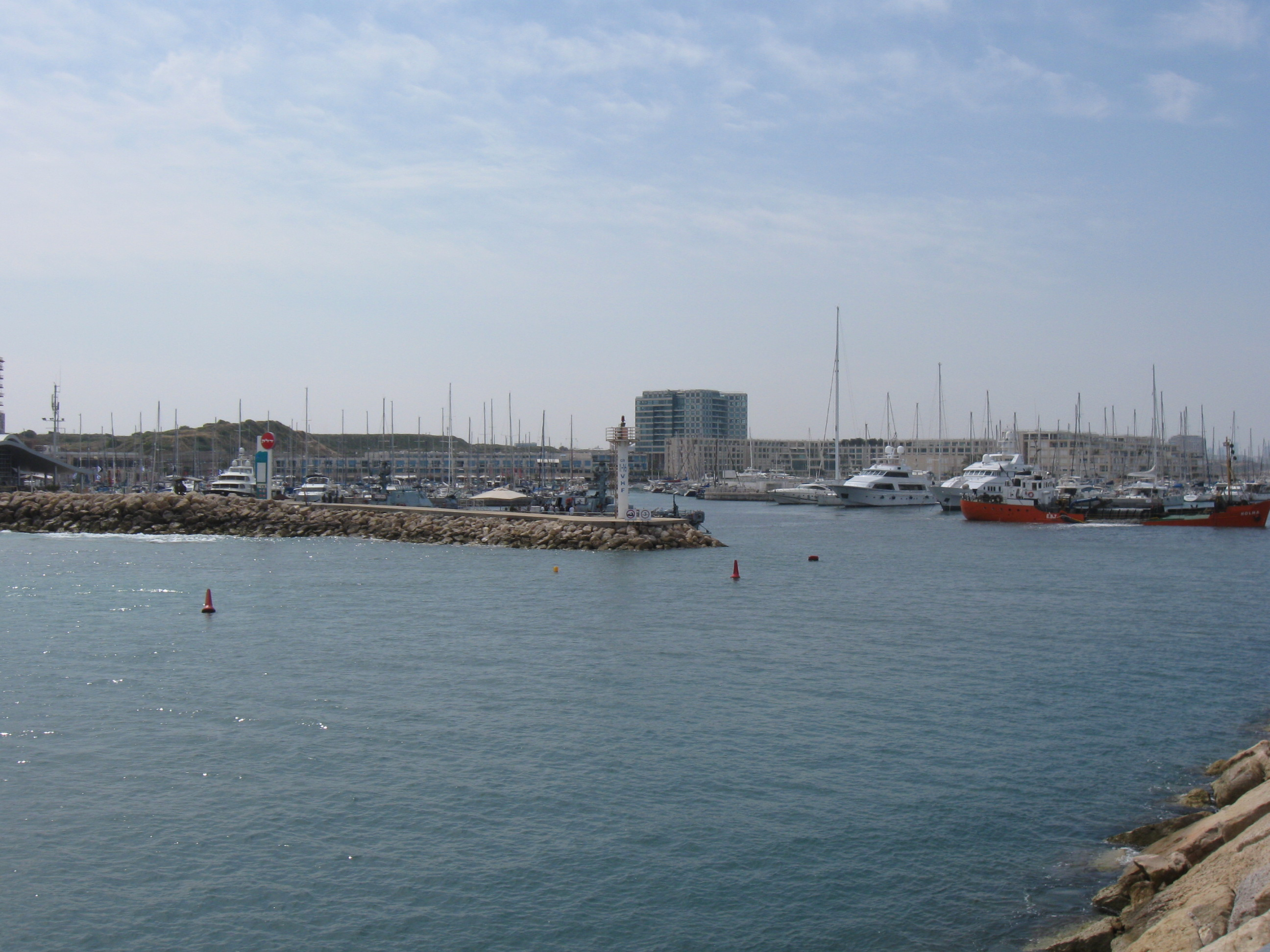
Entrance to the harbor

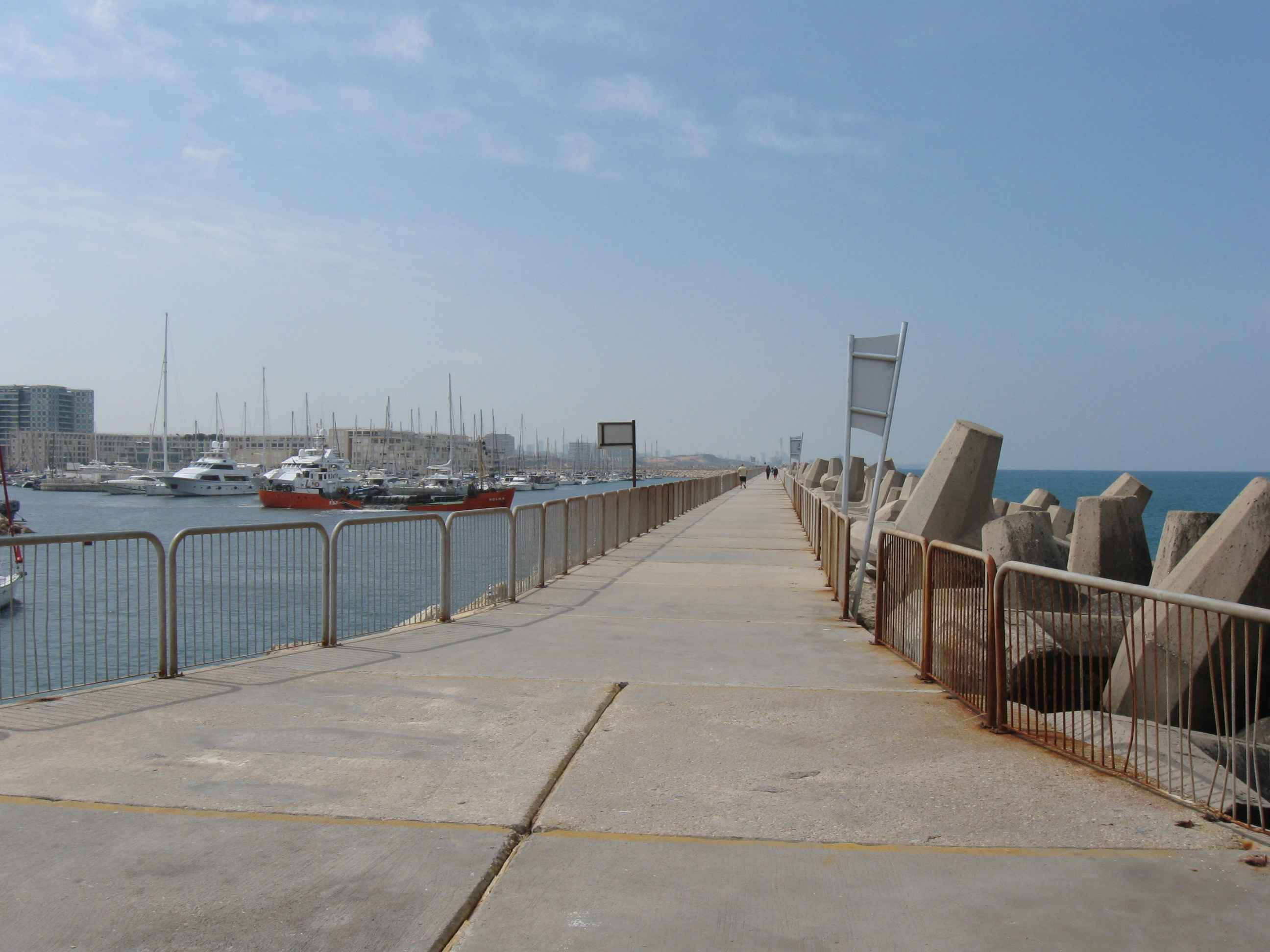
Main breakwater

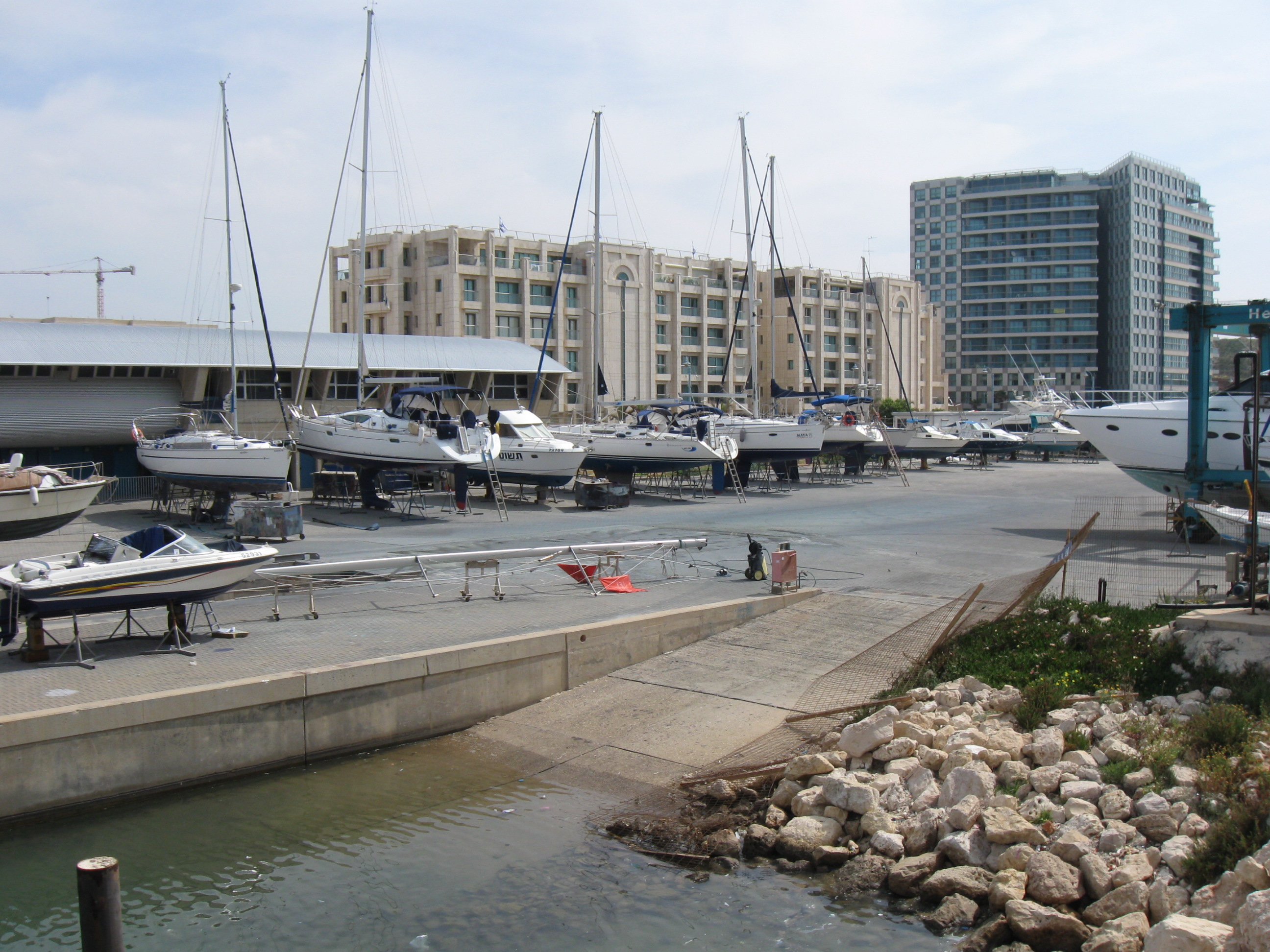
The shipyard

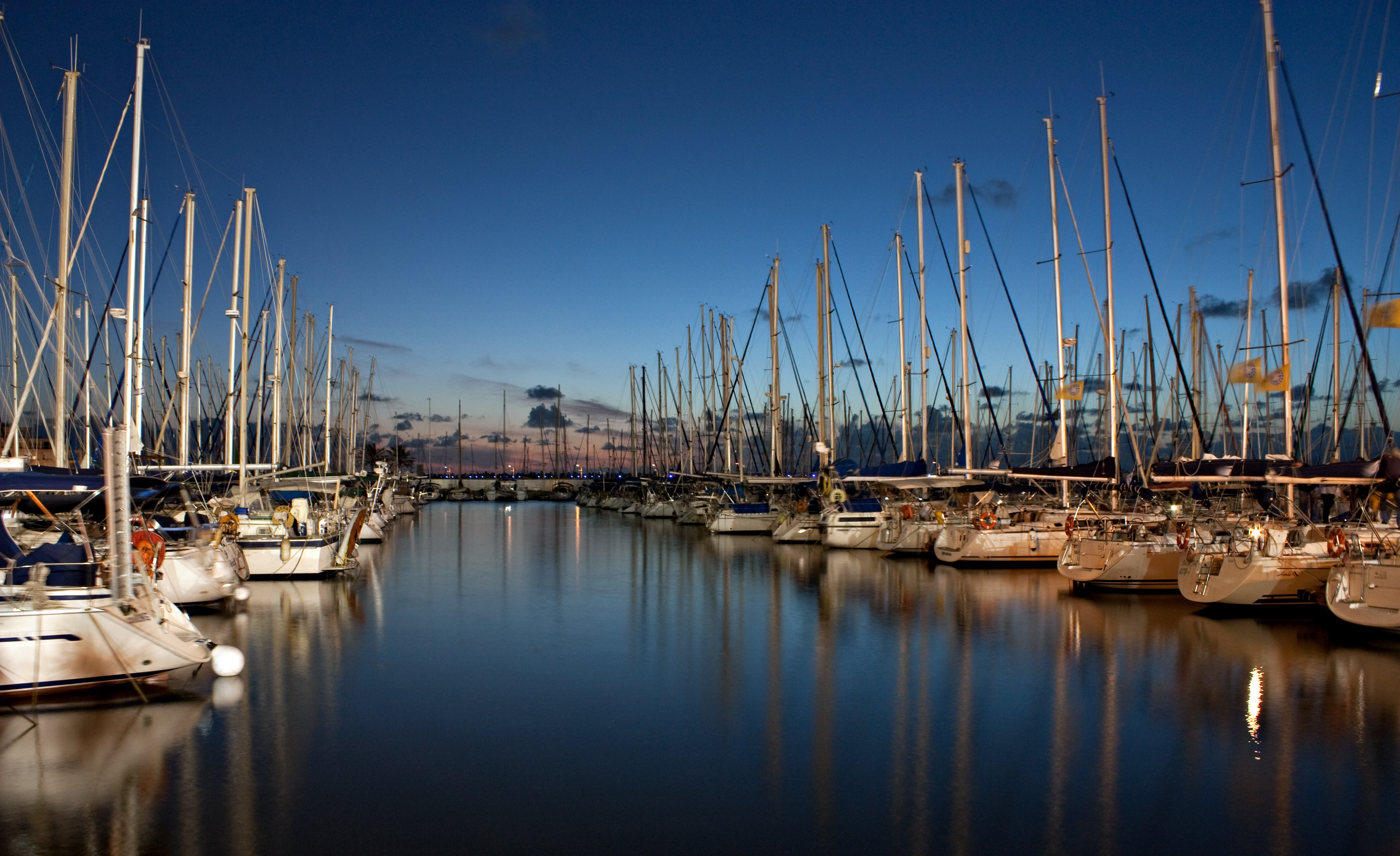
Boats at sunset

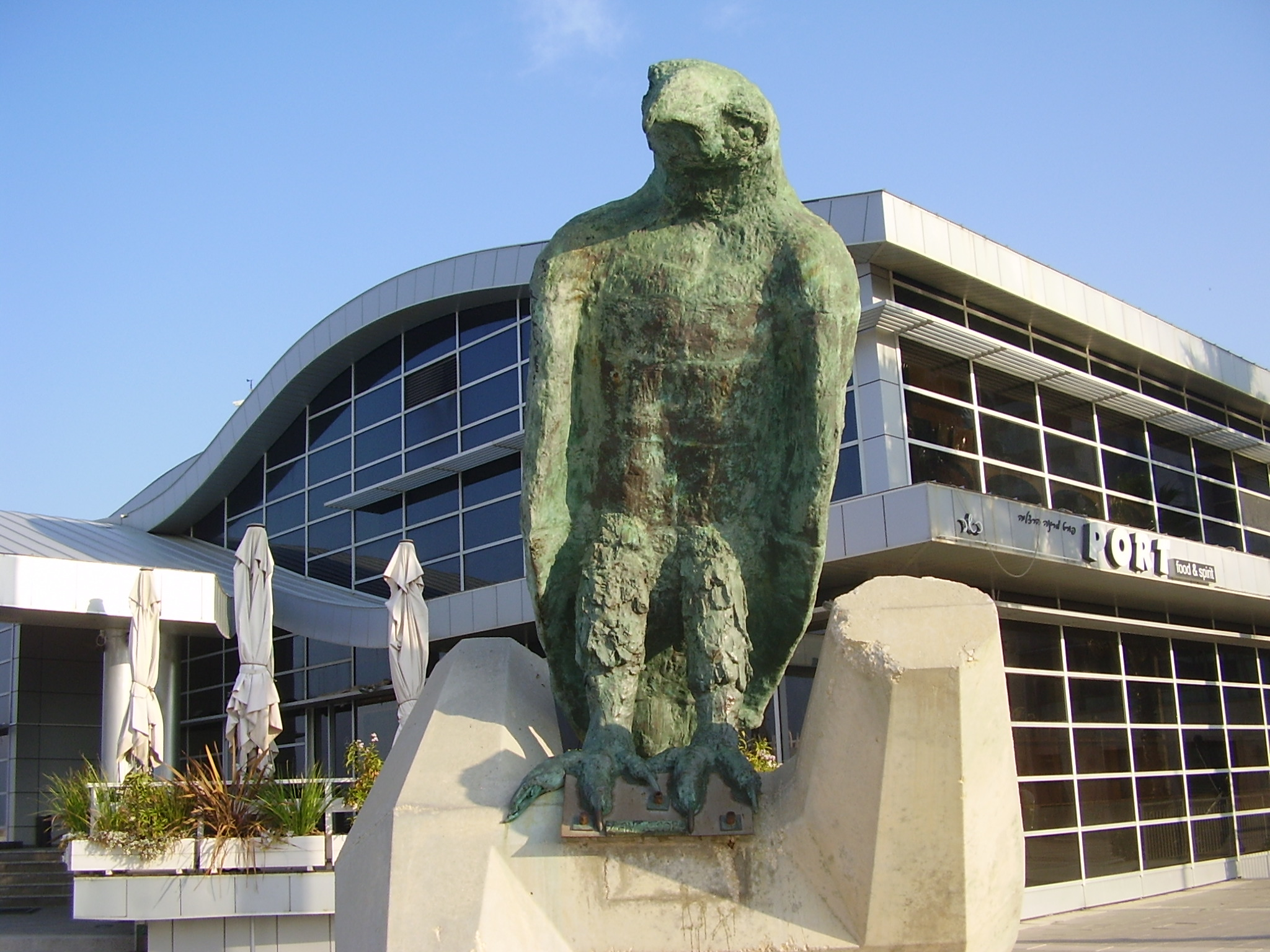
Marina administration building and Eagle sculpture by Ilana Goor

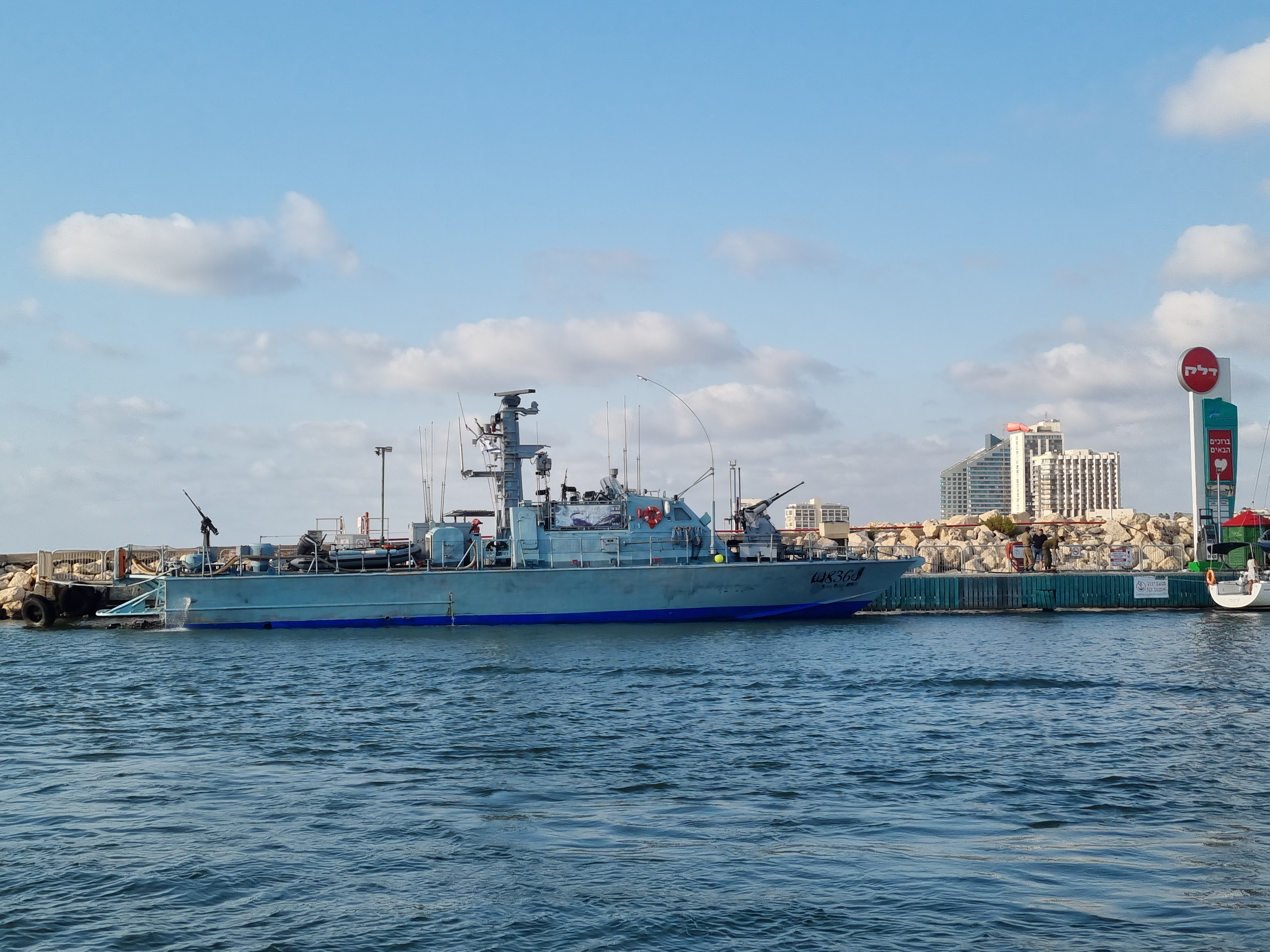
Super Dvora Mk III of the Israeli Navy docked at the marina
