= Ilana Goor =

Israeli artist (born 1936)

- אילנה גור
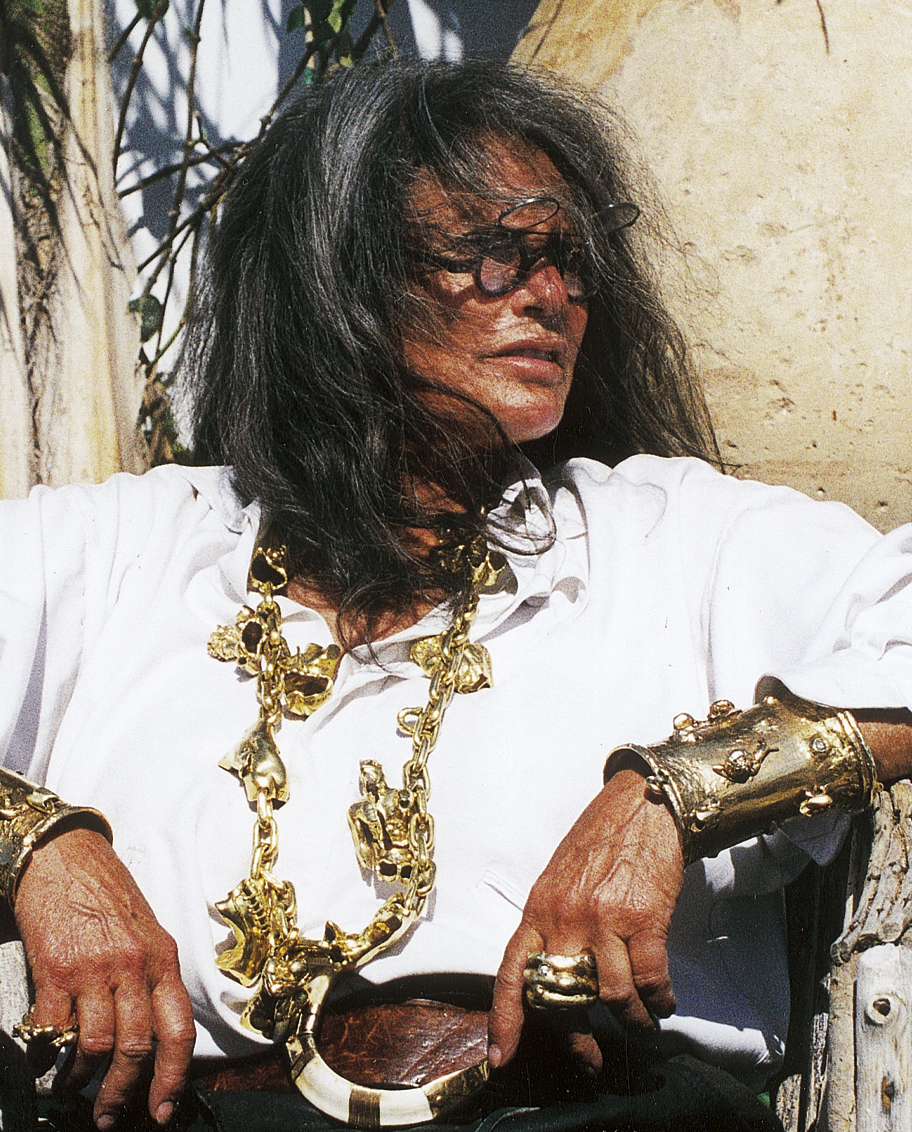
- Born: July 10, 1936 (age 90); Tiberias, Mandatory Palestine (now Israel)
- Known for: Sculpture, design
- Notable work: Never Again, Woman Against the Wind
- Website: Official website

Ilana Goor (Hebrew: אילנה גור; born 10 July 1936) is an Israeli sculptor, designer and multidisciplinary artist. She is known for expressive bronze and iron sculptures, functional art and jewellery, and as the founder of the Ilana Goor Museum in Old Jaffa, Israel.

== Early life ==
Goor was born in Tiberias, then part of Mandatory Palestine, into a prominent family of physicians, several of whom were also active in the arts. Her grandfather Yossef Sapir was among the founders of the Bezalel School of Art in Jerusalem. She did not complete formal art studies and is widely described as an autodidact who developed her own style and techniques outside academic institutions.

In the late 1960s Goor began to work seriously in sculpture while living in Los Angeles. Her first major solo exhibition was held in 1972 at the California Museum of Science and Industry in Los Angeles. This early work already combined sculptural forms with elements of design and everyday objects.

== Career ==
Goor works across sculpture, furniture, lighting, household objects, jewellery and fashion accessories, often combining bronze and iron with wood, leather, glass and found materials. She first gained wider recognition in the United States with leather belts featuring large sculptural buckles, followed by limited-edition collections of iron and bronze furniture and accessories for the American and Japanese markets.

Since the 1970s, her sculptures and design pieces have been shown in museums and galleries in Israel, Europe and North America. Institutions that have exhibited her work include the Tel Aviv Museum of Art, the Museum of Modern Art in Helsinki, the Bavarian State Museum of Art in Munich, the Museum of the Twentieth Century in Vienna and other venues.

Goor has created a number of outdoor sculptures installed throughout Israel. Notable works include Never Again (1973), a bronze memorial at Yad Vashem in Jerusalem; Woman Against the Wind on the Tel Aviv seafront near Charles Clore Park; and Smiling Whale, a fountain sculpture in Old Jaffa.

Her aesthetic has been described as eclectic and expressive, bringing together industrial materials and organic forms, and juxtaposing antiques, ethnographic objects and contemporary art. Writers have likened the dense display of artworks in her homes and museum to an "artistic jungle".

== Ilana Goor Museum ==
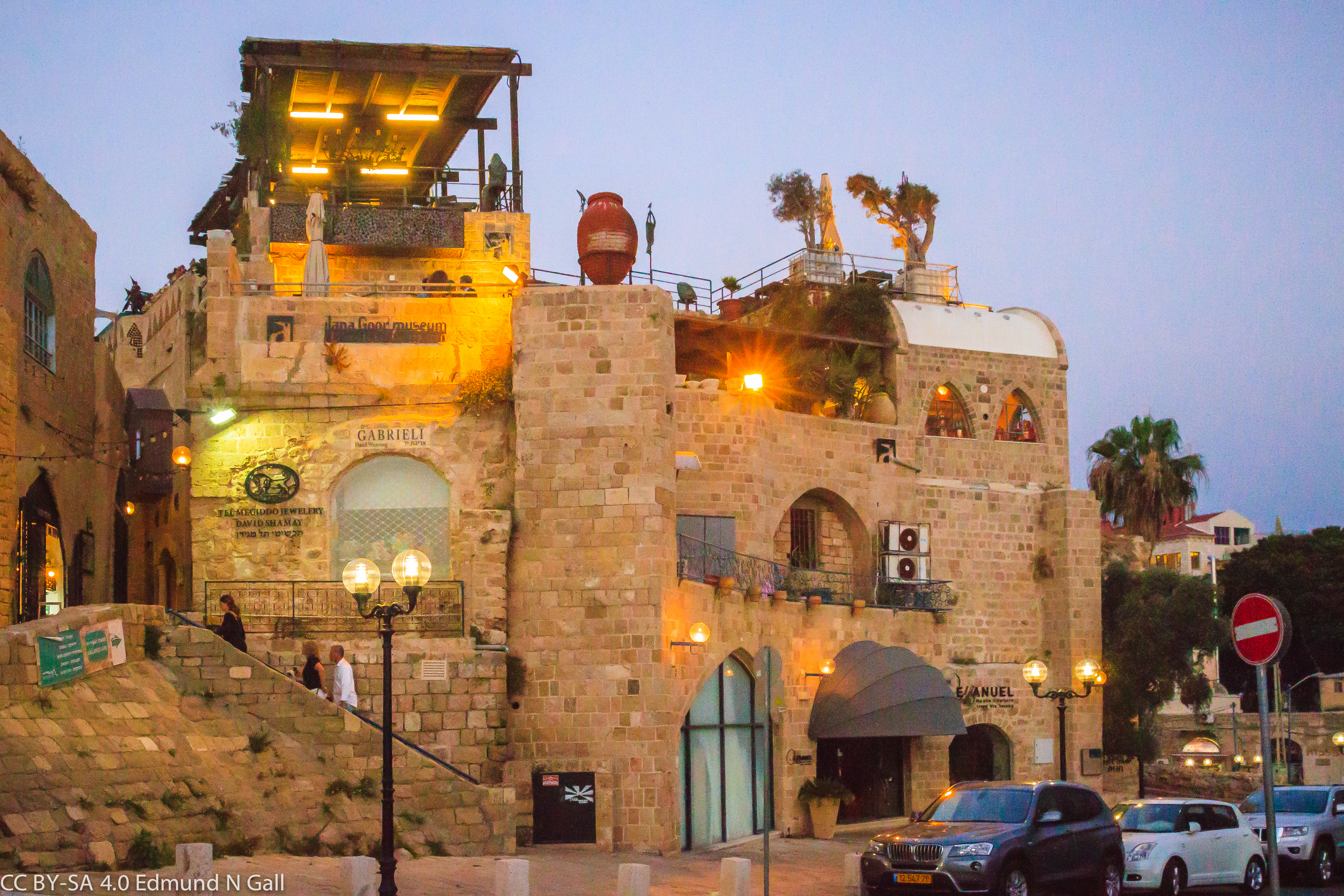
Ilana Goor Museum

In 1995 Goor opened her home in Old Jaffa to the public as the Ilana Goor Museum, which functions both as a private residence and as a museum of her work and art collection. The museum is housed in an 18th-century stone building that originally served as an inn for Jewish pilgrims on their way to Jerusalem and later as a soap factory and synagogue.

The collection includes more than 500 works: sculptures, paintings, jewellery, design objects and ethnographic artefacts from Israel and around the world, displayed across several floors and a rooftop sculpture garden overlooking the Mediterranean Sea.

== Awards and recognition ==
Goor received the Roscoe Award for the best design in residential seating for her iron furniture collection in the 1980s. In 2016 she was named a Yakir Tel Aviv–Yafo (Honorary Citizen of Tel Aviv–Jaffa) for her contribution to the city’s cultural life.

In 2025 the documentary film Ilana Goor – A Woman Against the Wind, directed by Tomer Heymann, was released, focusing on her life, work and the future of her self-made museum.

== Personal life ==
Goor divides her time between Jaffa and New York City, where she and her husband have maintained a converted townhouse that also functions as an exhibition space for her work and art collection.

== See also ==
- Ilana Goor Museum
